= Israel Cohen =

Israel Cohen may refer to:

- Israel Cohen (footballer), Israeli footballer
- A Racial Program for the Twentieth Century, a hoax document supposedly written by an "Israel Cohen" in 1912
- Israel Cohen (Zionist) (1879–1961), English Zionist journalist and general secretary of the World Zionist Organization 1922–1939
