= Patrick Bascio =

Patrick Bascio (1927 - May 30, 2010) was an author and Catholic priest. He was a professor at Salve Regina University in Rhode Island.

Bascio was born in Boston, Massachusetts to Pasquale and Antoinette Bascio. During World War II he served as a pilot in the United States Air Force. In 1955 he was ordained a priest by the Holy Ghost fathers. He earned an M.A. and a Ph.D. from Fordham University.

Over the ensuing years he served as a missionary in Tanzania, Trinidad and Tobago and Grenada. He was later a representative of Grenada to the United Nations. In the 1980s Bascio was the director of the Ph.D. program in the humanities at the United States Naval War College in Rhodes Island.

For many years Bascio was the priest of a majority African-American parish in Harlem. While in this position he came to see unfettered immigration as a negative thing. In 2009 he published an anti-immigration work On the Immorality of Illegal Immigration: A Priest Poses an Alternative Christian View. He wrote a total of nine books including a novel.

== Bibliography ==
- Building a Just Society: A Different Viewpoint, Orbis Books, 1981.
- Gorbachev and the Collapse of the Soviet Communist Party 1994
- Failure of White Theology: A Black Theological Perspective, Lang, 1994.
- A Crime of Innocence 2005, a novel
- Defeating Islamic Terrorism — The Wahhabi Factor, Branden Books, 2006
- The Immorality of Illegal Immigration: An Alternative Christian View, American Free Press, 2009
- Pedophilia Cancer Within, Branden Books, 2010
