= The Enemy of My Enemy (Michael book) =

2006 book by George Michael

- First edition cover
- Author: George Michael
- Language: English
- Subject: Extremism
- Publisher: University Press of Kansas
- Publication date: April 2006
- Publication place: United States
- Media type: Print (hardcover)
- Pages: 397
- ISBN: 0-7006-1444-3
- OCLC: 62593627
- Dewey Decimal: 363.3250973
- LC Class: HV6432 .M52 2006
- Preceded by: Confronting Right-Wing Extremism and Terrorism in the USA
- Followed by: Willis Carto and the American Far Right

The Enemy of My Enemy: The Alarming Convergence of Militant Islam and the Extreme Right is a 2006 book by political science professor George Michael of the University of Virginia Wise. It examines the alliances between neo-Nazis, Holocaust deniers, and white separatists with Islamists such as Al Qaeda, Hezbollah, Hamas, and Egyptian Islamic Jihad.

== Background and publication history ==
The author, George Michael is an American political scientist. At the time of the book's publication he was an assistant professor at the University of Virginia's College at Wise. In researching the book, he drew upon both a wide variety of secondary sources and numerous interviews with far-right activists. It was published in April 2006 by University Press of Kansas as a 397-page hardcover.

== Synopsis ==
Michael examines the alliances and positions of various far-right and Islamist groups, including neo-Nazis, Holocaust deniers, and white separatists, as well as with Islamist organizations like as Al Qaeda, Hezbollah, Hamas, and Egyptian Islamic Jihad. He examines their opinions on American foreign policy, the media, modernity, and the so-called New World Order.

He argues that both camps share a "fervent anti-Semitism, accompanied by strong pro-Palestinian views, anger over Israel's influence on American policymakers, and opposition to the Iraq War and the U.S. presence in the Middle East." While noting that this is not the case for all of the far-right, he argues that following the collapse of the Soviet Union, as well as a rise in the non-white population of the United States, the American extreme right became less patriotic and increasingly nihilistic, more focused on Jews and the "Zionist Occupation Government" (their term for the United States). He argues the connections between these movements may be a more significant concern in the future.

== Reception ==
Martin Durham praised the book, calling it an "excellent resource for understanding Islamism, the extreme right, and the real if still unlikely possibility of alliance between the two". Eric V. Larson, writing for the Political Science Quarterly reviewed the book, writing that it "provides a good overview of the historical and intellectual wellsprings of these two movements, but ultimately does not provide a case that would justify alarm." Saul Lerner called it "very important" and a "well-organized and focused, thoughtful, important book" that he "highly recommended."

Daveed Gartenstein-Ross of The Weekly Standard and Foundation for Defense of Democracies found it too long, yet lacking in analysis. But he noted its "in-depth study of the on-again, off-again love affair between radical Islam and the extreme right." Michael Freeman, writing for Perspectives on Political Science, called the book somewhat alarmist in its presentation, but with nuanced and systemic analysis of the subject and its potential dangers versus its current status. He noted the subject matter as "unique".

In 2025, scholar Samantha Olson writing in Studies in Conflict & Terrorism noted the book as a "prescient analysis" of the subject. Clive Henry noted it as one of the few scholarly works up to that point to examine David Myatt, the likely founder of the Order of Nine Angles, who attempted to broker Islamist/neo-Nazi alliances.

== See also ==
- Horseshoe theory
- Red–green–brown alliance
