= Our Race Will Rule Undisputed Over The World =

1952 speech fabricated by Eustace Mullins

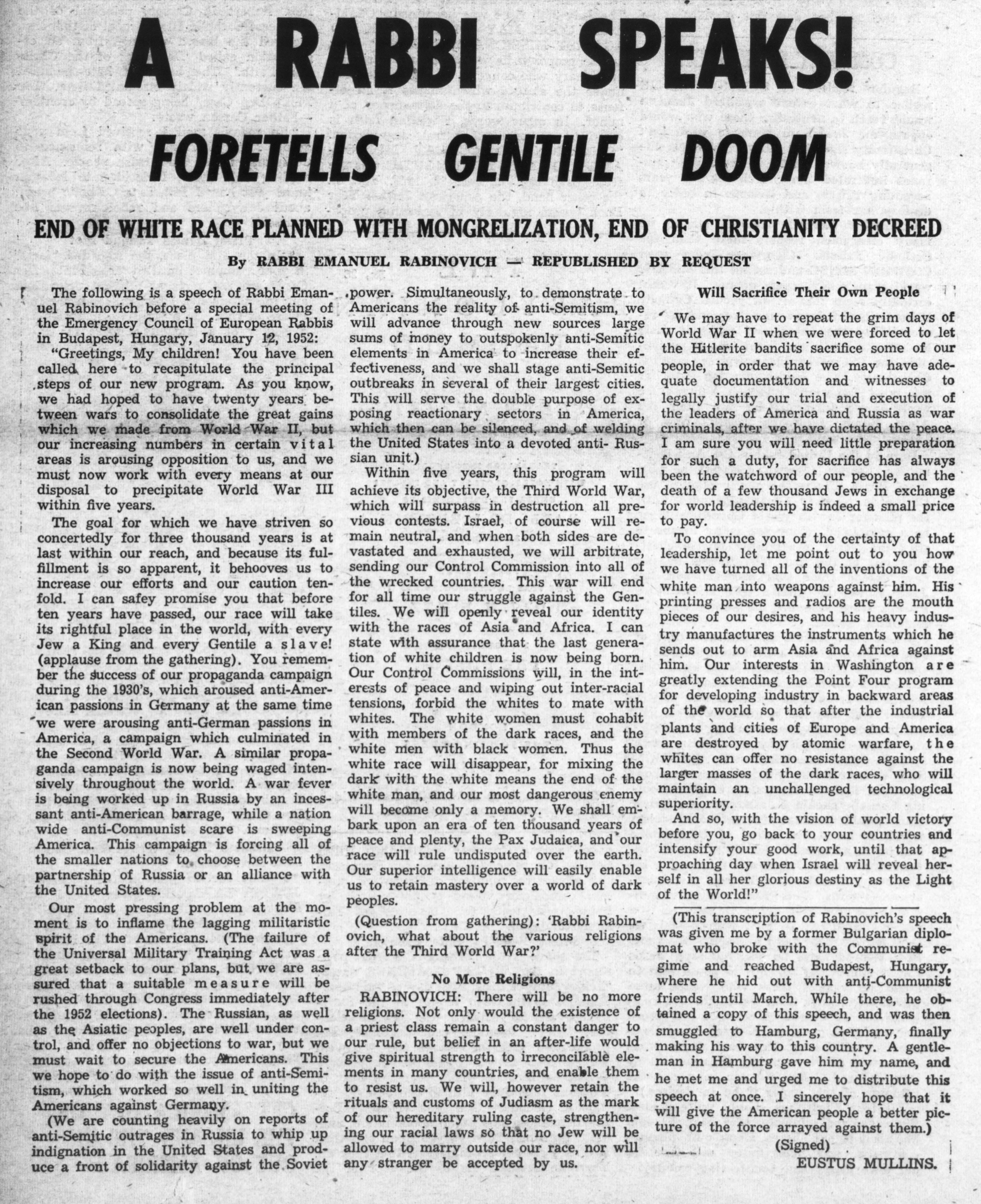
The speech as it appeared in a 1952 article by Eustace Mullins in Common Sense

Our Race Will Rule Undisputed Over The World is a fabricated speech often cited in antisemitic propaganda, purportedly by a Rabbi Emanuel Rabinovich. Both the speech and Rabinovich were, like the "Israel Cohen" of A Racial Program for the Twentieth Century, creations of Eustace Mullins. The text was published by Mullins in several outlets in the United States, and then spread internationally by Einar Åberg, who had worked with Mullins producing material for James Madole's National Renaissance Party.

The speech had been described as a hoax for decades, and this fact was confirmed by researcher Ernie Lazar. Among Lazar's sources was a confidential 1968 internal FBI memo noting that it was "inconceivable that any rational person would consider seriously Mullins' demented allegations and outrageous distortions".

== Origins ==
The speech was allegedly delivered to the "Emergency Council of European Rabbis" in Budapest, Hungary on January 12, 1952, by Rabbi Emanuel Rabinovich. Both the supposed speech and the rabbi were a hoax.

The text outlines a plan for Jews to subjugate the world via a "Third World War". This is taken as evidence for a Jewish plot against gentiles in much the same way as The Protocols of the Elders of Zion, invoked in the speech, is used as evidence of Jewish global conspiracy.

Eustace Mullins claimed to have received a copy of the speech from a Bulgarian diplomat defecting from the Communist government. According to Mullins, the diplomat had been hiding in Budapest where he received a copy of the speech, and then escaped to Hamburg, Germany, where he was given Mullins's name. The diplomat then allegedly emigrated to the United States, where he eventually met Mullins and gave him the copy.

== Publication ==
The text was first published in the May 1952 issue of Women's Voice under the title "Abominable, Yet True". At the same time, it appeared in the May 15, 1952 issue of the antisemitic broadsheet Common Sense published by Conde McGinley, noted as reprinted from Women's Voice. It appeared again in Common Sense on 1 August 1952 under the title "A Rabbi Speaks! Fortells Gentile Doom, with "Eustus Mullins" listed as the author of the article. It later appears in the September 1952 issue of the Canadian Intelligence Service, published by the Ron Gostick and the antisemitic Canadian League of Rights. Later, it was cited in a 27-page pamphlet titled Plans of the Synagogue of Satan, published by the National Federation of Christian Laymen in 1954. It was again published in The Liberty Bell, January, 1978, under the title "Exposing the Conspiracy: A Rabbi Speaks".

In October, 1952, an unidentified person mailed to then Director of Central Intelligence, General Walter Bedell Smith, a copy of the text in tract form, published internationally by Einar Åberg. Mullins had sent the Rabinovich material to Åberg, which Åberg distributed internationally through the mails.

== Established as a hoax ==
It was eventually established that Mullins fabricated the entire story. In August, 1958, New York's Congressman Abraham J. Multer read into the Congressional Record comments on Mullins's 1957 hoax of Israel Cohen and A Racial Program for the Twentieth Century. In those remarks, Multer said of Mullins, "[He] has, apparently, a marked propensity for phony claims and counterfeit creations. Some of his counterfeits include a speech by a non-existent Hungarian rabbi", referencing Rabinovich and the speech as a known hoax.

Syndicated columnist Marquis Childs called it "a poison pen document" and said "for mature Americans, the transparent hoax in this sort of thing is obvious... [but] in a time of fear and frustration some people may be deceived by it". Robert Singerman identifies it as a forgery in his work, Antisemitic Propaganda: An Annotated Bibliography and Research Guide.

The assumption that both the speech and rabbi were fake was confirmed by researcher Ernie Lazar, who had extensive data on Mullins. In Lazar's database was a 1968 internal FBI memo to J. Edgar Hoover, not intended for public release, which described Mullins as a "depraved, warped degenerate", and that it would be "inconceivable that any rational person would consider seriously Mullins' demented allegations and outrageous distortions we have previously considered it unwise to dignify his work with any kind of response".
