= Coleus leemannii =

Conservation status
- Least Concern (SANBI Red List)

Scientific classification
- Kingdom: Plantae
- Clade: Tracheophytes
- Clade: Angiosperms
- Clade: Eudicots
- Clade: Asterids
- Order: Lamiales
- Family: Lamiaceae
- Genus: Coleus
- Species: C. leemannii

Binomial name
- Coleus leemannii (N.Hahn) A.J.Paton

Synonyms
- Rabdosiella leemannii N.Hahn

Species of shrub

Coleus leemannii, the Soutpansberg flybush, is a species of hullwort endemic to South Africa′s Limpopo province.

It is listed as Rare (Least Concern) in the Red List of South African Plants.

== Description ==
This species is a single- or multi-stemmed shrub, usually 1–1.5 m (3 ft 3 in – 4 ft 11 in) tall, occasionally reaching 2 m (6 ft 7 in). The main stem may be up to 50 mm (2.0 in) in diameter and shows distinct annual growth rings. Young stems are pale brown and softly hairy, becoming glabrous with age; the bark is grey to grey-brown.

The leaves are arranged oppositely, rarely in threes, and are borne on short stalks. The leaf blades are ovate to elliptic or trullate, 59–66 mm (2.3–2.6 in) long, with a pale green, sparsely hairy upper surface and a grey, densely felted underside. The margins are crenate to dentate.

The inflorescence is a terminal thyrse 50–100 mm (2.0–3.9 in) long, bearing flowers in stalked cymes. The calyx is tubular and five-toothed, green and glandular-hairy, enlarging in fruit. The corolla is white with purple-pink markings, with a boat-shaped lower lobe. The fruit consists of small, rounded brown nutlets.

== Distribution and habitat ==
Coleus leemannii is found among rocks in open bushveld in the mistbelt of the Soutpansberg and Blouberg mountains in Limpopo, above 1,400 m (4,600 ft) in altitude.

== Etymology ==
The species is named after the botanist Dr Albert Konrad Leemann (1892–1975), who first collected a specimen and published a photograph of it in the German botanical journal Vegetationsbilder.

Born in Johannesburg, Leemann (sometimes given as ″Leeman″) obtained his PhD in Geneva, Switzerland, before returning to South Africa to work, principally in agricultural weed control.

He later moved to Europe permanently, where his writing – books such as Die Wiedergeburt des Abendlandes (1958) and Biologische Volksordnung (1971) – grew esoteric and distinctly ideological. Advancing a völkisch worldview grounded in holistic metaphysics, biological determinism, and racialised conceptions of social order, Leemann became associated with an extreme-right international network of ex-Nazi or Nazi-adjacent writers and activists that included Einar Åberg, Savitri Devi, and Johann von Leers. He died in Salzburg.

== See also ==
- List of Lamiaceae of South Africa
