= The Spotlight =

Former U.S. newspaper (1975-2001)

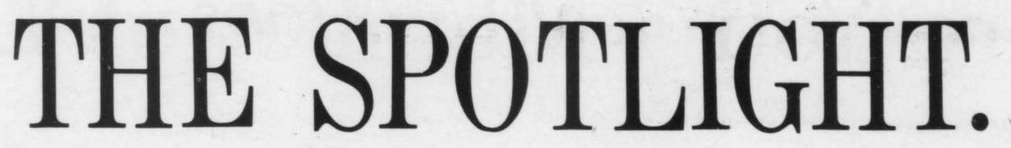
- Logo used from 1987 to 1999

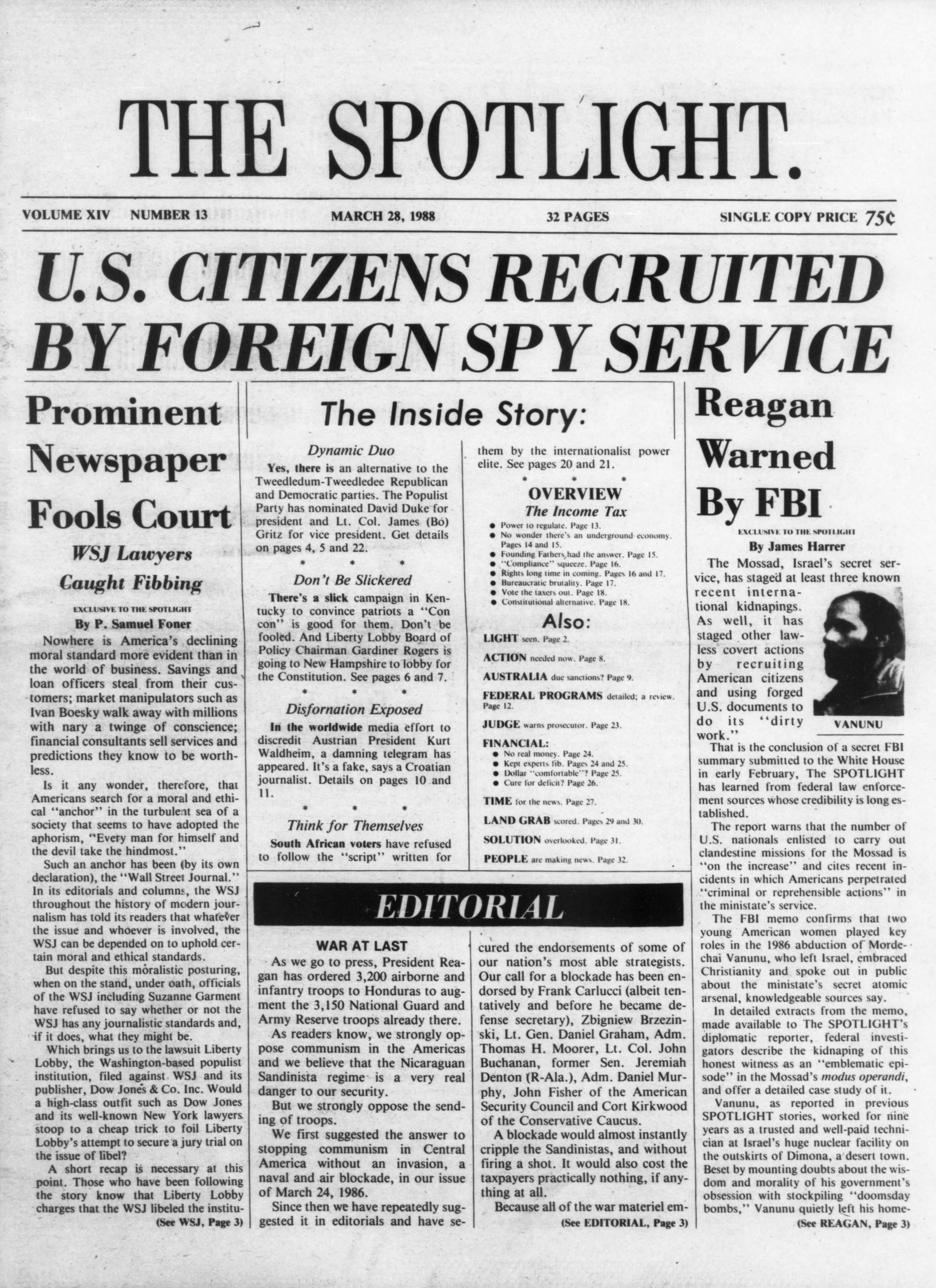
- Volume XIV, no. 13, March 28, 1988 front page
- Type: Weekly newspaper
- Publisher: Liberty Lobby
- Founded: September 1975
- Ceased publication: July 2001
- Language: English
- Headquarters: Washington, D.C.
- Country: United States
- ISSN: 0191-6270
- OCLC number: 956042759

The Spotlight was a weekly newspaper in the United States, published in Washington, D.C. from September 1975 to July 2001 by the now-defunct far-right political advocacy organization Liberty Lobby. It was formed as a replacement for the Liberty Lobby's previous newspaper, the Liberty Letter. The Spotlight ran articles and editorials professing a "populist and nationalist" political orientation. Some observers have described the publication as promoting a right-wing, or conservative, politics.

After a lawsuit against Liberty Lobby brought by the Holocaust denial organization the Institute for Historical Review, the newspaper was shuttered in 2001. Some of those involved in the paper went on to found the American Free Press, a similar publication.

== History ==
The Spotlight was founded in 1975 as the newspaper of the far-right political advocacy organization Liberty Lobby. The Liberty Lobby was founded by far-right political activist Willis Carto; The Spotlight was one of numerous periodicals that Carto operated throughout his career. It was a replacement for the Liberty Lobby's previous paper, the Liberty Letter, which had ceased that year. It was founded as the National Spotlight, but this was later shortened to The Spotlight.

The Spotlight ceased publication in 2001 after Liberty Lobby was forced into bankruptcy as a result of a lawsuit brought by former associates in the Institute for Historical Review. Carto and other people involved in The Spotlight then started a new newspaper, the American Free Press. In terms of content the paper is basically identical to its predecessor.

An August 2, 2002 court order in the Superior Court of California transferred the assets of Liberty Lobby, including The Spotlight, to the judgment creditor, the Legion for the Survival of Freedom, Inc. who maintains an online archive of Spotlight articles from 1997 to 2001.

== Contents and profile ==
The Spotlight was published weekly. It was tabloid in style. The Spotlight ran articles and editorials professing a "populist and nationalist" political orientation. Some observers have described the publication as promoting a right-wing, or conservative, politics. It was founded as a 12-page issue, this later increasing to 20 pages. The paper focused on stories it considered ignored by the mainstream press; American media watchdog Project Censored listed it on multiple occasions as one of the publishers of the most censored stories of the year.

The paper was far-right in orientation, but unlike most other far-right periodicals it has a wide range of topics and was able to attract a much broader readership; rather than embracing only one faction of the far-right, it served as a "big tent" periodical. Frequent focuses of the paper included tax resistance, anti-government, and anti-banking themes, particularly in its opposition to the Bilderberg Group, to which it attributed a vast globalist conspiracy. Scholar George Michael noted it as attempting to appeal to the many disparate factions of the far-right, writing that it was known for "promoting themes of interest to militias, antiglobalists, conspiracy theorists, Holocaust revisionists, and white racialists", but noted that "its anti-Semitism was more concealed than in other racialist right-wing organs". Michael Collins Piper, a writer for the paper, wrote about their goal, mindset, and motives, stating that:

We try to reach as many people as possible as what you would describe as far right. A lot of people in the far right don't like the Spotlight. Some people in the skinhead movement think the Spotlight is too tame whereas some of the people in the tax protest movement think the Spotlight is too radical. They think by not saying Israel or by not doing this or not doing that the ADL will realize they're just good American patriots. Whereas the skinheads come back and say, “Well you don’t call the problem for what it is. It's the Jews or this or that or what have you.” The Spotlight is trying to cover all areas of the far right and try to cover areas of interest for everybody. We've been called a National Enquirer of the far right. We do perceive ourselves as a newspaper. We do try to cover the news of what is happening at the national level in a way that is digestible to, not just the far right, but the public as whole. That's our ideal. Our ideal is to try to be a newspaper that can reach the public and convey a basic point of view.

The Israel-Palestine conflict was a frequent topic of discussion in the paper, which was frequently critical of Zionism. It denied being antisemitic and maintained it was only anti-Zionist, though its rhetoric has been considered antisemitic by scholars. The paper, as with many of Carto's ventures, at times attempted to build bridges with Muslims where there were some ideological commonalities. In 1994, the paper interviewed the far-right Swiss Muslim convert Ahmed Huber, later accused of being a supporter of Al-Qaeda, and Nation of Islam leader Louis Farrakhan granted them an exclusive interview in 1990. Black nationalist writer and segregation advocate Robert Brock also wrote for the periodical.

The Spotlight has been described in media reports as promoting an America First position and giving positive coverage to the political campaigns of Pat Buchanan and David Duke. The Spotlight gave frequent coverage to complementary and alternative medicine, including advertisements for the purported anti-cancer supplement Laetrile. Kevin Flynn and Gary Gerhardt, in their book The Silent Brotherhood, described The Spotlight as regularly featuring "articles on such topics as Bible analysis, taxes and fighting the IRS, bankers and how they bleed the middle class, and how the nation is manipulated by the dreaded Trilateral Commission and Council on Foreign Relations", adding "the paper attracted a huge diversity of readers".

== Controversies ==
=== Lawsuit by E. Howard Hunt ===
On August 14, 1978, The Spotlight published an article by Victor Marchetti linking former CIA agent and Watergate figure E. Howard Hunt to the assassination of John F. Kennedy. Headlined "CIA to Nail Hunt for Kennedy Killing", the article said: "In the public hearings [of a pending Congressional hearing], the CIA will 'admit' that Hunt was involved in the conspiracy to kill Kennedy." It also claimed that the United States House Select Committee on Assassinations had received an internal CIA memo from 1966 that stated the agency "will have to explain Hunt's presence in Dallas on November 22, 1963".

Stating that he was libeled by the accusations, Hunt sued the Liberty Lobby for $3.5 million in damages in a federal court in Miami in 1981; Marchetti was not named as a defendant. Hunt, represented by attorney Ellis Rubin, said that he suffered a $27,000 drop in income after the article was published. He also said that he was in Washington, D.C., on the day that Kennedy was killed. Miles McGrane, the attorney for Liberty Lobby stated that Liberty Lobby did not believe that Hunt was involved in the assassination, but that he was going to be made a scapegoat by the CIA. On December 17, 1981, the jury found in Hunt's favor and awarded him $650,000 in damages. The decision was later overturned due to an error in jury instructions.

In the second trial, Hunt was represented by Baltimore attorney William Snyder. Hunt testified that he was in Washington, D.C., with his wife and son when he first heard of the assassination. Snyder told the jury that Hunt had already been cleared in the assassination by various commissions and inquiries. Attorney Mark Lane, author of Rush to Judgment and a leading proponent of the theory that the CIA was responsible for the assassination of Kennedy, represented Liberty Lobby. Lane successfully defended Liberty Lobby against the defamation charges, which became the basis for Lane's book Plausible Denial.

=== Lawsuit by the National Review ===
In 1985, the National Review and its editor, William F. Buckley Jr., were represented by attorney J. Daniel Mahoney during their $16 million libel suit against The Spotlight. The publication was ordered to pay $1,001 to Buckley.

=== Timothy McVeigh ===
After the Oklahoma City bombing it was reported that Timothy McVeigh had taken out a classified advertisement in The Spotlight in August 1993 under the name "T. Tuttle" and had used a telephone card purchased from the newspaper.

== Other activities ==
From 1988 to 2001, the paper sponsored the Radio Free America talk show which was heard on WWCR shortwave and on AM talk radio outlets.

== Influence and reception ==
Scholar George Michael noted it as having been "the most influential and widely read organ of the far right." Circulation of The Spotlight peaked in 1981 at 315,000 but fell to about 90,000 by 1992.

The Spotlight ran articles and editorials professing a "populist and nationalist" political orientation. Some observers have described the publication as promoting a right-wing, or conservative, politics. The Spotlight was called "the most widely read publication on the fringe right" by the Anti-Defamation League, who also stated the newspaper "reflected Carto's conspiracy theory of history" and called the paper antisemitic.

Howard J. Ruff in his 1979 book How to Prosper During the Coming Bad Years praised The Spotlight for its investigative reporting, while criticizing it for a "blatantly biased" right-wing point of view and concluded "there are many things I detest about it, but I wouldn't be without it."

U.S. Congressman and John Birch Society leader Larry McDonald criticized The Spotlight in the Congressional Record in 1981 for purported use of the Lyndon LaRouche movement as a source of news items.

== See also ==
- Anderson v. Liberty Lobby, Inc.
- The Barnes Review
- Ron Paul newsletters
