= Ideology of the National Front (UK) =

United Kingdom political party ideology

The Ideology of the National Front comprises the beliefs held by the National Front, a far-right political party in the United Kingdom. These beliefs, including nationalism, racism, and opposition to Marxism, have been compared to fascism, although the party rejected the term as a description of its political stance.

== Far-right politics, fascism, and neo-Nazism ==
It is interesting that the NF[…]has tried to develop a 'two-track' strategy. On the one hand it follows an opportunistic policy of attempting to present itself as a respectable political party appealing by argument and peaceful persuasion for the support of the British electorate. On the other, its leadership is deeply imbued with Nazi ideas, and though they try to play down their past affiliations with more blatantly Nazi movements, such as Colin Jordan's National Socialist Movement, they covertly maintain intimate connections with small neo-Nazi cells in Britain and abroad, because all their beliefs and motives make this not only tactically expedient but effective.

— Paul Wilkinson, 1981

A far right or extreme right party, the National Front had both commonalities and differences with older far-right groups. Political scientists and historians characterize it as fascist, or neo-fascist. The political psychologist Michael Billig noted that the NF displayed many of fascism's recurring traits: an emphasis on nationalism and racism, an anti-Marxist stance, statism and a support for the retention of capitalism, and a threatening stance towards democracy and personal freedom.

The historian Martin Durham stated that the NF—like France's National Front and Germany's The Republicans—represented "the direct descendants of classical fascism". Its fascism was nevertheless not identical to that of the 1930s, and the sociologist Christopher T. Husbands cautioned against trying to understand it through comparisons with Italian Fascism or German Nazism as they existed when they were in power.

The NF rejected the term "fascist" to describe itself. As well as denying its leaders' previous fascist activities, it claimed that it could not be fascist because it took part in elections. The political scientist Stan Taylor argued that this claim was obsolete, for many previous fascist parties—including the British Union of Fascists, the German Nazi Party, and the Italian National Fascist Party—also stood in elections. In avoiding the "fascist" label, the NF was typical of fascist groups operating after the Second World War; these post-war fascists had to contend with the legacy of the war and the Holocaust, and thus tried to hide their intellectual pedigrees from voters. The NF's founders tried to present it as a nationalist party unconnected to historical fascism, recognizing that this would be vital if it were to succeed as an electoral force. To do so it adopted "new labels, styles and tactics" to present itself as a "respectable political party".

As with other politically extreme groups, the image the Front presented to the public was a limited and more moderate version of the ideology of its inner core of members. As noted by Billig, the NF's "ideological core, and its genocidal tendencies, are hidden" so as not to scare off potential recruits sympathetic to its nationalism and anti-immigration stance but not its antisemitic conspiracy theories. While noting that its views on race departed considerably "from what is normal or acceptable to the average citizen" in the UK, the political scientist Nigel Fielding observed that many of its other views were grounded in what would be considered "popular common-sense opinion" across the political right. In the 1970s, several NF policies were close to the views common in the right wing of the Conservative Party, although Tyndall distanced the NF from conservatism, stating in Spearhead that his party did not stand "for some kind of super-reactionary conservatism — more Tory than the Tories", but was a revolutionary force pursuing a radical transformation of Britain. In proposing radical reform while emphasising ties to the past, Fielding noted that the NF was "not blindly traditionalist" but "wishes to return to what it conceives of as the spirit of the old order", even if its conception of the "old order" was historically inaccurate.

=== Factions ===
During its history, the NF contained various factions with distinct ideological positions. From the party's early days until the 1980 Tyndall/Webster split, its ideology and propaganda output was dominated by the ex-GBM faction. According to Wilkinson, this faction's leadership was "deeply imbued with Nazi ideas" and retained "intimate connections with small Neo-Nazi cells in Britain and abroad". According to Thurlow, the ex-GBM faction oversaw "an attempt to portray the essentials of Nazi ideology in more rational language and seemingly reasonable arguments". He added that the party's leadership in this period displayed a "barely concealed Nazism", and that they treated the party as a means by which to attract those with anti-immigrant sentiments and "convert" them "into fascists". Taylor also regarded the 1970s NF as a Nazi outfit because of its specific fixation on antisemitic conspiracy theories, a feature not present in all fascist groups. In his words, the NF's "full ideology" was, "in a large number of respects", identical to the original German Nazism.

In the late 1970s, the "Populist" faction grew and challenged the ex-GBM faction's dominance; according to Thurlow, its members were "pseudo-Conservative racial populists", representing the party's "non-fascist and ostensibly more democratic element". After Tyndall and Webster were ousted and replaced by Brons and Anderson, a new faction took control of the party whose members regarded themselves as Strasserite, drawing inspiration from German Nazi Party members Otto Strasser and Gregor Strasser. This faction embraced the Third Position ideology and drew inspiration from Gaddafi's Third International Theory; their views have also been characterized as National Bolshevist.

== Racial nationalism ==
One variant of the National Front logo used by the party

The National Front is a British nationalist party, and in its early policy statements declared that it "pledged to work for the restoration of full national sovereignty for Britain in all affairs". It rejected internationalism and thus opposed both liberalism and communism, contrasting their internationalist espousal of universal values with its view that different nations should have their own distinct values.

Labelling itself a racial nationalist party, the NF's concept of nationalism was bound up with that of race. NF members typically referred to themselves as "racialists", while Durham stated that the NF was "undeniably a racist organisation". It claimed that humanity divides up into biologically distinct races with their own physical and social characteristics. Although some of its published material referred purely to a division between "white" and "black" races, elsewhere it referred to a wider array of racial groups, among them the "Nordics", "Caucasoids", "Negroids", "Semites", and "Turco-Armonoids". It claimed that within racial groups can be found "nations", a form of "race within a race"; many party activists nevertheless used the terms "race" and "nation" interchangeably.

The essential facet of nationalism in the NF ideology is the belief that Britain forms an entity that cannot be dismantled without irreparable harm and that the maintenance of British culture requires the exclusion of outsiders.

— Political scientist Nigel Fielding, 1981

The NF claimed the existence of a distinct British racial "nation", all the members of which shared common interests; Welsh nationalism and Scottish nationalism were condemned as threats to British racial unity. It viewed class as a false and needless distinction among the British race, rejecting the concept of class war as "nonsense", and—like most fascist groups—tried to attract support across class boundaries. For the NF, patriotism was deemed essential to the cohesion and morale of the British nation, with nationalism being regarded as a vital component of patriotism. Members of the National Front regarded themselves as British patriots, and the party made heavy use of British patriotic symbolism, such as that of the Union Flag and of Remembrance Day.

Fielding believed that the "dialectic of insiders and outsiders" was the "linchpin of its ideology", and noted that the NF's "rigid boundaries between in-group and out-group" was typical of the far-right. In its 1974 electoral manifesto, the NF called for a "vigorous birth-rate" among the white British, claiming that any ensuing overpopulation of the UK could be resolved by emigration to the British Commonwealth. Tyndall defended Nazi Germany's lebensraum policy, and under his leadership the NF promoted imperialist views about expanding British territory to serve as "living space" for the country's growing population. As of 1979, the party was combining this policy with eugenicist ideas, calling for the improvement of the quality as well as the quantity of the white British racial group. By 2011, the party's website was utilizing the Fourteen Words slogan: "We must secure the existence of our people and a future for white children."

== White supremacism ==
The National Front is a white supremacist party. Rejecting the concept of racial equality, it argued that different races can be ranked on a hierarchy based on differing abilities. It believed that the "higher races" struggle against one another for world domination, and that racial segregation was natural and ordained by God. It promoted the conspiracy theory that non-whites were intentionally encouraged to migrate to Britain and other white-majority countries to breed with the indigenous inhabitants and thus bring about "white genocide" through assimilation. It opposed inter-racial marriage and miscegenation—typically referring to the latter as "mongrelisation"—and displayed particular anxiety about black men seducing white women.

The NF claimed that most non-white racial groups were genetically inferior to "Caucasoids and Mongoloids". It claimed that whites are inherently superior to blacks, with the latter contributing nothing to humanity. In the mid-1970s, Tyndall used Spearhead to claim that "the negro has a smaller brain and a much less complex cerebral structure" than white Europeans; in the early 1980s, Nationalism Today carried articles maintaining that black Africans had lower average IQs than white Europeans and thus were unfit "to go to white schools" or "live in white society". In depicting black people, the NF promoted what Billig characterised as "an image of savagery and primitiveness"; its published material presented black people as dirty and unhygienic, infected with disease, and incapable of governing themselves. Spearhead featured references to black people being cannibals, and at least one article claimed they ate dirt and faeces.

The NF claimed its racial prejudice arose from a natural human desire for racial preservation rather than mere hatred; thus, it sought to present itself as being more than a hate group. The party wanted to establish academic support for its racial views, placing great importance on scientific racist publications. Its booklist offered academic and quasi-academic books endorsing scientific racism, and early party literature regularly referenced the work of Hans Eysenck, William Shockley, Arthur Jensen, and Richard Herrnstein. Spearhead and other NF publications repeatedly cited articles from the scientific racist journal Mankind Quarterly. In citing these studies, the party claimed that its views were scientific and that those who rejected them were not. Fielding nevertheless observed that the NF's racial views rely "as much on blind assertion, on faith, as on 'scientific' sources".

== Anti-immigrationism and repatriation ==
The cornerstone of the National Front's manifesto since 1974 has been the compulsory deportation of all non-white immigrants, along with their descendants, as well as the white British partners in mixed-race relationships. It stated that the "repatriation" process could take ten years, adding that before deportation, non-whites would be stripped of British citizenship and placed behind white Britons when it comes to access to welfare, education, and housing. It accompanied this with a call to prohibit future non-white migration to Britain. In the 1970s, the NF stated that it did not oppose the arrival of white immigrants from Commonwealth countries, but called for "firm controls" on the migration of whites from other countries.

The NF upholds the wish of the majority of the British people for Britain to remain a White country and for this reason opposes all coloured immigration into Britain. It further advocates the repatriation, by the most humane means possible, of those coloured immigrants already here, together with their descendants and dependants.

— The NF's Statement of Policy

During its first decade, the party emphasised the claim that it was the politicians who enabled immigration—rather than migrants themselves—who were to blame. In 1969, it stated: "Your enemies are not the coloured immigrants, but the British government which let them come in hundreds of thousands." The NF claimed that non-white migration to Britain was masterminded by communists and promoted by the Labour Party, who believed it would boost their vote, and the Conservative Party, who saw migrants as cheap labour. Its early manifestos and other publications generally avoided describing non-whites with derogatory terms like "wog" or "nigger", although such language was used at party rallies. As it developed, the NF press included racially inflammatory headlines like "Black Savages Terrorize Old Folk" and "Asians Import Bizarre Sex-Murder Rites", also comparing non-white migrants with vermin by describing areas with large African and Asian communities as "immigrant-infested".

The NF linked other political themes to race and immigration, and targeted concerns among the white British population about immigrants being competition for jobs, housing, and welfare. Among the "standard forms of NF propaganda" was the claim that immigrants carried diseases like leprosy and tuberculosis, that they placed a heavy burden on the National Health Service (NHS), and that incompetent and poorly trained migrant staff were detrimental to the NHS. It maintained that school quality was eroded by black pupils, that the employment of black workers left many whites unemployed, and that blacks were a source of crime. It claimed that immigrants evaded taxes, and that they were arrogant, aggressive, and unhygienic in the workplace. This anti-immigrant discourse was similar to that employed against Ashkenazi Jewish migrants in the late 19th century and also echoed the response to gypsies and Huguenots in 17th-century England.

== Antisemitism ==
The NF is racially antisemitic. It claimed that Jews form a biologically distinct race—one of the world's "higher races"—and that they seek to destroy the white "Caucasoid" race by encouraging internal divisions within it and by promoting internationalism and miscegenation to weaken it through racial mixing. This Jewish cabal, the NF argued, orchestrated non-white migration into Britain. The party claimed that the Jewish race did this to plunge other "higher races" in disarray so that they would be left dominant. As related in Spearhead, this achieved, "the Jewish nation would be the only surviving ethnically identifiable population group amid a mongrelised world population", the latter being easier for the Jewish cabal to control. The NF profess the view that those disagreeing with its claims on this issue are ignorant of reality.

Such views are a conspiracy theory, part of a longstanding conspiracist tradition about secretive groups manipulating international events that stretches back to the 18th century. The NF's antisemitic variant of this myth owes much to the 19th century Protocols of the Elders of Zion, a Russian antisemitic forgery, and is virtually identical to claims previously articulated by the British Union of Fascists (BUF). Whereas the BUF was explicit in presenting this global conspiracy as being run by Jews, the NF—aware of considerable public disapproval of antisemitism following the Holocaust—was more circumspect, using code-words like "Money Power", "internationalist", "cosmopolitan", "alien", "rootless", "shifty", "money-lenders", and "usurers" in place of "Jews".

In the 1970s, the NF rejected the characterisation of its policies as "anti-Semitism". Instead, it called itself "anti-Zionist", claiming that it only opposed "Zionists" rather than all Jews. Within the NF, the word "Zionism" is not used in the commonly understood manner—to describe the ideology promoting the formation of a Jewish state—but rather applied to the Jewish cabal secretly manipulating the world. For instance, one issue of Spearhead stated that "the twin evils of International Finance and International Communism" are "perhaps better described as International Zionism". Fielding observed that in the party, the term "Zionist" was used indiscriminately and without precision, often against any of its critics, and that its activists often exhibited antisemitic attitudes.

Many of the Front's central members—among them Chesterton, Tyndall, and Webster—had a long history of antisemitic activity before joining the party. For instance, in 1963, Tyndall claimed that "Jewry is a world pest wherever it is found in the world today. The Jews are more clever and more financially powerful than other people and have to be eradicated before they destroy the Aryan peoples." In an early edition of Spearhead, Tyndall stated: "if Britain were to become Jew-clean she would have no nigger neighbours to worry about... It is the Jews who are our misfortune: T-h-e J-e-w-s. Do you hear me? THE JEWS?" While some of its senior members had previously called for a genocide of the Jews, the party itself engaged in Holocaust denial, referring to the Holocaust as "the six million myth" in its literature. In promoting Holocaust denial, NF members might be trying to rehabilitate Hitler and the Nazi regime among the British population. It is possible that most senior NF figures are aware that the Holocaust really happened, but deny its occurrence solely for tactical reasons.

== Government and the state ==
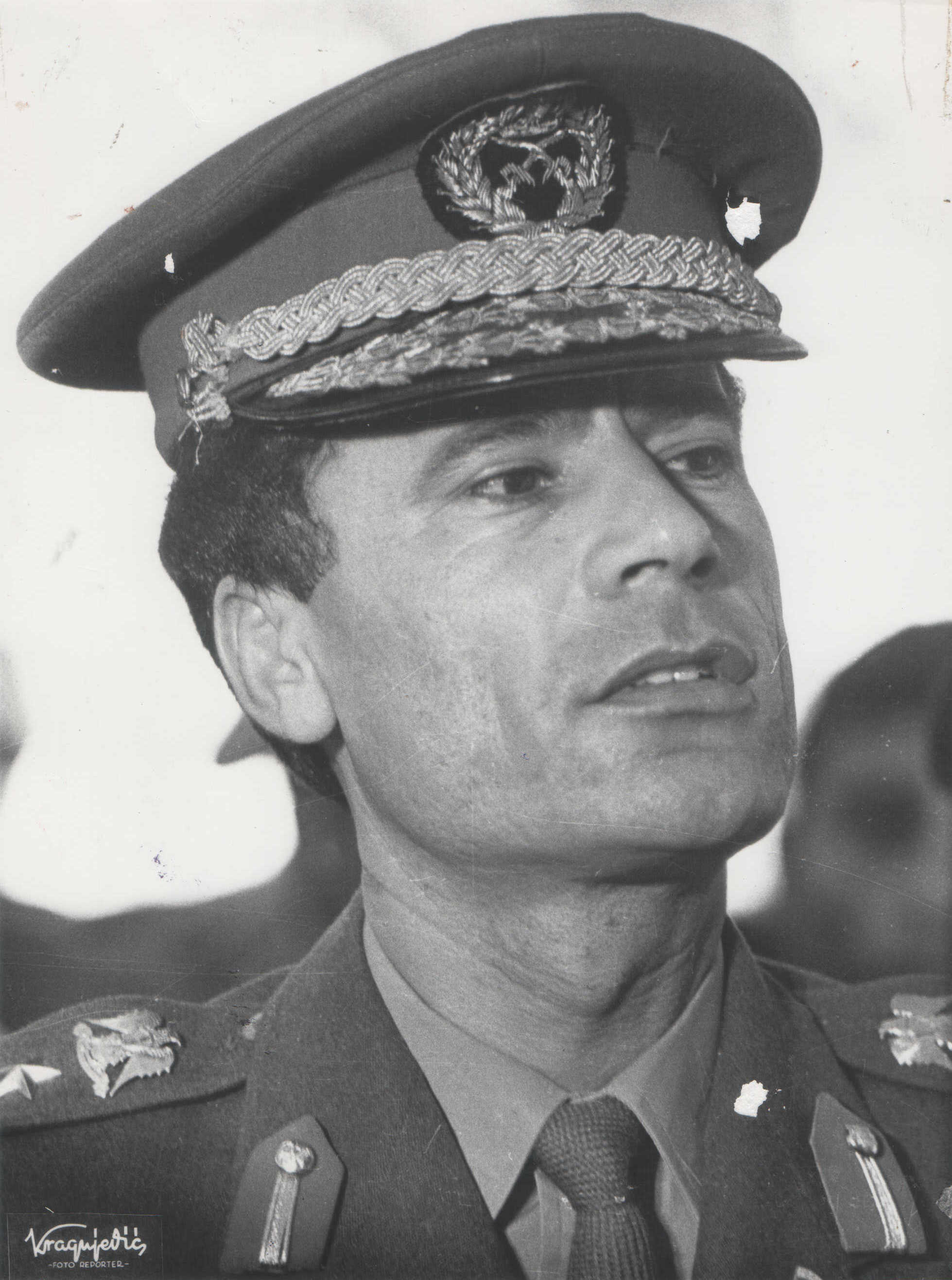
When the Strasserite faction took control of the National Front in the 1980s, it based its views of future government on the ideas in The Green Book of Muammar Gaddafi (pictured).

According to Fielding, the NF's commitment to parliamentary democracy was "not ideological but functional." During the 1970s, the Front alleged that the UK's liberal democracy was "bogus democracy" and declared that it would forge "a genuinely democratic political system", introducing public referendums on major issues. In making claims such as that "true democracy is that which is representative of the will of the people", the latter being presented as a monolithic entity, the NF engaged in populist rhetoric. Fielding nevertheless believed that "the essence of the NF ideology is incompatible with democracy" and instead reflects an "elitist tendency" quite at odds with the "populist rhetoric" that it used to promote its message.

The NF saw democracy as a luxury that was subordinate to the cause of preserving the nation. In Spearhead, Tyndall stated that although he would support parliamentary democracy if he thought it in the national interest, "the survival, and the national recovery of Britain stand as top priority over all. We will support whatever political methods are necessary to attain that end." He called for governance by a strong leader, an individual unencumbered by political parties and elections so that they could focus on the national interest rather than the interests of sub-groups or short-term considerations. In Spearhead, Tyndall stated that "it is only in banana republics, where the 'sophisticated' Western institutions of a multi- or two-party system, powerful trade unions and a 'free' press have not yet taken root, that there is still scope for men of real personality and decision to emerge and truly lead." It also expressed support for the retention of the British monarchy. Observing that "there is in NF ideology a strong orientation to charismatic leadership and authoritarian control", Fielding believed that had the NF achieved political office it would have marginalised parliament and governed in a totalitarian manner.

Under the party's Strasserite leadership during the 1980s, the NF adopted a radically different position on governance, influenced heavily by the Third International Theory propounded by Libya's leader Muammar Gaddafi in his The Green Book. It promoted the establishment of communal political structures, with street councils, area councils, county councils, and a National People's Council "for each of the British Nations". In its view of this future, the British population would be armed and trained in military tactics, allowing for the establishment of local militias rather than a state-controlled professional army.

== International institutions and relations ==
From its early years, the Front opposed the UK's membership of the European Economic Community (EEC), deeming it a threat to British national sovereignty, and seeing the EEC as part of the international Jewish conspiracy's plan for a one world government. During the early 1970s it called on members to obstruct the EEC bureaucracy in any way possible, urging them to "defy the law – be prepared to go to prison too as a gesture of defiance" against the EEC. In March 1975 it sought affiliation with the National Referendum Campaign (NRC), then campaigning for the UK to leave the EEC in that year's referendum. After the NRC rejected the offer, NF members disrupted an NRC meeting at London's Conway Hall.

The National Front called for the UK's withdrawal from the European Economic Community (flag pictured).

To replace the EEC, the NF called for the UK to establish stronger links with the "White countries" of the British Commonwealth, namely Canada, Australia, and New Zealand, but also the white-minority governments of Rhodesia and South Africa. According to the Front, this would "strengthen the ethnic, cultural and family ties between peoples of British stock all over the world". It stated that an NF-led UK would not remain allied to the United States because the latter was dominated by the Jewish world conspiracy, and called for withdrawal from the North Atlantic Treaty Organisation, with Britain instead boosting its defensive capabilities by producing more nuclear weapons. It stipulated that it would cease the payment of foreign aid, and called for withdrawal from the United Nations, claiming that the organisation was a "major weapon of International Finance" and unduly impacted by a "Communist and AfroAsian [sic] influence".

During the 1970s the Front was British unionist, advocating for the unity of the United Kingdom. From the late 1960s onward, it supported the Ulster Unionists, deeming Irish republicanism a communist conspiracy to undermine British unity. As NF leader, Tyndall insisted that Britain must "destroy [Irish] republicanism, not just violent republicanism – as represented by the IRA – but republicanism in every shape and form". In Spearhead, he nevertheless critiqued Northern Ireland's "religious squabbles" between Catholic and Protestant as "absurd". The NF argued that the UK had been too soft in dealing with militant Irish republicans; it argued that military courts should replace civil ones, that IRA members should be interned, and that those guilty of sabotage or murder should be executed. In the early 1970s it alleged that the Irish Republic was harbouring republican militants, "an act of war" that required trade sanctions. In the 1970s the NF endorsed the right-wing Vanguard Unionist Progressive Party, but many Ulster Unionists were suspicious of the NF; in 1973 the Ulster Defence Association proscribed it as "a neo-Nazi movement". In 1985—by which time Strasserites dominated the NF—it called on Northern Ireland to unilaterally declare independence from the UK in response to the Anglo-Irish Agreement.

== Economic policy ==
During the 1970s, the Front claimed to be neither capitalist nor socialist, advocating an economic system drawing on both. It endorsed private enterprise but rejected laissez-faire capitalism, claiming that the latter places the interests of business above that of the nation. It promoted economic nationalism, calling for maximum national self-sufficiency and a rejection of international free trade. In this, it wanted to separate Britain from the international financial system, which it believed was controlled by the Jewish conspiracy. The NF opposed foreign ownership of British industry, arguing that North Sea Oil production should only be in the hands of British companies. Its policies were protectionist and monetarist, advocating the state control of banking and financial services, and calling for a state bank to provide interest free loans to fund the construction of municipal housing. These economic views were common across Britain's far-right, for instance being akin to those of Oswald Mosley and his BUF. Its opposition to unrestricted free markets led various Conservatives to regard it as a socialist party, a classification not endorsed by academic observers.

After the Strasserite faction took control of the party in the 1980s, it adopted distributist policies, maintaining the emphasis on an economic system neither capitalist nor socialist. In the party's material from 1980, it claimed that "Capitalism and Communism" were "twin evils" to be overcome by "Revolutionary Nationalism". In keeping with the Strasserite's distributist doctrine, the 1980s NF called for all large business and industry to be broken up and redistributed into a tripartite system: small privately owned enterprises, workers' co-operatives, and—in the case of financial institutions and heavy industry—nationalised enterprises. Retaining the party's longstanding economic nationalism, the Strasserite leadership called for the abolition of the stock exchange, with the introduction of import controls and bans on the export of capital. As a solution to unemployment, the party stated that it would encourage urban-to-rural migration, with heavily mechanised agriculture being replaced by small, privately owned, labour-intensive farms. This policy was likely influenced by the far-right's general antipathy toward urban living and its belief in the superiority of rural life.

== Social issues ==
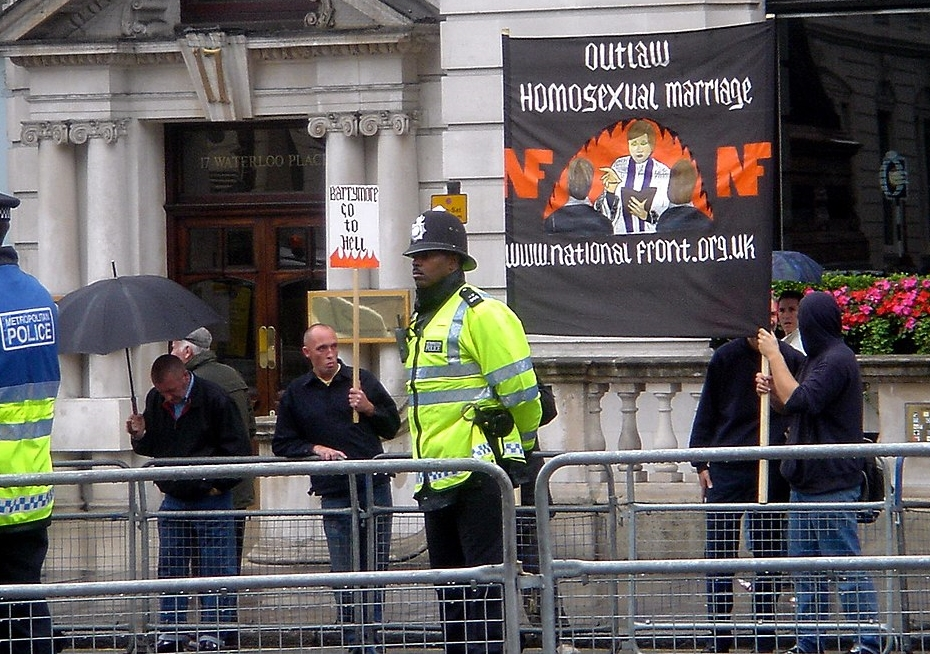
National Front members protesting against growing legal recognition of LGBT rights at the London LGBT Pride march in 2007; the party has tried to protest against various Pride parades

The NF adopted a strong anti-permissive stance. It claimed that what it perceived as the growing permissiveness of British society had resulted in moral decadence and social decay, and alleged that this was orchestrated by the Jewish conspiracy. Tyndall called for a moral "regeneration" penetrating "every sphere of work and leisure", with an NF government criminalising "the promotion of art, literature or entertainment by which public moral standards might be endangered". Although it placed little importance on religion, during the 1970s, the party claimed that God had set forth absolute moral values. While it endorsed Ulster loyalism it did not share its emphasis on defending Protestantism.

The party is anti-feminist, having described feminism as "puerile Marxist rubbish". It is highly critical of changes to traditional gender roles, with Spearhead noting that the NF sees "the feminine role as principally one of wife, mother and home maker". In the party's first year, it largely ignored the 1967 Abortion Act that legalised abortion in Britain, although by 1974 had adopted an anti-abortion stance, stating that abortions should only be legal in medical emergencies. According to Tyndall, the legalisation of abortion was part of a conspiracy to reduce the white British birth rate; he also claimed that the provision of birth control was part of this conspiracy. The issue decreased in resonance within the party during the early 1980s but was re-emphasised when the Strasserites took control: in 1987, National Front News claimed that abortion was "the greatest and most fundamentally evil holocaust that the world has ever seen". The party censures homosexuality, supporting the reintroduction of Section 28 and the recriminalisation of same-sex sexual activity. From its early years, the party has opposed mixed race marriages. During the 1970s, NF activists were involved in anti-prostitution campaigns, and in 1977 joined protests against the Paedophile Information Exchange.

To survive, we've got to become a virile and competitive society. We've got to be a society that demands from its members duty and effort. We've got to be a society that encourages the fit and the strong — a society that instils into its young people from the cradle that nothing worthwhile is ever achieved, either by individuals or by nations, except by work and struggle. We've got to dedicate ourselves to producing, as we used to, young men who are tough and hard.

— NF Chairman John Tyndall

In the 1970s, the NF claimed that the teaching profession was full of communists—in 1978 it issued the leaflet How to Spot a Red Teacher to school pupils—and stated that under an NF government all teachers deemed unsuitable would be fired. That decade, the party stressed its belief that education should be suited to the varying academic abilities of different students although did not outright condemn the comprehensive school system. It called for greater emphasis on examinations and sporting competitions, with a rejection of "slapdash Leftwing-inspired teaching fads". It stated that it would emphasise the teaching of British history to encourage patriotic sentiment, while expanding the place of science and technology in the curriculum at the expense of the social sciences, lambasting the latter as "a mere form of academic Marxism". In further education, it called for stronger emphasis on training in technology and industrial management.

The Front exalts self-sufficiency, asserting that the individual should be willing to serve the state and that citizens' rights should be subordinate to their duties. During the 1970s, the Front expressed opposition to the UK's welfare state as it then existed, instead promoting a self-help ideology. It stated that it would end perceptions of the UK as a "loafer's paradise" by ensuring that all those capable of working do so rather than subsisting on unemployment benefits. It stated that a rudimentary welfare state should nevertheless exist in order to provide support for the "very young, very old, the sick and the disabled".

Since its early years, the NF promoted a tough stance on law and order, calling for harsher sentences for criminals, tougher prisons, and the reintroduction of capital punishment. It rejected the idea that an individual's misdeeds should be attributed to their societal background, placing an emphasis on self-responsibility. The party focused on crimes committed by black people and migrants, and linked racially integrated schools with crime, saying that "every white parent whose children attend racially integrated schools" would be aware of "negro crime ... Rapes, muggings, and even murder". Webster made connections with crime statistics regarding the African-American community in the United States. These, Webster argued, showed that "adult negroids fall below other races in acceptable behaviour", lamenting that "the criminal Blacks cannot help themselves". It also called for the scrapping of the Race Relations Act 1965, arguing that individuals should have the legal right to racially discriminate against others. In the 1970s the party also called for the reintroduction of national service.
