= The Barnes Review =

Holocaust denial magazine

- Cover of the January-February 2012 issue
- Editor: Paul Angel
- Categories: Holocaust denial
- Frequency: Bimonthly
- Founded: 1994; 32 years ago
- First issue: October 1994
- Country: United States
- Based in: Washington, D.C.
- Language: English
- Website: barnesreview.org
- ISSN: 1078-4799
- OCLC: 31094446

The Barnes Review (TBR) is a bimonthly magazine founded in 1994 by Willis Carto and headquartered in Washington, D.C. The magazine is primarily focused on Holocaust denial, though also writes on other topics. It was created as a competitor to the Journal of Historical Review, another Holocaust denial magazine that Carto had founded, after Carto was ousted from its parent organization. The Barnes Review holds annual conferences and is associated with a number of related enterprises.

== History ==
The Barnes Review was established in August 1994 by the American far-right political activist Willis Carto. Carto had previously founded the Institute for Historical Review (IHR), the major Holocaust denial organization in the United States, but was ousted from the organization after a dispute. Carto created The Barnes Review as a competitor to the IHR's Journal of Historical Review.

It was announced in an August 29, 1994 issue of Carto's newspaper The Spotlight. TBR's first issue was dated October 1994. The existence of the periodical, alongside Carto's frequent disputes with other Holocaust deniers, particularly the IHR, created some divisions in the Holocaust denial movement, as participants had to choose between competing groups.

The Liberty Lobby faced a legal battle the IHR and economic issues in the late 1990s. The Barnes Review was one of the few efforts of the Liberty Lobby in the 1990s that was economically successful. Academic George Michael reported that its circulation had surpassed 11,000 by 1995. In 1998, Carto filed for bankruptcy to avoid paying a settlement he owed after losing a lawsuit to the IHR. This led to the closure of the Liberty Lobby in 2001 and Carto's loss of The Spotlight paper; however, he simply immediately founded a new organization and a near-identical newspaper, American Free Press.

The Barnes Review continued being published even after the dissolution of the Liberty Lobby. Michael Collins Piper, who worked on the magazine, told scholar George Michael that The Barnes Review had about 9,000 paid subscribers in 2003, compared to the JHR's 1,000. The Journal of Historical Review later ceased publication, while The Barnes Review continued. Carto died in 2015, and The Barnes Review continued.

In 2021, TBR's YouTube podcast issued a fake interview with Texas state senator Bob Hall, created by splicing his statements to make it seem like he responded to their questions. This created a controversy when Media Matters for America wrote an article criticizing Hall for this, only to have to retract the article. When TBR was informed of the fake they removed the video from their website, their editor claiming that they were unaware it was fake until they were informed.

== Content and profile ==
The Barnes Review is primarily focused on Holocaust denial, though also writes on a number of other topics. The magazine is named after the Holocaust denier Harry Elmer Barnes. Compared to the Journal of Historical Review, it was styled in a less academic fashion, with a greater focus on photographs and illustrations. It is based in Washington, D.C. and is published bimonthly (every two months). Unlike other periodicals operated by Carto, where he tried to hide his involvement, Carto openly displayed his name in association with The Barnes Review. Its first editor was the American journalist George Fowler, succeeded by John Tiffany, then M. Raphael Johnson. As of 2008, its editor was Carto, with Tiffany as assistant editor. Michael Collins Piper was a contributing editor. Carto died in 2015. As of 2021, its executive editor was Paul Angel.

It is nationalistic in orientation. It is frequently sympathetic to Nazi Germany and other fascist figures, and portrays Hitler as misunderstood. A 2014 issue was themed around defending Hitler, which, in an editorial for the paper, Piper wrote may "startle" readers. Articles issued by TBR include ones titled: "The Rise and Fall of the Jewish Reich" “and "Adolf Hitler — An Overlooked Candidate for the Nobel Prize?" Instead, it frequently critiques allied military leaders, particular Franklin D. Roosevelt. It blames Jews for a variety of atrocities, accusing them of being "the principal agents of the degeneration of Western civilization". It has discussed a number of other genocides, including the Holodomor and the Tasmanian genocide; George Michael considered that this was in an effort "to relativize the Holocaust". A key focus of the magazine's attacks on Jews is Israel, including Israel's mistreatment of the Palestinian people, Mossad, and Zionism, which it describes as an inherently racist and apartheid system. Like many of Carto's other publications, The Barnes Review at times sought to build alliances with Muslims who were critical of Israel. It printed an article by a Muslim writer discussing collaboration between Muslims and Nazi Germany. It has promoted the white supremacist Christian Identity ideology.

Udo Walendy was a regular writer for the periodical, and several articles by Léon Degrelle appeared in TBR. American far-right writer Eustace Mullins was a contributing editor. British politician Mark Cotterill worked for the periodical until he was fired for allegedly stealing its mailing list. Former Mossad officer Victor Ostrovsky, who after leaving the agency became fiercly critical of the organization, wrote an article for the periodical describing his experiences in Mossad and gave a lecture at a Barnes Review conference discussing his experiences.

== Other activities ==
The magazine holds annual conferences in Washington, D.C., linking up a number of figures affiliated with the political far right. Speakers have included Ted Gunderson, black anti-Zionist Anita Belle, Hutton Gibson, Pete McCloskey, Paul Fromm, Oleg Platonov, Edgar Steele, and Ataullah Bogdan Kopański. Carto invited Iranian president Mahmoud Ahmadinejad to the 2006 conference–Ahmadinejad being a major promoter of Holocaust denial–though Ahmadinejad did not take him up on the offer.

The magazine is also connected to a number of related enterprises, including the TBR Bookclub, promoting what the Southern Poverty Law Center (SPLC) describes as "a wide range of extremist books and publications". They also operate a podcast, The Barnes Review History Hour.
