= Theology of Hate =

2009 book by George Michael

- Cover of the first edition
- Author: George Michael
- Language: English
- Subject: World Church of the Creator
- Publisher: University Press of Florida
- Publication date: 2009
- Publication place: United States
- Media type: Print (hardcover)
- Pages: 285
- ISBN: 978-0-8130-3350-1
- OCLC: 259265343
- Dewey Decimal: 299
- LC Class: BP605.C55 M53 2009
- Preceded by: Willis Carto and the American Far Right
- Followed by: Lone Wolf Terror and the Rise of Leaderless Resistance

Theology of Hate: A History of the World Church of the Creator is a 2009 book by George Michael, then a professor of political science at the University of Virginia's College at Wise. It is about the white supremacist organization the World Church of the Creator, and its associated religion, Creativity. Creativity is notable for, unlike much of the far right, totally rejecting Christianity. It was published by University Press of Florida.

It is the first and only book-length work on Creativity. It focuses primarily on tracing the history of the group, though also discusses its theology and broader connections and influence within the white supremacist movement. It received generally positive reviews, with praise for the depth of information it provided, though several reviewers wished it had more analysis.

== Background and publication history ==
George Michael is an American political scientist. At the time of the book's publication, he was a professor of political science at the University of Virginia's College at Wise. He had previously done several studies of far right extremism in the United States. Theology of Hate was published in 2009 by the University Press of Florida in a 285 page hardcover edition. It is the first and only book-length work on Creativity. It is based primarily off of historical material and interviews; Michael interviewed the white supremacist activists William Luther Pierce, George Burdi, and Matthew F. Hale in writing the book.

== Contents ==
Introducing it as a "small racist cult" with a "turbulent history", Michael covers the history of the World Church of the Creator, a white supremacist organization known by various names. They follow the religion Creativity. Michael covers how Creativity was founded in 1973 by Ben Klassen, with the original name of the associated organization being the Church of the Creator (COTC). He biographies Klassen and his path to founding the Church; he traces his antisemitism to his upbringing in the Russian Revolution, and follows his involvement in white supremacism and various types of far-right politics. Dissatisfied by available options, he founded his own white supremacist group, with the associated racial religion of Creativity.

After the chapter on Klassen, Michael devotes a chapter to examining Creativity's theology. Creativity did not have supernatural beliefs, Klassen opposing such beliefs as irrational, instead being solely focused on racial issues; nevertheless, Klassen denied it was atheistic. Creativity is notable for, unlike much of the far right, totally rejecting Christianity, considering it a Jewish plot against the white race. Michael traces its relationship with other white supremacist religious, like William Luther Pierce's Cosmotheism and white supremacist Germanic neopaganism, or Odinism. Michael argues that Creativity, though largely fringe among the far right, demonstrated a comparatively greater influence on it ideologically; he argues that the popularity of racist paganism among the far right stemmed in part from Creativity's criticisms of Christianity and credits it with radicalizing Odinism.

The COTC was led by Klassen until his 1993 suicide, after which the group began to have serious organizational problems. Michael devotes several chapters to the legal issues faced by the group. In the meantime, their ideology continued to have influence due to white power musician George Burdi, an adherent of Creativity and the creator of Resistance Records. Following Klassen's death, there was a succession of leaders, until newcomer Matt Hale took over a new successor organization known as the World Church of the Creator, and revived it. Hale increased the group's media profile and expanded onto the internet until he was imprisoned in 2005 for attempting to orchestrate the assassination of a judge. Michael analyzes Hale's outreach to women. To an unusual degree even for the white supremacist movement, Creativity adherents were prone to violence, with members committing several violent crimes that brought notoriety to the movement; Michael devotes a chapter to the crimes of Benjamin Nathaniel Smith, a Creativity adherent who committed mass murder. Even after Hale's imprisonment, Michael writes that Creativity continues to have followers; he argues that though the fate of the movement is uncertain "it is likely that its ideology will continue to inspire racialist activists in the future".

== Reception ==
Theology of Hate received generally positive reviews, with praise for its depth of information on Creativity. In her 2017 book about white power music, Trendy Fascism, political scientist Nancy S. Love praised it as an excellent overview of the Creativity movement. Ann Burlein, writing for Nova Religio, recommended the book, complimenting its coverage of Creativity theology, as well as its coverage of Creativity in a wider context and in relation to other white supremacist religious movements. Political scientist Martin Durham, writing for the journal Terrorism and Political Violence, said that Michael "draws on his rich experience of studying the extreme right in the USA to examine a group that is important for its involvement in violence, its efforts to recruit women, and its contribution to one of the most noteworthy developments among American extreme rightists". Historian Ryan Shaffer, writing for the Secular Humanist Bulletin, called it an insightful look into the group and praised its coverage of their various legal issues, recommending it as an information source on the group and for its insights on religion and radicalism.

Owing to the largely descriptive nature of the book, several of the reviewers wished for more analysis. Burlein argued that Michael did "not engage with the interesting issues regarding the nature of religion that the material raises". Larycia A. Hawkins argued that Michael should have further contextualized the development of the COTC with a more theoretical backing, rather than a solely historical methodology; she wrote that it should have contextualized Creativity's emergence at the height of the black power movement. She concluded that "in an era where many academics and public intellectuals would like to claim that the United States has entered a post-racial age, George Michael's Theology of Hate reminds us that race matters" and that wrote the subject's "existence runs counter to the contention that the election of the first black President has ushered in a post-racial era".
