= Einar Åberg =

Swedish antisemitic bookseller, pamphleteer and agitator

- Born: April 20, 1890; Gothenburg, Sweden
- Died: October 3, 1970 (aged 80); Sollentuna, Sweden
- Known for: Holocaust denial

Einar Gustaf Vilhelm Åberg (20 April 1890 - 6 October 1970) was a Swedish bookseller, pamphleteer and antisemitic agitator.

Einar Åberg was converted to the cause of antisemitism after reading The Protocols of the Elders of Zion in 1922. He was involved in many antisemitic and National Socialist circles. He had international contacts, including with the Ku Klux Klan in the US and Savitri Devi.

In November 1941, Åberg formed the Anti-Jewish Action League of Sweden, an antisemitic party that mostly consisted only of Åberg himself. The first point in the league's statutes was: "the league's goal is: the total annihilation of Judaism in Sweden". Between 1941 and 1945 he was sentenced to fines on nine occasions for his antisemitic agitation.

Åberg's activities led directly to the passage of legislation to prevent agitation against a population group (Swedish: hets mot folkgrupp) in 1948. The resulting law was known as Lex Åberg.

== Background ==
Einar Åberg was born on 20 April 1890, in Gothenburg, Sweden, and died on 6 October 1970, in Sollentuna, Sweden.

Around 1922, Åberg read The Protocols of the Elders of Zion, which converted him to the cause of antisemitism. Åberg then became involved in several anti-Jewish and Swedish Nazi associations and parties, but was never a member of them. He had international contacts, including the Ku Klux Klan and Savitri Devi, who was also openly Nazi and active in Europe's post-war Nazi and Fascist networks. Some of Åberg's earliest contacts were with American Klan groups, with contacts that date into the 1920s.

Åberg began his publishing and pamphleteering in 1933 and was heavily active during the 1930s. During this time, he published scores of pamphlets as well as several books, including his own translation of The Protocols.

In the early 1930s, Åberg worked at a Stockholm book shop owned by Carl-Ehrenfried Carlberg, prominent Swedish supporter of Nazism. While continuing his work for Carlberg, in 1934 Åberg began also working for Nationen, working on the editorial board until 1936. He also worked Kingdom of Sweden (in Swedish: Svea Rike), a nationalist antisemitic news sheet.

== World War II ==
During the war years, Einar Åberg formed the Anti-Jewish Action League of Sweden (in Swedish: Sveriges Antijudiska Kampförbund). The group was founded in 1941 and was small, often consisting only of Åberg himself.

The first point of the so-called league's statutes read: "the goal is: the total annihilation of Jewry in Sweden". The organization was later disbanded, but Åberg continued his political work.

In October 1941, Åberg bought a bookstore, on which he covered the shop window with an infamous sign saying: "Jews and half-Jews not allowed here". This caused upset reactions among locals, and fights and brawls broke out several times outside the shop. Åberg was sentenced to fines for aggravated behavior and was ordered to take down the sign. He then merely changed the sign to one saying: "only Swedes allowed".

Between 1941 and 1945 he was sentenced on nine occasions to fines for his antisemitic agitation. He wandered the streets with a sandwich board accusing the Jews of being the cause of World War II, which led to several street fights with anti-racist locals.

== After the war ==
He who has discovered the truth about Judaism, and who does not fight Jewry and warn his fellow-citizens of the Jewish manace, becomes an accomplice of the jews and an accessory to the misfortunes of his nation.

— Einar Åberg

When the Holocaust became widely known in the aftermath of WWII, Åberg was one of the first living persons to deny it had happened. Åberg continued his activities even after the end of the war when he specialized in printing and distributing antisemitic leaflets and brochures. These were translated into many different languages and distributed to several countries. Åberg is arguably "the father of Holocaust denial", having began these activities a full three years before the works of Maurice Bardèche (1947) and Paul Rassinier (1948) were released.

In 1945, Åberg became editor of Hammaren, a Swedish version of Der Stürmer.

Individuals like Åberg who had been deeply engaged in Nazi organizations or who had actively supported and spread Nazi ideology were viewed as committed Nazis. Even after 1945, many continued to defend Nazism, Adolf Hitler, and the Third Reich. Following the end of the Second World War, people like Åberg became heavily stigmatized and were largely excluded from public life, serving as cautionary examples intended to discourage others.

== International propaganda ==
In 1946, Åberg's propaganda efforts became international. His contacts ranged from other Scandinavian countries, to Germany, England, the US, and South Africa.

In 1947, antisemitic polemicist Arnold Leese spent a year in an English prison for distributing Åberg's materials.

An ACLU report on the 1949 Peekskill anticommunist race riots noted that areas in Peekskill had been plastered with stickers reading "Communism is treason. Behind communism stands—the Jew! Therefore, for my country—against the Jews". The stickers were identical in content and design to stickers mailed to the United States by Einar Åberg, often disseminated with antisemitic literature.

The 1950s brought Åberg into contact with James H. Madole. According to a report from the House Un-American Activities Committee, Åberg was the primary overseas contact for Madole's National Renaissance Party and Åberg was sending English language materials for Madole to disseminate.

Åberg published and disseminated any antisemitic materials he thought might advance the cause. Many of his materials were stamped with a quote from Edmund Burke: "All that is necessary for the triumph of evil is that good men do nothing."

Åberg was a delegate to the 1951 Malmö congress that established the European Social Movement, a neo-fascist European political alliance set up to promote pan-European nationalism. That same year, Switzerland took action to ban all of Åberg's antisemitic material and barred Åberg from visiting the country.

In 1952, Eustace Mullins published a fabricated speech titled Our Race Will Rule Undisputed Over The World purported to have been given by a Rabbi Emanuel Rabinovich to an "Emergency Council of European Rabbis" in Budapest, Hungary, 12 January 1952. Mullins published the text in Common Sense, which he then sent to Åberg, who reproduced the text in tract form and distributed it internationally. In October, 1952, Director of Central Intelligence General Walter Bedell Smith received a copy of the tract published by Åberg.

Åberg republished many other works of American antisemites such as A Hidden Hand in the War Between the States by Hal Stearley. He published a tract titled Whose Is the Hidden Hand in 1958.

Åberg's best-known American correspondent was George Lincoln Rockwell and Åberg distributed Rockwell's What the Jews Say about Themselves. Rockwell had hoped to gather an international following of scattered National Socialists under a single group known as the World Union of National Socialists. This proved to be less than successful as many feared the stigmatization of associations with Nazism. Rockwell corresponded with Åberg in 1958 to express his frustration; but by that time, Åberg was not interested in the fight nor joining the WUNS.

A 1962 issue of Rockwell's The Cross and the Flag included a biography of Åberg and the story of a 1947 attempt by the American Jewish Committee to have Swedish medical authorities declare Åberg clinically insane and have him institutionalized.

Åberg retired from his activities in 1964 and died in 1970.

== Lex Åberg ==
Åberg's journalistic activities brought strong reactions among recipients abroad. Swedish missions around the world were courted with the remarks that Åberg's antisemitic activities could cause damage to Sweden abroad, which led to legislation to prevent agitation against a population group (Swedish: hets mot folkgrupp) in 1948. The resulting law was called Lex Åberg and Åberg was the first person to be convicted under this law. In total, he was convicted about 16 times for incitement against a national group.

The passage of this law in Sweden, New York politician Jacob Javits made attempts at passing similar antisemitic hate speech laws in the United States. Being Jewish himself, the crusade was deeply personal. He corresponded with then Swedish ambassador Erik Boheman regarding Lex Åberg seeking to model similar legislation. While a member of Congress, he sponsored a group libel statute in 1949 known as the Javits-Klein Group Libel bill to make it a federal crime to expose an individual or group to hatred or other injury based on their race or religion. The bill failed to pass, and he tried to introduce a bill a second time in 1952. While serving as Attorney General for the state of New York, he encouraged similar legislation before the state legislature. In 1958, while serving in the US Senate, in the wake of the 1958 Hebrew Benevolent Congregation Temple bombing in Atlanta, he again proposed federal legislation, concluding that it was fanatics who distributed hate literature who were chiefly responsible.

== Legacy ==
American historian Jeffrey Kaplan called Åberg "the Swedish father of antisemitism". Unlike other individuals who were stigmatized as Nazi supporters, Åberg was not forgotten in Sweden. Swedish historian Heléne Lööw points out that Swedish racial ideologists still see him as a source of inspiration and that he is "an amalgam of nearly everything the contemporary militant-race-revolutionaries stand for" including its militant methods and the ideology of the Ku Klux Klan.

Åberg's name became synonymous with antisemitism in Sweden. Tommy Rydén, the head of the Swedish Church of the Creator, proposed the Einar Åberg Foundation, as well as considering adding Åberg's birthday to the calendar for the Swedish Church of the Creator. In 1990, a fund called Einar Åberg's Minnesfond was formed, which is today registered in Linköping.

While Åberg's publishing attracted attention and condemnation from around Europe, his work also provides a measurement against which to compare the current antisemitic activity in Europe. According to Swedish journalist and far-left activist Stieg Larsson, "[when] compared with the current tidal wave of anti-Semitic manifestations with which Europe is currently awash ... Åberg's lampoons seem almost harmless".

Although Åberg is known throughout Sweden for his antisemitic propaganda, his son indicated that he never spoke of it in his home. Einar Åberg is buried with his wife at Sollentuna cemetery.

== Bibliography ==
- Andersson, Lars M. (2024-06-28). "'Until the domination of the Jews is crushed, Sweden is not the land of the Swedes!' : Hammaren as an example of Swedish conspiracist antisemitism, 1943–1945". Nordisk Judaistik/Scandinavian Jewish Studies. 35 (1): 90–111. doi:10.30752/nj.142265.
- Barbas, Samantha (2026). Hate Speech: The Legal and Cultural History of an American Dilemma. Univ of California Press. ISBN 978-0-520-40198-3.
- Benz, Wolfgang; Mihok, Brigitte, eds. (2010). Handbuch Des Antisemitismus Jedenfeindschaft in Geschichte und Gegenwart: Personen [Handbook of Antisemitism: Hostility Towards Jews in History and the Present - Individuals] (in German). Vol. 2. Walter de Gruyter. ISBN 978-3-598-44159-2.
- Berggren, Lena (2000). National Enlightenment: Traits in the History of Swedish Anti-Semitism's Ideas. Carlssons. ISBN 91-7203-875-6.
- Berggren, Lena (2015-01-27). "Antisemitismen vill inte släppa sitt grepp" [Anti-Semitism does not want to let go of its grip]. Svenska Dagbladet (in Swedish).
- Boller, Paul F. & George, John (1990). They Never Said It: A Book of Fake Quotes, Misquotes, and Misleading Attributions. Oxford University Press. pp. 107–108. ISBN 978-0-19-506469-8.
- Ericson, Eric; Wallstén, Susanna (2017). Mannen i Damaskus [The Man in Damascus] (in Swedish). Albert Bonniers förlag. ISBN 978-91-0-016680-9.
- Fagerström, Eskil (2018-08-03). "Einar Åbergs judehat ledde till hetslagen" [Einar Åberg's hatred of Jews led to the incitement act] (in Swedish). Populär Historia.
- Fast, Howard (2011-12-27). Peekskill USA: Inside the Infamous 1949 Riots. Open Road Media. ISBN 978-1-4532-3491-4.
- Granström, Görel (2017-06-20). "Den antisemitiske bokhandlaren och kriminaliseringen av hets mot folkgrupp" [The anti-Semitic bookseller and the criminalization of incitement against people group] (in Swedish). Swedish Committee Against Antisemitism.
- Kaplan, Jeffrey; Lööw, Heléne (2002). The Cultic Milieu: Oppositional Subcultures in an Age of Globalization. Bloomsbury Publishing PLC. ISBN 978-0-7591-0204-0.
- Kaplan, Jeffrey; Weinberg, Leonard (1998). The Emergence of a Euro-American Radical Right. Rutgers University Press. ISBN 978-0-8135-2564-8.
- Karcher, Nicola; Lundström, Markus (2022). Nordic Fascism: Fragments of an Entangled History. Taylor & Francis. ISBN 978-1-000-80468-3.
- Kellman, George (1954). "Anti-Jewish Agitation". The American Jewish Year Book. 55: 72–79. ISSN 0065-8987. JSTOR 23603609.
- Larsson, Stieg (2014). The Expo Files: Articles by the Crusading Journalist. Quercus. ISBN 978-1-62365-065-0.
- Lööw, Helene. "From Lindholmare to Vamare". Vitt Oljud (White Noise). Archived from the original on 8 October 2007.
- Molas, Bàrbara (2022). Canadian Multiculturalism and the Far Right: Walter J. Bossy and the Origins of the 'Third Force', 1930s–1970s. Taylor & Francis. ISBN 978-1-000-63647-5.
- Ohlsson, Birgitta (2010-01-27). "Gör upp med Stockholms sörgårdsidyll" [Make up with Stockholm's garden idyll]. Aftonbladet (in Swedish).
- Östling, Johan (2016). "Nazism as Stigma". Sweden after Nazism: Politics and Culture in the Wake of the Second World War. Oxford: Berghahn Books. ISBN 9781785331428. LCCN 2015046286.
