= Eustace Mullins =

American white supremacist (1923–2010)

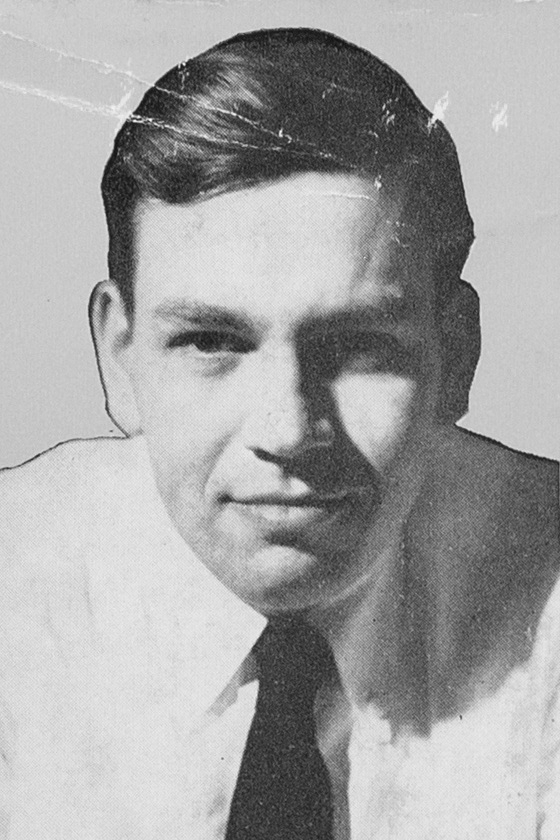
- Mullins in 1961
- Born: Eustace Clarence Mullins Jr. March 9, 1923; Roanoke, Virginia, U.S.
- Died: February 2, 2010 (aged 86); Hockley, Texas, U.S.
- Occupation: Writer
- Known for: Antisemitism, Holocaust denial, conspiracy theories
- Notable work: The Secrets of the Federal Reserve (1952); This Difficult Individual Ezra Pound (1961)

Eustace Clarence Mullins Jr. (March 9, 1923 – February 2, 2010) was an American writer, white supremacist, antisemitic conspiracy theorist, and Holocaust denier. He wrote a variety of articles, books, and pamphlets focused on conspiratorial subject matter over decades. His best-known work is The Secrets of The Federal Reserve, in which he alleged that several high-profile bankers had conspired to write the Federal Reserve Act for their own nefarious purposes, and then induced Congress to enact it into law.

A disciple of the poet Ezra Pound, he was involved with several far-right groups and movements, including the neo-fascist National Renaissance Party and the Patriot movement. A writer for numerous far-right periodicals over the decades, he began his writing career with Conde McGinley's antisemitic paper Common Sense. He also wrote for the National Renaissance Party's journal, the National Renaissance Bulletin, and the far-right paper Women's Voice.

He was known for frequently creating hoaxes, including the nonexistent book A Racial Program for the Twentieth Century and the fabricated speech Our Race Will Rule Undisputed Over The World, which were widely spread in far-right publications. Mullins was also known for filing numerous, typically unsuccessful, lawsuits. The Southern Poverty Law Center described him as "a one-man organization of hate".

== Early life ==
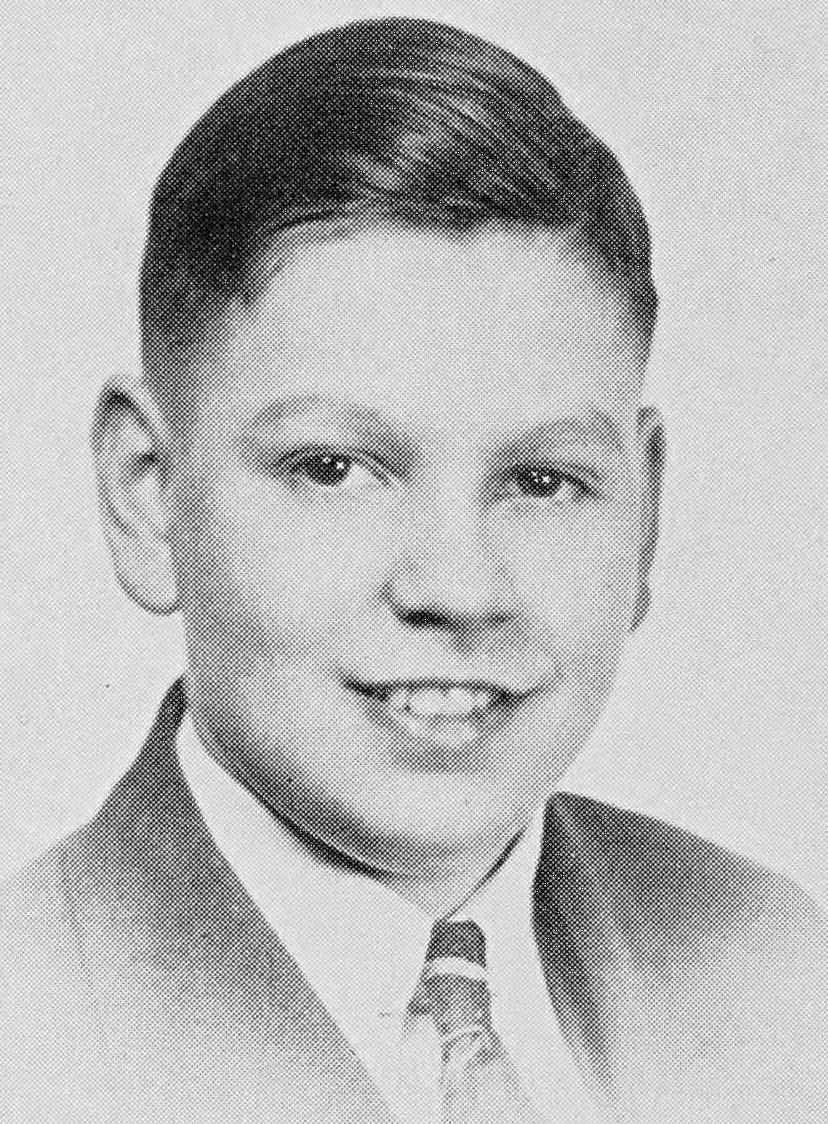
Mullins at Robert E. Lee High School in 1939

Eustace Clarence Mullins Jr. was born on March 9, 1923 in Roanoke, Virginia. He was the third child of Eustace Clarence Mullins and his wife Jane Catherine Muse. His father was a salesman in a retail clothing store. In 1934, he moved with his family to Staunton, Virginia.

In December 1942 he enlisted in the military as a Warrant Officer at Charlottesville, Virginia. He was a veteran of the United States Army Air Forces, serving thirty-eight months during World War II.

He attended Washington and Lee University, from which he graduated in 1949.

== Career ==
=== Library of Congress and Ezra Pound ===
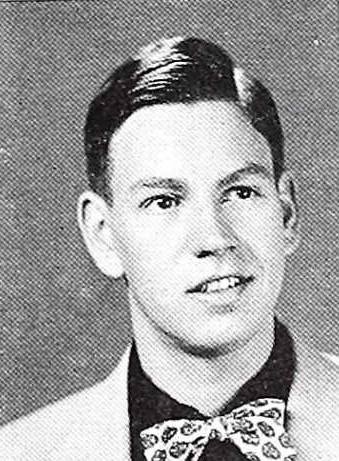
Mullins at Washington and Lee University in 1948

After college, he moved to Washington, D.C., where he worked at the Library of Congress as a photographic researcher. In 1950, Mullins helped Senator Joseph McCarthy research in making claims about Communist Party funding sources. He later stated that he believed McCarthy had "started to turn the tide against world communism".

In 1949 Mullins worked at the Institute for Contemporary Arts, where he met Ezra Pound's wife Dorothy, who introduced him to her husband. Pound was at the time incarcerated in St. Elizabeth's Hospital for the Mentally Ill. The two became friends; Mullins often visited the poet while he was detained, and for a time acted as his secretary. In 1951, Mullins wrote a short poetry collection, self-published, titled His Spirit-Tower.

Mullins created several one-man "letterhead" organizations, including the "Aryan League of America". In his correspondence with Pound, Mullins exclaimed "THE JEWS ARE BETRAYING US", in a letter written on Aryan League of America stationery. Later, he wrote a biography, This Difficult Individual Ezra Pound (1961), which literary critic Ira Nadel describes as "prejudiced and often melodramatic".

Shortly after The Secrets of The Federal Reserve came out in 1952, he was discharged by the Library of Congress for his writing and distribution of "violently anti-Semitic articles".

=== Far-right politics ===
Mullins was involved with a number of extremist right-wing and neofascist groups from the early 1950s through the 1990s. These included James H. Madole's organization, the National Renaissance Party (NRP). In the early 1950s Mullins regularly spoke in public at NRP demonstrations. His then-roommate was Matt Koehl, later the leader of the American Nazi Party but at that time head of the NRP's "Security Echelon Guard." Mullins wrote for the NRP's journal, National Renaissance Bulletin. He was a frequent speaker for the NRP and listed them among his affiliations in a 1956 press release. Ezra Pound expressed concerns that Mullins's close relationship with the NRP would tie him to the organization, as did Pound devotee John Kasper, but a rumored newspaper expose never materialized.

In the 1950s, Mullins began his career as an author writing for Conde McGinley’s antisemitic newspaper Common Sense, to which he was a frequent contributor. He also wrote for Lyrl Clark Van Hyning's Chicago-based antisemitic newsletter, Women's Voice.

From April 1953 until April 1954, Mullins was employed by the American Petroleum Industries Committee (APIC). He was cited in 1954 as a "neo-Fascist" by the House Un-American Activities Committee, which noted in particular his article "Adolph Hitler: An Appreciation", written in 1952, in which he compared Hitler to Jesus and described both as victims of Jews. In 1956 he sued the APIC for breach of contract, charging that the group had hired him as a sub rosa propagandist to undermine Zionism, but failed to live up to a verbal agreement to pay him $25,000 for his covert services. The APIC responded that Mullins had been hired “as one of several economist-writers in a subordinate capacity", and denied that he had been employed “in any capacity at any time for the purpose he [alleged].″ The lawsuit, like many others filed by Mullins over the years, was eventually dismissed. He also sued George E. Sokolsky, King Features Syndicate, and The Washington Post in 1961 over a story Sokolsky had written about him for King Features. The case was thrown out.

In the late 1950s Mullins also collaborated with "scientific racist" Robert Kuttner, an associate editor of Charles Lee Smith's magazine, The Truth Seeker, in theorizing Kuttner's ideas on white supremacy. They cofounded the Institute for Biopolitics in 1958 in order to popularize Kuttner's theories and their precursors in the work of Morley Roberts.

Mullins was also a painter. In 1962, he attempted to use one of his paintings, "Karl Marx Contemplating the Bust of Venus", to cover a $600 bill he owed to the IRS. He received no response.

Eustace Mullins's home at 126 Madison Place in Staunton, Virginia

To care for his sick mother, Mullins returned to Staunton in the 1970s and remained there after her death, living in the house at 126 Madison Place where he grew up, through the end of his life. By the mid-1990s Mullins was "considered a national leader" in the constitutional militia movement. He spoke regularly to militia groups across the United States during this time. The Secrets of the Federal Reserve provided, in part, the theoretical underpinning of the movement's conspiracy theories about a secretive cabal of wealthy families controlling the international monetary system.

In the 1990s and 2000s, Mullins wrote for Criminal Politics. Mullins was on the editorial staff of the American Free Press and became a contributing editor to the Barnes Review, both published by Willis Carto's Liberty Lobby. In 2000, he sued the local newspaper the Daily News Leader, this time suing thrice over a story they had written about him, all of which were eventually thrown out.

== Writings and views ==
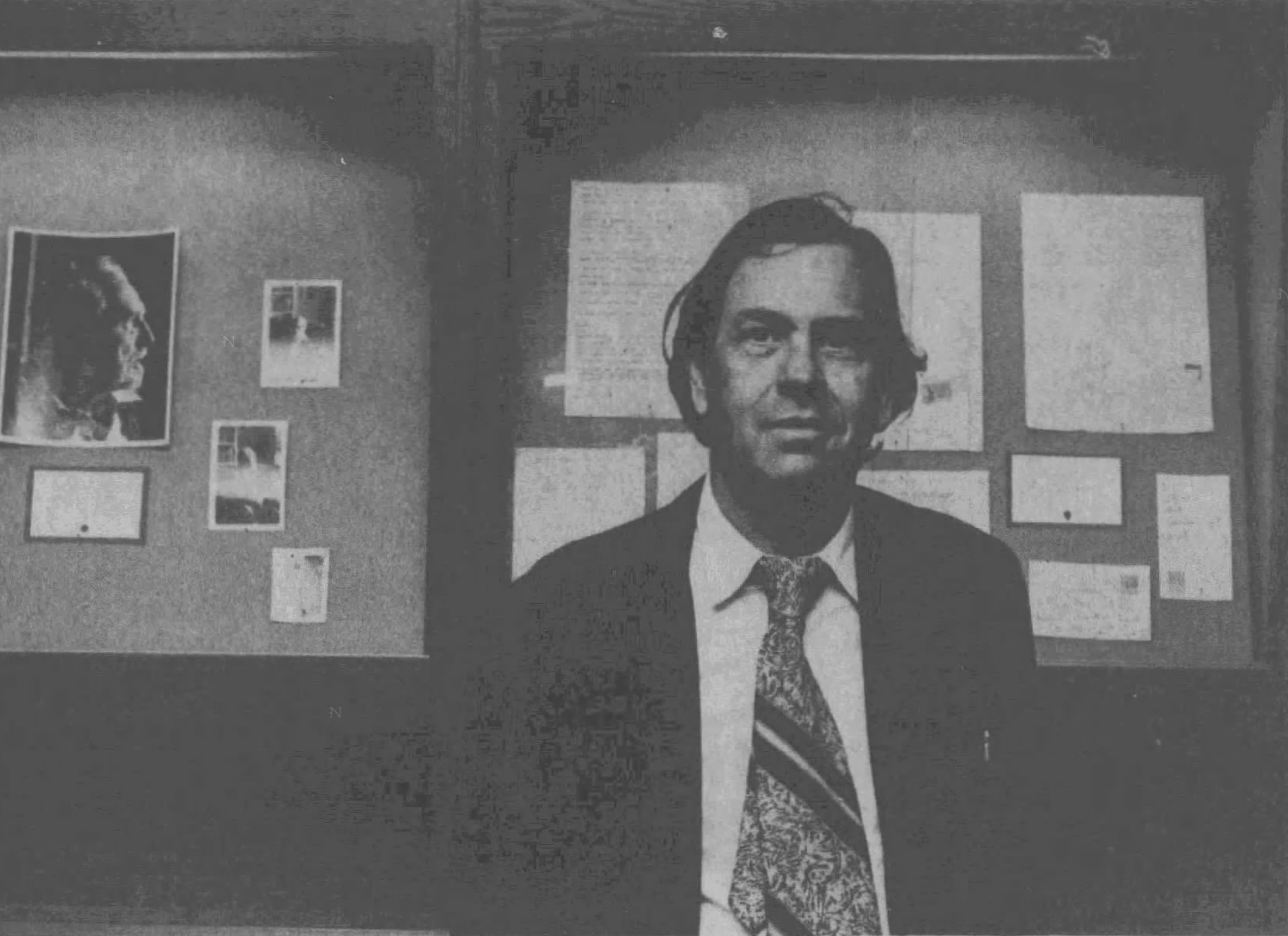
Mullins in 1980 at an exhibit based on his donated Pound materials

Throughout his career, Mullins wrote a variety of articles, pamphlets, and books focused on conspiratorial subject matter, particularly antisemitism, and Holocaust denial. The Southern Poverty Law Center described him as "a one-man organization of hate".

According to Paul F. Boller and John George, Mullins had a "a marked propensity for phony claims and counterfeit creations". Mullins created several notable antisemitic hoaxes: A Racial Program for the Twentieth Century, a nonexistent book purported to be by Israel Cohen, where he supposedly declared a plan for Jewish destruction of the white race, and Our Race Will Rule Undisputed Over The World, a purported speech by a nonexistent rabbi describing a plot for domination of the world. He also created the story of the "Lizzie Stover College Fund"; Lizzie Stover, the hoax went, was President Dwight D. Eisenhower's secret African-American mother.

Boller and George wrote that "Mullins, it is said, has a sense of humor and doesn’t take his own fabrications too seriously." Such hoaxes were widely spread in far-right publications for several decades. A 1968 FBI memo said of his claims that he was a:

depraved, warped degenerate [...] Since it would be inconceivable that any rational person would consider seriously Mullins’ demented allegations and outrageous distortions we have previously considered it unwise to dignify his work with any kind of response.

Chip Berlet and Matthew N. Lyons said of Mullins' writings that "Mullins writes in two styles, one ostensibly focusing on banking practices, the other expressing open and vicious antisemitism." Scholar Martin Durham wrote in 2000 that while "his writings on such topics as 'Jews and Ritual Murder' are unashamedly anti-Semitic, his better-known book on the Federal Reserve is not so easily pigeon-holed."

He self-published some of his books under the imprint "Revelation Books". Michael Barkun described Mullins' 1992 work The World Order: Our Secret Rulers as "a more openly anti-Semitic version of the Illuminati theory". He wrote:

Like his mentor [Ezra Pound], Mullins sees the world's evil as a product of financial manipulation, in which Jews play a central role. But as an explanation of world, as opposed to modern, history, his conspiracist vision makes the Illuminati merely a link in a much longer chain that extends back to the ancient Near East and forward to the nascent communist movement of the early Marx. Weishaupt himself is portrayed as a mere figurehead. ... Mullins sees the Illuminati as really run by Jews.

=== Hitler and the Holocaust ===
Mullins' October 1952 article entitled "Adolf Hitler: An Appreciation" was mentioned in a report by the House Un-American Activities Committee. In it, he espoused antisemitic views and expressed the belief that America owed a debt to Hitler. The article first appeared in National Renaissance Bulletin, journal of the National Renaissance Party.

In a tract from 1984 called The Secret Holocaust, Mullins stated that the accepted account of the Holocaust is implausible, calling it a cover story for Jewish-led Soviet massacres of Christians and anti-communists. In particular, Mullins argues that by the mid-1960s, in order to divert the world's attention away from this putative mass slaughter, "the Jews" had cooked up the story of the Holocaust, using photographs of German victims.

In 1968, Mullins authored the tract The Biological Jew, which he claimed was an objective analysis of the forces behind the "decline" of Western culture. He claimed that the main influence that people were overlooking in their analysis of world affairs was "parasitism".

=== The Secrets of the Federal Reserve ===
His best-known work is The Secrets of The Federal Reserve, in which he alleged that several high-profile bankers had conspired to write the Federal Reserve Act for their own nefarious purposes, and then induced Congress to enact it into law. It became his best known book, and remains broadly influential in American far-right movements.

In his "Foreword" to The Secrets of the Federal Reserve, Mullins explains the circumstances by which he came to write his investigation into the origins of the Federal Reserve System: "In 1949, while I was visiting Ezra Pound… [he] asked me if I had ever heard of the Federal Reserve System. I replied that I had not, as of the age of 25. He then showed me a ten dollar bill marked "Federal Reserve Note" and asked me if I would do some research at the Library of Congress on the Federal Reserve System which had issued this bill." Mullins told Pound that he had little interest in such a research project because he was working on a novel. "My initial research" wrote Mullins, "revealed evidence of an international banking group which had secretly planned the writing of the Federal Reserve Act and Congress’ enactment of the plan into law. These findings confirmed what Pound had long suspected. He said, 'You must work on it as a detective story.'"

Mullins completed the manuscript during the course of 1950 when he began to seek a publisher. Eighteen publishers turned the book down without comment before the President of the Devin-Adair Publishing Company, Devin Garrity, told him, "I like your book but we can't print it ... Neither can anybody else in New York. You may as well forget about getting [it] published." In 1952, the book was finally published by two of Pound's other disciples, John Kasper and David Horton, under the title Mullins on the Federal Reserve.

In it, Mullins postulated a conspiracy among various bankers that led to the founding of the U.S. Federal Reserve System. In an updated edition published in 1983 and retitled Secrets of the Federal Reserve, Mullins expanded on his argument. He called the Rothschilds "world monopolists", and claimed that City of London bankers owned the Federal Reserve, since they owned much of the stock of its member banks. He attempted to trace stock ownership, as it changed hands via mergers and acquisitions, from the inception of the Federal Reserve in 1913 to the early 1980s.

== Death ==
While on a speaking tour in Columbus, Ohio, in January 2010, Mullins suffered a stroke. He died on February 2, 2010, aged 86, in Hockley, Texas.

== Bibliography ==
- —— (1951). His Spirit-Tower. Washington, D.C.: Cleaners Press. OCLC 8444507. Poetry collection.
- —— (1952). A Study of the Federal Reserve. New York: Kasper and Horton. OCLC 3222461. Published in several variant editions with different titles and somewhat differing content.
  - —— (1954). The Federal Reserve Conspiracy. Union: Christian Educational Association. OCLC 3100059.
  - —— (1983). Secrets of the Federal Reserve: The London Connection. Staunton: Bankers Research Institute. OCLC 10596836. Rewritten and expanded edition.
- —— (1961). This Difficult Individual Ezra Pound. New York: Fleet Publishing Corporation. OCLC 288393.
- —— (1968). The Biological Jew. Staunton: Faith and Service Books. OCLC 451364.
- —— (1968). Mullins' New History of the Jews. Staunton: The International Institute of Jewish Studies. OCLC 451365.
  - —— (1978). Mullins' New History of the Jews. Staunton: The International Institute of Jewish Studies. OCLC 182986568.
- —— (1968). My Life in Christ. Staunton: Faith and Service Books. OCLC 443830.
- Cincinnatus (1984). War! War! War!. Introduction by Eustace Mullins (3rd ed.). Metairie: Sons of Liberty. OCLC 19337150.
  - Cincinnatus (1991). War! War! War!. Introduction by Eustace Mullins (4th ed.). Metairie: Sons of Liberty. ISBN 0-89562-100-2. OCLC 38539477.
- Reilly, Lawrence (1985). The Sedition Case. Introduction by Eustace Mullins (3rd ed.). Metairie: Sons of Liberty. OCLC 19337326.
- —— (1984). The Secret Holocaust. Metairie: Sons of Liberty. OCLC 43527493.
- —— (1985). A Writ for Martyrs. Staunton: O.T.U. Christ Church. OCLC 13697939.
- —— (1985). The World Order: A Study in the Hegemony of Parasitism. Staunton: Ezra Pound Institute of Civilization. OCLC 12695489.
  - —— (1992). The World Order: Our Secret Rulers (2nd ed.). Staunton: Ezra Pound Institute of Civilization. OCLC 25624928.
- —— (1987). The Curse of Canaan: A Demonology of History. Staunton: Revelation Books. OCLC 24937265.
- —— (1988). Murder by Injection: The Medical Conspiracy Against America. Staunton: National Council for Medical Research. OCLC 19416618.
- —— (1989). The Rape of Justice: America's Tribunals Exposed. Staunton: National Commission for Judicial Reform. OCLC 21161959.
- —— (1990). Who Owns the TV Networks?. Boring: CPA Book Publisher. OCLC 1552584638.
