= Israel Cohen (Zionist) =

Anglo-Jewish Zionist leader (1879–1961)

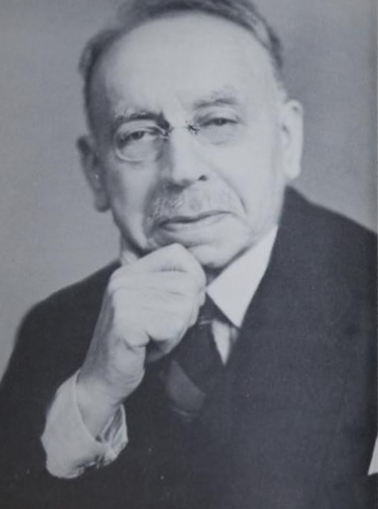
Israel Cohen

Israel Cohen (1879 – 26 November 1961) was an Anglo-Jewish Zionist leader, writer and journalist who served as secretary of the World Zionist Organization.

== Early life ==
Born to Polish Jewish immigrants in Manchester, England in 1879, Israel Cohen was educated at Manchester's Jews' School (1884–1892), Manchester Grammar School (1892–1895); and then simultaneously at Jews' College and University College, London, where he received his BA. From 1895 on, Cohen became actively involved in the Zionist cause.

Upon reading an article in The Jewish Chronicle about pogroms in Russia in 1891, Cohen became interested in Jewish affairs and political matters. Following a speech given by Theodor Herzl, he was further inspired to join the ranks of the Zionist movement in 1896 and became a lifelong supporter of the Zionist movement upon the establishment of the World Zionist Organization at the First Zionist Congress in Basel in August 1897.

Cohen wrote prolifically on the subjects of Zionism, anti-Semitism, and other areas of Jewish concern. His first publication was an article that appeared in the Manchester Evening Chronicle in September 1897. This was followed by a short sketch that appeared in January 1898 in the Jewish World. He subsequently wrote hundreds of newspaper articles and pamphlets for both Jewish and non-Jewish publications alike.

== Later life ==
From 1909 to the beginning of the Second World War, Cohen directed the English department of the Zionist Central Office in Cologne and later in Berlin. During the First World War he was held in Ruhleben internment camp for sixteen months from November 1914. He described these experiences in Ruhleben Prison Camp: A Record of Nineteen Months' Internment, which was published in 1917.

In 1918, Cohen became secretary for the World Zionist Organization in London. During the years 1918–1921 he carried out a number of important diplomatic and fund-raising missions on behalf of the Zionist leadership. These took him to Poland and Hungary, where he investigated and reported on the pogroms and other anti-Jewish acts of violence; and to Jewish communities in Australia, Hong Kong, India, China, and Japan. In Harbin, China, Cohen sought aid for the Palestine Restoration Fund, whose goal it was to purchase Palestine from Turkey. Cohen later described his encounters in The Journey of a Jewish Traveller (1925), and A Jewish Pilgrimage: The Autobiography of Israel Cohen (1956).

Following the Zionist Congress of 1921, which took place in Carlsbad, Cohen was appointed general secretary of the Zionist organization in London, a position he held until 1939. He was also a member of the Board of Deputies of British Jews, and in 1946 he was appointed head of its Foreign Affairs Committee delegation to the peace conference in Paris.

When working in Germany, Cohen became the Berlin correspondent for The Times and The Manchester Guardian, and continued to represent the latter at every Zionist Congress up until 1946.

Israel Cohen died in London on 26 November 1961.

== Works ==
- 1900? – "Historical syllabus from 1700 C.E. to the present day: a course of thirteen readings" [S.l.: s.n.
- 1909 – Israel in Italien
- 1909 – "Zionism & Jewish ideals: a reply to Mr. Laurie Magnus" London: English Zionist Federation
- 1911 – Zionist Work in Palestine (editor) London: Pub. on behalf of the Zionist Central Office by T. F. Unwin
- 1912 – Zionist Work in Palestine (editor) New York, Judaean publishing company
- 1912 – The Zionist Movement: Its Aims and Achievements London: Published on behalf of the Zionist Central Office, Berlin, by W. Speaight
- 1914 – Jewish Life in Modern Times London: Methuen and co. ltd.
- 1917 – The Ruhleben Prison Camp: A Record of Nineteen Months' Internment London, Methuen & co. ltd.
- 1918 – The German Attack on the Hebrew Schools in Palestine London: Offices of the Jewish Chronicle and the Jewish World
- 1918 – Anti-Semitism in Germany London: Offices of the Jewish Chronicle and the Jewish World
- 1919 – A Report on the Pogroms in Poland [London]: Central office of the Zionist organisation
- 1925 – Jewish Life in Modern Times New York, Dodd, Mead and Company
- 1925 – The Journal of a Jewish Traveler Plymouth, Great Britain: The Mayflower Press – William Brendon & Son, Ltd
- 1931 – A Ghetto Gallery
- 1942 – Britain's Nameless Ally
- 1943 – History of the Jews of Vilna
- 1943 – The Jews in the War
- 1946 – The Zionist movement. Edited and rev. with supplementary chapter on Zionism in the United States (editor) New York, Zionist Organization of America
- 1947 – The Progress of Zionism
- 1959 – Theodor Herzl, Founder of Political Zionism New York,: T. Yoseloff

== Hoax quotation ==
Cohen was the subject of an antisemitic hoax amidst debate on the Civil Rights Act of 1957, when Rep. Thomas Abernethy of Mississippi referred to a false quotation attributed to Cohen from a non-existent book, A Racial Program for the Twentieth Century. Abernethy had found the quotation in a March 20, 1957 letter to the editor of The Washington Star and claimed it as proof that the civil rights movement was a foreign communist plot; The Washington Star later apologized for printing the unverified quotation. The quote was identified as a deliberate hoax by antisemitic writer Eustace Mullins.
