= Michael Collins Piper =

American political writer, conspiracy theorist, radio host (1960–2015)

- Piper during an TV interview with C-SPAN, October 6, 1987
- Born: Michael Bernard Piper; July 16, 1960
- Died: May 2015 (aged 54); Coeur d'Alene, Idaho, U.S.
- Occupations: Author, internet radio host

Michael Collins Piper (born Michael Bernard Piper; July 16, 1960 – May 2015) was an American political writer, conspiracy theorist and talk radio host who was described himself on his website as a political "progressive in the La Follette-Wheeler tradition."

Piper was a regular contributor to both The Spotlight and its successor, the American Free Press, newspapers backed by Willis Carto and noted for their antisemitic and White separatist/White nationalist themes.

He wrote books such as The High Priests of War, in which he criticized the neoconservatives in the Bush administration, and Final Judgment, where he claimed that Israel's Mossad, the CIA and organized crime was responsible for the assassination of U.S. President John F. Kennedy. He had been criticized by many organizations, including the Anti-Defamation League, the Simon Wiesenthal Center, and the Middle East Media Research Institute, which have described Piper as a promoter of antisemitic conspiracy theories and Holocaust denial.

== Early life ==
Piper claimed his political engagement was inspired by his older brother's experience in the Vietnam War. He once said his late brother "never completely recovered from the physical and psychological impact of the war."

== Radio show ==
In February 2006, he started a radio show called The Piper Report. Regular guests have included Mark Glenn (critic of Israel), former candidate for Texas state legislature Barbara Samuelson, and Christopher Bollyn (who occasionally filled in for Piper).

Piper commented about the war on Lebanon, the Mel Gibson affair (in which he derided Gibson for driving under the influence and for apologizing for his statements) and the battle between U.S. Senator Joe Lieberman (D-CT, later I-CT) and businessman Ned Lamont on August 8, 2006. Lamont defeated Lieberman in the Democratic primary, but lost to him in the general election. Piper defended alternative medicine, animal rights, and the past activities of Liberty Lobby and Willis Carto. He was featured as a guest on James Edwards' radio show, The Political Cesspool, which has also been accused of promoting antisemitism.

== Kennedy and King assassination theories ==
According to Piper in Final Judgment: The Missing Link in the JFK Assassination Controversy, Israeli Prime Minister David Ben-Gurion orchestrated the assassination after learning that Kennedy planned to keep Israel from obtaining nuclear weapons.

Piper claimed the assassination "was a joint enterprise conducted on the highest levels of the CIA, in collaboration with organized crime — and most specifically, with direct and profound involvement by the Israeli intelligence service, the Mossad." Piper also alleged that Jewish mobster Meyer Lansky and the Anti-Defamation League (ADL) were linked to the murder. The ADL responded with harsh criticisms, called the claims ridiculous, and denounced Final Judgment as antisemitic.

Piper wrote articles in American Free Press which alleged that the Mossad and the FBI conspired to set up the assassination of Martin Luther King Jr. Piper claims this was motivated by fear of King's anti-Israel statements combined with his massive grassroots power.

== Antisemitism controversy ==
According to his biography by America First Books, which identifies itself as promoting "white nationalism", the ADL repeatedly challenged statements made by Piper, and called him a promoter of antisemitic conspiracy theories, a Holocaust denier, and a defender of the Protocols of the Elders of Zion. The group says Piper traveled to the United Arab Emirates in 2003 to lecture on anti-Israeli and antisemitic themes. In one instance, the ADL stated that Piper had suggested that Israel was working on an "ethnic bomb" targeting only Arabs.

Piper responded to increasing ADL criticism through his 2006 book The Judas Goat, accusing the ADL of using unethical infiltration and information gathering techniques, such as the use of 'agents provocateurs'. some years later. Writing in Asia Times, researcher and journalist Keith Bettinger says that Piper's views are "characteristic of an effort by anti-Semites and white supremacists to repackage themselves as 'alternative media voices' claiming to tackle stories the mainstream media in the US won't touch".

== Iran ==
Piper was invited to Iran to speak at the International Conference On Review of the Holocaust: Global Vision 2006, and personally met with Iranian president Mahmoud Ahmadinejad, a Holocaust denier, during his New York City visit to address United Nations General Assembly. His book The New Jerusalem: Zionist Power in America, was on sale at the conference. According to George Michael, Talebzadeh introduced his personal friend Michael Collins Piper to Iranian President Mahmoud Ahmadinejad and the two met on the sidelines of a press conference in the New York City after the latter's speech at the United Nations.[15] Piper was then invited to Iran by Ahmadinejad and participated in International Conference to Review the Global Vision of the Holocaust in 2006.[15] (Nader Talebzadeh (Persian: نادر طالب‌زاده), also known as Nader Ordoubadi, was an Iranian conservative journalist and filmmaker.[2])

== Death ==
Piper's body was discovered on May 30 or May 31, 2015 at the Budget Saver Motel in Coeur d'Alene, Idaho. The deputy coroner's report stated that the cause of death was a "probable Myocardial Infarction, Ischemic Cardiomyopathy and Coronary Artery Disease", and listed diabetes as another significant condition. The report indicated that toxicology results were consistent with her findings and that no autopsy was conducted. The article gave Piper's age as 54.

== Books ==
- Best Witness: The Mel Mermelstein Affair (1993). Washington, D.C.: Center for Historical Review. ISBN 978-0935036480.
- Final Judgment: The Missing Link in the JFK Assassination Conspiracy (1993). Washington, D.C.: The Wolfe Press. ISBN 978-0935036473.
- The High Priests of War (2004). American Free Press. ISBN 978-0974548418.
- The New Jerusalem: Zionist Power in America (2004). American Free Press. ASIN B000Y93216.
- Target: Traficant, The Untold Story (2005). American Free Press. ISBN 978-0981808611.
- The Confessions of an Anti-Semite: The First-Ever Critical Analysis of the Linguistic Legerdemain Underlying the Propaganda Techniques of the New World. ISBN 978-0977326891.
- The Judas Goats: The Enemy Within (2006). American Free Press. ISBN 978-0981808628.
- The Golem: a World Held Hostage (2007). American Free Press. ASIN B0011DZG2W.
- The New Babylon: Those Who Reign Supreme (2009). American Free Press. ISBN 978-0982344811.
- Ye Shall Know The Truth (2013). American Free Press. ISBN 978-1937787899.

=== Contributions ===
- "Publisher's Preface to the 1993 Wright Patman Centennial Edition of A Primer on Money." In: A Primer on Money and Money Facts: 169 Questions & Answers on Money. Washington D.C.: Populist Action Committee (1993). Reprint. ISBN 0-935036-45-8.
