= George Michael (academic) =

American academic (born 1961)

- Born: George Joseph Michael; January 30, 1961 (age 65); United States
- Occupations: Historian, professor, writer

Academic background
- Education: Widener University (BS); Temple University (MA); George Mason University (PhD)

Academic work
- Discipline: Political scientist
- Institutions: Westfield State University
- Notable works: The Enemy of My Enemy, Theology of Hate

George Joseph Michael (born January 30, 1961) is an American historian, political scientist, and writer. He is a professor of criminal justice at Westfield State University in Massachusetts, and previously was associate professor of nuclear counterproliferation and deterrence theory at the Air War College and as associate professor of political science and administration of justice at University of Virginia's College at Wise. He studies right-wing extremism, including the relationship between militant Islam and the far-right.

He is the author of several books, including Confronting Right-Wing Extremism and Terrorism in the USA (2003), The Enemy of My Enemy (2006), Willis Carto and the American Far Right (2008), Theology of Hate: A History of the World Church of the Creator (2009), Lone Wolf Terror and the Rise of Leaderless Resistance (2012), and is the editor of the book Extremism in America (2014).

== Early life and education ==
George Joseph Michael was born on January 30, 1961. He has a B.S. from Widener University and an M.A. from Temple University. He obtained his Ph.D. in public policy from George Mason University in 2002, where he studied under Francis Fukuyama, with a thesis entitled "The U.S. Response to Domestic Right Wing Terrorism and Extremism: A Government and NGO Partnership." His thesis, which discusses terrorism and towards its end discusses Osama bin Laden was, coincidentally, delivered on September 10, 2001, the day before the 9/11 attacks.

== Career ==
Michael is a veteran of the U.S. Air Force and the Pennsylvania Air National Guard from 1985 to 1990. As a civilian, he conducted operations research for the U.S. Army. Starting in 2003, he was an associate professor of the University of Virginia's College at Wise, where he taught political science and administration of justice. He went on to be an associate professor of nuclear counterproliferation and deterrence theory at the Air War College. He joined the faculty of Westfield State University in Massachusetts in 2013, where he is professor of criminal justice.

Described by The Christian Science Monitor as an expert on political extremism, he was awarded the University of Virginia's "Outstanding Research Award", awarded to a faculty member who "has contributed significantly to published research in his or her discipline".

== Works and views ==
Michael studies right-wing extremism, including the relationship between militant Islam and the far-right. In 2003, he authored Confronting Right-wing Extremism and Terrorism in the USA, which discussed domestic terrorists and the threats which they pose to the U.S. "homeland security". His 2006 book The Enemy of My Enemy focuses on connections between far-right and Islamic extremists.

In 2008, he published Willis Carto and the American Far Right, about Willis Carto, founder of the Liberty Lobby. The next year, he authored Theology of Hate: A History of the World Church of the Creator, about Ben Klassen and the World Church of the Creator. In 2012, his book Lone Wolf Terror and the Rise of Leaderless Resistance was published by Vanderbilt University Press. Michael has also published research on SETI (Search for Extraterrestrial Intelligence) and is the author of Preparing for Contact: When Humans and Extraterrestrials Finally Meet (2014). The same year, he edited the collection Extremism in America for the University Press of Florida.

In 2010, Michael said that post-9/11, underground radio stations that traffic in conspiracy theories and incite violence in the U.S. are under greater scrutiny because law enforcement has been given more power to prosecute such speech. He also says that the American Free Press newspaper is "the most important newspaper of the radical right." He notes that: "Traditionally, critique of the IRS has come from the right, such as the Christian Patriot movement, but sovereign citizen movements also invoke a lot of left-wing ideas like anti-capitalism that are consistent with the times and the downturn in the economy, where people may have property liens against them."

== Bibliography ==
- —— (2003). Confronting Right-Wing Extremism and Terrorism in the USA. New York: Routledge. ISBN 0-415-31500-X.
- —— (2006). The Enemy of My Enemy: The Alarming Convergence of Militant Islam and the Extreme Right. Lawrence: University Press of Kansas. ISBN 0-7006-1444-3.
- —— (2008). Willis Carto and the American Far Right. Gainesville: University Press of Florida. ISBN 978-0-8130-3198-9.
- —— (2009). Theology of Hate: A History of the World Church of the Creator. Gainesville: University Press of Florida. ISBN 0-8130-3350-0.
- —— (2012). Lone Wolf Terror and the Rise of Leaderless Resistance. Nashville: Vanderbilt University Press. ISBN 978-0-8265-1855-2.
- ——, ed. (2014). Extremism in America. Gainesville: University Press of Florida. ISBN 978-0-8130-6198-6.
- —— (2014). Preparing for Contact: When Humans and Extraterrestrials Finally Meet. New York: RVP Press. ISBN 978-1-61861-322-6.
