= American Free Press =

American weekly newspaper

- First page of an August 2026 issue
- Type: Weekly newspaper
- Founder: Willis Carto
- Founded: August 2001
- Political alignment: Far-right
- Language: English
- Country: United States
- ISSN: 1539-7416
- OCLC number: 47864077
- Website: americanfreepress.net

The American Free Press is a far-right weekly newspaper published in the United States. Established in August 2001, the newspaper is the successor of The Spotlight, which ceased publication in July when its parent organization, Liberty Lobby, was forced into bankruptcy. American Free Press was founded a month later. It is similar to its predecessor in terms of content.

The paper was founded by the far-right activist Willis Carto and former staffers of The Spotlight. Carto was known for his far-right ideology and involvement with antisemitic and white supremacist organizations. American Free Press was one of many periodicals Carto had a hand in creating. The paper is far-right in orientation, and has been described by media outlets and scholars as antisemitic and conspiratorial.

== Background ==
American Free Press was founded by the American far-right activist Willis Carto. Carto was known for his far-right ideologies and his involvement with a number of white supremacist and antisemitic movements. It was one of numerous far-right periodicals Carto had a hand in creating throughout his career. Carto was the founder of the far-right lobby group the Liberty Lobby, and also created the Holocaust denial magazine The Barnes Review.

The newspaper's predecessor was The Spotlight, which ceased publication July 2, 2001 when Liberty Lobby, its parent organization, went bankrupt as the result of a lawsuit with the Holocaust denial organization the Institute for Historical Review (itself formerly operated by Carto); court decisions would have resulted in him losing control of the periodical. A month later in August 2001, American Free Press was founded by Carto and several former Spotlight staffers in nearly identical form barring the name change.

== Organization ==
The paper is operated with a readership council structure. As of 2008, Christopher J. Petherick was the paper's managing editor.

As of 2008, it had a circulation of about 40,000.

=== Contributors ===
Staff writers for the paper have included far-right writer Michael Collins Piper, Chris Bollyn, Jim Tucker, and Gordon Thomas (from 2003 to 2004). Piper and the conspiracist writer Eustace Mullins were on the editorial staff. Other contributing writers included radio host Dale Crowley and their South American bureau columnist Gonzalo Baeza.

Bollyn came to primarily focus on 9/11 conspiracism in his articles. Bollyn was eventually dismissed from the paper in 2006, following what scholar George Michael described as a "bizarre incident" where Bollyn was arrested at his home for unclear reasons; Bollyn claimed it was the result of articles he wrote in the paper. While the paper initially took his side, Bollyn then claimed American Free Press had been infiltrated by "Zionists", resulting in his dismissal.

== Content ==
=== Ideology ===
Far-right in orientation, the paper's content has been described by media outlets and scholars as antisemitic and conspiratorial. In terms of content the paper is basically identically to its predecessor, The Spotlight. The Anti-Defamation League described it as "a rejiggered version" of The Spotlight, while scholar George Michael said it was a reconstitution of the older paper and "identical in all but name". The paper's first editorial stated:

We choose life and that is why we've prepared this first issue of American Free Press, brought to you by the former staff of The Spotlight, who are now the publishers. We will bring you another issue every week. And this is exactly what each of us must do -- chose a life of liberty under law and the Constitution -- not slavery and death in the New World Order that is being prepared for us all.

As with the Liberty Lobby and its predecessor, The Spotlight, the paper denies it is antisemitic and maintains it is merely anti-Israel. Its contents in the 2000s frequently focused on the Israel-Palestine conflict, primarily sympathetic to the Palestinians. While it claims there is a conspiracy controlling America, it claims the plot is not controlled by Jews, but by the Bilderberg Group, an economic forum.

English journalist David Aaronovitch said that though the paper "tended to be somewhat circumspect about its attitude toward Jews", its consistent focus on "Israeli perfidy, Israeli spies, Israeli brutality, and 'Zionist' financial and political influence suggests that this may have been more a matter of marketing". The paper has been sympathetic to members of the Holocaust denial movement; when British author Holocaust denier David Irving was arrested in 2005, this was a focus of the paper. It has issued some articles sympathetic towards Orthodox Jews who were anti-Israel on the basis of religion. It devoted a lengthy review to the white supremacist David Duke's book Jewish Supremacism.

=== Specific issues ===
The Southern Poverty Law Center wrote that it "carries stories on Zionism, secret 'New World Order' conspiracies, American Jews and Israel". Various articles in the paper espoused a conspiratorial line on the September 11 attacks, especially in accusing Israel of being responsible for the attacks; an article written shortly after the attacks by Piper suggested as much, with articles discussing several conspiracies involving Mossad. It has claimed that perpetrators of both Islamist and far-right terrorist attacks were framed by Israel or federal authorities. The American Free Press also reprinted a speech by Osama bin Laden, introducing him as "one of the most influential men on the planet". In 2005, the newspaper released a compilation of its articles on the subject, entitled Debunking 9/11.

Unlike much of the far right, the American Free Press has at times been at odds with the Christian right and has frequently been critical of Christian evangelicals on the grounds that they are pro-Israel and display "literalist zealotry". Dale Crowley, a Christian evangelist who was against Zionism, wrote for the periodical. More fringe interpretations of Christianity were welcomed by Carto and the periodical. It has advertised for Christian Identity organizations (a white supremacist interpretation of Christianity), like Pete Peters's organization Scriptures for America.

Both it and its predecessor frequently carry articles claiming a future economic disaster, and in the 2000s, criticizing the outsourcing of jobs from America became a main focus. It carried an editorial from the left-wing Vermont politician Bernie Sanders that was critical of job outsourcing; the paper praised him as a "left-wing populist". American Free Press also praised Green Party candidate Ralph Nader, carrying an article written by him.

American Free Press was frequently critical of the War on Terror and following conflicts; it critiqued the Iraq War as "wrong", "needless", and "a bloodbath that will have grievous consequences for years to come", and also claimed it has been masterminded by "neoconservative Jewish elements that dictate the Bush administration"; in 2006, the paper criticized possible military attack against Iran. It called the trial of Saddam Hussein a "sham". The story of the Abu Ghraib torture and prisoner abuse scandal was reported by Gordon Thomas in American Free Press several months before it made the mainstream news.

It is frequently critical of immigration, primarily for racial reasons. It has praised South American populist leaders, particularly Venezuelan president Hugo Chávez. Editorials in the paper decried the American economic involvement of the United States in South American and the United States's historical role in regime change.

== Response and influence ==
Scholar George Michael noted the paper in 2006 as then "possibly the most circulated organ of the extreme right". The ADL described it as being "a leading source on the far-right for disseminating anti-Semitic propaganda"

The Southern Poverty Law Center considers the publication to be a hate group.
