= A Racial Program for the Twentieth Century =

Antisemitic hoax

A Racial Program for the Twentieth Century (occasionally Social Problems for the Twentieth Century or A Radical Program for the Twentieth Century) was the purported book title of a 1950s hoax (also called the Israel Cohen hoax) purporting a foreign communist plot to increase racial tensions in the United States. The hoax gained public notoriety when a congressman read a supposed quotation from the book to argue against the Civil Rights Act of 1957. The phony quotation was later traced to the antisemite Eustace Mullins.

== Origins ==
The quote appeared in the July 1, 1954 issue of the antisemitic paper Common Sense, in an article by Eustace Mullins entitled "Jewish Marxists Threaten Negro Revolt In America! Communists Plan Black Republic In South". Mullins had been fired some years before for antisemitism from a probationary job as a photographic aide at the Library of Congress. Other counterfeits were attributed to Mullins. In this article, Mullins wrote:

The Jewish Communist Israel Cohen in 1912 wrote a "A Racial Program for the Twentieth Century", in which he declared:
"We must realize that our Party’s most powerful weapon is racial tension. By pounding into the consciousness of the dark races that for centuries they have been oppressed by the whites, we can mold them to the program of the Communist Party. The terms colonialism and imperialism must be featured in our propaganda. In America, we will aim for a subtle victory. While inflaming the Negro minority against the whites, we will endeavour to instill in the whites a guilt complex for their exploitation of the Negroes. We will aid the Negroes to rise to prominence in every walk of life, in the professions and, in the world of sports and entertainment. With this prestige, the Negroes will be able to inter-marry with the whites and begin a process which will deliver America to our cause."

In the next few years, the quote appeared in various newspapers as a letter to the editor, including The Richmond News Leader in 1955, the Fort Worth Star-Telegram in 1956, and the The Washington Star on March 20, 1957. The quote was also included in a 1955 article in The Fort Mill Times, a 1956 advertisement in the right-wing paper The Virginian, and mentioned in an article in The News & Observer in 1956.

== Congressional Record quotation and aftermath ==
On June 7, 1957, during a debate on the Civil Rights Act of 1957, Rep. Thomas Abernethy of Mississippi read into the Congressional Record a quotation from the nonexistent book, which was attributed to Israel Cohen in 1912. This version said: "We must realize that our party's most powerful weapon is racial tensions. By propounding into the consciousness of the dark races that for centuries they have been oppressed by whites, we can mold them to the program of the Communist Party. In America we will aim for subtle victory. While inflaming the Negro minority against the whites, we will endeavor to instill in the whites a guilt complex for their exploitation of the Negroes. We will aid the Negroes to rise in prominence in every walk of life, in the professions and in the world of sports and entertainment. With this prestige, the Negro will be able to intermarry with the whites and begin a process which will deliver America to our cause."

Abernethy had found the quotation in the March 20, 1957, letter to the editor of The Washington Star; he claimed it as proof that the civil rights movement was a foreign communist plot. However, The Washington Star soon apologized for having printed the quotation without verifying its authenticity and, on February 18, 1958, published an article entitled "Story of a Phony Quotation—A Futile Effort to Pin It Down—'A Racial Program for the 20th Century' Seems to Exist Only in Somebody's Imagination". They traced the same letter to The Virginian; the editor of the Virginian had previously attempted to trace the quotation himself, concluding that it was a hoax that had first appeared in a "small rightist paper" in an article by Eustace Mullins. Mullins claimed to have found it in a Zionist publication in the Library of Congress.

On August 30 of that year, Rep. Abraham J. Multer of New York read the Star article into the Congressional Record and raised several other points challenging the quotation's authenticity. These included the nonexistence of a British Communist party in 1912 (it was founded in 1920) and the nonexistence of a British Communist author named Israel Cohen. Although a British Jewish author and Zionist named Israel Cohen did exist in that period, he had no affiliation with Communism nor is there any record of him writing such a work. A Racial Program does not exist either in the Library of Congress or in the British Museum Catalogue of Printed Books. Cohen, contacted by the Star, denied having ever written such a work.

After the Abernethy quotation, and despite being revealed as a hoax, the quote continued to spread through far-right publications and outlets; frequently, such publications quoted it as from the Congressional Record, without further context. The right-wing magazine South quoted Abertnethy's reading in an October 21, 1957 editorial, and the Citizens' Council of America quoted it in their newsletter in September of that year, quoting it again in a radio broadcast on January 19, 1958. In 1963, the far-right Dan Smoot Report quoted it on July 22, 1963, though after Dan Smoot was contacted by the communist Morris Kominsky with the news of it being a hoax, later declared he could not authenticate the quote. In October of the same year, the John Birch Society outlet American Opinion quoted it in an article by their film critic, Jack Moffitt, though did not describe Cohen as a communist; the magazine received a letter declaring the quote a hoax, which the magazine conceded. Far-right writer Hal W. Hunt also quoted it in his National Chronicle in March 1965, though changed its title to Social Problems for the Twentieth Century.

== See also ==
- Our Race Will Rule Undisputed Over The World - also a fabricated speech by Eustace Mullins under alias of "Rabbi Emanuel Rabinovich".
- List of hoaxes
- Miscegenation: The Theory of the Blending of the Races, Applied to the American White Man and Negro
