= Ernie Lazar =

American researcher (1945–2022)

- Born: Ernest Clayton Jammes; April 16, 1945; Minneapolis, Minnesota, U.S.
- Died: November 1, 2022 (aged 77); Palm Springs, California, U.S.
- Education: California State University, East Bay
- Years active: 1960s-2020s
- Known for: Ernie Lazar FOIA Collection
- Website: sites.google.com/site/ernie124102/home

Ernie Lazar (born Ernest Clayton Jammes; April 16, 1945 – November 1, 2022) was an American researcher and a prolific Freedom of Information Act petitioner who amassed a "vast digital and documentary archive of government records on political extremists," used by many scholars, who regarded him as a "hero of researchers."

== Background ==
Ernie Lazar was born Ernest Clayton Jammes on April 16, 1945, in Minneapolis, Minnesota, to Marjorie Jammes and an unknown father. His mother allowed the Lazar family to adopt him in Chicago. Lazar majored in history at the California State College at Hayward (now California State University, East Bay) but did not graduate.

== Career ==
As a teenage freelance researcher, he read the monthly FBI Law Enforcement Bulletin. At one point, he read how US Federal Bureau of Investigation director J. Edgar Hoover contradicted a John Birch Society supporter’s letter regarding the Communist Party USA. Hostile responses led to a lifelong interest in right-wing conspiracy theories.

For his day job, Lazar worked in the music industry as record promoter, disc jockey, and record store owner in San Francisco. He helped promote "Born to Be Alive" by Patrick Hernandez in 1979. Later, he worked more than two decades for the State of California's Board of Registered Nursing, Department of Motor Vehicles, and Office of the Secretary of State of California. Lazar received mention in Billboard on June 11, 1977, for his music store "Disco Central" and its unique disco collection in the San Francisco Bay area.

For his night job and over his lifetime, Lazar filed more than 9,000 Freedom of Information Act (FOIA) requests. He amassed a "600,000-page online and paper library — stored at his home and in a warehouse." The Center for Right Wing Studies at the University of California, Berkeley, received a grant from the Southern Poverty Law Center to digitize some files, while Lazar crowdsourced for funding himself.

Less than a year before his death, Lazar wrote to the Las Vegas Sun regarding the FBI and the John Birch Society:

In response to the Nov. 24 editorial, "Right-wing extremism has changed its name but not its goals or tactics":

Even J. Edgar Hoover’s FBI recognized the danger represented by groups like the John Birch Society. In a November 1964 press conference, Hoover declared:
"Personally, I have little respect for the head of the John Birch Society since he linked the names of former President Dwight D. Eisenhower, the late John Foster Dulles, and former CIA Director Allen Dulles with communism."
The official position of the FBI on the society was expressed in two memos circulated among senior FBI employees:

- "The supporters of this organization and those influenced by the vicious propaganda it has been putting out are typical of the fanatics who have been attempting lately to disparage and discredit Bureau speakers who have been giving audiences a true, factual picture concerning the nature of the threat which communist activities in this country represent."
- "The John Birch Society is an extremist organization which was founded by Robert Welch in Indianapolis, Ind., in December 1958. … We certainly should not allow ourselves to be placed in a position where an organization of the character of the JBS can use statements attributed to the Bureau or to the Director to support its position in this or any other matter. This organization would not hesitate to twist any statement by the Bureau to confirm with its extremist position."

In September 2022, Lazar made an unusual public announcement, which included acknowledgement of his nearing death for "renal disease." For reading, he recommended David Corn's American Psychosis: A Historical Investigation of How the Republican Party Went Crazy (2022) and Matt Dallek's BIRCHERS: How the John Birch Society Radicalized the American Right (2023).

== Death ==
Ernie Lazar died from kidney disease at his home in Palm Springs, California, on November 1, 2022. He was 77, and had no immediate family.

== Legacy ==
Before his death, Lazar estimated that more than 3 million people worldwide had mined his various online archives. He inspired many authors, researchers, academics and others to use the Freedom of Information Act as a way to gather material form government sources.

In his 2016 book John Birch: A Life, author Terry Lautz wrote, "Ernie Lazar introduced me to important documents on the John Birch Society... Ernie Lazar has obtained and posted hundreds of Federal Bureau of Investigation (FBI) documents on the JBS (including many newspaper articles) through the Freedom of Information Act."

== External sources ==
- Ernie Lazar FBI files at Internet Archive
- Lazar FOIA collections at Archive.org:
  - Ernie Lazar FOIA collection
  - Ernie Lazar FOIA collection: general files A-Z
  - Ernie Lazar FOIA collection: FBI files
- Guide to the Ernie Lazar FBI FOIA files on anti-communism and right wing movements TAM.576 (NYU Tamiment Library)
- Ernie Lazar FOIA collection (H-Net)
- Ernie's Lazar's extensive bibliography of academic theses and PhD dissertations on the American Right (Berkley Center for Right-Wing Studies)
