= Anderson v. Liberty Lobby, Inc. =

- Supreme Court of the United States

Argued December 3, 1985 Decided June 25, 1986
- Full case name: Jack Anderson, et al. v. Liberty Lobby, Incorporated, et al.
- Citations: 477 U.S. 242 (more) 106 S. Ct. 2505; 91 L. Ed. 2d 202; 1986 U.S. LEXIS 115; 54 U.S.L.W. 4755; 4 Fed. R. Serv. 3d (Callaghan) 1041; 12 Media L. Rep. 2297

Holding
- Summary judgment will not lie if the dispute about a material fact is "genuine," that is, if the evidence is such that a reasonable jury could return a verdict for the nonmoving party.

Court membership
- Chief Justice Warren E. Burger Associate Justices William J. Brennan Jr. · Byron White; Thurgood Marshall · Harry Blackmun; Lewis F. Powell Jr. · William Rehnquist; John P. Stevens · Sandra Day O'Connor

Case opinions
- Majority: White, joined by Marshall, Blackmun, Powell, Stevens, O'Connor
- Dissent: Brennan
- Dissent: Rehnquist, joined by Burger

Laws applied
- Rule 56 of the Federal Rules of Civil Procedure

Anderson v. Liberty Lobby, Inc., 477 U.S. 242 (1986), is a United States Supreme Court case articulating the standard for a trial court to grant summary judgment under the Federal Rules of Civil Procedure. After Anderson, summary judgment shall be granted when, taking all factual inferences in the non-movant's favor, there exists no genuine issue as to a material fact and the movant deserves judgment as a matter of law.

== Background ==
The Investigator, an investigative news magazine, published three articles about Liberty Lobby, calling the organization and its founder Willis Carto antisemitic, racist and Fascist. Liberty Lobby and Carto sued The Investigator and its publisher, journalist Jack Anderson for libel. The defendants moved for summary judgment under the standard set by New York Times Co. v. Sullivan, which requires a plaintiff to prove with clear and convincing evidence that a defamatory statement was made with actual malice. The District Court ruled that The Investigator had duly researched its statements and granted the motion. Summary judgment was reversed on appeal with respect to some of the alleged defamatory statements, with the Court of Appeals stating that evidence need not be clear and convincing for the purpose of summary judgment.

A majority of the Supreme Court held that when a "clear and convincing" standard applies, it applies as well to summary judgment. It vacated the Court of Appeals' ruling and remanded the case for further proceedings. Justices Rehnquist, Burger and (separately) Brennan dissented on the grounds that the Court's reasoning was too abstract to provide the necessary guidance to lower courts.

== See also ==
- Celotex Corp. v. Catrett (1986), another major case on summary judgment under the Federal Rules of Civil Procedure
