= Liberty Lobby =

Former United States political advocacy organization

- Formation: 1950s
- Dissolved: 2001
- Type: Political advocacy organization
- Legal status: Defunct
- Headquarters: Washington, D.C.
- Fields: Political advocacy
- Founder: Willis Carto
- Main organ: Liberty Letter (1961–1975); The Spotlight (1975–2001)

Liberty Lobby was a far-right think tank and lobby group founded in the 1950s by Willis Carto. Carto was known for his promotion of antisemitic conspiracy theories, white nationalism, and Holocaust denial.

The organization produced a daily five-minute radio show called This is Liberty Lobby, which was broadcast on the Mutual Broadcasting System and other radio stations. At the conclusion of each show, listeners were invited to get a copy of its "America First" pamphlet.

== History ==
=== Background ===
In the early 1950s, Willis Carto moved to San Francisco, California, first entering the right-wing political scene in 1952. There, Carto met Willis Stone, a right-wing activist and the founder of the Liberty Amendment Group. Stone introduced Carto to Aldrich Blake, the founder of Liberty and Property, a right-wing political organization. Blake employed Carto to work on several right-wing publications for him. In 1955, Blake, being substantially older than Carto, decided to give over control of Liberty and Property to him. Carto proceeded to incorporate the organization.

The same year, Carto launched the magazine Right, focused on far-right politics. Carto saw Liberty and Property as unsuccessful, and shuttered the organization. It was eventually replaced by the Liberty Lobby, though it is unclear when, exactly, this occurred. The organization was formally incorporated in Washington, D.C. on February 1, 1962, though its own materials variously claim June 5, 1955 or July 17, 1957 as its founding date. The first public declaration of an intent to create the Liberty Lobby came in an August 1957 article in Right magazine.

=== Activities ===
Carto's Noontide Press republished Francis Parker Yockey's Imperium: The Philosophy of History and Politics, and also published a number of other books and pamphlets promoting a racialist and white supremacist world view, and Liberty Lobby in turn sold and promoted these books.

While Liberty Lobby was intended to occupy a niche as a conservative anti-Communist group, Carto was meanwhile forming other organizations which would take a much more explicit neo-Nazi orientation. Among these was the National Youth Alliance in 1968, which in the early 1970s became the National Alliance. Eventually Carto lost control of this organization, which fell into the hands of William Luther Pierce. Carto founded the Institute for Historical Review by 1978, a group known for publishing Holocaust denial books and articles. As with the National Youth Alliance and Noontide Press, the Institute for Historical Review fell out of Carto's hands in a hostile internal struggle. Liberty Lobby, however, remained under the control of Carto until it was disbanded in 2001.

During the 1968 United States presidential election Liberty Lobby distributed a pro-Wallace pamphlet entitled "Stand up for America", despite the campaign's denial of such a connection.

During the 1970s, as the anti-Communism of the 1950s and 1960s fell out of favor, Carto redefined the public image of Liberty Lobby, and began to describe it as a politically populist organization, rather than conservative or right-wing. Liberty Lobby also tried to create connections to the American political left by redistributing a report critical of President Jimmy Carter authored by frequent third-party presidential candidate Lyndon LaRouche and his NCLC. Scholar Daniel Smith writes that between the late 1960s and early 1980s, Liberty Lobby, along with the John Birch Society, institutionalized and became "ideological hubs" of the far-right. The organizations and their publications were influential in shaping the previous anti-internationalism into anti-globalism.

Liberty Lobby was infiltrated by journalist Robert Eringer, who wrote about the organization in Mother Jones in 1981. The organization campaigned against the ratification of the Genocide Convention.

=== Periodicals ===
In the 1960s, the Liberty Lobby launched several periodicals, the most important of which was the Liberty Letter, established in January 1961. In 1966, Carto acquired control of the preexisting magazine The American Mercury. After the Liberty Letter ceased in 1975, the Liberty Lobby replaced it with a new publication, The Spotlight, a newspaper which was published between then and 2001.

The Spotlight ran news and opinion articles with a very populist and anti-establishment slant on a variety of subjects, but gave little indication of being extreme-right or neo-Nazi. However, critics charged The Spotlight was intended as a subtle recruiting tool for the extreme right, using populist-sounding articles to attract people from all points on the political spectrum including liberals, moderates, and conservatives, and special-interest articles to attract people interested in such subjects as alternative medicine. Critics also charged the newspaper with subtly incorporating antisemitic and white racialist undertones in its articles, and with carrying advertisements in the classified section for openly neo-Nazi groups and books. The Washington Post described The Spotlight as "a newspaper containing orthodox conservative political articles interspersed with anti-Zionist tracts and classified advertisements..."

The Spotlight's circulation peaked around 200,000 in the early 1980s, and although it experienced a steady drop after that, it continued to be published until Liberty Lobby's demise in 2001.

Liberty Lobby founded The Barnes Review in 1994.

=== Demise ===
In 2001, Liberty Lobby and Carto lost a civil lawsuit brought by a rival far-right group which had earlier gained control of the Institute for Historical Review, and the ensuing judgment for damages bankrupted the organization. Carto and others who had been involved in publishing The Spotlight have since started a new newspaper, the American Free Press, which is very similar in overall tone to The Spotlight. As of 2014, the political organization called Liberty Lobby remains defunct.

== Views ==
Liberty Lobby described itself as "a pressure group for patriotism; the only lobby in Washington, D.C., registered with Congress which is wholly dedicated to the advancement of government policies based on our Constitution and conservative principles." According to Chip Berlet, Liberty Lobby presented itself as "a patriotic populist organization seeking to restore constitutional safeguards and national sovereignty" and said that it "consistently [denied] that it [was] the least bit antisemitic, much less neofascist or quasinazi".

=== Antisemitism ===
Liberty Lobby described itself as a conservative political organization.

Evidence for the antisemitic stance of Liberty Lobby began to mount when numerous letters by Carto excoriating the Jews (and blaming them for world miseries) began to surface, which included statements such as "How could the West [have] been so blind. It was the Jews and their lies that blinded the West as to what Germany was doing. Hitler's defeat was the defeat of Europe and America." Carto's letters eventually became the subject of a federal civil lawsuit. There were several other defamation lawsuits arising from publications that described Liberty Lobby as anti-semitic or racist, but it appears that Liberty Lobby never won any of these cases.

Other evidence of the group's antisemitic views includes the charge that the group's file cabinets contained extensive pro-Nazi and Ku Klux Klan literature. In 1969, True magazine ran a story by Joe Trento, titled "How Nazi Nut Power Has Invaded Capitol Hill".

=== "Repatriation" of black people ===
Beginning in October 1966 two American journalists, Drew Pearson and Jack Anderson, published a series of stories in their widely-syndicated "Washington Merry-Go-Round" column which recounted the findings of a former employee, Jeremy Horne. Horne said he had discovered a box of correspondence between Carto and numerous government officials establishing the Joint Council of Repatriation (JCR), a forerunner organization to Liberty Lobby. The JCR stated that their fundamental purpose was to "repatriate blacks back to Africa". Ex-Mississippi Supreme Court Justice Thomas Pickens Brady and various members of the White Citizens' Councils who had worked to establish the JCR contributed to the founding of Liberty Lobby. Other correspondence referred to U.S. Congressional support for the emerging Liberty Lobby, such as from South Carolina Senator Strom Thurmond (Dixiecrat presidential candidate in 1948) and California U.S. Representative James B. Utt.

Pearson reported that Utt, as well as congressmen John M. Ashbrook, Ellis Yarnal Berry, W. Pat Jennings and William Jennings Bryan Dorn, received "Statesman of the Republic" awards from Liberty Lobby for their "right-wing activities".

Liberty Lobby sued for libel based on the stories in a case decided in 1986 by the U.S. Supreme Court, Anderson v. Liberty Lobby, Inc. The case was the most quoted Supreme Court precedent in 1997 because it established the guidelines for issuing summary judgment to end frivolous lawsuits.

== See also ==
- Curtis B. Dall (a former chairman of Liberty Lobby)
- Right-wing populism
