= Martin Durham =

British political scientist (1951–2022)

- Durham in 1992
- Born: 4 June 1951; Plymouth, England
- Died: 2022 (aged 70)
- Occupations: Political scientist, author
- Spouse: Stephanie West (m. 1995)
- Children: 2

Academic background
- Education: Birmingham Polytechnic; University of Birmingham (PhD)

Academic work
- Institutions: Coventry University, University of Wolverhampton

Martin Durham (4 June 1951 – 2022) was a British political scientist and author. He was best known for his writings on both the British and American far-right political ecosystems. Durham was a lecturer at Coventry University from 1981 to 1984, going on to become lecturer, then senior lecturer of American studies and politics at the University of Wolverhampton from 1984 until his retirement in 2014. He wrote four monographs on political topics, including Sex and Politics (1991), Women and Fascism (1998), and White Rage (2007).

== Early life and education ==
Durham was born in Plymouth, England on 4 June 1951. His father Russell Durham was a mechanic, while his mother Phyllis (née Ransome) was a librarian. He attended Davenport high school. He was the first person in his family to attend higher education; Durham attended Birmingham Polytechnic, where he studied politics.

While in his final year at Birmingham Polytechnic, Durham was meeting a friend at a pub on 21 November 1974. During his meeting, the Irish Republican Army set off bombs in the tavern. 21 people were killed and over 180 people were injured, including Durham. The explosion sent debris into his face, which severed a nerve and cut part of his ear. The left side of his face was paralyzed in the attack and he was temporarily deafened. His friend was also injured. He had to undergo plastic surgery and was in the hospital for 13 days. He had to spend several months away from classes as a result.

He graduated with second-degree honours in politics from Birmingham Polytechnic in July 1975. He continued his studies at the University of Birmingham, where he received his PhD with a thesis on "Sylvia Pankhurst and Women in the Early Communist Movement".

== Career and works ==
In 1981, Durham became a lecturer at Coventry University. In 1984, he became a lecturer at the University of Wolverhampton. He eventually became senior lecturer of politics and American studies there. He retired from his post in 2014. Durham wrote on political science and was interested in a variety of political topics, especially the far-right, but also the left-wing and feminist history and abortion. Scholar Daniel Jones described him as "a well-known figure in Far Right Studies – in particular for his work on the role of gender within the far right". In one instance, his research got him visited by the police and his room searched. The police ultimately deemed him to not be a threat but rather an "an irrelevant bookworm".

Durham was known for his writings and scholarship on both the British and American far-right political ecosystems. While opposed to far-right political ideology, he aimed to study it dispassionately as a serious ideology and not condemn the subjects of his writings. He wrote four monographs in his career, and several articles. His first book was Sex and Politics: The Family and Morality in the Thatcher Years, which was published in 1991 by Macmillan Education. Sex and Politics took him six years to research.

He followed this up with Women and Fascism in 1998, published by Routledge. In 2000, his book The Christian Right, the Far Right and the Boundaries of American Conservatism was published by Manchester University Press. In 2007, his book White Rage: The Extreme Right and American Politics was published by Routledge.

== Personal life and death ==
Durham met Stephanie West in the 1980s while employed as a lecturer at the University of Wolverhampton. They fell out of contact, but met again in the 1990s, and married in 1995. They had two children.

Durham died in 2022, aged 70.

== Bibliography ==
- —— (1991). Sex and Politics: The Family and Morality in the Thatcher Years. Basingstoke: Macmillan Education. ISBN 0-333-49848-8. Published in the United States the same year as Moral Crusades: Family and Morality in the Thatcher Years by New York University Press.
- —— (1998). Women and Fascism. New York: Routledge. ISBN 0-415-12279-1.
- —— (2000). The Christian Right, the Far Right and the Boundaries of American Conservatism. Manchester University Press. ISBN 0-7190-5485-0.
- —— (2007). White Rage: The Extreme Right and American Politics. New York: Routledge. ISBN 978-1-134-23181-2.
- ——; Power, Margaret, eds. (2010). New Perspectives on the Transnational Right. New York: Palgrave Macmillan. ISBN 978-0-230-62370-5.
