= List of white power music acts =

This is a list of white power music acts, bands or music acts that create music that promotes overt white supremacy. It encompasses various music styles, including rock, country, and folk. There are various genres, including Nazi punk, fascist experimental music, Rock Against Communism, National Socialist black metal, hatecore, and fashwave.

Early white power bands appeared in the 1960s, country acts that employed racist and pro Ku Klux Klan themes, like the American country musician Johnny Rebel. Neo-Nazi bands first appeared in the late 1970s. Punk rock, and genres influenced by it, had used National Socialist imagery for shock value, but those bands were usually not fascist. This changed when Oi!, a genre of punk rock, became popular with white power skinheads. The ambiguity of National Socialist chic can make it difficult to identify a band's intentions, especially when the bands do not express a clear political message. Academics usually identify these bands as neo-Nazi by analyzing their worldview. Scholar Helene Lööw estimated the total amount of bands in 2000 as 200-250.

== List ==
Name	Country	Genre	Notes	References
13 Knots	United States	Rock	The name is derived from the number of coils in a noose. Wade Michael Page, the perpetrator of the 2012 Wisconsin Sikh temple shooting, was a former member of the band.	
ADL 122	Italy	Rock		
Aggravated Assault	United States	Rock		
Aggressive Force	United States	Rock		
Agrese 95	Czech Republic	Rock		
Agressiva 88	Poland		Later renamed Nordica	
Angry Aryans	United States	Hatecore	Found to be one of the most popular bands (no. 14) among readers of the white power music magazine Resistance in a 2009 analysis.	
Angry White Youth	United States	Rock		
Antisemitex	Poland			
Archivum	Hungary	Rock		
Arresting Officers	United States	Rock		
Aryan	Canada	Rock		
Aryan Wind	United States			
Aryan Terrorism	Ukraine	NSBM		
Attack	United States	Rock		
Auf Eigene Gefahr	Germany	Rock	Aka AEG. Based in Chemnitz.	
Baranki Boze	Poland			
Berserkr	United States	Rock	Found to be one of the most popular bands (no. 11) among readers of the white power music magazine Resistance in a 2009 analysis.	
Better Read Than Dead	United States	Rock		
Big Reb	United States	Country		
Block 11	Italy	Rock	Name is a reference to the Auschwitz concentration camp	
Bludgeon	United States	Rock		
Blue Eyed Devils	United States	Hatecore	Founded by former members of Nordic Thunder. Found to be one of the most popular bands (no. 6) among readers of the white power music magazine Resistance in a 2009 analysis.	
Boot Boys	United States	Rock		
Bootleg Bill	United States	Country		
Bound for Attack	United States	Rock		
Bound for Glory	United States	Rock	Established 1989 in St. Paul, Minnesota. Scholar Kirsten Dyck said they were the "most famous white-power band" in the USA and "one of the most important groups the international white-power music scene has ever produced". Found to be one of the most popular bands (no. 2) among readers of the white power music magazine Resistance in a 2009 analysis.	
Braník	Czech Republic		Skinhead band with openly racist lyrics	
The Brawlers	United States	Rock		
Brigade M	Netherlands	Rock		
Brigad Wotan	Sweden			
British Standard	United Kingdom	Rock Against Communism	Based in Glasgow	
Broadsword	Australia	Rock		
Brutal Attack	United Kingdom	Punk rock	Found to be one of the most popular bands (no. 5) among readers of the white power music magazine Resistance in a 2009 analysis.	
Brutal Begude	France	Rock Against Communism / metal	Band from Marseille active from 1995 to 2015.	
Brutal Combat	France	Rock Against Communism	Band from Brest active from 1984 to 1988, managed by Gaël Bodilis, founder of the Rebelles Européens record label.	
BTM	Poland			
Buldok	Czech Republic		First skinhead band in the Czech Republic to be openly neo-Nazi	
Bulldog Skin	Italy		Established in the 1990s, based in Messina	
Bully Boys	United States	Oi!/Punk	Formed in Dallas, Texas in 1983. Found to be one of the most popular bands (no. 7) among readers of the white power music magazine Resistance in a 2009 analysis.	
Bunker 84	France	Rock Against Communism	Based in Méru, Oise; active from 1984 to 1989. They released the album Notre combat. The band reformed in 2018 to play live shows.	
Carl Klang	United States	Country		
Celtic Warrior	Wales		Based in Cardiff	
Cenotaph	United States	Rock		
Centurion	United States	Metal	1990s metal band. Their lead singer was Arno Michaelis, who later denounced the white supremacist movement. Found to be one of the most popular bands (no. 10) among readers of the white power music magazine Resistance in a 2009 analysis.	
Chaos 88	United States	Rock		
Children of the Reich	United States			
C.I.S.	United States	Rock	Short for Christian Identity Skins	
Code 13	United States	Rock		
Col. Sharecropper	United States	Country		
Confederate Storm	United States	Rock		
Corona Ferrea	Italy		Name means Iron Crown	
Crew X	United States	Rock		
The Crusaders	United States	Country		
Cybernazi	N/A	Fashwave		
Das Reich	United States	Rock		
Day of the Sword	United States	Rock	Skinhead band	
Definite Hate	United States	Rock	Wade Michael Page was a former member of the band.	
Dirlewanger/Heroes	Sweden			
Dirty White Punks	United States	Rock		
Dissident	Australia	Rock		
Division S	Sweden			
Dying Breed	United States	Rock		
Ekspanja	Poland		Established in the mid-1990s	
Elite Terror	United States	Rock		
End Apathy	United States		Wade Michael Page was the founder of the band.	
Endstufe	Germany	Rock		
English Rose	United Kingdom		Based in Leicester	
Eric Owens	United States	Folk		
Ethnic Cleansing	United States	Hatecore	Operated from 1995 to 2005, led by the pseudonymous Stooley Carmichael. Regarded as uniquely extreme even among other neo-Nazis. Released two albums called Piles of Dead Jews and Hitler was Right, then a compilation album entitled Hail AIDS. James Mason, the author of Siege, was featured on the album with an introductory monologue.	
Evil Skins	France	Rock Against Communism	Based in Paris, active from 1983 to 1987. They released the EP Docteur Skinhead followed by the album Une force, une cause, un combat. The band is said to have been the first on the French RAC scene to use the phrase "Sieg Heil" in a song.	
Excalibur	Czech Republic			
Extreme Hatred	United States	Rock		
Feniks	Poland		Established in the mid-1990s	
Final Solution	Italy		Established in the 1990s, based in Messina	
Final Solution	United States	Rock		
Final War	United States	Rock	Based in Orange County, California.	
Force Fed Hate	United States			
Fraction	France	Hatecore/Oi!	Previously Fraction Hexagone.	
Frakass	France	Rock Against Communism	Lyon-based group active from 1986 to 2020.	
Freikorps	France			
Frontline Fighters	Australia	Rock		
Fueled by Hate	United States			
Fürher	United States	Rock		
Fortress	Australia	Rock	Led by their vocalist, Scott McGuiness. Scholar Kirsten Dyck noted them as especially extremist relative to other Australian white power bands. Found to be one of the most popular bands (no. 9) among readers of the white power music magazine Resistance in a 2009 analysis.	
Frank Rennicke	Germany	Folk		
Gammadion	Poland			
Gesta Bellica	Italy		According to scholar Kirsten Dyck, probably the best known Italian white power band. Established in 1990 in Verona.	
Gestapo SS	United States			
Głos Prawdy	Poland			
Grinded Nig	United States	Hatecore	Based in Texas	
H8 Campaign	United States	Rock		
H8Machine	United States	Rock		
Hakenkreuze	United States	Rock		
Hammer of Hate	Poland			
Hammer Strength	United States	Rock		
Hammertown	United States	Rock		
Hate Crimes	United States	Rock		
Hated and Proud	United States	Rock		
Hatemonger	United States	Rock		
Hate Train	United States			
Hyperborea	Italy	Rock		
The Invasion	Poland			
Infantry	United States			
Intimidation One	United States	Rock		
Honor	Poland			
Jew Slaughter	United States	Hatecore		
The Jigs	United States	Country		
Johnny Rebel	United States	Country	aka Clifford Trahan	
Kick to Kill	United States	Rock		
Kill or Be Killed	United States	Rock		
Kolovrat	Russia	Rock Against Communism		
Konkwista 88	Poland			
Kontingent 88	France	Rock Against Communism	Band from Angers, active from 1985 to 1991. It published Un jour viendra…, followed by Au service de nos ancêtres on the Rebelles Européens label.	
Landser	Germany	Rock	German neo-Nazi rock band; declared a criminal organization by Germany in 2003. Found to be one of the most popular bands (no. 13) among readers of the white power music magazine Resistance in a 2009 analysis.	
Last Orders	United Kingdom	Rock Against Communism	Based in Grimsby	
Legion	Poland		One of the earliest Polish white power bands; afiliated with the far-right group National Rebirth of Poland	
Légion 88	France	Rock Against Communism		
Legio Viking	Italy		Established in the 1990s, based in Livorno	
Lemovice	France	Rock Against Communism	Based in Limoges, active since 1999.	
Lightning Rod	United States	Rock		
Londinium SPQR	Italy		Established in the 1990s, based in Rome	
Luftwaffe Raid	United States			
Marching On	United States	Rock		
Max Resist	United States	Rock	Based in Detroit, aka Max Resist and the Hooligans. Found to be one of the most popular bands (no. 12) among readers of the white power music magazine Resistance in a 2009 analysis.	
Midgårds Söner	Sweden			
Midtown Bootboys	United States	Punk rock	Skinhead band based in Tulsa, Oklahoma and formed in 1986; heavily influenced by Skrewdriver. Affiliated with White Aryan Resistance and was promoted through their white supremacist WAR newspaper. Found to be one of the most popular bands (no. 15) among readers of the white power music magazine Resistance in a 2009 analysis.	
Millennium 7	United States	Rock		
Mistreat	Finland			
Mudoven	United States	Hatecore	The name Mudoven is a reference to the Holocaust and to Christian Identity ideology.	
The Nation	United States	Rock		
Nemesis	Scotland	Rock		
New Dawn	United Kingdom	Rock Against Communism	Based in Greenock	
De New Sheriff	United States	Country		
New Minority	United States	Rock		
No Alibi	United States	Rock		
Nokturnal Mortum	Ukraine	NSBM		
No Remorse	United Kingdom	Rock	Based in South London. Found to be one of the most popular bands (no. 4) among readers of the white power music magazine Resistance in a 2009 analysis (inclusive of Paul Burnley's music).	
Nordic Thunder	United States	Rock	Their lead singer Joe Rowan was killed in 1994; afterwards, former members founded the Blue Eyed Devils. Found to be one of the most popular bands (no. 8) among readers of the white power music magazine Resistance in a 2009 analysis.	
Nowy Lad	Poland		Established in the mid-1990s	
Odalmannen	Sweden	Folk		
Odin's Law	Canada	Rock		
Odwet 88	Poland		Established in the mid-1990s	
Oi Boys!	United States	Rock		
Oidoxie	Germany			
Ofensywa	Poland		Established in the mid-1990s	
Open Season	Australia			
The Order	United Kingdom		Based in London	
Otis and the 3 Bigots	United States	Country		
Patriotic Front	United States	Rock		
People Haters	United States	Rock		
Peggior Amico	Italy	Rock		
Pine Tree Riots	United States		Composed We'll Have Our Home Again	
Plastic Surgery	Italy		Established in 1981 in Vicenza as an apolitical band before shifting to white supremacist music two years later. One of the first racist skinhead bands in Italy.	
Plunder and Pillage	United States	Rock		
Pure Rampage	United States			
Prime Suspects	United Kingdom	Rock Against Communism	Based in Reading	
Prussian Blue	United States		Duo made up of two young twins, Lynx and Lamb Gaede; they later ceased being white nationalists.	
Quick and the Dead	Australia		One of the first Australian white power bands; its bassist Murray Holmes later joined Skrewdriver. Later regrouped to form the band White Noise/Final Solution.	
Race War	Germany		Neo-Nazi band established in 2001 in Ostalbkreis. It was banned by Germany as a criminal organization in 2006, the second such band to receive that designation (after Landser). Its members were convicted of forming a criminal organization and of incitement to hatred.	
Racist Redneck Rebels	United States			
RaHoWa	Canada		Name is short for "Racial Holy War"; RaHoWa is a slogan within the Creativity movement. Found to be one of the most popular bands (no. 3) among readers of the white power music magazine Resistance in a 2009 analysis.	
Ratten Gift	France	Rock Against Communism	Established in the 1980s, based in Beauvais.	
Razors Edge	United Kingdom		Based in the West Midlands. Affiliated with Combat 18	
Razzia	Italy		Established in the 1990s, based in Catania	
Reid Stubbs	United States	Country		
Rommel Skins	Italy			
Roughneck Rebel	United States	Country		
Riot Wing	United States	Rock		
Sampo	United States	Rock		
Sedition	United States	Rock		
Septembre Noir	France			
Shortfuse	United States	Rock		
Shutdown	United States	Rock		
Skin Army	Italy			
Skrewdriver	United Kingdom	Punk rock	Considered the foundational white power rock band by scholars. Found to the most popular band among readers of the white power music magazine Resistance in a 2009 analysis.	
Skullhead	United Kingdom	Rock Against Communism	Based in Newcastle	
Son of Mississippi	United States	Country		
Spreegeschwader	Germany			
Squadron	United Kingdom			
Steelcap	United States	Rock		
Storm	United Kingdom			
Stormcloak	N/A	Fashwave		
Straightlaced Nightmare	United States	Rock		
Stromschlag	Germany			
Stronghold	United States			
Svastika	Sweden			
Sleipnir	German			
SS Bootboys	United States			
Stahlgewitter	Germany		Name means "steel storm". Banned in Germany.	
Steelcapped Strength	Sweden			
Storm	Sweden			
Stormtroop 16	United States			
Sudden Impact	United Kingdom	Rock Against Communism	Based in Croydon	
Szczerbiec	Poland			
Sztorm 68	Poland		Established in the mid-1990s	
Tormentia	Poland			
Totenkopf	France	Rock Against Communism	Based in Mennecy, Esssonne. Active from 1985 to 1986.	
Tulsa Boot Boys	United States			
Vaginal Jesus	United States	Hatecore	Led by Seth Putnam, frontman of Anal Cunt. Released the album Affirmative Apartheid	
Vanguard	United States	Rock		
Vit Aggression	Sweden	Rock	Name means "white aggression".	
Vlajka	Czech Republic	Rock		
The Voice	United States	Rock		
Warfare 88	United States	Rock		
Warlord	United Kingdom		Based in London	
White American Youth	United States	Rock		
White Devils	Poland			
Whitelaw	United Kingdom			
White Hope	United States	Rock		
White Lightning	Australia			
White Master	Poland			
White Noise	Australia		Also called Final Solution. Reformation of Quick and the Dead.	
White Terror	United States	Rock		
Whitewash	United States	Rock		
White Wolf	United States	Rock		
Xurious	N/A	Fashwave		
Youngblood	United States	Rock		
Youngland	United States	Rock	Based in Orange County, California.	
Youth Defense League	United States	Rock		
Zadruga	Poland			

== See also ==
- List of National Socialist black metal bands
- Music and politics
