= Far-right subcultures =

Far right groups and organisations

Far-right subcultures refers to the symbolism, ideology and traits that hold relevance to various politically extreme right-wing groups and organisations.

The most commonly discussed far right subculture is the white power music scene that emerged from the skinhead culture, although other far right subcultures have been identified too. Other examples of far right subcultures include the alt-right and football hooligans.

== Background ==
A subculture is understood in cultural studies as a smaller group within a dominant mainstream culture that distinguishes itself through unique values, behaviors, styles, and signifying practices, or is unified by a deviant perspective. The Chicago school of sociology described subcultures in the mid-20th century as forms of deviancy. For example, Albert K. Cohen defined a “subculture” as a “culture within a culture,” that consists of “ways of thinking and doing that are in some respects peculiarly its own.” Later classic analysis comes from the Birmingham school of cultural studies. The Birmingham Centre for Contemporary Cultural Studies (BCCCS), particularly in the books ‘’Resistance Through Rituals’’, edited by Stuart Hall in 1976, and ‘’Subculture: The Meaning of Style’’ by Dick Hebdige, argued that youth subcultures—like punks or mods—use visible style as a symbolic form of resistance against class subordination and dominant capitalist norms. Skinheads were one of the classic subcultures they analysed. BCCS saw the 1960s and 1970s skinhead subculture as a complex, symbolic response to the decline of traditional British working-class communities. Hebdige and Phil Cohen saw the style was an exaggeration and imitation of traditional working-class masculinity.

Subcultures, which remain within dominant society, are distinguished from countercultures, which seek to escape or destroy dominant society. Taking up this conceptualisation, some scholars, especially in cultural criminology, have argued that the far right itself is a subculture (for example, Benjamin Lee lists the far right as one of several “lethal subcultures”, including Jihadism), while others have discussed whether fascist groups such as the British National Party should be seen as subcultures or countercultures. Cynthia Miller-Idriss sees the“far right as a site of cultural and subcultural engagement, particularly for youth”. She traces a change in far-right style to the turn of the twenty-first century, with a move away from the singular, hard-edged skinhead style and the emergence of what she calls “mainstream far-right subcultural brands and styles”: commercial clothing brands using coded fascist symbolism.

According to the research literature, most right-wing activists come to be involved in the far-right through radical subcultures rather than out of political commitment. Music genres, shared aesthetics and clothing styles serve as gateways to far right political organisations and as binding agents offering a sense of common subcultural belonging.

== Key far right subcultures ==
=== The European right in the twentieth century ===
When modern fascism emerged, it drew on the aesthetics and networks of earlier right-wing subcultures in the countries where it took hold. Violent masculinity was one element of this; according to one study, "Fascist subcultures were communities that celebrated violence, sought it out and imposed it on others, and they scorned those who would not fight as weak and unqualified for power."

=== Skinheads and white power music ===
“Emerging from the skinhead youth subculture in Britain at the end of the 1970s, and spreading to the continent and across the Atlantic in the following decade,” the white power music scene “served as accompaniment to a rising tide of racist and anti-immigrant violence in Germany, and become a focus of recruiting for the radical right world-wide.”

Over time, the White power music subculture has produced a number of music genres including Rock Against Communism (RAC) and National Socialist Black Metal (NSBM). There are several white power concert networks (such as Blood and Honour and Hammerskins) and music festivals, most notably the Ukrainian Asgardsrei festival. According to one study, “The excitement of being part of a subculture community contesting the mainstream norms might indeed contribute to attracting individuals, particularly youth in quest of significance and belonging, by providing them with a new sense of identity and affiliation.”

In the 1990s, “skinhead gangs carried out much of the violence associated with the far right, as violence against political opponents and immigrants was an integral part of their subculture.” They attracted young people through white power rock music and a vibrant scene. The music genres became integral to an increasingly international and violent scene in the late 1990s, leading to the SPLC to conclude “What was once a subculture of angry young racists is more and more the province of organized criminals.” However, the scene subsided in most of Western Europe in the 21st century.

=== National Socialist Black Metal and Neo-Paganism ===
National Socialist black metal (NSBM) is a far right subculture embedded in the larger black metal music scene, especially in Northern Europe but spreading globally, including to South America. Its participants express antisemitism, White nationalism and nostalgia for 20th century fascism and Nazism, motifs that stem from the pagan and anti-Christian tropes common in black metal lyrics and culture, rather than under the influence of far right political organisations. Heathenry has played a part in this subculture.

=== Siege Culture and accelerationism ===
While the post-war American far right was typically culturally conservative, James Mason - inspired by subcultures such as bikers and hippies and by Charles Manson - attempted to fuse fascism with alternative culture. His newsletter and later book, Siege, advocated for this. Although extremely marginal when it ceased publication in the 1980s, it became influential on neo-Nazis after it was published in 1992 by extreme culture journalist Michael J. Moynihan, who is also known for co-writing Lords of Chaos, a book about black metal. Mason inspired a scene called Siege Culture that would be associated in the current century with accelerationism.

=== Hardbass and Fashwave ===
In contemporary European and North American far-right contexts, new cultural expressions have emerged that differ from traditional skinhead subcultures in their aesthetic presentation and ideological framing. These include Hardbass, an electronic dance music-centered subculture prevalent in Europe during the early 2010s, and Fashwave.

=== Alt right digital subcultures ===
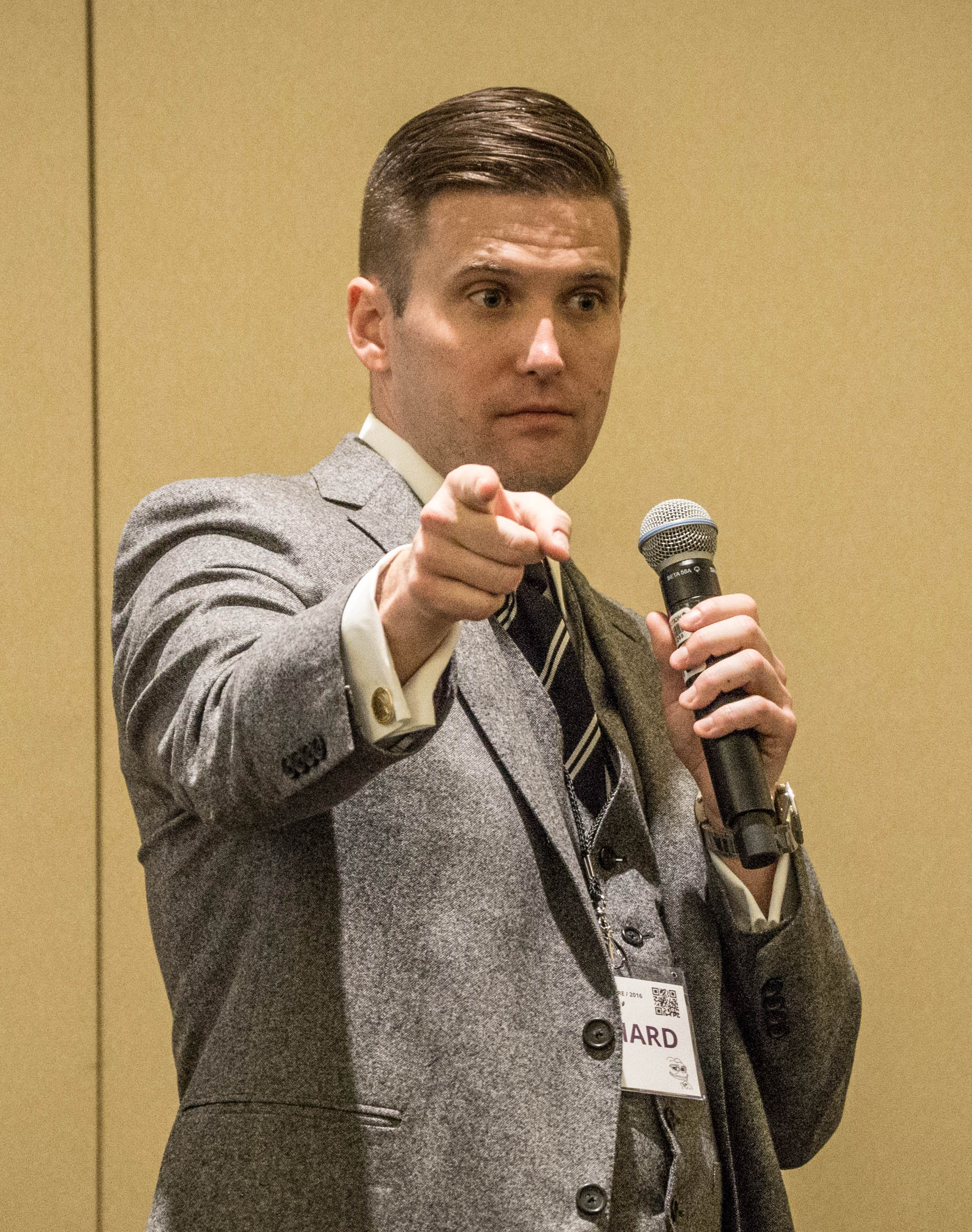
Richard B. Spencer speaking at an alt-right meeting, 2016

In the 2010s, the alt-right was one of the most prominent far right subcultures. Also referred to as the alternative right, the alt-right is a recently formed political movement which holds extreme views on a wide array of political, cultural, racial and religious issues, with their central themes being white supremacy and white nationalism. It gained a significant amount of prominence since the run-up to the presidential election of 2016, in which Donald Trump was elected.

The alt right has included several digital subcultures, flourishing on platforms such as 4Chan, including groypers.

Meme culture has come to play a major role in recent far right subcultures, as a way of generating in-group belonging and differentiating from mainstream cultures.

While much of the literature emphasises the declining role of masculinity in post-skinhead far right subcultures, there has also been the emergence of paramilitary and combat-focused right-wing subcultures in this period, including those around White Rex and Active Clubs.

== Subcultural parasitism ==
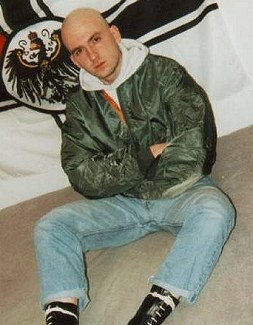
A neo-Nazi skinhead from Germany

Far-right ideologists try to infiltrate subcultures in order to spread their ideas among them. These attempts are defined as subcultural parasitism. The most well-known subculture that has been taken over by the far-right and neo-Nazis is the skinhead scene, which originated in Great Britain. Some examples of subculture parasitism: the nipster, infiltration of the hipster by neo-Nazis (Nazi Hipster), Nazi punk, infiltration of the heavy metal subculture, known as National Socialist black metal (NSBM/NSCH). Subcultures such as the Goth subculture and the hip hop subculture have also been infiltrated by far-right movements and ideologists.

Following the far right’s relative success in instrumentalising skinhead subculture, it has attempted to follow this model with left-wing subcultures; the autonomous nationalists scene is one such attempt, targeting the autonomen scene in Germany.

== See also ==
- Far-right politics
- Far-right social centres
- Nazi chic
