= List of National Socialist black metal bands =

This is a list of musical artists who are, or have been alleged to have been, part of the National Socialist black metal scene. National Socialist black metal (usually shortened to NSBM, and also known as neo-Nazi black metal or Aryan black metal) is a political movement within black metal music that promotes neo-Nazism and similar fascist or far-right ideologies. NSBM artists typically combine neo-Nazi imagery and ideology with ethnic European paganism, Satanism, or Nazi occultism, or a combination thereof, and vehemently oppose Christianity, Islam and Judaism. NSBM is not seen as a distinct genre, but as a völkisch movement within black metal. Additionally, a number of black metal bands and musicians who may not explicitly promote neo-Nazi or fascist ideology in their lyrics maintain close ties with other NSBM bands, labels, and neo-Nazi or right-wing extremist organizations, or otherwise espoused neo-Nazi or extreme right wing ideology in their personal lives. All entries in this list have been explicitly mentioned as being part of the NSBM scene in reliable sources.

== A ==
- Absurd
- Abusiveness
- Ad Hominem
- Adolfkult
- Aryan Blood
- Aryan Terrorism
- Astrofaes

== B ==
- Baise ma Hache
- Bannerwar
- Before God
- Bilskirnir
- Blutkult
- Branikald
- Burzum (Note: Fischer writes that "Burzum thus represents somewhat of a paradox in his NSBM label: Vikernes's politics have been predominantly asserted through nonmusical mediums, meaning that the political understandings of his music are often applied retroactively and rely on extramusical context to fully understand." Similarly, Daniel Lukes and Stanimir Panayotov write that "Burzum is often characterized as NSBM, but their early albums and their music in general is not explicitly political, even by "apoliteic" standards.")

== C ==
- Capricornus
- Clandestine Blaze

== D ==
- Dark Fury
- Der Stürmer

== E ==
- Eisenwinter
- Eugenik
- Evil

== F ==
- Forest

== G ==
- Gaszimmer
- Gestapo 666
- Gestapo SS
- Gontyna Kry
- Grand Belial's Key
- Graveland (Note: Graveland was central to the Polish NSBM scene and has been labeled as NSBM. The band itself disputes this label and its lyrics avoid political subjects. Rob Darken from the band has said: "I do not think Graveland is an NSBM band. Graveland is regarded as a NSBM band because of my political convictions, [which] most people would call extreme right-wing National Socialist convictions.")
- Grom
- Goatmoon

== H ==
Hagl

Herrenvolk

== I ==
- Infernal War/Infernal SS
- Infernum

== K ==
- Kataxu
- Kristallnacht
- Kroda

== L ==
- Legion of Doom
- Leibstandarte
- Leichenzug
- Lord Wind

== M ==
- М8Л8ТХ
- Menneskerhat

== N ==
- Naer Mataron
- Nacht Und Nebel
- Nezhegol
- Nitberg
- Nokturnal Mortum
- Nokturne

== P ==
- Patris
- Peste Noire

== R ==
- Reich of the Black Sun

== S ==
- Seigneur Voland
- Selbstmord
- Shepot run
- Sokyra Peruna
- Spear of Longinus
- Stahlfront
- Stutthof
- Sunwheel
- Svarga

== T ==
- Temnozor
- Thor's Hammer
- Thunderbolt (until circa 2000) (Note: The band was active in the NSBM scene but has since rejected the genre in favor of Satanism. Band member Paimon stated in a 2005 interview that "We have – nothing – in common with this so-called 'NSBM' scene since five years or so... Our involvement in the 'NSBM' scene is the past and we're not a part of it anymore.")
- The True Frost
- Totenburg

== U ==
- Ulfhethnar

== V ==
- Veles
- Velimor

== W ==
- Wehrhammer
- Wodulf
- Wolfnacht

== See also ==
- Asgardsrei festival
- List of white power music acts
- Rock Against Communism
- Nazi punk
- White power music
- White power skinhead
