= Blood & Honour =

Neo-Nazi music promotion network

Official logo

Blood & Honour is a neo-Nazi music promotion network and far-right political group founded in the United Kingdom by Ian Stuart Donaldson and Nicky Crane in 1987. It is composed of neo-Nazis and has links to Combat 18.

Sometimes the code 28 is used to represent Blood & Honour, derived from the second and eighth letters of the Latin alphabet, B and H, and the group uses Nazi symbolism. Its official website self-describes as a "musical based resistance network" and dubs its "global confederacy of freedom fighters" Brotherhood 28.

In the UK, the group used to organise white power concerts by Rock Against Communism (RAC) bands. It publishes a magazine called Blood and Honour. There are official divisions in several countries, including two rival groups in the United States. It is banned in several countries, including Germany, Spain, Russia, and Canada. In January 2025, the UK government applied financial sanctions to the organisation under counter-terrorism regulations.

== History ==
Blood & Honour was established in 1987 by Skrewdriver frontman Ian Stuart Donaldson, supported by the bands No Remorse, Brutal Attack, Sudden Impact, and Squadron. These bands were previously affiliated with the White Noise Club, a subsidiary organisation of the National Front responsible for organising Rock Against Communism concerts, operating the White Noise Records label, and publishing a zine called White Noise.

Tensions between Donaldson and the leadership of the White Noise Club developed in 1987, as Donaldson felt that the White Noise Club was siphoning money out of the Rock Against Communism scene to use for the National Front's political campaigns. Donaldson's Skrewdriver officially split from the White Noise Club in May 1987, and several other bands within the scene followed.

Blood & Honour was launched as an alternative to the White Noise Club in July 1987, with the appearance of the first edition of Blood & Honour magazine. Copies were sent free of charge to members of the White Noise Club (Donaldson used contacts within the National Front to obtain their mailing list), together with a note by Donaldson denouncing the White Noise Club as a "corrupt rip-off". A concert to "launch" Blood & Honour was held at the St Helier Arms on the 5th of September, 1987, featuring performances from Skrewdriver, No Remorse, Brutal Attack, and Sudden Impact.

By the end of 1988, Blood & Honour magazine was a quarterly that had grown from eight to 16 pages after a few issues. The magazine included concert reports, band interviews, readers' letters, RAC record charts and a column called "White Whispers". A mail-order service called Skrewdriver Services soon formed within its pages, selling items such as white power albums, T-shirts and flags; Loyalist music tapes; and Swastika pendants.

The back page of Blood & Honour Issue Number 13 advertised a Skrewdriver concert in London on 12 September 1992. Posters and fliers were posted around the country, advertising the concert and listing a redirection point as Waterloo Rail Station. The night before the concert, Donaldson was attacked in a Burton pub. The next day, police closed down Waterloo Station and the tube station, preventing many people from reaching the redirection point. Hundreds more Blood & Honour supporters who had journeyed from abroad were turned back at ports in Folkestone and Dover. The Blood & Honour supporters clashed with anti-fascist protesters. Missiles such as bricks and champagne bottles taken from bins outside of South Bank restaurants were used during the ensuing riot. Battles ensued for about two hours until the police separated the two groups, and the concert proceeded in the function hall of the Yorkshire Grey pub in Eltham, South-East London. The incident got international media coverage and became known as the "Battle of Waterloo".

In 1992, the newly formed Midlands division organised the annual Blood & Honour White Xmas concert. On 19 December, over 400 supporters gathered at a working men's club in Mansfield to watch No Remorse, Razors Edge and Skrewdriver perform. In 1993, the East Midlands division planned to stage an outdoor festival on 31 July. Donaldson was arrested and served with an injunction order not to perform at the concert. The venue was blockaded by the police, who seized amplifiers and confiscated sound equipment. It was the biggest police operation in the area since the Miners strikes in the early 1980s.

Later that year, the East Midlands division organised a concert for 25 September. Three nights before the concert, Donaldson and a few friends were travelling in a car that spun out of control into a ditch. Donaldson and another passenger died, and other passengers had minor wounds. The following day, 100 Skrewdriver supporters travelled to the Blood & Honour social in the Midlands, unaware of the deaths.

Each year, on or near the anniversary of Donaldson's death, a large memorial concert is held. In 2008, a concert in Redhill, Somerset attracted widespread BBC, radio and newspaper coverage. The memorial concert to mark the 20th anniversary of the death of Donaldson reportedly was the biggest associated gig in the UK with between 1,000 and 1,200 people attending. On the 23rd anniversary of the death of founder, Ian Stuart Donaldson, the annual memorial gig once again attracted international television and media coverage.

Blood & Honour remains active in the UK but has contracted since the 1980s and 1990s; researchers Matthew Worley and Nigel Copsey suggest that its membership consists mainly of "heavily-tattooed men in their fifties reliving their 'glory days' at occasional gigs in back-room pubs". As of 2019, the organisation organises up to fifteen concerts a year in the UK.

In January 2025, the UK Government announced a full asset freeze against Blood & Honour, "an entity it has reasonable grounds to suspect of being involved in terrorist activities through promoting and encouraging terrorism, seeking to recruit people for that purpose and making funds available for the purposes of its terrorist activities".

== Description and symbolism ==
The group is composed of neo-Nazis and has links to Combat 18. Its official website self-describes as a "musical based resistance network" and dubs its "global confederacy of freedom fighters" Brotherhood 28.

Sometimes the code 28 is used to represent Blood & Honour, derived from the second and eighth letters of the Latin alphabet, B and H. Though different national chapters of Blood & Honour use different Nationalist symbols based on their location, common symbolic traits include the usage of a modernised Blackletter script, colours of the Nazi German flag, and other Nazi symbolism, including the Totenkopf Death's Head insignia of the SS-Totenkopfverbände and concentration camp units.

== International groups ==
By 1989, Blood & Honour magazine had international circulation, and over the next decade, branches formed across all of Europe, North America, and Australia.

=== Western Europe ===
==== Germany ====
The white power skinhead subculture had spread to Germany in the early 1980s, introduced by British troops stationed there. German label Rock-O-Rama Records had Skrewdriver and other English RAC bands on their roster.

Blood & Honour Deutschland formed in 1994. The branch published their own magazine, and were prolific in organising white power music concerts. Uwe Mundlos, Uwe Böhnhardt, and Beate Zschäpe—perpetrators of the National Socialist Underground murders—were supported by members of the Thuringia and Saxony chapters of Blood & Honour.

In 2000, the German government banned Blood & Honour Deutschland as a criminal organisation, and raided the homes of thirty members. Köehler reports that the group immediately reformed under the name Division 28 (B and H being the second and eight letters of the alphabet respectively) and continued their previous activities.

==== Netherlands ====
A Dutch branch of Blood & Honour called under the name Hou Kontakt formed in the early 1990s, but collapsed around 1995.

In 2001, a group of neo-Nazi skinheads from Limburg called the Mijnstreek-Oost Skins formed a new branch under the name Blood & Honour Nederland. A contingent of dissatisfied ex-members of the Nederlandse Volks-Unie (NVU) joined in the following year. They had been affiliated with a radical offshoot of the NVU called the Racial Volunteer Force (RVF), led by Eite Homan.

In 2004, the NVU/RVF affiliates split away to form their own branch, using the names B&H/RVF and B&H/C18. The remainder of Blood & Honour Nederland continued, using the name Blood & Honour Traditional. The RVF branch criticised the Traditional branch for focussing too much on social events, concerts, and drinking, rather than political action, and were notable for their extreme "outspoken support of violence" and extreme antisemitism.

Relations between the two groups were hostile. At a 2004 concert organised by the NVU, members of B&H/RVF stormed the stage to attack Slovenian band Skullkrusher; Skullkrusher were affiliated with the Traditional wing of Blood & Honour, and had disparaged a local C18 chapter in an interview with Blood & Honour magazine.

Blood & Honour Nederland was at its peak around 2006, having experienced success with recruiting from a far-right element of the gabber subculture called "Lonsdalers". By 2010, the membership of these groups had collapsed, and there were only two or three regional Blood & Honour branches active. As of 2022, Blood & Honour played "little if any role of significance in the Netherlands," according to a government report.

==== France ====
A French branch of Blood & Honour formed in 1999 under the name Blood & Honour Midgard. By 2010, this branch had closed, and a new group called Blood & Honour Hexagone formed in 2011. This group was based in the south of France near Marseille, and was led by Loïc Delboy. Blood & Honour Hexagone had only 12 members, with another 4 "prospective members" and 7 "supporters", but their concerts drew hundreds of attendees. Blood & Honour Hexagone was disbanded by the French government in 2019. Three of its leaders were also prosecuted for "participation in a combat group", but all were acquitted of this charge in 2022. Four members were convicted of separate weapons offences and imprisoned or fined.

Belgium

In 2001, Blood & Honour Midgard founded a section in Flanders called Blood & Honour Midgard Vlaanderen. This group was headquartered in Bruges. Three skinheads from this chapter killed a black man in a random attack in 2006. In October 2008, the leader and two other key members from this Midgard branch were arrested for violating Belgium's Anti-Racism Law. Two concerts that they organised had been filmed by undercover police and a journalist, who captured attendees giving the Nazi salute and calling for the persecution of Jews. All three were convicted in 2011 and sentenced to three months of imprisonment, suspended for two of the men.

A separate group in Flanders formed in the same year, calling themselves Blood & Honour Vlaanderen. Unlike the Midgard branch, this group was not officially recognised by Blood & Honour's UK leadership. They were also known as Bloed, Bodem, Eer, Trouw (BBET), which was the name of the magazine they published.

=== Nordic countries ===
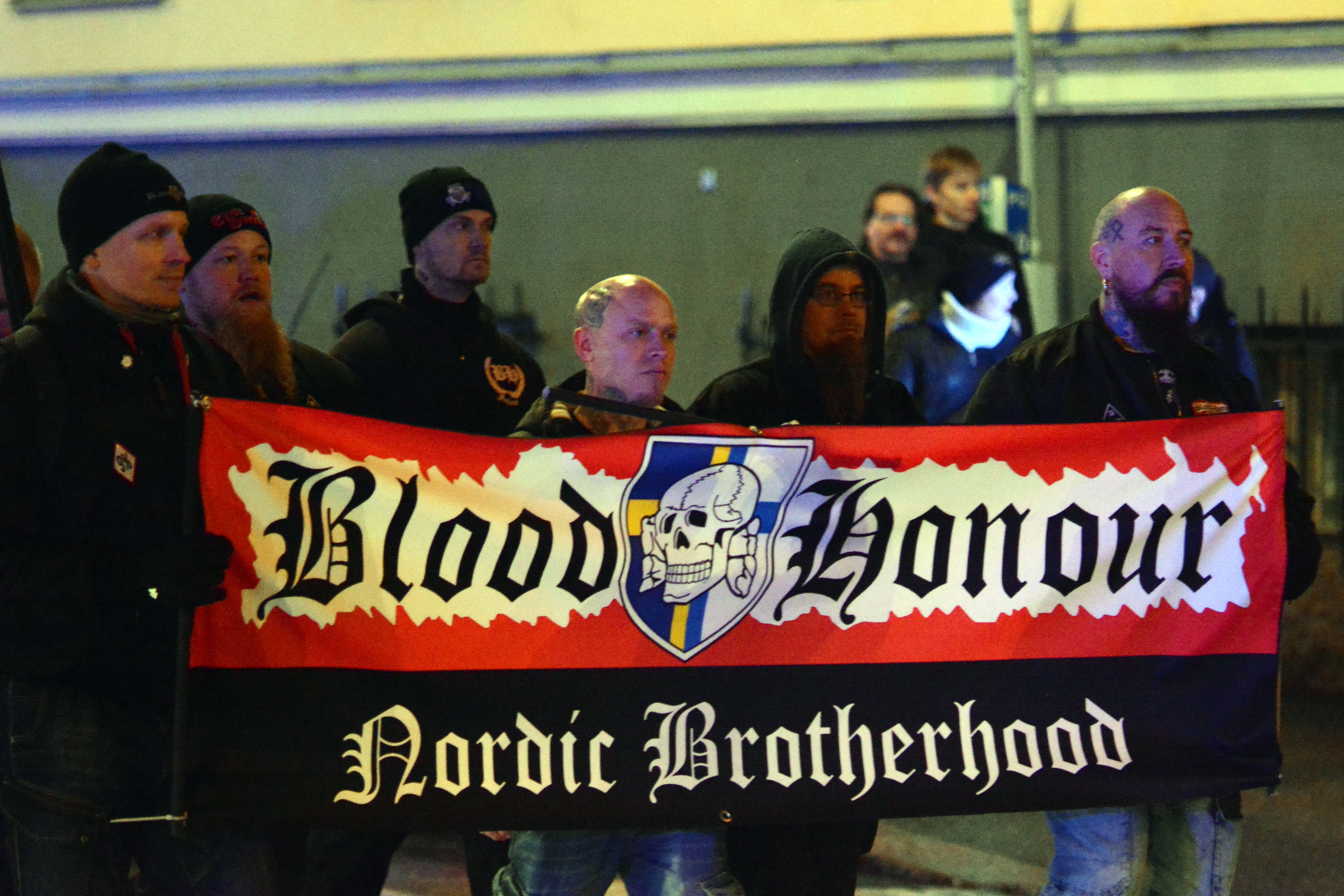
Blood & Honour demonstrating on Finnish independence day

==== Scandinavia ====
Blood and Honour Scandinavia was formed in 1996 by Marcel Schilf and Erik Blücher, with headquarters in Sweden. Schilf and Blücher were allied with Combat 18, and supported that faction's bid for control of Blood & Honour in the United Kingdom. Blood & Honour Scandinavia published an English-language magazine and maintained a website, where Blücher posted his writings under the pseudonym Max Hammer. These writings advocated a strategy of "leaderless resistance" to incite a race war. They established a Danish branch in 1998, which also published its own magazine. Schilf and another key member died in 2001; a leadership struggle followed, and the group soon disintegrated.

Finnish Blood & Honour member Marko "Jäsä" Järvinen ran the Ainaskin video production company. Järvinen produced video magazine "Kriegsberichter" that contained violent Nazi propaganda like a refugee center being burned down and instructions on how to build explosives.

==== Finland ====
A short-lived Finnish chapter of Blood & Honour formed in the mid-1990s. A second iteration formed in 2003, and was still active as of 2020. Finnish Blood & Honour has enjoyed the patronage of multiple neo-Nazi groups, including the radical splinter of the Constitutional Right Party "National Culture Front", Finland - Fatherland and most recently the Nordic Resistance Movement (NRM). Blood & Honour members were photographed in the independence day rally with the Soldiers of Odin in 2018 and 2019. Members of Blood & Honour have been candidates for the far-right Finns Party. Finns Party councillor Risto Helin was photographed wearing a Blood & Honour shirt and he donated Adolf Hitler paraphernalia to an affiliated skinhead club in Vaasa. Blood & Honour gained attention in Finland when an affiliated "April Group" distributed "wanted dead or alive" posters of Left Alliance chair Suvi-Anne Siimes.

Finnish pro-MMA fighter Niko Puhakka ran security for Blood & Honour Helsinki. The skinheads got into an armed confrontation with another gang on 14 August 2012 at the Roihupelto club where Puhakka was wounded by a bullet. Prominent members of the associations who rent for Blood & Honour are Atte Enroth and Jarkko Räsänen who have convictions for anti-immigrant violence stretching back to the 1990s.

Blood & Honour Kouvola organized charity football matches and concerts for disabled veterans in 2005, and were donated the use of the city's stadium for the event. After the media brought up Blood & Honour's violently racist character, the representatives of the city denied knowing what sort of organization it was. The event raised thousands of euros, which were accepted by the veterans' organization, although they stated they do not endorse Blood & Honour.

Since 2022 Finnish Blood & Honour has organized an annual "White Boy Summer Fest" together with Hammerskins and Veren Laki (Law of Blood), a neo-Nazi combat sports collective connected to the NRM. The festival includes concerts and MMA tournament.

In 2022, members of Jyväskylä chapter sprayed activists of Extinction Rebellion with sewage during Rally Finland event.

In 2026, the Finnish Broadcasting Company (Yle) uncovered that a chapter in Jyväskylä had hosted neo-Nazis from across Europe in recent years at a community center owned by Jyväskylä Area Youth Center association. Photos taken from Facebook revealed that the community center was decorated with banners bearing racist and fascist symbols and slogans. The bands sang songs glorifying lynching of Black people. Yle also revealed the Jyväskylä chapter’s clubhouse’s secret address, and the landlord decided to terminate the tenancy agreement and evict them.

==== Switzerland ====
In late October 2026, a concert by the German Oi! band "Krawallbrüder" took place in Tuggen, Switzerland, during which members of "Blood & Honour" appeared. A group of neo-Nazis began provoking others by performing the Hitler salute and shoving fellow concertgoers. Among them was the neo-Nazi R. M. (55), nicknamed "Manole." He maintained close ties to the far-right terrorist group "National Socialist Underground" (NSU), which murdered nine migrants and a police officer in Germany between 2000 and 2007. Although the neo-Nazi group was initially ejected from the venue by security staff, they soon returned and once again performed Hitler salutes. When other guests intervened, a brawl broke out, during which a German man was struck by a punch, knocked to the ground, and subsequently died in the hospital.

Swiss police have arrested a 42-year-old Swiss "Blood & Honour" activist in the canton of Schwyz. The public prosecutor's office is investigating the incident as a case of intentional homicide.

=== Southern Europe ===
==== Spain ====
A Spanish branch formed in 1999 under the name "Asociación Cultural Sangre y Honor" (transl. "Cultural Association Blood & Honour). The group was headquartered in San Sebastián de los Reyes, with sections in four other Spanish cities. They organised RAC concerts, sold neo-Nazi merchandise, and published a free magazine from 2001. In 2010, 14 members were found guilty of criminal association and possession of illegal weapons. The Madrid court ordered the dissolution of Sangre y Honor as an unlawful association, and the Supreme Court upheld this decision in 2011.

==== Greece ====
A Greek chapter, Blood & Honour Hellas, formed in 1999. They were supported by far-right political party Golden Dawn, and maintained links.

=== United States ===
In the United States, two rival groups claim the name: Blood and Honour Council USA and Blood and Honour America Division.

=== Other countries ===
Blood & Honour is banned in several countries. It was banned in Russia in 2012 for perpetrating terror attacks and Sergei Golubev, the leader of the Russian section promoting neo-Nazis adopting Islamic terror tactics. In 2019, the government of Canada placed Blood & Honour on its list of designated terrorist groups.

In 1999, some Blood & Honour groups published support on their official websites for the Malexander murders in Sweden.

In Slovenia the right-wing ruling Slovenian Democratic Party (SDS) has facilitated connections with the extreme right, Blood & Honour members serving as candidates in multiple localities. Investigative journalist Anuška Delić claimed she was targeted by the SDS government for documenting these ties.

Blood & Honour Australia & the Southern Cross Hammerskins have been organising the annual Ian Donaldson Memorial concert in Melbourne since 1994. Reports by the media that the concert in 2019 was cancelled at the last minute were false, as it went ahead as it does each year without incident.

In August 2026, 18 Blood & Honour members were arrested in Plovdiv, Bulgaria in connection with a murder. The members were also linked to an attack on Nepalese citizens.

== See also ==
- Bloed-Bodem-Eer en Trouw (Flemish splinter group of Blood & Honour Vlaanderen)
- List of white power music acts
- List of neo-Nazi organizations
- Nazi punk
- Vlaamse Militanten Orde
- White power skinhead
- List of white nationalist organizations
