= Mudde =

Mudde is a surname. Notable people with the surname include:

- Cas Mudde (born 1967), Dutch political scientist
- Musa Mudde (born 1990), Ugandan footballer
- Tim Mudde (born 1965), Dutch activist
