= Skullhead =

English punk band

- Origin: Newcastle, England
- Genres: Oi!; white power rock
- Years active: 1984–1994, 2001–2002
- Past members: Kevin Turner; Tim Ward; Spin Brown; Nick Shaw

Skullhead was a nationalist Oi! band from the Newcastle area. It was part of the Rock Against Communism (RAC) movement.

== History ==
Formed in Consett in March 1984, their debut album White Warrior was released in 1987 (released by United Records, a subsidiary of Rock-O-Rama Records). The line-up on the album was Kevin Turner (vocals), Tim Ward (guitar), ‘Spin’ Brown (bass) and Nick Shaw (drums). Skullhead joined the National Front's White Noise Club, and when most of other British RAC bands left to join Blood & Honour, Skullhead remained with the White Noise Club till its end. The band’s second LP Odin’s Law was released in 1991 by United Records. The line-up for this LP was Turner (vocals), Craig Bond (guitar), Pete (guitar), ‘Spin’ Brown (bass) and Raish Carter (drums). Carter had previously been in punk band Red London. The LP was produced by Martin Cross, who later was sentenced to life imprisonment for murder. The band’s final live appearance was in Brandenburg, Germany in 1992.

Turner spent 1989 as an inmate of Acklington Prison, and received a jail term in 1991 for grievous bodily harm after assaulting a man in Consett. Bond was jailed in December 1993 for a racist attack on a group of students in Sunderland. He pleaded guilty to violent disorder. Bond, who was already serving a nine-month sentence for an assault on an anti-fascist, got another three years. Skullhead split-up in 1993. Following the split Turner became a techno MC using the moniker MC Techno T.

Turner reformed Skullhead in 2001 with Frazer Robinson on guitar, Russ on bass and Sticks on drums. Robinson had previously played in north-east RAC band Warhammer. They did a small tour of Germany, Slovakia and Switzerland and recorded an album titled Returned to Thunder, which was released the following year.

== Discography ==
- White Warrior LP (United Records, 1987)
- White Noise - We Want the Airwaves 12-inch EP with PALAZARD (A-side "Look ahead" by Skullhead; B-side "Red Light Runaway" by Palazard) (White Noise Records, 1988)
- Blame the Bosses / Celtic Warrior; Unemployed Voice 7-inch EP with VIOLENT STORM (Third Way, 1989)
- Odins Law LP (United Records, 1989)
- Rose of England / Townmoor festival 7-inch single (Street Rock 'N' Roll [sub-label of Rock-O-Rama Records], 1989)
- Blame the Bosses / Look Ahead 7-inch single (Street Rock 'N' Roll, 1990)
- Cry of Pain LP (United Records, 1991)
- Victory Or Valhalla Mini-LP (Rebelles Europeéns, 1992)
- Ragnarok (Victory Or Valhalla) full-length CD including R.E. LP + demos (ISD [Ian Stuart Donaldson Records], 1994)
- Return To Thunder CD (Backstreet Noise Music, 2002)
- Victory Or Valhalla CD (2002)
- Return To Thunder LP (PC-Records, 2003)

=== Compilations ===
- No Surrender vol. 4 (songs: Yuletide, Memories) LP (Rock-o-Rama, 1990)
- Gods of War vol. 4 songs: No more brothers war, Skinhead rock band) LP (White Power Records, 1991)
- Blood & Honour vol. 1 (songs: Push on, Hang the I.R.A.) CD (ISD, 1994)
- White Resistance vol. 2 (songs: Rock'n'Roll resistance, Fighting for victory) bootleg CD (C 18, 1997)
