= Tim Mudde =

Dutch politician and activist (born 1965)

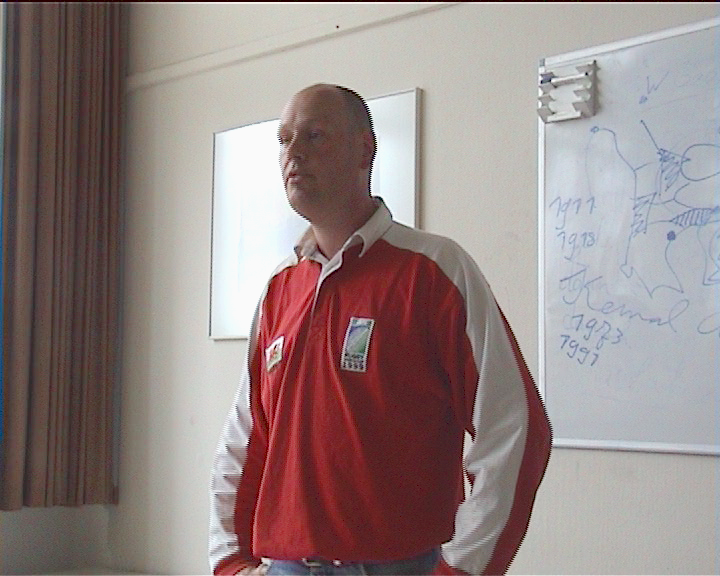
- Mudde in 2004
- Born: 23 February 1965 (age 61); Amsterdam, Netherlands
- Years active: 1980s–2010 (musician)
- Known for: Rock Against Communism
- Relatives: Cas Mudde (brother)

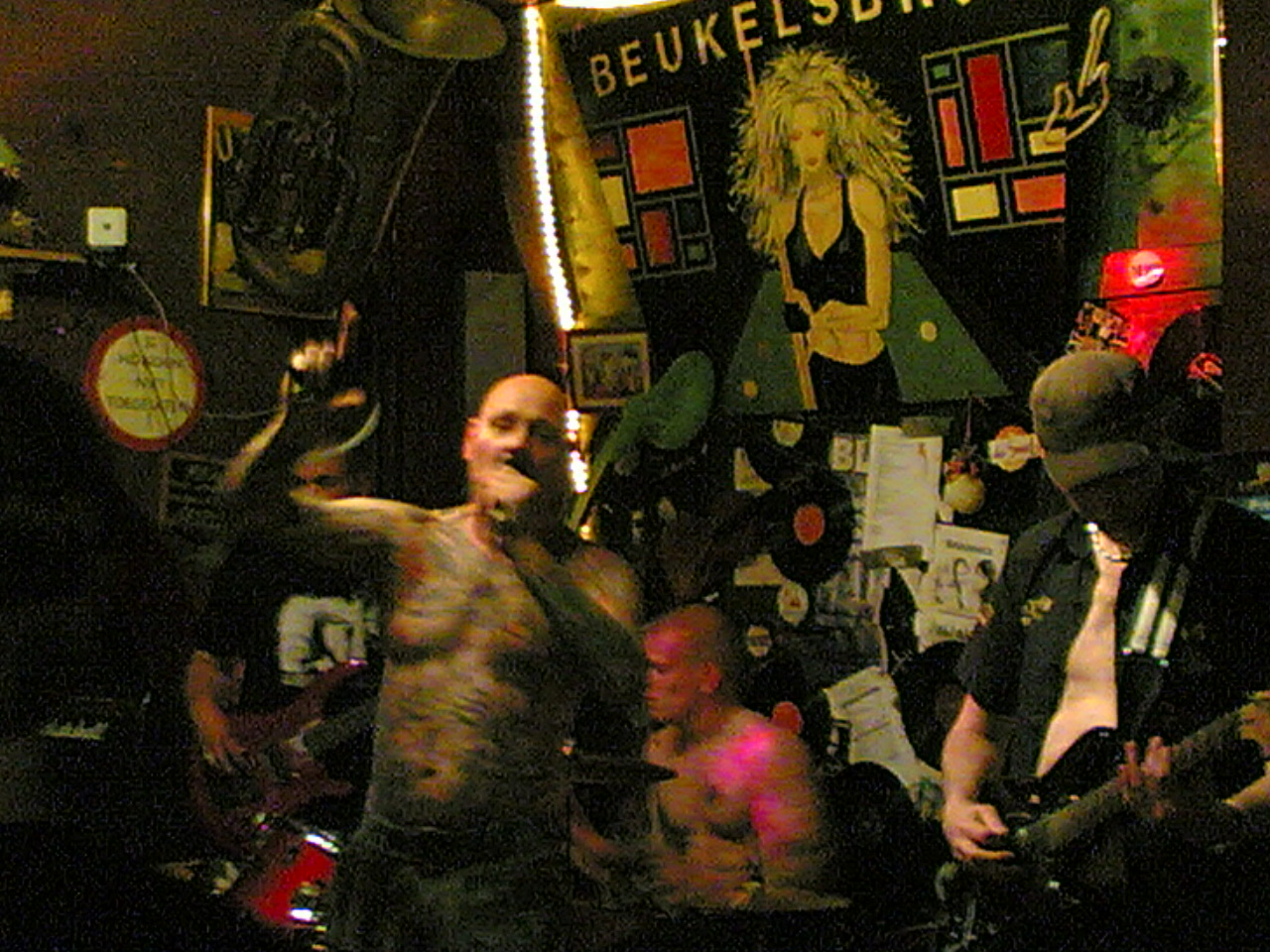
Brigade M in 2009

Tibor Rudolf "Tim" Mudde (born 23 February 1965), also known as Brigadier M, DJ Had Je Me Maar and Sassem Tim, is a former Dutch activist, politician, and musician who was active within the radical right movement in the Netherlands between the 1980s and the early 2010s. He was party secretary of the far-right Centre Party '86, an offshoot of the Centre Party, and like many other senior members of this party became active for Voorpost, and later founded the Nationale Beweging, the nationalist mail order company Fenris, and the nationalist internet radio station Radio Rapaille where he presented several shows.

Mudde played in the Rock Against Communism (RAC) band Brigade M, as well as the Feyenoord themed Oi! band Foienoord. He is the older brother of the political scientist Cas Mudde, who studies radical-right movements. In 1996, Mudde was one of the two founders of Brigade M, which initially was called Brigade Mussert referring to the personal bodyguards of Nazi sympathizer Anton Mussert.

Mudde was a member of other RAC/Nationalistic bands: Germanic-Slavonic Army (GSA), Opel Kadeath, Dietse Patriotten, Die Fünfte Kolonne, Distrikt 217, H6, O.D.M., Oi-Die-Poes and Sassem Bootbois (later called Sassem Bootboys). Mudde also had been involved with the RAC record companies Sassem Produkties and Muziek met wortels (Music with Roots). On 22 October 2005, he gave a speech for the National Alliance party about Antifaschistische Aktion. Mudde considered himself to be a nationalist rather than a neo-Nazi. In the 1980s and 1990s, he was convicted several times for offenses dealing with hate speech. In later years, Mudde has moved on from politics and founded a rugby club. This club existed until mid 2022.
