= Rebelles Européens =

Defunct French white power record label

Rebelles Européens was a French independent record label that operated between 1987 and 1994, specialising in white power rock and Rock Against Communism.

== History ==
Based in the port city of Brest, the label was founded by Gaël Bodilis, a member of far-right groups including the Front Nationale Jeunesse, Troisième Voie, and PNFE. Rebelles Européens was, alongside German label Rock-O-Rama Records, a key player within the international white power skinhead music scene during the late 1980s and early 1990s. Unlike Rock-O-Rama, whose owner was apolitical and commercially minded, Bodilis primarily conceived of Rebelles Européens as a means for spreading neo-fascist ideology, and denied any interest in the profitability of his enterprise. Rebelles Europeéns was notable for its brazen inclusion of Nazi and white-supremacist symbols on album covers; Robert Forbes and Eddie Stampton suggest that the label "seemed to operate without regard to the law". After a pause on production in 1993, Rebelles Europeéns went out of business in 1994, with Australian label White League reissuing a small number of their releases on CD in 1995.

Between 1987 and 1994, Rebelles Européens released forty-five twelve-inch records and thirty seven-inch records. The label also sold recordings of Nazi military music and other white power merchandise including shirts and books.

== Albums ==
Artist	Title	Year	Format, Special Notes	Code
Skin-Korps	Mister Clean	1987	LP	RE330187
V/A Bunker 84/Legion 88/Skin-Korps	Debout Vol. 1	1987	LP	RE330287
Bunker 84	Notre Combat!	1987	LP, CD	RE330387
No Remorse	This Time The World	1988	LP, CD	RE330488
Legion 88	Thule	1988	LP, CD	RE330588
V/A Bunker 84/No Remorse/Verde Bianco Rosso	Debout Vol. 2	1988	LP	RE330688
Bunker 84	Liberté!	1988	LP	RE330788
Machtoc	Premiere Foie	1989	LP	RE330889
V/A Dirlewanger/Powerskins/Nouvelle Croisade	Debout Vol. 3	1989	LP	RE330989
Public Enemy	There Is Only One Public Enemy	1989	LP, CD	RE331089
V/A Chauves Pourris/Lionheart/Guarda De Ferro	Debout Vol. 4	1989	LP	RE331189
Verde Bianco Rosso	Europa	1989	LP	RE331289
Kontingent 88	Au Service De Nos Ancétres	1989	LP, CD	RE331389
Lionheart	A New Beginning	1989	LP	RE331489
Dirlewanger	Rocking For The Golden Race	1989	LP, CD*	RE331589
V/A Public Enemy/No Remorse/Dirlewanger/Legion 88/Kontingent 88/Bunker 84/Chauves Pourris/Lionheart/White Lightning/Verde Biance Rosso	100 Birthday	1989	LP, CD	RE331689
Chauves Pourris	Jusqu'a La Mort	1990	LP	RE331790
Sturmtruppen	Es ist beit	1990	LP, CD	RE331890
Klasse Kriminale	Ci Incontreremo Ancora	1990	LP	RE331990
Peggior Amico	Il leone ruggisce ancore	1990	LP	RE332090
White Lightning	Destiny	1990	LP	RE332190
Lionheart	Ride Of The Valkyries	1990	LP	RE332290
Noie Werte	Kraft für Deutschland	1990	LP, CD	RE332390
Dirlewanger	Unity of Honour	1990	LP, CD**	RE332490
Verde Bianco Rosso	Radroni Del Mondo	1991	LP	RE332591
Kontingent	Generations Futures	1991	LP	RE332691
Open Season	Front Line Fighters	1991	LP, CD***	RE332791
Public Enemy	Our Weapon Is Truth	1991	LP, CD	RE332891
Battle Zone	Nowhere To Hide	1991	LP	RE332991
Paul Burnley & The 4th Reich	A Nation Reborn	1991	LP, CD	RE333091
Powerskin	Celtica Bianca Spada	1991	LP	RE333191
Paul Burnley & The 4th Reich	Save the White Race	1992	LP (12-inch EP)	RE333292
V/A White Noise/Division S/Verde Bianco Rosso	Debout Vol. 5	1992	LP	RE333392
Ultime Assaut	Deliverance	1992	LP	RE333492
Guarda De Ferro	G.D.F.	1992	LP	RE333592
Soccer Hoolys	We Are The Soccer Hoolys	1992	LP	RE333692
V/A British Standard/Close Shave/Grade One/English Rose/Razor's Edge/Paul Burnley & The 4th Reich	Last chance...	1992	LP	RE333792
English Rose	Never Be Silenced	1992	LP	RE333892
Dirlewanger	white power rock 'N' Roll	1992	LP	RE333992
No Remorse/Dirlewanger	Desert Storm	1992	LP (12-inch EP)	RE334092
Force De Frappe	Orage Mechanique	1992	LP	RE334192
Nahkampf	Schutt und Asche	1994	LP, CD****	RE334294
Skullhead	Victory or Valhalla	1994	LP	RE334394
Division 250	Sangre De Conquistadores	1994	LP	RE334494
Tolbiac's Toads	1983–1987	1994	LP	RE334594

== Singles ==
- RE450187 Legion 88 'Terroristes'
- RE450287 Bunker 84 'Vieux Continent'
- RE450387 Brutal Combat 'Passe A L'oueste'
- RE450487 Bunker 84 'Victime Des Democraties'
- RE450588 Legion 88 'Terroristes'/'Vaincre' (2nd pressing, 300 copies made)
- RE450689 Lionheart 'Better Dead Than Red'
- RE450789 Chauves Pourris 'Censure'
- RE450889 Peggior Amico 'Copevole Di Essere Bianco'
- RE450989 Public Enemy 'Waiting For The Storm'/'Saturday Night's Alright For Fighting (Reg 'Elton John' Dwight cover)
- RE451089 Kontingent 88 '1789/Mohamed'
- RE451189 No Remorse 'Time Will Tell'/'Solly'
- RE451289 No Remorse 'Smash The Reds'/Race Traitor'
- RE451389 Power Skins 'Mittel Europa'
- RE451489 English Rose 'Proud Nationalist Warriors'
- RE451589 Battlezone 'Way Of Death'/'National Sorrow'
- RE451690 Nouvelle Criosade 'Tu Aimeras'
- RE451790 Verde Bianco Rosso "Bionda Rossa E Nera'
- RE451890 Battlezone 'Right To March'/'Squalor'
- RE451990 Public Enemy 'For You'/'The Oath'
- RE452090 Lionheart 'Sign Of The Times'
- RE452190 Dirlewanger 'Nigger Season'/'Proud Of My Race'
- RE452290 Violent Storm "Land Of My Fathers'
- RE452390 Division S 'Efter Revolutionen'
- RE452490 Public Enemy 'Salute'/'White Nation Rock'
- RE452591 Legion 88 'Legion Blanche'
- RE452691 Ultima Thule 'Havets Vargar'
- RE452791 Grade One 'Hail The New Land'
- RE452891 Ultime Assaut 'Paris'
- RE452991 Peggior Amico 'Diritto Di Marciare'
- RE453092 Ovaltinees 'British Justice E.P.'
- RECD0191 Noie Werte 'Kraft Fur Deutschland'
- RECD0291 Battlezone 'Nowhere To Hide'
- RECD0391 Paul Burnley & The 4th Reich 'A Nation Reborn'
- RECD0492 No Remorse 'This Time The World'
- RECD0592 Ultima Thule 'Svea Hjaltar'
- RECD44 Debout Vol. 6 Oi Oi! Skins (Ovaltinees/Kontingent/Battlezone/Power Skins/Lionheart/Grade One/Legion 88/Chauves Pourris/Vengeance/ABH/Diehards/Quick & The Dead)
- CDs "WHITE LEAGUE" label:
- WL9501 Public Enemy 'There Is Only One Public Enemy'
- WL9502 Legion 88 'Thule'
- WL9503 100 Birthday
- WL9504 Dirlewanger S/T
- WL9505 Bunker 84 "Notre Combat'
- WL9506 Kontingent 88 "Au Service De Nos Ancetres'
- WL9507 Public Enemy 'Our Weapon Is Thuth'
- WL7 Legion 88/Open Season split 7-inch

== See also ==
- List of record labels
