= Absurd (band) =

German black metal band classified as a right-wing extremist group

- The band’s logo used from 1999 to 2020, featuring a broken Sun Cross and Thor’s Hammer, drawn by Christophe Szpajdel. Sometimes featured with a regular Sun Cross.

Background information
- Origin: Sondershausen, Thuringia, Germany
- Genres: Black metal, pagan metal
- Years active: 1992–1994, 1994–1995, 1998–2012, 2017–present
- Labels: Weltenfeind; Darker Than Black
- Members: JFN; Widar; Leichenaar; KPS; Unhold; Gelal
- Past members: C. H. Surt; Damien Thorn; Dark Mark Doom; Wolf; Tormentor; Thorns; Ansuz; Vinzent; Deimos
- Website: https://hordeabsurd.com (JFN’s Absurd) https://weltenfeind.com/absurd (Unhold’s Absurd)

Absurd is a German black metal band that has been classified as a "right-wing extremist" group by the Thuringian Landesbehörde für Verfassungsschutz.

Their lyrics concern nationalistic, pagan (Hendrik Möbus is the founder of the Deutsche Heidnische Front), pro-heathen revivalist Germanic, and anti-Judeo-Christian themes.

== History ==
=== 1992: Formation ===
The band was founded in Sondershausen by Hendrik Möbus (also known as Randall Flagg, Jarl Flagg Nidhögg and JFN) and Sebastian Schauseil (Dark Mark Doom) in 1992, with a third member, Damien Thorn, joining at a later stage who was later replaced by Andreas Kirchner (C.H. Surt).

=== 1993: Murder of Sandro Beyer ===
The band achieved infamy because its original members (not in the band since 1999) murdered Sandro Beyer, a 15-year-old boy, in 1993. The canonical motive is that Beyer was privy to an illicit relationship of Schauseil's with a married woman (who was Beyer's teacher in an evangelical Christian church) and had been spreading rumours about this and other activities of the band. On 29 April in Sondershausen, the then-17-year-old band members Möbus, Schauseil, and Kirchner enticed Beyer to a meeting, and strangled him there with an electrical cord. (Note: Möbus claims it was Schauseil and Kirchner who strangled him and it's stated in the court's report.) Kirchner, in a now-infamous quotation, was reported as saying: "Oh, shit—now I've completely ruined my life." Schauseil claimed to have heard a voice in his head saying the nonsensical phrase "Küster Maier", which he interpreted as "Töte Beyer" ("Kill Beyer").

=== 1993–1998: Imprisonment ===
In prison, Möbus (born 20 January 1976) was able to carry on with the band under the temporary name "In Ketten" (German for "In Chains"). A live album was recorded in prison and had since been released on vinyl. The tape Thuringian Pagan Madness shows on its cover the grave of the murdered Sandro Beyer, and inside says: "The cover shows the grave of Sandro B. murdered by horde ABSURD on 29.04.93 AB".

The band members were released on parole in 1998, because they had been under eighteen when they had committed their crime. Shortly after release, Möbus violated the terms of his parole when at a concert he performed the Hitler salute, which is illegal in Germany. Hendrik and his brother Ronald "Wolf" Möbus also posed together in a series of photographs at Auschwitz death camp, holding up Nazi banners inside a gas chamber and outside barracks. His parole was consequently revoked. He managed to flee to the United States, where he met William Luther Pierce, but was captured there. During his stay in America he also got in a conflict about money with some of his contacts who he stayed with for some time, one of them being the then neo-Nazi pagan occultist Nathan Pett, who later left the far-right scene, and was apparently beaten with a hammer and threatened with a pistol by two persons. At first this was just a rumour, but Möbus later admitted in an interview for a neo-Nazi site that the incident had taken place. He was arrested by U.S. marshals. In 2001, after his request for asylum was denied, he was sent back to prison for the remaining three years for murder. For mocking his victim and for the Hitler salute, he was sentenced to a further 26 months. On 15 May 2003, he was again sentenced to four years in prison. Möbus has since been freed and runs his own music label, called Darker Than Black Records (founded in 1994), which distributes NSBM albums and merchandise on an organized scale since 2007. Two cars belonging to Möbus were damaged in an arson which the Antifascist Action Germany claimed responsibility for, during a campaign in Berlin where there were also posters with Möbus' face and personal information put up, and graffiti with messages against him and the label. When released from the last prison sentence, Möbus appeared on stage during a neo-Nazi event, although did not play anything.

=== 1999–present: Post-incarceration ===
The band Absurd has continued in existence since 1999, going through many changes of personnel, and losing all of its original members. The main line-up features Wolf, Hendrik's brother, handling vocals and Sven "Unhold" Zimper handling the instruments, with Sebastian Schauseil performing the occasional clean vocal part on releases such as Asgardsrei (1999), Werwolfthron (2001), and Totenlieder (2002). Wolf and Unhold also released further albums as a duo; Blutgericht (2005), Der fünfzehnjährige Krieg (2008) and Weltenfeind (2009), a split with Grand Belial's Key (whom Unhold joined as a vocalist) and Sigrblot. Schauseil is still involved with the underground metal scene; he performed between 1999 and 2004 with the folk-influenced nationalist band Halgadom, the black metal project Wolfsmond (also featuring bassplayer Unhold, who played drums in Absurd), and the neofolk band In Acht und Bann. In 2002, Pantheon (USA) released a tribute album to Möbus, called Jarl die Freiheit ('Freedom to Jarl').

In 2017 Hendrik Möbus assembled a lineup to perform live as Absurd at Asgardsrei festival, neither Wolf nor Unhold authorized the performances. In 2019, Gelal Necrosodomy of Arghoslent and Grand Belial's Key joined Wolf's version of the band and was featured in the EP's Pure Darkness (2020) and Grabgesang (2021), Wolf performed vocals in the latter EP but has since left the band permanently to focus on a different project. In 2022, Hendrik Möbus released a new album as Absurd, titled Schwarze Bande, and both his version and Unhold's version are separately claiming to be the "real band".

In 2019, Hendrik Möbus was confronted by parts of the audience during a concert in Denmark. A fight erupted and Möbus was attacked by a group of unidentified people from the audience who left the concert afterwards, but returned and threw pepper spray at Möbus, which interrupted the show for a while.

== Band members ==
=== Unhold's Absurd ===
- Unhold (Sven Zimper) – bass, drums, guitar, vocals (1999–2012, 2019–)
- Gelal (Alexander Halac) – guitar (2019–)

=== JFN's Absurd ===
- JFN (Hendrik Möbus) – drums (1992–1994, 1998–1999) vocals (2017–)
- Widar (Markus Hartmann) - guitar (2020–)
- Leichenaar - bass (2020–)
- KPS - drums (2020–)

=== Past members ===
- C. H. Surt (Andreas Kirchner) – bass (1992–1994)
- Damien Thorn (Udo H.) – bass, guitar (1992)
- Dark Mark Doom (Sebastian Förster, né Schauseil) – bass, guitar, vocals (1992–1994, 1998–1999)
- Wolf (Ronald Möbus) – vocals (1992–1994, 1999–2012, 2019, 2021)
- Tormentor – bass, guitar (2004)
- Thorns (Martin Göring) – drums (2017–2019)
- Ansuz – guitar (2017–2018)
- Vinzent – guitar (2017–2018)
- Deimos – guitar (2017–2019)

== Musical style ==
The demos and the first album Facta Loquuntur have strong Oi! and Rock Against Communism (RAC) influences. Their musical idols were heavy metal bands like Mercyful Fate/King Diamond, Manowar, Danzig and especially horror punk band Der Fluch, a band covered by Absurd on both Der fünfzehnjährige Krieg and the split release Weltenfeind, whereas the Scandinavian bands were no significant musical or lyrical influence. On the other hand, the band called itself a black metal band from the very beginning; in an interview with the student magazine at his school, Hendrik Möbus claim Absurd would play the hardest, rawest and most ingenious black metal in Germany. Michael Moynihan and Didrik Søderlind classified the band's early recordings "more akin to '60s garage punk than some of the [...] Black Metal of their contemporaries", and according to Christian Dornbusch and Hans-Peter Killguss, the second demo Death from the Forest had no similarities to black metal, neither of the first nor the second wave, but was rather a mixture of primitive hard rock and punk rock elements. Due to its musical dilettantism, the band was not taken seriously by black metallers for a long time. In an ad in Sub Line magazine, the same demo was praised as "unholy, hard guitar rock, wild and boisterous; for all the dark souls out there" ("unheiliger, harter Gitarrenrock, wild und ungestüm; für all die schwarzen Seelen dort draußen"). The Mansion of Metal site classified it as "essentially crappy punk rock/RAC" and claimed the Thuringian Pagan Madness demo to have black metal influences.

Hendrik Möbus called the Asgardsrei EP the band's first holistic piece of work, with adjusted concept and layout, representing the band's step away from its former musical dilettantism; however, he still described some of it as dilettante, and Ronald Möbus criticised the final mixing.

== Discography ==
=== Demos ===
- Eternal Winter (1992)
- God's Death (1992)
- Death from the Forest (1993)
- Sadness (1993)
- Out of the Dungeon (1994)
- Ubungsraum (1994)
- Thuringian Pagan Madness (1995)
- Sonnenritter (1999)

=== Albums ===
- Facta Loquuntur (No Colours, 1996)
- Werwolfthron (Nebelfee Klangwerke, 2001)
- Totenlieder (Nebelfee Klangwerke / World Terror Committee, 2003)
- Blutgericht (Nebelfee Klangwerke / World Terror Committee, 2005)
- Der Fünfzehnjährige Krieg (Nebelklang Klangwerke / World Terror Committee, 2008)
- Schwarze Bande (Darker Than Black, 2022)
- Werwolflicht (Weltenfeind, 2024)

=== EPs/splits ===
- God's Death / Sadness (self-released, 1994)
- Totenburg / Die Eiche split with Heldentum (Burznazg / Silencelike Death, 1997)
- Asgardsrei EP (IG Farben, 1999)
- Wolfskrieger/Galdur Vikodlaks split with Pantheon (Nebelfee Klangwerke, 2002)
- Raubritter EP (Nebelfee Klangwerke, 2004)
- Ein kleiner Vorgeschmack single (Nebelfee Klangwerke, 2005)
- Grimmige Volksmusik EP (Nebelfee Klangwerke, 2005)
- Raubritter / Grimmige Volksmusik (Darker Than Black, 2007)
- Weltenfeind split with Grand Belial's Key and Sigrblot (WTC, 2008)
- Größer als der Tod EP (Darker Than Black, 2014)
- Thuringian Pagan Madmen split with Dark Fury, Barad Dûr and Goatmoon (self-released, 2020)
- Pure Darkness EP (Weltenfeind, 2020)
- Grabgesang EP (Weltenfeind, 2021)
- Welcome to the Anarchy split with Abyssic Hate (Darker Than Black, 2022)
- Berserks of the Asgardsrei split with Evil (Darker Than Black, 2022)
- Sieben Tage des Feuers / Tối nay chúng ta sẽ đến split with Vothana (Darker Than Black, 2022)
- Vigilante EP (Darker Than Black, 2023)
- Das Heer aus dem Dunkel EP (Darker Than Black, 2023)
- Kyffhäuserreich / Der Kaiser in dem Berge (Weltenfeind / Hammerbund, 2024)

== See also ==
- National Socialist black metal
