= Brigade M =

Dutch right-wing band

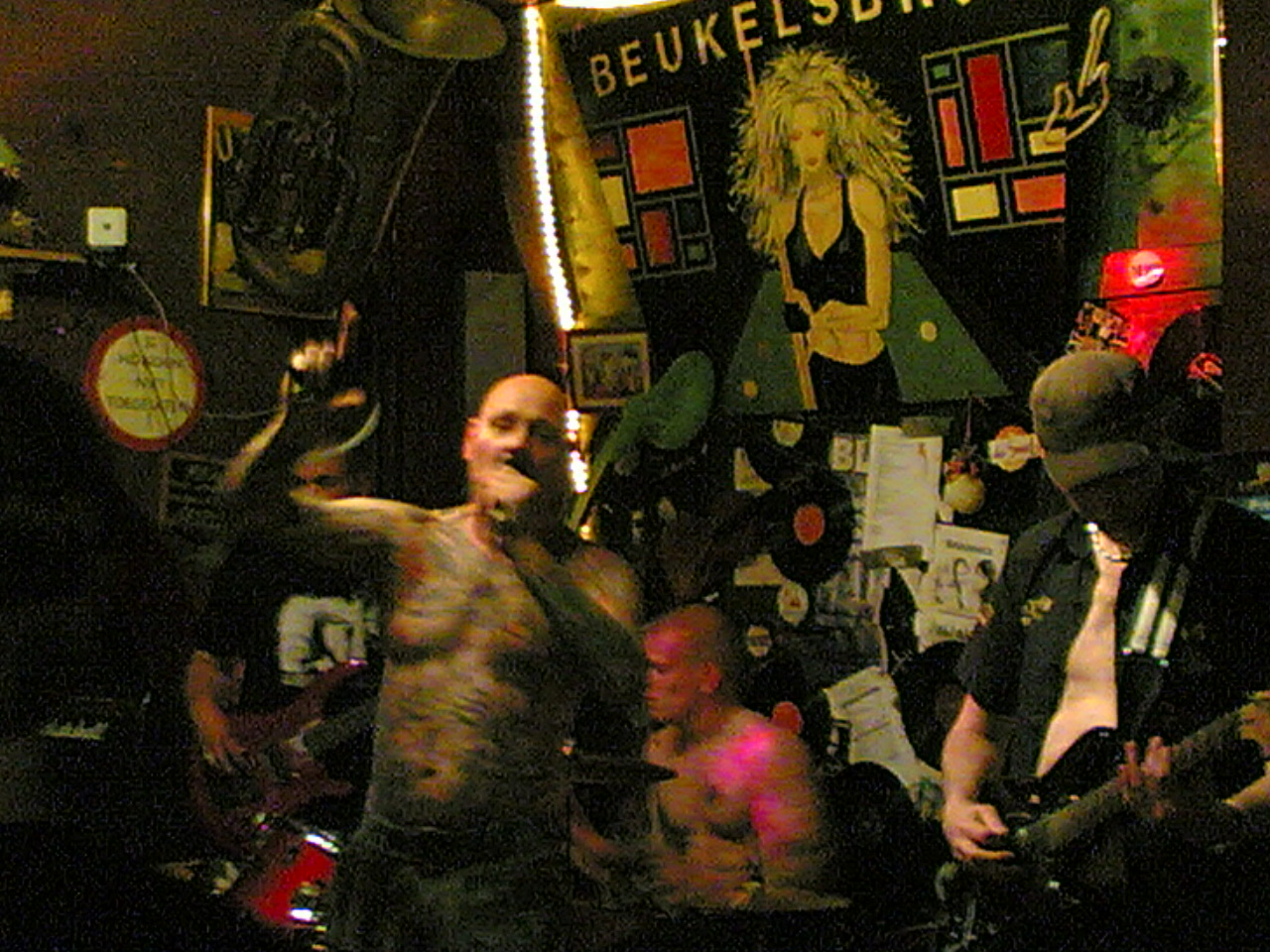
- Brigade M in 2009

Background information
- Origin: Sassenheim, Netherlands
- Genres: Rock Against Communism; punk rock
- Years active: 1995–2010
- Members: Tim Mudde (singer); Mike (guitar); Tom (bass); Jasper Velzel (drums)
- Website: nationaalrevolutionair.com

Brigade M (Dutch pronunciation: [briˈɣaːdə ˈʔɛm]) was a Dutch punk rock white power band from Sassenheim in the Bollenstreek district of the Netherlands that was heavily associated with the right-wing nationalist Rock Against Communism movement. During its existence, the driving force behind Brigade M was Tim Mudde.

The band was founded in 1995 out of the ashes of the hardcore band Opel Kadeath. Initially, the band's set list was limited, and there were only a few concerts held. Only a few years after the founding of the band, Europe had an upsurge in far-right extremism that broadened the appeal of the band.

Under the name "Dirk", they began rehearsing in the Muziekhuis in Leiden. Several leftist groups began to protest against their stay, but Alderman Alexander Pechtold decided though to let the group continue as there were no legal means to deny them. Brigade M later thanked him by composing the song "Pechtold Houzee ("Hail Pechtold!").

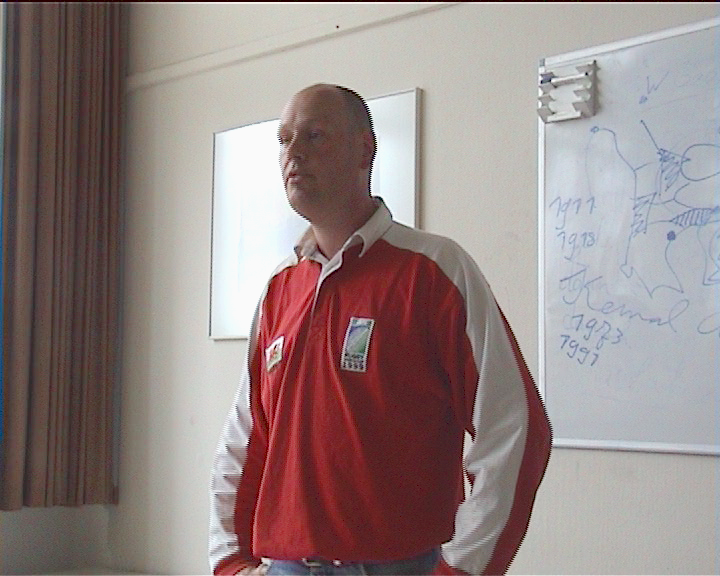
Tim Mudde in 2004

In 2003, the two members of Brigade M with the most extreme ideologies were kicked out of the band by Mudde, and afterwards Brigade M became more moderate right. National Socialism was toned down and National Bolshevism, Strasserism, metapolitics, people's nationalism, language purism, European unity and conservative criticism of society became the fundaments of the band. They also highlighted vegetarianism, alcoholism, fast food, the antifa (most notably with their song "Lui, laf en lelijk", better known for the lyrics "Antifa, ha, ha, ha") and the Arab–Israeli conflict (in which they side with the Palestinians) in their lyrics, which they themselves called "radical and nationalistic". Their music frequently attacked hip-hop fans.

They later promoted a pan-European unity through their music, rather than inter-European territorial conflicts. The band was dissolved in 2005 after their last CD Nationaal Revolutionair, claiming that their national-revolutionary ideas didn't get much credence with the nationalistic subcultures in Europe as most nationalists were "too chauvinist". Afterwards, the band sporadically reformed for concerts during special occasions until 2010.

The band was defunct by 2013.

Anton Shekhovtsov identified them as the Netherlands' "most productive" far-right band.

== Discography ==
- Holland (2001; MCD)
- Boykot McDood (2002; 7")
- Diets-Deutsche Kameraden (2003; Split CD with Stromschlag and Schutt und Asche)
- Trouw aan Rood, Wit, Blauw (2003; CD)
- Ode aan de kazerne (2003; 7")
- Dutch Hungarian brotherhood (2003; Split CD with Fehér Törvény)
- Nationaal-Revolutionair (2006; CD)
  - Also simultaneously released in German and English versions as Nationalrevolutionär and National Revolutionary respectively.
