= Honor (band) =

Polish musical group

Background information
- Origin: Poland
- Genres: RAC; pagan metal
- Years active: 1989–2005, 2014–present
- Members: Olaf Jasiński; Robert Krakowski
- Past members: Mariusz Szczerski

Honor was a Polish Rock Against Communism (RAC) band. Their lyrical themes are related to national socialism, neopaganism and the white power skinhead movement. Until 1999, the band played typical RAC, and then moved to pagan metal music. In January 2002, vocalist Mariusz Szczerski was arrested for spreading neo-Nazism and antisemitism. After his death from a car accident in 2005, the band stopped playing. The band reformed in 2015 and has played since, albeit in the previous RAC style. Honor is on the Anti-Defamation League List of Hate Music Groups.

== Former members ==
- Olaf Jasiński – guitar, bass
- Mariusz "Szczery" Szczerski – vocals
- Piotr Marcinowski – drums
- Janusz Filipowski – drums
- Karol Cegliński – bass

=== Session musicians ===
- Robert "Rob Darken" Fudali – keyboards
- Paweł "Stormblast" Pietrzak – drums during shows
- Zyklon – bass during shows

== Discography ==
Year	Title	Type
1991	Biały Front	Album
1992	Cena Idei	Album
1993	Urodzony Białym	Album
1993	W dzień triumfu nad złem	Album
1994	Oi! Dla Ojczyzny Vol.1	Compilation
1994	Stal zemsty	Album
1995	Droga bez odwrotu	Album
1995	Skinheads	Compilation
1998	Ogień ostatniej bitwy	Album
1999	To Survive for Victory 1989-1999 Vol. 1	Album
1999	To Survive for Victory 1989-1999 Vol. 2	Album
2000	W płomieniach wschodzącej siły	Album
2000	Raiders of Revenge	Collaborative
2001	Day of the Rope Vol.1	Compilation
2001	For All White Nationalists	Collaborative
2001	Honor	EP
2001	W dzień triumfu nad złem	Reedition
2002	Głos Słowiańskiej Dumy vol.1	Album
2002	In the Flames of Rising Power	Album
2004	Urodzony Białym	Reedition
2004	The Fire of the Final Battle	Reedition
2006	Live Unplugged	Live
2007	Na szubienicę / Sanhedryn	Single
2009	Dwadzieścia lat pod sztandarem Orła 1989–2009	Album
2010	20.01.1991	Live
2011	Urodzony w dzień triumfu	Compilation
2012	Przetrwać by zwyciężyć 1989-1999	Compilation
2014	Biały front - White Deluxe	Album
2016	Impuls '89	Album
2020	1989-2019	Box set

== See also ==
- Far-right politics in Poland
