= Kolovrat (band) =

Russian Rock Against Communism band

Kolovrat (Russian: Коловрат) is a Russian Rock Against Communism (RAC) thrash metal band. The band has a cult following among Russian nationalists and has been described as "famous" in the RAC scene and is the best known of the Russian white power bands. It has been described as a neo-Nazi band.

The band was founded in 1994, in Moscow by Fedor Volkov and his friends. Denis Gerasimov is a frontman of the group from 2000 on. Originally called Russkoe Getto (Russian: Русское гетто, Russian Ghetto), they changed their name to Kolovrat in the autumn of 1997.

On November 4, 2009, the band played openly for the first time in the center of Moscow, at the Bolotnaya Square as part of the yearly "Russian March".
