= Endstufe =

Far-right German rock band from Bremen

- Origin: Bremen, Germany
- Genres: Rechtsrock (far right or neo-Nazi rock)
- Years active: 1981–present
- Members: Jens Brandt (vocals, guitar); Christian (guitar); Carsten Löhmann (drums)
- Website: www.endstufebremen.de

Endstufe (lit. 'Final stage') is a German far-right rock band from Bremen.

Formed in the early 1980s, it was one of the first skinhead bands in Germany and since the beginning of 2001 is the longest-running German rechtsrock or skinhead band.

== History ==
The band was formed in 1981 by the band's singer and frontman Jens Brandt.

The first lineup, centered around singer Brandt, came together in the Bremen district of Findorff in 1981—back then, they went by the name "H20." In 1982, the band played in their school auditorium, but teachers cut the performance short after just three songs. Five years later, in 1987, they released their first record under the name "Endstufe."

Since the first years, the members of the band have changed constantly. By 2026 only Jens Brandt is a founding member. Christian Guitarist Schröer began his musical career within the Endstufe orbit in the 1990s, initially as a fill-in musician, before becoming a permanent member of the band in 2006.

In 2013, Endstufe performed at a neo-Nazi festival in Nienhagen. In 2021, the band released what is, for the time being, their final album, titled "40 Jahre" (40 Years).

In 2023 the members were twice issued travel bans preventing them from leaving the country.

== Lyrics ==
Because the lyrics were crudely far-right, the band’s recordings were indexed (restricted) and confiscated.

"In die Eier" ("In the Balls") is one of their hits within that subculture. In the song "Skinhead," Brandt sings: "You come home from work, take off your dirty work boots, and slip into your Doc Martens—because you’re proud to be German. ... I’m a skinhead, obviously and I think I’m just wonderful. I can’t stand communism, and I love punching punks in the face — Oi!"

== Discography ==
=== Albums ===
- Gruß an Deutschland (MC, Eigenvertrieb, 1984)
- A Way of Life (MC, Eigenvertrieb, 1986) (contains the complete MC Gruß an Deutschland and some new recordings)
- Der Clou (LP/CD, Rock-O-Rama, 1987) — "indexed" as harmful to young persons
- Skinhead Rock'N'Roll (LP/CD, Rock-O-Rama, 1990) — indexed as harmful to young persons
- Allzeit bereit (split with Volksgemurmel) (LP/CD, Rock-O-Rama, 1990) — indexed as harmful to young persons and confiscated
- Glatzenparty (Doppel LP/CD, Rock-O-Rama, 1993)
- Schütze deine Kinder (CD, Rock-O-Rama, 1994)
- Raritäten 1983–1994 (CD, Rock-O-Rama, 1994) — indexed as harmful to young persons
- Der Tod ist überall (CD, Hanse Records, 1996), (LP, Dim Records, 2006)
- Live auf Mallorca '98 (CD, Hanse Records, 1998)
- 9698 (CD, Hanse Records, 1999)
- Mit den Jungs auf Tour (CD, Hanse Records, 2000)
- Feuer Frei (LP/CD, Dim Records, 2006)
- Wir sind keine Engel (split CD with Last Riot) (Dim Records, 2007)
- Live (Wo wir sind brennt die Luft) (CD, Pure Impact Records, 2009)
- Steht auf! (CD, Pure Impact Records, 2013)

=== Singles/MCD ===
- Deutschland, wir stehen zu Dir (tätoowiert, kahl, brutal) (7", Rock-O-Rama, 1990)
- Schenk noch einen ein (Deutschland, wir stehn zu dir) (7", Rock-O-Rama, 1990)
- Die Welt gehörte uns (MCD, Rock-O-Rama, 1995)
- Auf die Ohren Vol. 1 (split EP with Kampfzone) (7", self-produced, 2007)
