= Steelfest =

Finnish black metal music festival

Steelfest Open Air
- Genre: Black metal
- Dates: Mid-May
- Locations: Hyvinkää, Finland
- Years active: 2012–2019, 2022–present
- Founders: Jani Laine
- Website: steelfest.fi

Steelfest Open Air is an annual black metal music festival located in Hyvinkää, Finland, 60 kilometres north of Helsinki. Founded by Jani Laine, the first edition occurred in 2012.

It traditionally took place over two days in May at the Villatehdas venue from 2012 to 2019 before being halted by the COVID-19 pandemic. Upon its return, it became a four-day event in 2022 and a three-day event in 2023.

In recent years, the festival has become controversial over its frequent presence of National Socialist black metal bands.

== History ==
Founder Jani Laine organised his first metal concert in 2008 to a small crowd. In 2012, Laine and his network of promoters put together the first Steelfest, held in the Villatehdas (Wool Factory) in Hyvinkää, Finland on 18 and 19 May. It featured bands such as Entombed, Goatmoon, Impaled Nazarene, Satanic Warmaster, The Crown and Taake. Laine estimates that the first edition of Steelfest lost €45,000, owing to the cost of factors such as stage management salaries and booking respectable airline flights for the bands.

In 2013, the festival attracted larger names such as Mayhem and Sodom while highlighting local Finnish bands including Horna, Satanic Warmaster and Goatmoon. Laine did not approve of every booking during the festival's early years, but four members of Steelfest's management team left in a negotiation settlement after 2014, and Laine, in his words, "assumed total command" of the festival beginning with the 2015 edition.

Dark Funeral, playing The Secrets of the Black Arts in its entirety, headlined 2015, with bands such as Nokturnal Mortum, Asphyx, Satanic Warmaster and Sargeist rounding out the lineup. Possessed were supposed to headline in 2016, but the band had to back out a few months before the festival, so Laine named Blasphemy, 1349, Gorgoroth and Graveland as headliners instead. It was the first Steelfest to sell out all tickets. The 2017 edition was headlined by Marduk – playing its 1996 album Heaven Shall Burn... When We Are Gathered in full, Peste Noire and Carpathian Forest. During a collaboration between Finnish black metal band Ride for Revenge and power electronics project Bizarre Uproar, a musician defecated on another performer, and the feces was thrown into the crowd.

Encouraged by the strong sales of Steelfest, Laine started a second smaller winter festival named SteelChaos in 2017, held in Helsinki proper at the Nosturi venue from 10 to 11 November. The first SteelChaos was headlined by Master's Hammer, Nifelheim and Deströyer 666.

Steelfest 2018 was headlined by Mortiis, Watain and Tormentor. In 2019, attendance increased to nearly 6,000 ticket holders from 55 different countries. Headliners were Marduk performing 1999's Panzer Division Marduk in full and Mysticum. It was the first year where the revenue earned from the festival was enough for Laine to pay back his debts from running previous editions at a loss.

The 2020 and 2021 editions were cancelled following the COVID-19 pandemic. Steelfest resumed in 2022 with two additional days, making it a four-day event from 12 to 15 May. The 2022 edition was mired in controversy, as a significant portion of its original lineup cancelled their appearances over rising tensions regarding Steelfest's Nazi associations.

Steelfest 2023 took place over three days from 19 to 21 May and was headlined by Marduk, Carpathian Forest and Nokturnal Mortum.

== Nazism controversies ==
Before the inaugural Steelfest in 2012, people whom Steelfest founder Jani Laine described as a "deranged SJW sect" demanded that the festival cancel Impaled Nazarene's appearance due to the band's far-right political affiliations and lyrics promoting homophobia and rape. Since then, Laine's mantra for booking Steelfest artists is: "There is no room for such concerns when I decide the line-up; the best bands will be booked, not those who are ‘woke’ enough."

In 2019, Finnish anti-fascist activists began to criticise Steelfest for its consistent hosting of National Socialist black metal (NSBM) bands, as well as working with record labels and stores which are affiliated with NSBM and the Finnish far right. It also unearthed photographs of the Steelfest crowd performing Nazi salutes during the 2013 edition. In response, Laine decried Steelfest critics as "our local SJW network".

=== 2022 mass cancellations ===
Following the release of the 2022 lineup, Laine claims that an industry insider emailed him asking him if he would rather be a "reliable, trustworthy promoter in the 'normal' extreme metal world, or operate in the 'forbidden zone'" regarding his booking of NSBM bands. Artists singled out by insiders as inappropriate included Graveland, Archgoat and Horna.

On 2 September 2021, Swiss black metal band Samael posted on Facebook upon the reveal of the full 2022 lineup that "some of the new bands that are announced are mainly using the music to give a platform to promote extreme political views that we don't support" and gave Laine an ultimatum to remove NSBM-affiliated bands from the roster in order to "distance ourselves from extreme political views that go against everything we stand for." The next day, Samael announced their departure from the lineup.

On 3 September, Sodom announced that they would no longer perform at Steelfest "solely on the basis of our own conviction," after initially expressing a desire to stay on the lineup, citing "freedom of expression". Havukruunu cancelled on 4 September, explaining that "We agreed to play Steelfest already in 2019, with no clue that it would turn into right out nazi-bullshit and turned a music festival into a shitshow of controversy."

On 6 September, Moonsorrow also cancelled, stating "We have always wanted to disassociate ourselves from any political movements, including but not limited to those at the far right ... We do not wish to attend any political playgrounds, and this seems to be becoming one with an accelerating pace."

Days after several bands dropped out, the entire lineup was taken down from the festival's website. In a December 2021 interview, Laine said that of the 50-something bands on the original lineup, roughly 35 were still planned to play.
