= Asgardsrei festival =

National Socialist black metal rock music festival held in Ukraine

Asgardsrei
- Genre: National Socialist black metal
- Locations: Moscow, Russia (2012–2013); Kyiv, Ukraine (2014–present)
- Years active: 2012–present
- Founders: Alexey Levkin
- Organized by: Militant Zone

Asgardsrei festival (Norwegian: 'The Ride of Asgard', i.e "The Wild Hunt") is an annual National Socialist black metal (NSBM) festival in Kyiv, Ukraine.

As a NSBM and white power music festival, it is one of the most popular events for far-right and neo-Nazi extremists and a meeting ground for white supremacist networks and organizations across Europe and America. Several of the organizers and bands regularly playing at the club Bingo during Asgardsrei festival have been convicted of murders, assaults and other hate crimes, and belong to organizations classified as terrorist groups by several European courts. It is named after the mythological Oskorei, also known as the Wild Hunt, which also was the name of a 1999 album by Absurd, which was seen as influential to the National Socialist black metal scene. Bands that have participated in the festival include Absurd, Peste Noire, Goatmoon, M8L8TH, and Nokturnal Mortum.

The festival is strongly connected to Alexey Levkin of М8Л8ТХ, and his "Militant Zone" label, who act as organizers and originally founded the festival in Moscow in 2012. Levkin and the Militant Zone used to be heavily involved in the Ukrainian nationalist Azov Brigade and are now in the paramilitary Russian Volunteer Corps.
