= National Socialist black metal =

Subgenre of black metal promoting Nazism

- Stylistic origins: Black metal; pagan metal; Rock Against Communism; Nazi punk
- Cultural origins: 1990s, Europe

Other topics
- List of NSBM artists; White power skinhead

National Socialist black metal (also known as NSBM or Nazi black metal) is a movement within the black metal music genre that promotes neo-Nazism, neo-fascism, and white supremacist ideologies. NSBM artists typically combine neo-Nazi imagery and ideology with modern paganism, Satanism, or Nazi occultism, and vehemently oppose Judaism, Christianity, and Islam from a racialist viewpoint. According to Mattias Gardell, NSBM musicians see their ideology as "a logical extension of the political and spiritual dissidence inherent in black metal". NSBM artists are a small minority within black metal. While many black-metallers boycott NSBM artists, others are indifferent or say they appreciate the music without supporting the musicians. Like Nazi punk, Nazi black metal is not seen as a distinct genre, being "distinguished only by ideology, not musical character".

NSBM artists do not always convey their political beliefs in their music but may express their beliefs in interviews or imagery. Artists who hold far-right beliefs but do not express them in their music are not considered NSBM by many black-metallers, but they may be considered NSBM by outsiders. War and catastrophe are common themes in black metal, and some bands have made references to Nazi Germany for shock value, much like some punk rock and heavy metal bands.

The emergence of NSBM in the mid-1990s is linked with the prominent Norwegian black metal musician Varg Vikernes. After his imprisonment for church burning and murder, he developed his anti-Christian beliefs into an increasingly white nationalist and neo-Nazi form of Heathenry. The first black metal bands to have neo-Nazi lyrics and imagery were German band Absurd, and Polish bands Infernum and Graveland. In the United States, Grand Belial's Key and Judas Iscariot became involved in NSBM (the latter has since distanced themselves from the movement). As NSBM grew internationally, it started to overlap with existing white power music such as Rock Against Communism, hatecore, and the far-right faction of Oi!. The neo-Nazi record label Resistance Records, associated with the National Alliance, started releasing NSBM albums and even purchased Vikernes' label Cymophane Records. In 2012, the NSBM Asgardsrei festival was established in Moscow, Russia, and then in 2014 relocated to Kyiv, Ukraine.

== Black metal ==
Black metal is generally not political music and the vast majority of bands do not express political views. Black metal originated in the 1980s from the work of thrash metal bands such as Venom (whose 1982 album Black Metal coined the term), Mercyful Fate, Bathory, Slayer, Hellhammer, Celtic Frost, and Sodom. These bands did not form a scene of their own, nor did they have a common musical style. A lyrical focus that is anti-Christian, Satanist, neopagan, or a combination thereof, is often considered a prerequisite for the genre, and originally the term "black metal" was synonymous with "Satanic metal". A stricter definition still requires Satanism for a band to be classified as black metal. Non-Satanic bands from the same surroundings originally used other terms for their own music, such as pagan metal or Viking metal. In the late-1980s and early-1990s, the early Norwegian black metal scene, developed by bands such as Mayhem, Thorns, Immortal, Darkthrone, Burzum, Emperor, Satyricon, and Ulver, established a more specific sonic template that came to define Norwegian black metal and subsequently a great part of black metal in general, although other styles of black metal, like war metal, still exist. Common traits of Norwegian black metal include a fast tempo, blast beats and double-bass drumming, a thin, shrieking vocal style, heavily distorted guitars played with tremolo picking and power chords, either lo-fi or well-produced recordings, an emphasis on atmosphere, and an "unholy" aesthetic. Keyboards are sometimes used, as are elements of neoclassical, folk, and ambient music. Artists often appear in corpse paint and adopt pseudonyms. Many black metal artists prefer to be underground, inaccessible to the mainstream, and even intentionally push away audiences and demonstrate anti-social behavior.

== History ==
=== Origins in the Norwegian black metal scene ===
In the early 1990s, the early Norwegian black metal scene developed black metal into a distinct genre. The scene members were fiercely anti-Christian—most generally presented themselves as misanthropic devil-worshipers who wanted to spread hatred, sorrow and evil, though some wrote about pre-Christian Scandinavia and its mythology. Among some members of the scene, the antagonism toward Christianity turned violent, and arson and attempted arson was perpetrated against a number of churches from 1992 through 1995. Among the perpetrators were Varg Vikernes of Burzum and Mayhem, Euronymous of Mayhem, Samoth of Thou Shalt Suffer and Emperor, Faust of Thorns and Jørn Inge Tunsberg of Old Funeral, Immortal, and Hades Almighty, some of whom are among the most prominent musicians in the scene. In January 1993, Vikernes spoke with a journalist from Bergens Tidende. The loft where the interview was conducted was filled with Satanist and Nazi paraphernalia, along with weapons, and Vikernes declared he was at war with Christianity, had already burned eight churches, and would continue his terrorism.

The violence and misanthropy in the scene also included murder. In August 1992, Faust killed a gay man—Magne Andreassen—who had propositioned him in Lillehammer. Faust was not caught for a year, despite his actions being an open secret known to many in the scene. Many have attributed the murder to homophobia; however, Gaahl, a vocalist from the band Gorgoroth, later came out as an openly gay man who was voted Gay Person of the Year in 2010 in Bergen, expressed belief that the killing of Andreassen by Faust had nothing to do with Andreassen's sexuality. Likewise, Faust himself, along with bandmate Ihsahn, have claimed that Andreassen's sexuality was irrelevant, and Faust simply had a murderous impulse. In August 1993, Vikernes, with Snorre Ruch from Thorns and Mayhem as an accomplice, killed his bandmate Euronymous and was arrested shortly after. Vikernes was convicted in the spring of 1994 for arson, murder, and illegal possession of weapons. Vikernes insists that he killed Euronymous in self-defense, although while in prison, he claimed that it was also because Euronymous was gay and communist. Euronymous was interested in communism, even professing to be a Stalinist in 1992, and in the 1980s had participated in the Marxist–Leninist youth group Rød Ungdom, which he later disavowed, but there is no evidence that he was a gay man. Despite Vikernes' later claims, the killing is not believed to have been politically motivated, which even Vikernes claimed at first, and is generally thought to have been because of a personal dispute.

There is an undercurrent of Romantic or ethnic nationalism in black metal, and racism is not uncommon in the scene, even though most black metal and other extreme metal musicians disavow neo-Nazism and racist ideology. Within the Scandinavian scene, several musicians made racist statements and utilized Nazi language and paraphernalia—yet black metal is also highly performative, intentionally contradictory, and artistically transgressive, and some musicians cultivate an evil, ultra-right-wing image as an aesthetic. Many of the artists who flirted with fascism, totalitarianism, and violence in their artistic themes did not find a political connection with that imagery. Still, a minority in the scene, in their opposition to Christianity and reverence for a pre-Christian past, stepped into fascist and racist ideas, particularly Nazi occultism. Euronymous, in a personal letter in the early 1990s, made the sweeping claim that "Almost ALL Norwegian bands are more less nazis [sic]. Burzum, Mayhem, Emperor, Arcturus, Enslaved, you name them." Similarly, scholar Kirsten Dyck has described the Norwegian scene's "Black Circle" as neo-Nazi. According to her, the Black Circle melded Nazi occultism, anti-Semitism and the conspiracy theory of a Jewish plot for world domination, homophobia, and xenophobia with Nietzschean philosophy, Satanism, and Scandinavian neopaganism, which then contributed to the violence perpetrated by some of the musicians.

In 1994, Hellhammer, the drummer for the Norwegian band Mayhem, said of the genre's links with racism: "I'll put it this way, we don't like black people here. Black Metal is for white people". When Mayhem reformed after Euronymous's death, they began releasing merchandise bearing World War II-era Nazi symbols. However, in a later interview, Hellhammer said, "I don't give a crap if the fans are white, black, green, yellow, or blue. For me music and politics don't go hand in hand". In 1995, Gaahl described "niggers" and "mulattoes" as "subhuman" and stated his admiration for Vikernes and Adolf Hitler. However, he too has since distanced himself from these statements. Vikernes also wrote some lyrics for the album Transilvanian Hunger by Darkthrone, another key band in the Norwegian scene. It was released in 1994 with Norsk Arisk Black Metal ("Norwegian Aryan Black Metal") printed on the back cover, and issued a press release stating, "If any man should attempt to criticize this LP, he should be thoroughly patronized for his obviously Jewish behavior." After the ensuing controversy, Darkthrone claimed that "Jew" is simply a Norwegian word for "stupid" and that they were "not a Nazi band nor a political band". In a 2007 documentary, bandmember Fenriz claimed he was once arrested while participating in an anti-apartheid demonstration and later had a "phase of being really angry with ... other races" before he became "totally unengaged in [political] shit". Scholar Keith Kahn-Harris argues that it is almost impossible to believe that Darkthrone did not know that a pejorative use of the word "Jew" was offensive, and the denials from Darkthrone that the members had racist or fascist sympathies was disingenuous, given the statements made. But Kahn-Harris also notes that Fenriz has made more jocular references to racism and fascism, and has interacted well with black metal enthusiasts from Israel, so Kahn-Harris believes that the actions by Darkthrone were intentionally contradictory as a form of transgressive artistic discourse and not expressions of a sincere ideology. Axl Rosenberg from the website MetalSucks notes that after these offensive actions from the band in the mid-1990s, Darkthrone has not repeatedly demonstrated racist behavior. He opines that the band members are far older now and that "it’s feasible their worldviews have changed; it’s feasible they were being provocative for the sake of being provocative when they made Hunger and have since seen the error of such sophomoric behavior." After his release from prison, Faust stated regarding the arson and murder he committed that "I was never a Satanist or fascist in any way, but I put behind me the hatred and negativity. Those feelings just eat you up from inside."

Similar statements were also uttered by scene members from other countries. Michael W. Ford of the American band Black Funeral mentioned that Nazi occultism was very important to him, called his former band Sorath his "old SS Death squad" and claimed "you have to be white to play Black metal". He was the American leader of Cymophane, an organisation started by Vikernes. He would later disassociate himself from Nazism. According to the authors of Lords of Chaos, in 1995, three Swedish black-metallers (including Mika "Belfagor" Hakola of the band Nefandus) went on a "niggerhunt" in Linköping. Wielding an axe and two machetes, they "terrorized" a Black man. Nefandus were later "considered to be Nazi sympathizers", though Belfagor explained: "This could not be further from the truth, but I guess this has to do with some of the controversial comments I made in various magazines in my youth, when I still aspired to play in the most hated band in the world. I used a lot of provocative language back then. But to sort things out: I associate with people of all creeds and colours. ... So to be labeled a Nazi or a racist is very offensive to me".

Vikernes and his project Burzum are generally seen as the main catalyst in the development of the NSBM movement, although Burzum was never explicitly political. Although Vikernes has claimed to not be a neo-Nazi, he has participated in neo-Nazi activities and his statements have expressed neo-Nazi views and antagonism toward Muslims and Jews. According to an interview in Blood & Honour magazine, Vikernes contacted neo-Nazi organization Zorn 88 in 1992 and joined White Aryan Resistance before he killed Euronymous. While in prison, "Vikernes began to formulate his nationalist heathen ideology" and wrote a manifesto called Vargsmål. It became available on the Internet for a while in 1996, and in 1997, it was printed by a Norwegian publisher. Once imprisoned, Vikernes abandoned the black metal scene and started touting a neo-Nazi variety of Heathenry. According to Vikernes, he stopped playing metal music because of its origin as "Negro music", and argued that "the 'metal heads' tend to behave like a bunch of 'White Niggers', so to speak, with their sex, drugs and rock'n'roll culture." Vikernes also has claimed that the scene had begun "as a nationalistic (Norwegian-centric), racist and anti-Christian revolt" but was "hijacked" by the "Jew-dominated music industry". He claims the industry made it into another tool with which to destroy Europe, by promoting bands who embraced "everything sick and anti-European on this planet, from porn and promiscuity to drugs and homosexuality".

=== Development of National Socialist black metal ===
One of the first explicitly NSBM releases was the 1995 demo Thuringian Pagan Madness by German band Absurd. It was recorded while the members were imprisoned for murdering a boy from their school. On the demo cover is a photograph of his gravestone and the inlay contained pro-Nazi statements. Bandmember Hendrik Möbus stated that NSBM was the "logical conclusion" of the Norwegian black metal movement and interpreted the church burnings as a "cultural atavism". Other bands deemed to be part of the early NSBM scene include Graveland and Infernum, from Poland. Rob Darken of Graveland in particular was a very central figure in the development of NSBM in Poland. The burgeoning black metal scene in Poland was far more pronouncedly racist, and The Temple of Fullmoon, of which several Polish bands were members, turned into a far-right organization. Similar to what happened in Norway, the scene became increasingly violent, and three of the four members of the NSBM band Thunderbolt were imprisoned for arson and murder. According to Gunnar Sauermann, in the 1990s, some of the earliest American black metal bands—like Grand Belial's Key and Judas Iscariot—joined an international NSBM organization called the Pagan Front, although Judas Iscariot's sole member Akhenaten left the organization. Thelemnar, the drummer of German band Secrets of the Moon, said he got to know him "only as an intelligent person and never as a Nazi". The United States project I Shalt Become was another pioneer in the nascent NSBM scene. NSBM came to dominate the black metal scenes in Poland, Ukraine, and Russia.

In 2012, Alexey Levkin, frontman of the band M8l8th, along with others, started the NSBM music festival Asgardsrei in Moscow. The event is named after the 1999 album of the same name by Absurd. The festival was relocated to Kyiv in 2014 when Levkin and the other organizers relocated to Ukraine to join the Azov Battalion (a brigade now). Steelfest is a Finnish annual black metal festival that has been held since 2012. Steelfest is notorious for hosting a venue for National Socialist black metal bands, and bands and audience have done mass Nazi salutes.

== Ideology ==
NSBM typically melds neo-Nazi beliefs (such as fascism, white supremacy, white separatism, white nationalism, right-wing extremism, antisemitism, xenophobia, and ethnic separatism, with some national-anarchist tendencies and admiration of Adolf Hitler) with hostility to "foreign" religions. Bands often promote ethnic European paganism, occultism, or Satanism. Hendrik Möbus of Absurd described Nazism as the "most perfect (and only realistic!) synthesis of Satanic/Luciferian will to power, elitist Social Darwinism, connected to Aryan Germanic paganism". Members of the band Der Stürmer (named after the antisemitic newspaper edited by Julius Streicher) subscribe to Esoteric Nazism, leaning on the works of Savitri Devi and Julius Evola. Famine of Peste Noire stated in an interview that he prefers Italian Fascism instead of Nazism as an ideology.

=== Anti-Christianity and antisemitism ===
Typically, NSBM musicians regard Christianity as a product of an alleged Jewish conspiracy to undermine the Aryan race by eliminating their Artglauben and their "original" culture. These musicians usually reject the legitimacy of Christian antisemitism as well as the German Christians movement, which celebrated and promoted Nazi ideology in the context of an unorthodox Christian theological framework. Hjarulv Henker of the band Der Stürmer said:

I don't think that a dogma like Christianity has a place in Aryandom. There is no way to make Christianity fit into the Weltanschauung of the Aryan Overman. Christianity teaches humbleness, the loss of National and Racial identity, and equality, things alien to our cosmotheory. You cannot combine Jesus with characters who represent Aryan ethics. ... Christianity is Christianity and it is Jewish by its very birth and conception, a vehicle in the Jewish world domination and designed as such.

=== White supremacy ===
NSBM musicians such as Varg Vikernes of Burzum and Famine of Peste Noire have expressed a white supremacist concern about "race mixing" and preserving the purity of the white race and the traditional cultures of white European nations. Somewhat perplexingly, NSBM has been popular in Poland and other Slavic countries, despite the fact that, historically, German Nazis viewed Slavic people as subhuman racial inferiors and intended to eliminate them. This contradiction is either masked, relativized or excused as a historical mistake. A conspiracy theory says the Jews would have prevented an alliance between Nazi Germany and other Eastern European countries. Knjaz Varggoth, singer and guitarist of the Ukrainian band Nokturnal Mortum, gives the following explanation for the contradiction: "Goruth of the Russian band Temnozor sees the Slavs and Germans as a part of a Hyperborean Aryan race and nowadays differing due to its degeneration."

The Vietnamese-American band Vothana is unusual in that its members are not ethnically European; however, the band's lyrics (which are performed in Vietnamese) still express racialist and fascist viewpoints and the band has performed at festivals alongside NSBM bands.

=== Paganism ===
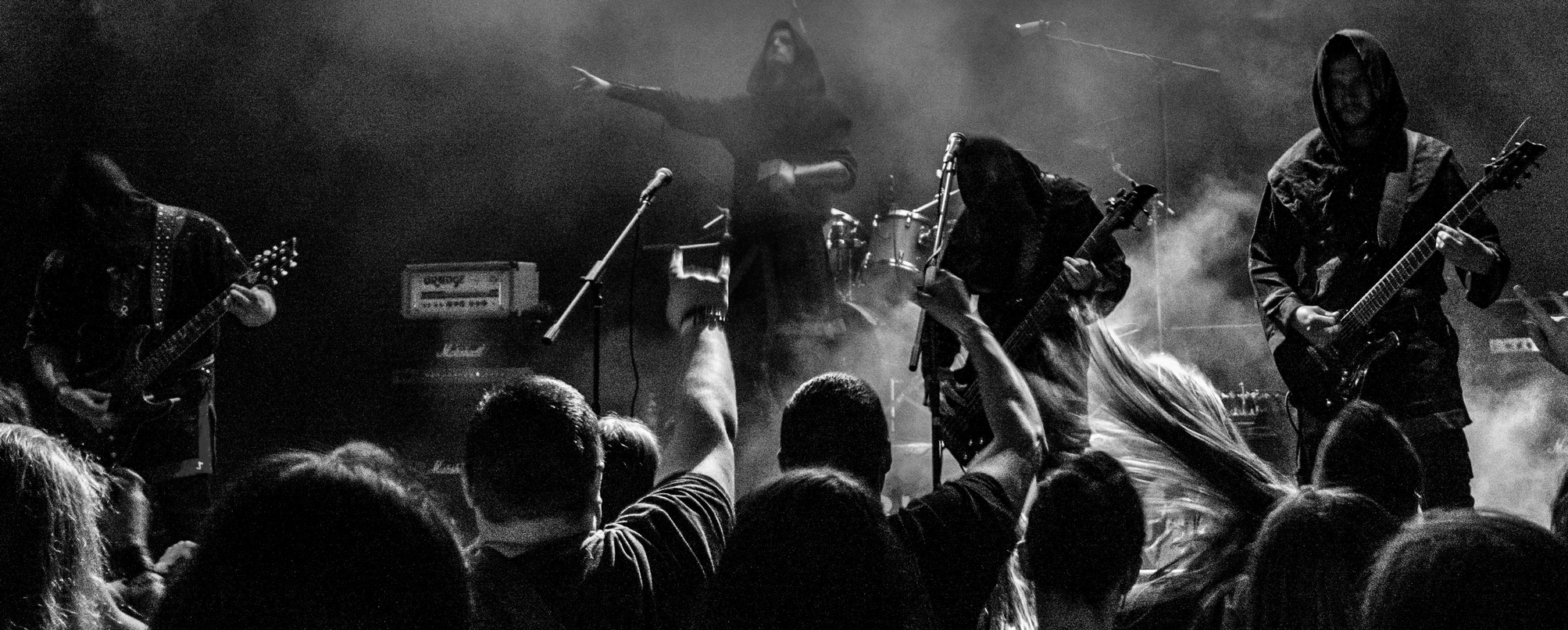
The pagan NSBM band Graveland in 2017

As part of their anti-Christianity, anti-Semitism, and the idea that white Europeans should return to their native ways, most NSBM bands promote ethnic European paganism. Benjamin Hedge Olson argues that NSBM is "indelibly linked with Asá Trŭ and opposed to Satanism, which gives it a 'blood and soil' attraction to many young Neo-Nazis looking for identity in their distant, ancestral past." Hendrik Möbus interpreted the church burnings in Norway as

[A] cultural atavism, a sudden and inexplicable plunge back into pre-Christian, medieval conditions in all but outward reality. Like the Swiss psychologist, Carl Gustav Jung, would have said: Ancient archetypes resurfaced from our collective unconscious and repossessed receptive minds – which were, as a rule, still developing and thus especially impressible. The thus affected teenagers found themselves with an archaic state of mind and like in a mass-hysteria, they induced their condition unto others. It goes without saying that a, say, 18 year old adolescent who suddenly felt out of tune with his environment lacked the insight for a self-analysis.

He argues that later on they would have realized the meaning of these emotions, begun to identify with paganism and taken "an active interest in Nationalist politics designed to preserve and to cultivate this very heritage". The booklet of the Absurd EP Asgardsrei depicts the Knights Templar, the Teutonic Order and the Waffen-SS as warriors of the "Asgardsrei", which the bands define as a term for an alleged godly and Germanic group of warriors.

=== Satanism ===
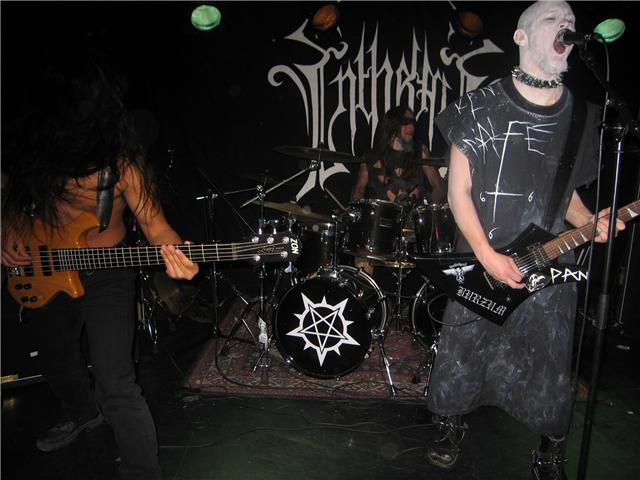
Peste Noire, a Satanist NSBM band

Besides pagan beliefs, part of the NSBM scene embraces an interpretation of Satanism. Satanism is a common theme even in apolitical black metal, but in NSBM, Satan is depicted as an ancient Aryan counterpart to YHWH, the god of the Jews and Christians. This view is often called "Völkisch Satanism" or "Aryan Satanism". Chraesvelgoron of The True Frost sees Nazism as the political appearance of Satanism and the collective deification of man as a social animal, as godliness instead of humaneness. His bandmate Sadorass calls the same ideology a development of blood and soil ideology, diverse occult teachings, and the ideas of Friedrich Nietzsche in connection to Darwinism. Greek black metal musician Magus Wampyr Daoloth (of Necromantia and Thou Art Lord) said in an interview for Lords of Chaos: "If you consider that fascism and Satanism have a lot of similarities as they both advocate power, spiritual and physical excellence, responsibility, survival of the fittest, elitism, etc., it's logical that some bands advocate both". However, many pagan and far-right bands see Satanism as a part of Christianity or Judaism.

== Relations with the broader white nationalist movement ==
Many white nationalists have warmly received NSBM for its lyrical content and ideals. However, some have not, due to the music style as well as the genre's perceived association with the rock-and-roll lifestyle. However, Lords of Chaos notes that alcohol and illegal drugs never played a big part in the Norwegian black metal scene. Bård G. Eithun, on the other hand, stated that many in the early scene "were almost alcoholics". Some also reject black metal musicians and fans since many of them have long hair, which they associate with hippies and left-wingers. Dayal Patterson writes that "NSBM has become a movement in its own right," one which has reached Western Europe and the Americas and overlapped with fans of more traditional far-right music genres such as Oi! and Rock Against Communism.

The record label Resistance Records, a Canadian record label promoting white nationalism and white separatism, purchased Vikernes' Cymophane Records and began releasing black metal recordings, many through a sub-label, Unholy Records. William Luther Pierce, founder of the white nationalist National Alliance, sought to promote NSBM as well as other forms of white nationalist music through Resistance, believing that music would "make the National Alliance rich and spread its message most effectively". To this end, he accommodated Absurd frontman Hendrik Möbus while the latter had fled to the United States to evade German authorities. Although Pierce appreciated the ideological mindset of NSBM and Resistance Records, as well as the financial gains, the music did not personally appeal to him, and he attacked the "sex, drugs & rock'n'roll" and what he called "negroid" influences.

Asgardsrei festival, which has established itself as the major festival for NSBM, has been noted by analysts and journalists to function as a meetup point and pan-European and transnational networking hub for neo-Nazis, white supremacists, and other far-right extremists. In addition to the concert organizers' connections to the Ukrainian nationalist Azov Assault Brigade, Ukrainian far-right political party National Corps, and Russian-Ukrainian neo-Nazi movement Wotanjugend, members of the German neo-Nazi party The III. Path, the United States-based neo-Nazi terrorist organization Atomwaffen Division, the Italian neo-fascist movement and former political party CasaPound, and the Greek neo-Nazi party Golden Dawn have all participated in the festival. Members of neo-Nazi forums and chats such as Iron March, Stormfront, and neo-Nazi chat servers on Discord have attended and praised Asgardsrei, and the American white nationalist Greg Johnson posted a review of the 2019 festival on his alt-right publication Counter Currents.

Steelfest black metal festival is heavily associated with NSBM bands and the neo-Nazi Nordic Resistance Movement: Goatmoon that has played for several years organized support concerts for NRM member accused of the murder of an antifascist, another participating band Nattfog's leader was a prospective member of the NRM. Same bands that played at Asgardsrei often played at Steelfest, such as Nokturnal Mortum, Baise Ma Hache, Temnozor and Graveland. Clothing shop Horror Shop sold shirts with Totenkopfs and pictures of Adolf Hitler and Horst Wessel at the event.

== Relations with the broader black metal scene ==
NSBM artists are a small minority within black metal. They have also been rejected or strongly criticized by many prominent black metal musicians – including Jon Nödtveidt, Tormentor, King ov Hell, Infernus, Lord Ahriman, Emperor Magus Caligula, Protector, Erik Danielsson of Watain, and the members of Arkhon Infaustus. Some black-metallers liken Nazism to Christianity in that it is authoritarian, collectivist, and involves a "herd mentality". It also conflicts with the misanthropic views of many artists; Benjamin Hedge Olson writes that the shunning of Nazism within the scene "has nothing to do with notions of a 'universal humanity' or a rejection of hate", but that Nazism is shunned "because its hatred is too specific and exclusive". Joakim of Craft said, "I don't think national socialism mix[es] with the ideology of real Black Metal in a way, but that doesn't go further than labels. I only think NS Black Metal is an inappropriate label for the music". While some black-metallers boycott NSBM bands and labels, others draw a line between the music and the musicians, as they only care for the music. Some have criticized this as passive support for NSBM. The bigger print metal magazines tend to ignore records by NSBM bands. Christian Dornbusch and Hans-Peter Killguss's 2005 book Unheilige Allianzen caused a short debate, leading Legacy magazine to stop printing ads for NSBM labels. Another debate happened in the "letters" section of Rock Hard magazine following the article Der rechte Rand im Black Metal (Black Metal's Far-right Border). According to Unheilige Allianzen, völkisch pagan metal and neo-Nazism were the current trends in black metal and in turn, were affecting the broader metal scene. Stewart Voegtlin likewise wrote for Stylus in 2006 that "with a 'nationalistic' wave of violence and hatred spreading from Scandinavia and infiltrating France and Germany, the unfortunate exploits of a few will likely continue to supersede the music itself."

== Denial of identification ==
Some bands have denied being labeled NSBM, and assert that they are either pagan or instead prefer the label "nationalist black metal." Official statements against this label have been made by bands such as Graveland. Akitsa, a group sometimes rumoured to be NSBM, made strong statements against the Nazi ideology and the whole NSBM genre. Ukrainian band Nokturnal Mortum has made efforts to distance themselves from the movement, but still continue to occasionally partake in some NSBM practices such as playing at festivals held for the genre.

While some bands made statements which the scene and critics has taken as genuine statements condemning Nazism, other bands' statements has, by many critics, been viewed merely as a tactic to be able to play live gigs or not have their music banned, such is the case with Graveland, among others, who has continued to openly support white supremacist organizers after making statements about being "unpolitical".

== See also ==
- List of National Socialist black metal bands
- Nazi punk
- White power music
