= Nazi punk =

Subgenre of punk rock

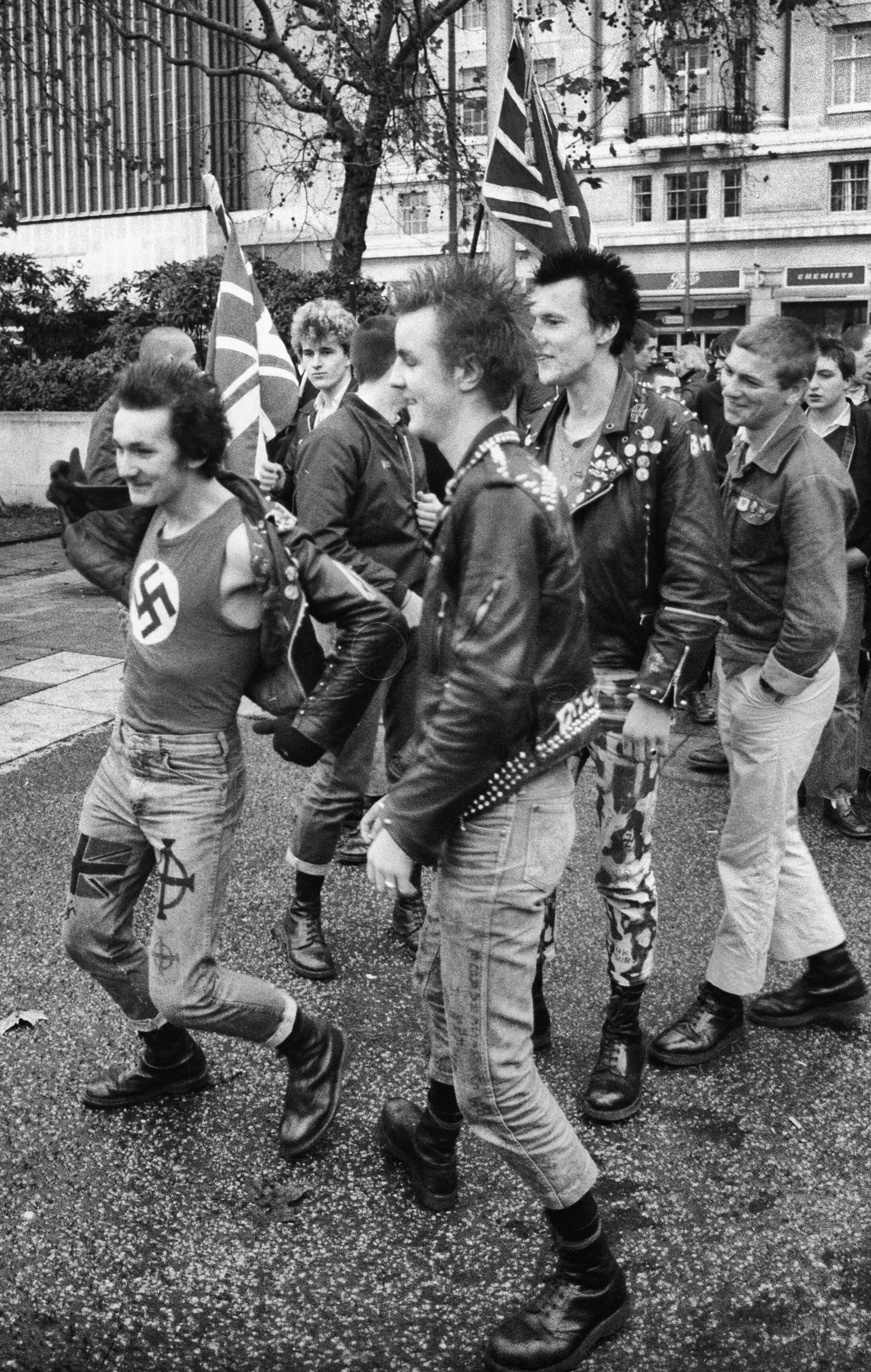
Skinhead and punk supporters of the British Movement c. 1979

A Nazi punk is a neo-Nazi who is part of the punk subculture. The term also describes the related music genre. Nazi Punk music generally sounds like other forms of punk rock, but differs by having lyrics that express hatred of some ethnic minorities, Jews, communists, homosexuals, anarchists, and other perceived enemies. It is a subgenre of punk that contrasts sharply with the anti-authoritarian and frequently leftist ideas prevalent in much of the punk subculture.

In 1978 in Britain, the white nationalist National Front had a punk-oriented youth organization called the Punk Front. Although the Punk Front only lasted one year, it recruited several English punks, as well as forming a number of white power punk bands such as Dentists, The Ventz, Tragic Minds, and White Boss. In the early 1980s, the white power skinhead band Brutal Attack temporarily transformed into a Nazi punk band.

The Nazi Punk subculture appeared in the United States by the early 1980s, around the hardcore punk scene.

== See also ==
- List of white power music acts
- Rock Against Communism
- Punk ideologies
- Hardcore skinhead
- Nazi chic
- Nazi Punks Fuck Off

== Bibliography ==
- Blush, Steven, American Hardcore: A Tribal History
- Condemned Magazine issue #2.
- Morrison, Eddy, Memoirs of a Street Soldier: A Life in White Nationalism
- National Front, The Punk Front: 1978–79
- Reynolds, Simon, Rip It Up and Start Again: Postpunk 1978–1984
- Sabin, Roger, Punk Rock: So What?
