= White power music =

Music promoting white supremacy

White power music, also called white noise music, white nationalist music, or hate music, is music that promotes overt white supremacy. It encompasses various music styles, including rock, country, and folk, and has various subgeneres, including Nazi punk, hatecore, Rock Against Communism, National Socialist black metal, and fashwave.

Early white power bands appeared in the 1960s, with segregationist music, or country acts that employed racist and pro Ku Klux Klan themes. The most popular of these was the American country musician Johnny Rebel. Influenced by the white power country acts, Ian Stuart Donaldson and his band Skrewdriver were the first major white power rock band; they allied themselves with the fascist National Front. Skrewdriver's popularity spread white power music.

White power music has been used as a recruiting and fundraising tool for white supremacist movements, and is frequently banned from streaming platforms and from distribution in some countries.

== Definition and names ==
White power music is music that promotes overt white supremacy. Scholars have used a variety of names in referring to it. It is also called white noise music, white racial extremist music, or hate music. Some of the musicians refer to it as white nationalist music; however, this is contested by some of the more blatantly neo-Nazi bands like Landser, who, adhering to original Nazi ideas of German superiority, oppose white nationalism and its idea of a single "white nation" that includes Slavs. The term Rock Against Communism (RAC) originally referred to a specific organization involved in 1980s British white power rock; this organization was very influential, and their kind of white power music came to be referred to as Rock Against Communism. The term is also frequently used to refer to white power rock generally, even outside of this era.

In her 2017 book on white power music, Reichsrock, scholar Kirsten Dyck described the terminology issues at play. She noted "white-power music" as creating a "clear distinction" between white power music in its focus on "power", which was "blatantly pro-racist", and music that happened to inadvertently promote racism, as the term "white-supremacist music" might imply. She also wrote that it was clearly inclusive of non-rock music in a way "hate rock" as a term was not.

Dyck wrote that white power music was "an umbrella category that encompasses many local music scenes and various types of pro-white racist music from around the world", many of which were quite disparate. Ethnomusicologist Benjamin R. Teitelbaum argues that white power music "can be defined by lyrics that demonize variously conceived non-whites and advocate racial pride and solidarity. Most often, however, insiders conceptualized white power music as the combination of those themes with pounding rhythms and a charging punk or metal-based accompaniment." Dyck defined it as "any music produced and distributed by individuals who are actively trying to advance what they view as a white-power or pro-white racist agenda."

== Analysis ==
Colin K. Gilmore writes that contemporary white supremacist groups include "subcultural factions that are largely organized around the promotion and distribution of racist music." Scholar Helene Lööw wrote that in 2000, the genre was "the key instruments of propaganda among the youth of the White Power world". She noted it as allowing outreach far beyond what white supremacists had previously attempted. Becker et al. says "musicians believe not only that music could be a successful vehicle for their specific ideology but that it also could advance the movement by framing it in a positive manner."

Explicitly National Socialist bands may break with "white nationalist" kinds of white power music in that they maintain hardline National Socialist beliefs and do not accept the idea of a single pan-"white nation", unlike white nationalists. In countries that were persecuted by the Third Reich, bands may criticize aspects of fringe National Socialists while adopting a somewhat modified worldview. Songs frequently focus on valorizing dead white supremacists or fascists; the death of the white supremacist leader Robert Jay Mathews was treated as a memorial day by white power music fans and musicians.

The American white power music magazine Resistance, which operated from 1994 to 2007, included a selection of reader-submitted top 10 lists of white power songs in most of the issues. In 2009, sociologist Colin K. Gilmore conducted an analysis of the most popular bands mentioned in these lists. He found the lists to include 1429 different songs from 463 distinct bands, with an "obvious popularity cluster" among a few popular bands; a third of the songs were performed by ten bands, while half of the songs listed were performed by 24 bands. He found the top white power bands in these lists to be, from most to least popular: Skrewdriver, Bound for Glory, Rahowa, No Remorse, Brutal Attack, Blue Eyed Devils, Bully Boys, Nordic Thunder, Fortress, Centurion, Berserkr, Max Resist, and Landser.

== Varieties ==
It encompasses various music styles, including rock, country, and folk. Notable genres of white power music include Nazi punk, Rock Against Communism, National Socialist black metal, and fashwave. There is also fascist experimental music, racist skinhead, and white power heavy metal music.

=== White power country music ===
Several subgenres of white power music have been created; one of the first was a kind of country music – sometimes called segregationist music – which was developed in response to the American civil rights movement. This appeared in the 1960s The songs expressed resistance to the federal government and civil rights advocates who were challenging well-established white supremacist practices which were endemic in the American South. B. C. Malone writes: "the struggles waged by black Americans to attain economic dignity and racial justice provided one of the ugliest chapters in country music history, an outpouring of racist records on small labels, mostly from Crowley, Louisiana, which lauded the Ku Klux Klan and attacked African-Americans in the most vicious of stereotypical terms."

The artists often adopted pseudonyms, and some of their music was "highly confrontational, making explicit use of racial epithets, stereotypes and threats of violence against civil rights activists". Much of the music "featured blatantly racist stereotypes that dehumanized African Americans", equating them with animals or "using cartoonish imagery associated with 'Jigaboos'". They frequently favored the Ku Klux Klan. Lyrics warned of white violence on African Americans if they insisted on being treated as equals. Other songs were more subtle, couching racist messages behind social critiques and political action calls. The lyrics, in the tradition of right-wing populism, questioned the legitimacy of the federal government and rallied whites to protect "Southern rights" and traditions.

Johnny Rebel, the pseudonym that Cajun country musician Clifford Joseph Trahane used on racist recordings issued in the 1960s, became an influence on white power music. Johnny Rebel's six singles (12 songs altogether), frequently use the racial epithet nigger, and often voiced sympathy for racial segregation and the Ku Klux Klan (KKK), such as his first B-side "Kajun Ku Klux Klan", which was a "cautionary tale centered on the story of 'Levi Coon' who dared to demand that he be served in a café". Other white power country musicians from this era included James Crow and Leroy LeBlanc. Michael Wade argues that Johnny Rebel "influenced British racist musicians, notably the band Skrewdriver, which inspired other right-wing musicians".

=== White power rock ===
The majority of white power music is produced by skinheads. Nazi punk music is stylistically similar to most forms of punk rock; however, it differs by having lyrics that express hatred of Jews, homosexuals, communists, anarchists, anti-racists and people who are not considered white, as opposed to the often left-wing lyrics of punk rock. In 1978 in Britain, the National Front (NF) had a punk-oriented youth organization called the Punk Front. Although the Punk Front only lasted one year, it included a number of white power punk bands such as The Dentists, The Ventz, Tragic Minds and White Boss. A subgenre of white power punk rock is hatecore, white supremacist hardcore music. Bands considered hatecore include Grinded Nig, Jew Slaughter, Angry Aryans, and Ethnic Cleansing.

The Rock Against Communism movement originated in the British punk scene in late 1978 with activists associated with the National Front (NF). The first major white power rock band was Skrewdriver, which started out as a punk band but evolved into a white power skinhead band after the original lineup broke up and a new lineup was formed. Skrewdriver advocated on behalf of extreme right-wing and racist politics, and its frontman Ian Stuart Donaldson identified himself as a neo-Nazi. He formed a political organization called White Noise and soon allied himself with the fascist National Front. Rock Against Communism is also sometimes generically used to refer to white power music.

Donaldson was also influenced by white power country music, having previously performed in that genre himself under the name The Klansman. The group performed mainly for other white power skinheads and "asserted the need for extremist political violence." Bands that followed their lead also "fused racist ideology, heavy metal and hard rock styles", embracing "aggressive racism and ethnic nationalism". Donaldson is frequently regarded as the father of white power rock music. After Skrewdriver became popular, this style of music spread throughout the 1980s.

National Socialist black metal (NSBM) is black metal that promotes National Socialist (Nazi) beliefs through their lyrics and imagery. These beliefs often include: white supremacy, racial separatism, antisemitism, and Nazi interpretations of paganism or Satanism (Nazi mysticism). According to Mattias Gardell, NSBM musicians see "national socialism as a logical extension of the political and spiritual dissidence inherent in black metal." Some black metal bands have made references to Nazi Germany purely for shock value, much like some punk rock and heavy metal bands. According to Christian Dornbusch and Hans-Peter Killguss, völkisch pagan metal and neo-Nazism are the current trends in the black metal scene, and are affecting the broader metal scene. Mattias Gardell, however, sees NSBM artists as a minority within black metal.

=== White power folk music ===
Folk music espousing white power themes is also common, sometimes called hate folk, neo-Nazi folk or Aryan folk. The American white power musician Eric Owens is one of the more prominent folk singers in the genre; the Swedish musician Odalmannen and the German singer Frank Rennicke were also identified as such by the scholar Helene Lööw. Satanist and neo-Nazi leader Pekka Siitoin also released a music album described as Nazi folk and punk in 1986.

== Record companies ==
=== Reb Rebel Records ===
In 1966, businessman Jay "J.D." Miller created a niche record label for his company, the defiantly segregationist Reb Rebel Records. It was arguably the most notable of the racist country music record labels. Reb Rebel released 21 singles and For Segregationists Only, an album of its ten bestselling songs, four of which were Johnny Rebel's. The label's first single, "Dear Mr. President" (referring to then-president Lyndon B. Johnson), by Happy Fats (Leroy Leblanc), sold more than 200,000 copies. The song parodied Johnson's Great Society programs, which aimed to eliminate poverty and racial injustice.

Other songs were primarily about civil rights or the Vietnam War, "but they never really attacked black people". The studio's second release, "Flight NAACP 105" by "the Son of Mississippi" (Joe Norris), was the label's bestseller; the track was a "spontaneous skit in the vein of Amos 'n' Andy". It was the first in a series of "highly racist take-offs" of Amos n' Andy.

=== Rebelles Européens ===
Rebelles Européens, a French record label, was the major white power music label in France. Until the 1990s, it, with the German label Rock-O-Rama, represented the largest white power record labels. However, in 1993 it declined and was supplanted in relevance by the American Resistance Records.

=== Resistance Records ===
It was founded in 1994 by George Burdi, himself the lead singer of the white power band RaHoWa. With it, they published Resistance magazine, a white power music magazine; according to scholar Mattias Gardell, the magazine was known for being far-higher quality than most other periodicals in the white supremacist movement. The label quickly grew over the 1990s, signing several major white power music acts like No Remorse. It and Hawthorne then experienced legal troubles, afterwards being bought by National Alliance head William Luther Pierce. They described white power music as "the soundtrack to the white revolution".

=== Tri-State Terror Records ===
American record label established in 1994; founded in response to Resistance by a former member of the white power band Nordic Thunder. It ceased in 2001. Most of the bands released on the label played heavy metal and hatecore style music

=== Rock-O-Rama Records ===
Rock-O-Rama Records was a German record label. It was one of the largest white power record labels prior to the 1990s.

=== Nordland ===
Nordland was a Swedish white power label. They were closely affiliated with the American record label Resistance Records. Based on Resistance Records's Resistance magazine, Nordland Records created a magazine, Nordland, established in January 1995. Resistance and Nordland had effectively identical layouts and organization. The writers of the two magazines regularly communicated and collaborated with each other; this enabled a transatlantic white power music axis.

=== Northern Heritage ===
Northern Heritage is a Finnish white power record label run by Mikko Aspa whose bands range from metal to rock to noise and martial industrial. Northern Heritage has many sub-labels dedicated to different genres, like Freak Animal Records for Noise music.

== Economics, availability and bannings ==
Helene Lööw estimated the total amount of white power bands in 2000 as 200-250. Nancy S. Love estimated it to be 350 in 2016. In the 1990s, white power music started being made available online, particularly by Resistance Records.

White power music has been quite profitable at times. In Sweden, a survey in the late 1990s found that white power music had managed to capture 35% of the market for youth music. The business aspects of white power music has at times resulted in conflict within the scene. In the late 1990s, the British neo-Nazi music organization Combat 18 came into conflict with Nordland/Resistance Records in Sweden, seeing them as business competition. Combat 18 attempted to force bands to leave Resistance/Nordland and sign instead with Combat 18 affiliates. Combat 18 then engaged in a "civil war" within the scene; as the result, several people died and a leading Swedish political figure was sent a bomb, among other incidents. The "civil war" ended when most of Combat 18's leadership was imprisoned.

Dominic J. Pulera writes that the music is more pervasive in some countries in Europe than it is in the United States, despite some European countries banning or curtailing its distribution. European governments regularly deport "extremist aliens", ban white power bands and raid "organizations" that produce and distribute the music. In the United States, racist music is protected freedom of speech in the United States by the First Amendment to the U.S. Constitution. Nancy S. Love noted the United States as "the only country where it is completely legal to produce and distribute white power music".

The controversial nature of white power music has led many streaming services and stores, such as iTunes, Spotify and Apple Music, to refuse listing or selling white power artists' work.

== See also ==
- List of white power music acts
- List of National Socialist black metal bands
- Coon song
- "Das Judenthum in der Musik" ("Jewishness in Music") – an essay by the German composer Richard Wagner
- Heil Hitler (song)
- Hindutva pop
