= Rock Against Communism =

Music genre associated with far-right movements

- Stylistic origins: Punk rock; Oi!; white power music
- Cultural origins: Late 1970s, United Kingdom

Other topics
- National Front (United Kingdom); Nazi punk

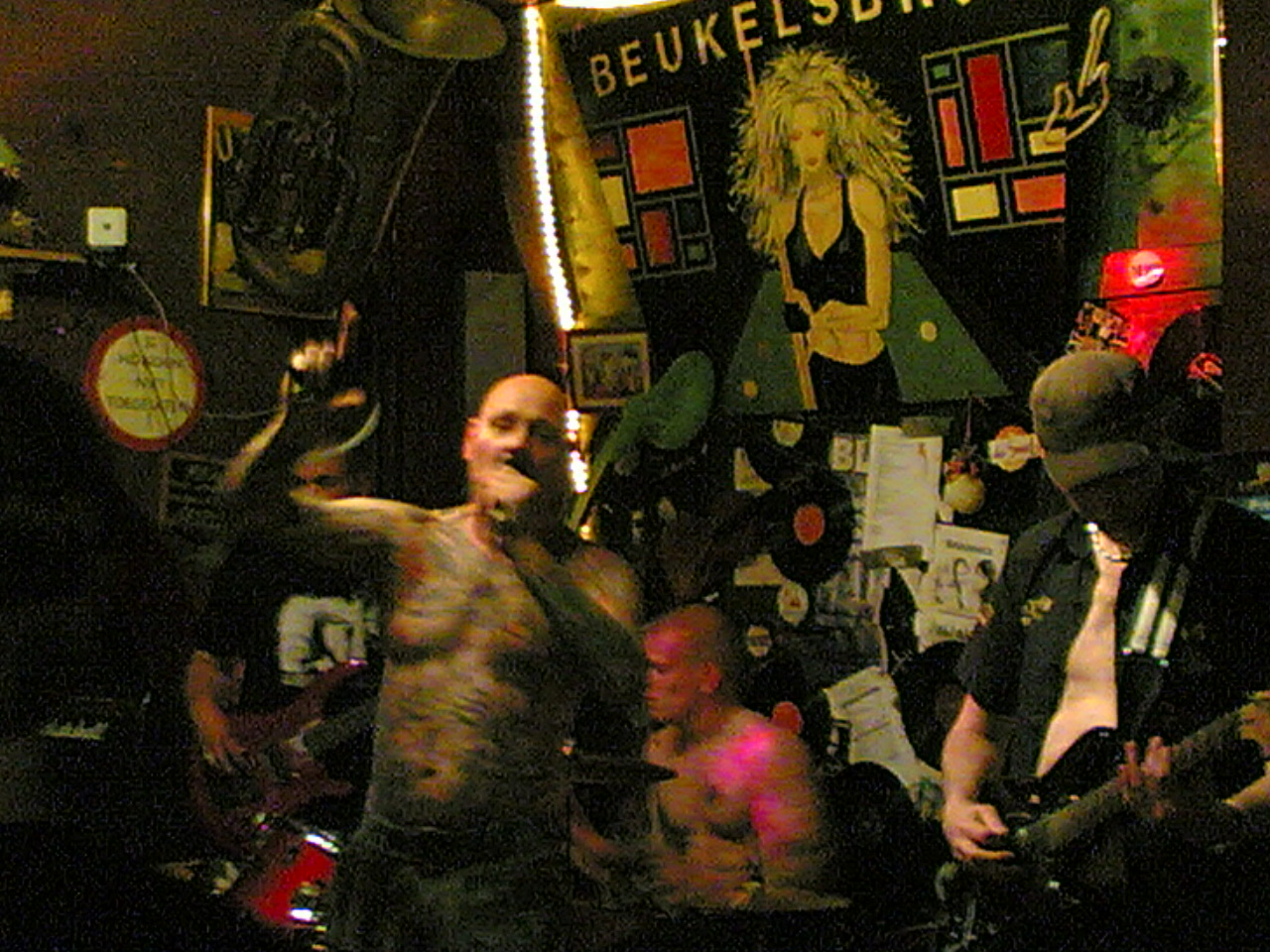
Dutch RAC band Brigade M in 2009

Rock Against Communism (RAC) was the name of white power rock concerts in the United Kingdom in the late 1970s and early 1980s; it has since become the catch-all term for music with racist lyrics as well as a specific genre of rock music derived from Oi! The lyrics can focus on racism and antisemitism; however, this depends on the band.

== History ==
The Rock Against Communism movement originated in the United Kingdom in late 1978 with far right activists associated with the National Front (NF). It was intended to counter the Rock Against Racism organisation. The first RAC concert was in Leeds, England, in 1978, featuring the Nazi punk bands the Dentists and the Ventz.

RAC held one concert in 1979 and another in spring 1983, which was headlined by Skrewdriver, a white power rock band led by Ian Stuart Donaldson. RAC concerts were subsequently held more often. They were often headlined by Skrewdriver and featured other white power bands, such as Skullhead and No Remorse. In the mid-1980s, summer concerts were often held at the Suffolk home of Edgar Griffin, a Conservative Party activist and father of Nick Griffin, an NF organiser who later became the national chair of the British National Party. By the late 1980s, the RAC name had given way to the White Noise Club (another NF-based group), and later Blood and Honour, which was set up by Donaldson when they fell out with the NF leadership. As hardcore punk music became more popular in the 1990s and 2000s, many white power bands took on a more hardcore-influenced sound and effectively spawned its own offshoot known as "skinhead hardcore". Many fans and performers of this music are known as hardcore skinheads.

The term Rock Against Communism (RAC) originally referred to the specific organization; this organization was very influential, and their kind of white power music came to be referred to as Rock Against Communism. Rock Against Communism is also used to refer to the general sound of 1980s British white power music, or more generally used as a generic term for white power music.

== See also ==
- National Socialist black metal
- Panzerfaust Records
- Resistance Records
