= Resistance (neo-Nazi magazine) =

Neo-Nazi music magazine

- Cover of no. 6, Spring 1996
- Editor: George Eric Hawthorne (1994–1997); Erich Gliebe (1999–2007)
- Categories: Music, politics
- Frequency: Quarterly
- Founder: George Eric Hawthorne
- First issue: 1994
- Final issue Number: 2007; 27
- Company: Resistance Records
- Country: United States
- Based in: Detroit (1994–1997); Hillsboro, West Virginia (1999–2007)
- Language: English
- OCLC: 31947127

Resistance was a quarterly white power music magazine published by the neo-Nazi music label Resistance Records from 1994 to 1997 and from 1999 to 2007. It featured interviews with white supremacist musicians and activists, mail order sales of items from the Resistance Records catalogue, and various essays on white supremacist topics.

It was established in 1994 by the Canadian white power musician George Eric Hawthorne, one of the founders of Resistance Records, who was also editor. In 1997, Resistance Records was raided by authorities and Hawthorne was arrested; the magazine ceased printing, and Resistance Records was bought by Willis Carto, who did not revive the magazine. Facing an unrelated lawsuit, Carto's business partner sold the company to William Luther Pierce, the leader of the neo-Nazi group the National Alliance, who revived Resistance in 1999. It continued to be printed under National Alliance ownership until ceasing under Pierce's successor, Erich Gliebe, in 2007, with issue 27.

Resistance was known for being far higher-effort than other periodicals in the white supremacist movement; Los Angeles Times writer Kim Murphy described it as "the Rolling Stone of the racist music scene". Contributing authors included Hawthorne, Pierce, Gliebe, David Duke, James Mason, and David Lane. It had a great influence on the neo-Nazi movement in America and ran advertisements and promotion for major many far-right organizations.

== History ==
=== Under George Eric Hawthorne (1994–1997) ===
Resistance was established in 1994 by the Canadian musician and white supremacist George Burdi (using the pseudonym George Eric Hawthorne) alongside his launch of the neo-Nazi record label Resistance Records, with Joseph Talic and Jason Snow, his associates. All three men were previously members of the white supremacist religious group the Church of the Creator, and Hawthorne was the lead singer in the white power band RaHoWa (Racial Holy War). The company was soon transferred to the United States, in Detroit, where the magazine was published, due to Canada's hate speech laws.

Hawthorne was editor-in-chief of the magazine. Initially, it republished articles that were already circulated in the white supremacist movement, but over time the magazine expanded in scope and influence. Scholar Helene Lööw wrote that, by 1996, Resistance and Hawthorne served as an American replacement for the network and profile of the deceased white power musician Ian Stuart Donaldson. However, Burdi's self-promotion alienated many skinheads.

==== Charles Manson endorsement controversy ====
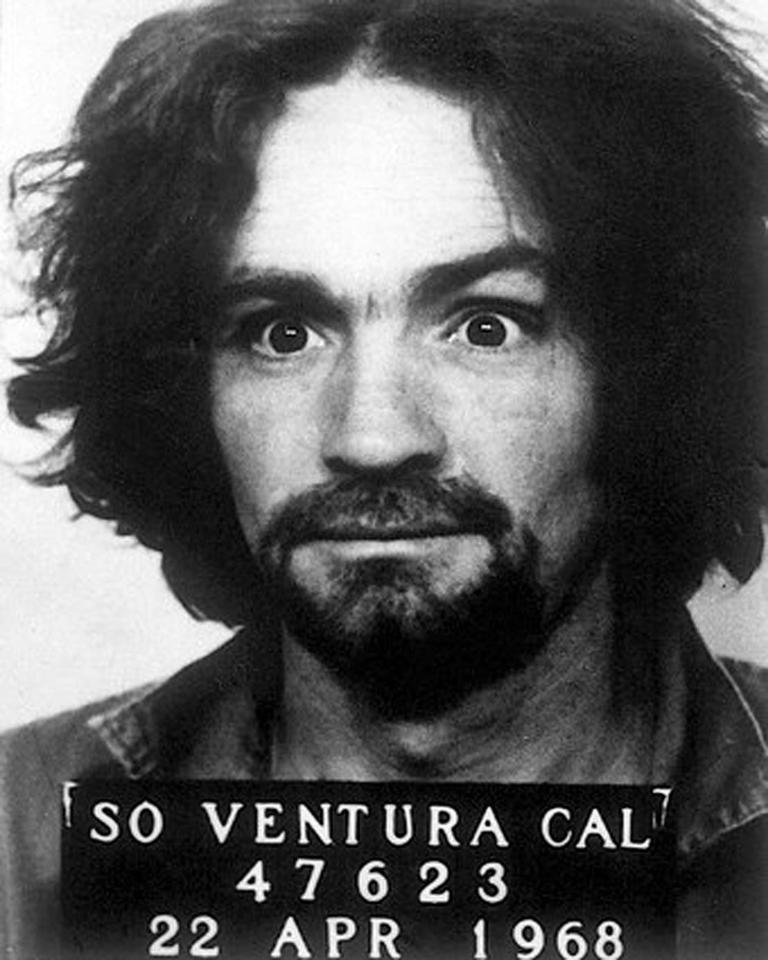
James Mason wrote a controversial article praising the cult leader Charles Manson (pictured)

Issue four of Resistance, published in 1995, included an article by the neo-Nazi essayist James Mason, the author of Siege, entitled "Charles Manson: Illusion vs. Reality"; the article spoke in favor of cult leader and mass murderer Charles Manson as a neo-Nazi icon and ideal leader for the white supremacist movement. Accompanied by a photo of Manson, Mason argued that Manson was the logical leader of the neo-Nazi movement and successor to original American neo-Nazi leader George Lincoln Rockwell, and concluded: "White man, now is the time to use your secret weapon, your brain, and see and embrace your leader. Charles Manson. Then and only then can you effectively use your renowned weapon, fury and skill in battle, without being undone by the scheming Jew and his filthy, ZOG system."

This article spawned immense controversy with readers of Resistance; the magazine received many complaints, and one distributor cut out the article before distributing the issue. As a result, in the next issue the magazine issued a debate article between two readers on either side of the issue. In an introduction, Hawthorne wrote that Mason's position was "fairly unpopular", but wrote that there was a "growing body of Manson supporters" among neo-Nazis. The anti-Manson writer in the debate was harshly critical of Mason, calling him "shameless" and writing: "is the road to Aryan victory to be found in grotesque murders of Jewish Pawns and in the lyrics of old Beatles songs? Should we all carve backward swastikas in our foreheads and do anything possible to enable ourselves to rot away uselessly in mental hospitals?"

=== Cessation and ownership change (1997–1999) ===
Resistance Records began to be investigated by both Canadian and American authorities due to potential tax evasion, and in Canada violations of their anti-hate laws; the company was raided by Michigan authorities in April 1997, and Canadian authorities raided their Canadian presence soon after. After the raid Resistance ceased. With it, Hawthorne was arrested in connection with a 1993 charge for assault and began serving his sentence. For a time, the future of the magazine and the company were uncertain, and the magazine did not publish an issue for two years. Hawthorne proceeded to leave the white supremacist movement, and gave an interview to Resistance in 2000 explaining his reasons.

In 1998, following Hawthorne's arrest and the raid, Resistance Records was bought by the far-right activist Willis Carto; Carto's involvement was kept private and it was legally owned by a shell corporation owned by right-wing activist and former Reagan administration staffer Todd Blodgett. The company was moved to San Diego County. Under Carto's ownership, Resistance magazine was not restarted and no issues were printed; as compensation, Resistance subscribers were sent six months of Carto's The Spotlight. The Spotlight was very different in tone and content; Resistance had a very young audience focused on the music scene, while The Spotlight had a far older demographic. According to Leonard Zeskind, this may have been because Carto did not want competition with his own periodical, and instead wanted Resistance Records to increase subscriptions for The Spotlight. However, less than six months later, due to a lawsuit brought by Carto's former colleagues at the Holocaust denial organization the Institute for Historical Review, Carto was forced to declare bankruptcy and could no longer support Resistance Records.

Blodgett secretly offered for William Luther Pierce (who Carto despised), the leader of the neo-Nazi group the National Alliance, to buy Resistance Records, and with it, Resistance. Pierce had supported the magazine since its inception and had written several articles for it previously. Pierce agreed to buy Carto's share of the company; he invested more money in Resistance and made Blodgett manager, tasking him to bring out the next issue. However, despite announcing a release date of June 1999, Blodgett was unable to get the issue out, angering Pierce and many skinheads. Pierce proceeded to force Blodgett out and take full control of the magazine. Blodgett's reputation among white supremacists was greatly affected by his failure to deliver the issue.

=== Under the National Alliance (1999–2007) ===
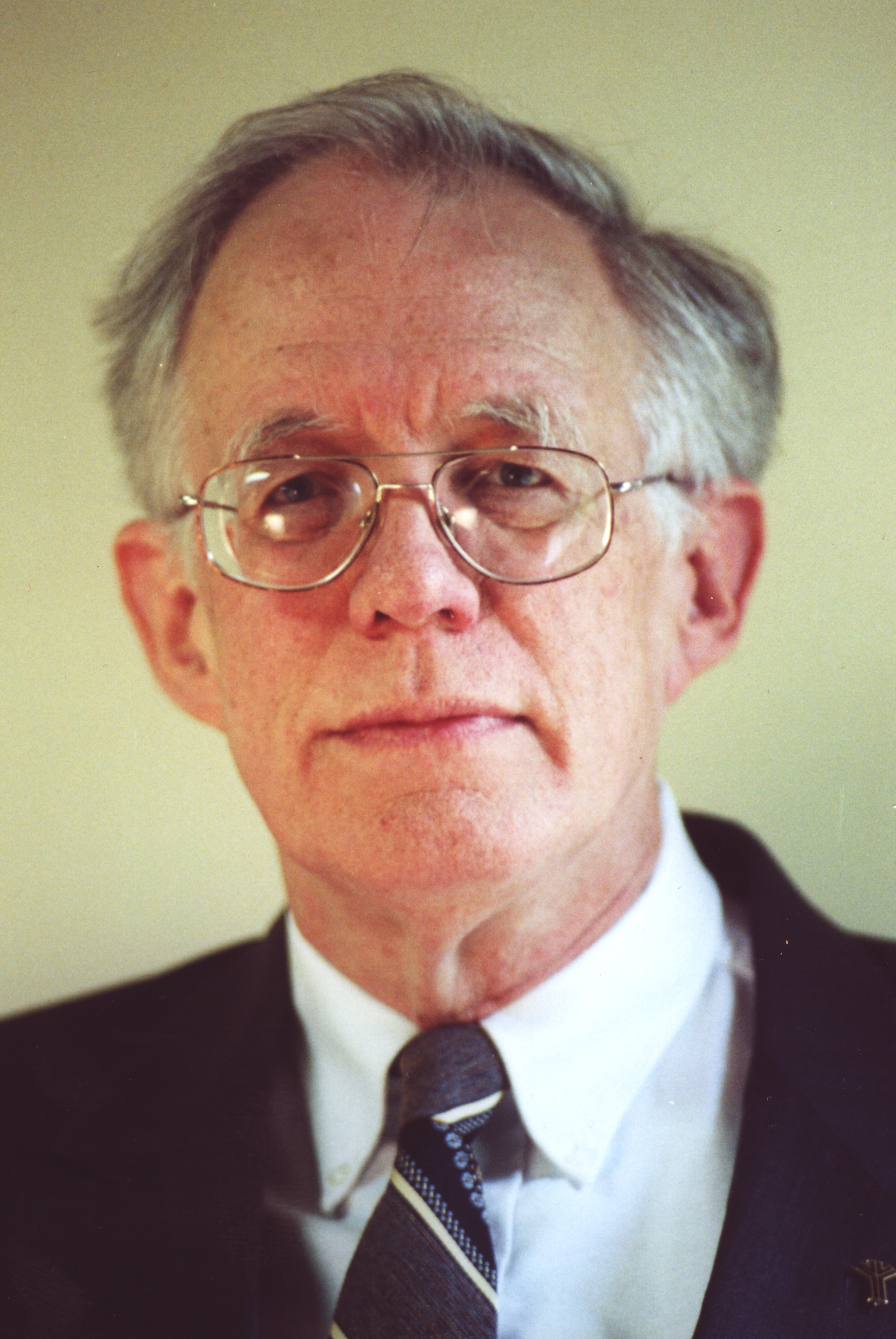
William Luther Pierce, who bought Resistance Records and the magazine, pictured in 2001

Under Pierce's ownership, he had National Alliance member Erich Gliebe head the record label and edit Resistance; a former professional boxer, Gliebe was chosen due to his connections to several white power bands. The magazine was issued again (with issue 9) by the now National Alliance controlled Resistance Records in October 1999. Gliebe, while respected for his past as a boxer, was sometimes considered out of step with the skinhead subculture. He also preferred folk music and dancing to typical skinhead music and moshing. After writing an article critical of moshing, Gliebe issued an apology for, according to Leonard Zeskind, "not understanding the nuances of the skinhead subculture".

One contributor, Steven Barry, a former Army special forces officer, wrote an article critical of the concept of leaderless resistance, or violent, decentralized resistance, writing that it only appealed to the "lowest (or most psychotic) common denominator" and only led for liability for white supremacists. He criticized the members of the neo-Nazi organization the Order (who had committed several murders and bank robberies) for this, describing them as doomed to failure. He argued for different tactics like spending years setting up a clandestine far-right insurgence. This article was controversial among white supremacists, who considered many perpetrators of violent acts in leaderless resistance, particularly the Order, to be martyrs, especially Robert Jay Mathews. Neo-Nazi figures who promoted leaderless resistance, including Tom Metzger and Alex Curtis, as well as several imprisoned members of the Order, criticized the article. In the aftermath, Gliebe was again forced to apologize. Barry did not apologize. In another article Barry advocated that skinheads join the army to learn to tactics to advance the cause.

When Pierce died in 2002, Gliebe succeeded him as leader of the National Alliance. His leadership was widely considered to be poor. The magazine ceased printing in 2007 with issue 27 when their printer, Graphic Litho Inc., refused to continue business with them for ideological reasons.

== Contents and profile ==
=== Format ===
Resistance, published quarterly, was a glossy magazine in color print. This was unusual for the topic and genres covered, where other publications on the subject were largely low quality in terms of materials. Scholar Mattias Gardell noted that it "surprised activists accustomed to the barely readable, photocopied, cut-and-paste zines usual to the scene", and described it as "one of the most professional racist papers". In 1995, the anti-hate watchdog organization the Southern Poverty Law Center (SPLC) said that out of the nearly 100 hate group publications they monitored, Resistance was "far and away the most expensively produced". In 1999, the SPLC called Resistance "the most professionally produced magazine yet seen on the white nationalist scene", while in 1996, the Anti-Defamation League noted it as "bring[ing] a professional edge to the typically crude materials printed in most skinhead publications".

Nick Lowles and Steve Silver compared it to the similar in focus white power magazine Blood & Honour, which, in comparison, they wrote was "amateurish [...] poor in comparison, with little or no colour and poor layout skills". Anti-hate activist Leonard Zeskind said that by 1997, Resistance had become "the most graphically innovative and stunning publication across the entire white nationalist movement". Its format expanded over time; by 1996, they had 48 pages an issue, 64 by 2000. In 1996, subscriptions cost $12 a year. Issues from the magazine were also published on the label's website.

=== Content ===
A white power music fanzine—the Anti-Defamation League described it as a "cross between rock-and-roll fan-zine and white supremacist propaganda"— it particularly focused on a skinhead audience. Resistance included interviews with white power musicians and other white supremacists, and music reviews. Its motto was "The Music Magazine of the True Alternative". It offered mail order sales of the items in Resistance Records' catalogue, including albums, clothing, and their catalog of CDs.

It reported on many topics and activities of related to white power musicians and skinhead culture, events relevant to the white supremacist movement, like rallies, concerts, and new record releases. It included many reviews of Odinist bands. It also featured Michael J. Moynihan and his band Blood Axis, the Swedish white nationalist musician Saga, and had a feature story on the white nationalist music duo Prussian Blue. A majority of Resistance's issues also included a selection of reader-submitted top 10 lists of songs. In 2009, sociologist Colin K. Gilmore conducted an analysis of the most popular bands mentioned in these lists. He found the lists to include 1429 different songs from 463 distinct bands, with an "obvious popularity cluster" among a few popular bands. He found the top white power bands in these lists to be, from most to least popular: Skrewdriver, Bound for Glory, Rahowa, No Remorse, Brutal Attack, Blue Eyed Devils, Bully Boys, Nordic Thunder, Fortress, Centurion, Berserkr, Max Resist, and Landser.

Resistance had special features and essays on a number of topics relevant to the white supremacist movement. Topics covered included gun control, the definition of racism, race and intelligence, and nationalism. Hawthorne said in an interview that he aimed to keep it "vibrant" and "exciting" to keep young people interested, while introducing more serious concepts. Notable contributors to the magazine included Matthew F. Hale, David Duke, David Lane, William Luther Pierce, and James Mason.

=== Ideology ===
Resistance, a white supremacist magazine, preached unity among the white supremacist movement, which was known for its frequent infighting. It described itself thus: "Resistance Magazine will always be a voice for positive, pro-White ideas and will never degenerate into a bickering ground to address personal or intra-movement politics." It endorsed David Lane's white supremacist Fourteen Words slogan, "we must secure the existence of our Race and a future for White children." Under Pierce's control, it distributed the National Alliance's antisemitic materials. It promoted a variety of different white supremacist groups.

Scholar Leonard Zeskind noted it as completely ignoring many mainstays of 1990s far-right politics like the militia movement, the Ruby Ridge standoff, the Waco siege, and Pat Buchanan's presidential candidacy, lacking American flags or other signs of American patriotism. They printed at times anti-American articles; Jim Christensen wrote in Resistance in 1995, in an article titled "Blind Nationalism: Our Greatest Foe", that the American government was destroying the white race, and claimed that "more crimes have been committed against the White Race by the United States government than any other single source". Instead, Zeskind wrote that it was bedecked in swastikas and in its aesthetics full of celebration of neopaganism, Norse gods, visuals of bodybuilders, and Vikings. Gardell noted it as introducing white supremacist Satanism to its readership, as well as the "genres of death and black metal to the Aryan revolutionary milieu", though noted that this type of content often "provoked negative reactions from segments of its readership".

In a 1995 editorial, they wrote that their goal was to "have 300,000–400,000 skinheads around the world, plus a massive support base of 30,000–40,000 non-Skinhead Racialists, coupled with the support from the general White populace" which, they said, would enable them to "seize power around the globe". Hawthorne said that it aimed to combine "the elements of entertainment with the elements of the ideological education." In a 2000 editorial, Gliebe described white power music as "awakening and mobilizing the White Youth of today into a revolutionary force to destroy the system".

== Contributors ==
- Steven Barry (pseuds. Eric Hollyoak/Joachim Peiper)
- Steven Cartwright
- Jim Christensen
- David Duke
- Erich Gliebe
- Matthew F. Hale
- George Eric Hawthorne
- Martin Kerr (pseud. David Walker)
- James Mason
- John Murdoch
- Stephen O'Malley
- William Luther Pierce
- David Lane
- Katja Lane
- Richard Scutari
- Frank Silva
- Michael Stehle

== Influence and legacy ==
Resistance was mostly read by white power skinheads; contemporary anti-hate organizations found its professionalism concerning, worrying that it could contribute to uniting the more disparate elements of the white supremacist movement. In 1999, the SPLC expressed concern that it had "writing far more elevated and innovative than most other supremacist literature of the time" and may be "a benchmark for future publishing efforts" among white supremacists. Several writers compared it to the mainstream music magazine Rolling Stone, including Los Angeles Times writer Kim Murphy, who described Resistance as "the Rolling Stone of the racist music scene". Alongside its parent label, the creation of Resistance magazine provided the American white power music scene an increase in prominence.

It launched with a circulation of 5,000. By its second issue it had 10,000, and 13,000 by issue 4. As of 1997, it had an alleged circulation of 15,000. This was disputed by a former printer for the magazine, who said the count was lower than this. Circulation numbers were difficult to verify due to Hawthorne's secrecy.

Based on Resistance, the Swedish white power music label Nordland Records created a magazine, Nordland, established in January 1995. Resistance and Nordland had effectively identical layouts and organization. The writers of the two magazines regularly communicated and collaborated with each other; this enabled a transatlantic white power music axis.

Anti-hate writers Nick Lowles and Steve Silver said that by 1997, Resistance was "so influential that it carried adverts for many of the leading right-wing organisations in America". According to Mattias Gardell, Resistance was "instrumental" in promoting the white nationalist neopagan movement Wotansvolk; it ran ads for it and featured as writers founder David Lane and his associates, including his wife Katja Lane, and imprisoned Odinist members of The Order, including Richard Scutari and Frank Silva.
