= White power skinhead =

White supremacist skinhead subculture

White power skinheads
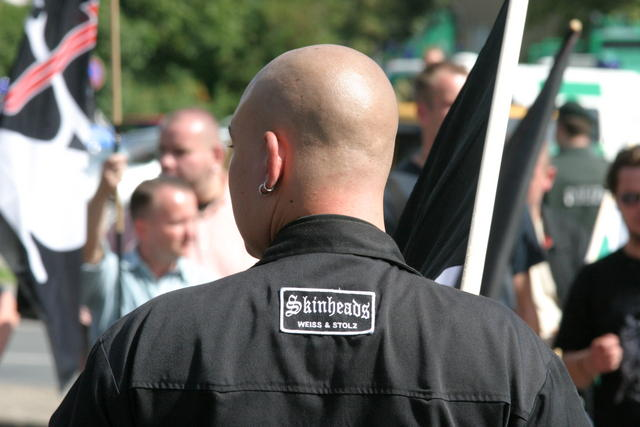
- Neo-Nazi skinhead man with a patch in German that reads "Skinheads – White and proud". Germany, 2006.
- Years active: 1970s–present
- Country: United Kingdom (origins); Global (especially countries in Europe and North America)
- Major figures: Ian Stuart; Tim Mudde
- Influences: Primarily neo-Nazism and second-wave skinhead subculture; hardcore punk, Nazi punk, Oi!, RAC, hatecore, football hooliganism.
- Influenced: National Socialist black metal, alt-right movement, Rechtsrock

White power skinheads, also known as racist skinheads, neo-Nazi skinheads, or "boneheads" (by anti-racist skinheads) are members of a neo-Nazi, white supremacist and antisemitic offshoot of the skinhead subculture. Many of them are affiliated with white nationalist organizations and some of them are members of prison gangs. The movement emerged in the United Kingdom between the late 1960s and the late 1970s, before spreading across Europe, Russia, and North America in the 1980–1990s.

== Definition ==
=== Skinheads ===
The term "skinhead" comes from the shaven heads associated with members of this subculture. Michael German has argued that skinheads shave their heads to represent their separation from society. According to scholar Timothy S. Brown, the defining skinhead short haircut mostly emerged in reaction to the perceived shift in men's styles away from traditional masculinity, which was embodied by the "middle-class, peace-loving, long-haired student" of the hippie movement.

Brown defines the skinheads as a "style community", that is to say a "community in which the primary site of identity is personal style", which allows innovative configurations to be made in new geographical and cultural contexts, or around opposing political ideologies – as in the dichotomy between racist and anti-racist skinheads. From a group perspective, John Clarke, a professor who studied skinheads in the 1970s, has noted that the "skinhead style represents an attempt to recreate the traditional working class community, as a substitution for the real decline of the latter which started in the 1960s."

=== White power skinheads ===
According to Jean-Yves Camus and Nicolas Lebourg, the white power skinhead movement, which emerged within the skinhead subculture from the late 1970s onward, can be defined by "racism; proletarian consciousness; an aversion to organization, dismissed in favor of gang behavior; and an ideological training that began with or is based on music." They have mostly emerged from working-class backgrounds, except in Russia, where they have mostly emerged from the educated, urban middle class.

=== Ghost skin ===
Short for 'ghost skinhead', white supremacists use this term to describe those who adhere to such beliefs or are members of such groups, but who also refrain from openly displaying their racist beliefs for the purpose of blending into wider society and surreptitiously furthering their agenda. The term has been used in particular to refer to covert white supremacists who seek to work in law enforcement.

==== History of the term ====
In an FBI Intelligence Assessment from 2006, the FBI Counterterrorism Division provided an overview of white supremacist infiltration of law enforcement and mentions that use of the term came to the agency's attention in late 2004. In 2001, two law enforcement officers in Williamson County, Texas, were fired after it was discovered that they were members of the Ku Klux Klan.

According to the Oregon National Socialist Movement website, explicitly cited by the 2006 FBI report, "Ghost Skins don't shave their heads, wear boots, braces or anything else that can visually identify them as Nazis. [They] strive to blend into society to be unreconizable [sic] by the jewish [sic] enemy. When it serves [their] purposes [they] gladly act politically correct. [They] are at war and [they] use the weapon of deception to deny the enemy intelligence they could use against [them]."

On September 29, 2020, Jamie Raskin, the Chairman of the Subcommittee on Civil Rights and Civil Liberties, released an unredacted version of an FBI report called White Supremacist Infiltration of Law Enforcement.

== History ==
=== Origins in England ===
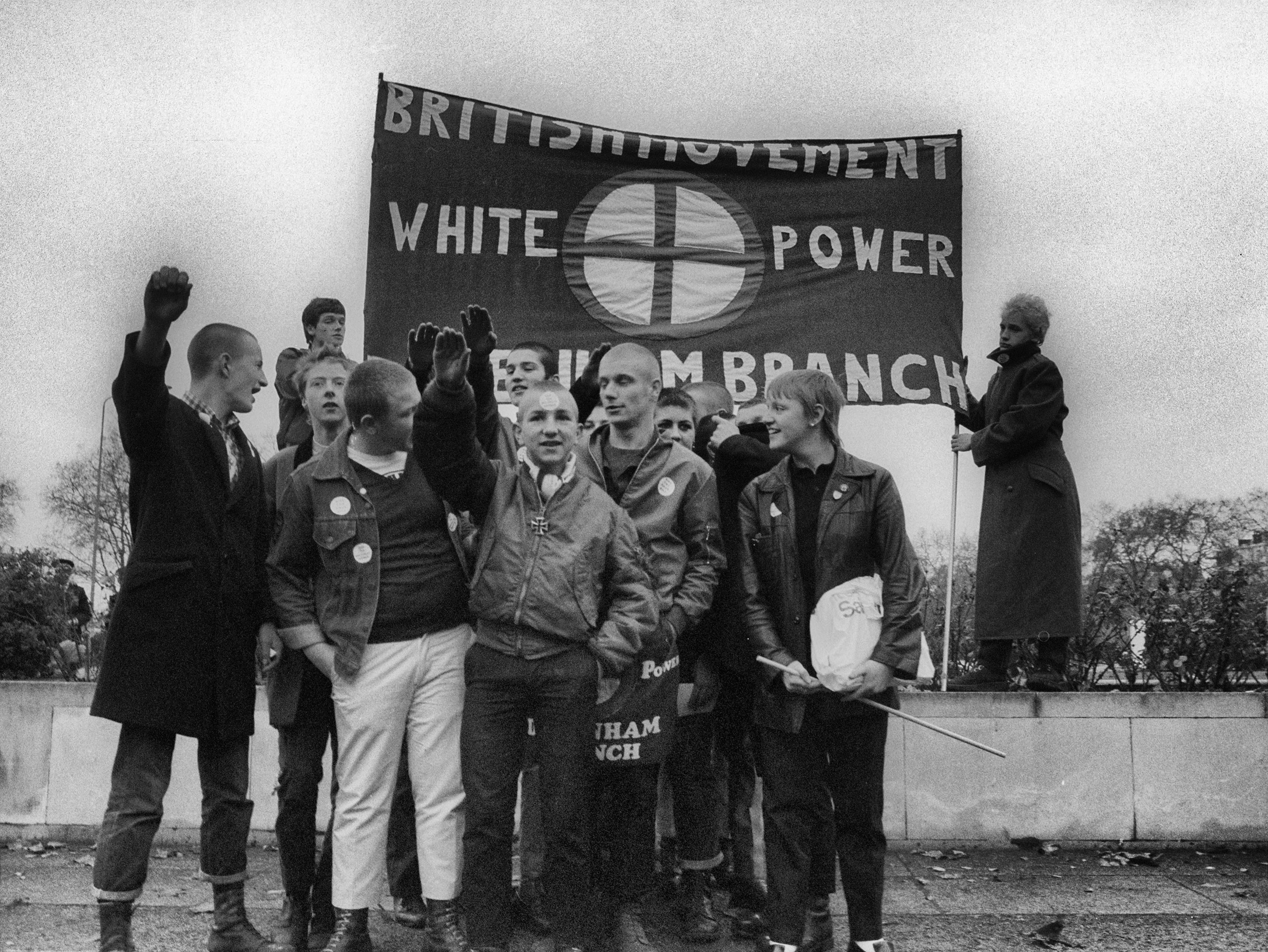
Skinhead supporters of the British Movement, c.1979

The original skinhead subculture began in the United Kingdom in 1968–1969, probably in London and Southeast England, more specifically in the East End of London according to Clarke. It had heavy British mod and Jamaican rude boy influences, including an appreciation for black music genres like rocksteady, ska, and early West Indian reggae. The particular lifestyle and aggressive look of skinheads was a self-declared reaffirmation of the traditional working class puritanism and gender roles – in fact "a stylized re-recreation of an image of the working class", which seemed threatened in their views with contamination by the permissive and hedonistic culture of the British middle-class in the 1960–1970s.

The identity of the 1960s skinheads, however, was not based on white power, neo-Nazism or neo-fascism, even though some skinheads had engaged in "Paki-bashing", i.e. violence against Pakistanis and other South Asian immigrants. Even so, black West Indians ("Caribs") were also involved in skinhead gang attacks against South Asian immigrants, and the violence has been interpreted by Alexander Tarasov as a social conflict caused by the new presence of relatively well-off South Asian traders and shopkeepers within a poor community of White British and West Indian factory workers. Clarke similarly notes that areas where skinheads became the most prominent were "typically either new council housing estates or old estates being either developed or experiencing an afflux of outsiders", either Commonwealth immigrants or middle-class whites in search of affordable housing.

The leading politician Enoch Powell and his inflammatory 1968 "Rivers of Blood" speech gave a public voice to widespread anxieties concerning non-white immigration and the "threat" which was supposedly posed by South Asian immigrants. Although there is "little agreement [among scholars] on the extent to which Powell was responsible for racial attacks", the speech may have helped unleash "Paki-bashing" violence against South Asian immigrants, which was referred to as "skinhead terror" by The Observer in April 1970, with the "Paki-bashers" simply being referred to as "skinheads" in many contemporary reports. By the early 1970s, the reggae scene had ceased to be simply a "party music" and, under the influence of Rastafarism, got closer to community-oriented themes like black liberation and African mysticism, which participated in alienating some white proletarians from the community. In 1973 white skinheads launched a violent melee in a night club, chanting "young, gifted and white" and cutting the speakers as the West Indian disc jockey was playing Young, Gifted and Black by Bob and Marcia.

=== Emergence of the white power skinheads ===
The skinhead scene had mostly died out by 1973. Around 1977, a second wave started to emerge from the disintegration of the punk subculture, which was radicalized as "street punk" when some of its members accentuated its aggressive character. Although the punk movement emphasized nihilistic and narcissistic values instead of the working class heritage, their opposition to the middle and upper class, the adoption of Nazi imagery by some punks to maximize shock value, and the development of an underground network of punk fanzines, inspired and facilitated the parallel emergence of a racist skinhead subculture. The latent right-wing and anti-immigrant leaning, present within the skinhead movement since the late 1960s, became progressively dominant in the United Kingdom, fuelled by the job crisis, the economic decline, and an increase in immigration during the late 1970s–early 1980s. By the early 1980s, the white power skinhead subculture had spread across most of Britain, largely "through face to face interaction among the fans at football matches." The cartoon character Black Rat, created in 1970 by French artist Jack Marchal, was adopted by young neo-Fascists in various European nations and became an essential marker of the fringe culture.

Music played a key symbolic role in the political polarization of the skinhead subculture. Marchal recorded a French rock album named Science & Violence in 1979, and German students of the neo-Nazi party NPD formed the first German nationalist rock group in 1977. A new music genre, Oi! – a contraction of "Hey, you!" pronounced with a Cockney accent – emerged as a skinhead version of punk rock in the late 1970s, contrasting with the sometimes multiracial bands of the left-wing and unpolitical skinhead resurgence, which rather drew influence from the original Jamaican ska roots of the late 1960s. Coined as a nickname for the new genre by British journalist Gary Bushell in 1980, "Oi!" soon became synonymous with "skinhead". Unlike many of their followers, however, early Oi! band members were generally not neo-Nazi or even affiliated with right-wing organizations, and they increasingly distanced themselves from some of their fans, who contributed to recurrent riots at concerts.

In July 1981, the "Southall Riots" were sparked when hundreds of skinheads were welcomed at an Oi! gig which was performed in a predominantly-Asian suburb of London. Some skinheads began to attack the neighboring Asian stores, and 400 Asians later responded by burning the venue with paraffin bombs while the skinheads were fleeing with help from the police. The event led to a moral panic in Britain and the skinhead subculture was firmly associated with right-wing politics and "white power music" in the public's opinion by 1982. According to Brown, some lyrical themes of Oi!, such as social frustrations, political repression and working-class pride, were common to other genres such as country music or blues, but others like violence ("Aggro", for 'aggressiveness') and football hooliganism "could be easily interpreted in extreme right-wing terms." The phrase "all cops are bastards" was popularized among some skinheads by the Oi! band The 4-Skins' 1982 song "A.C.A.B."

=== Political links and radicalization ===
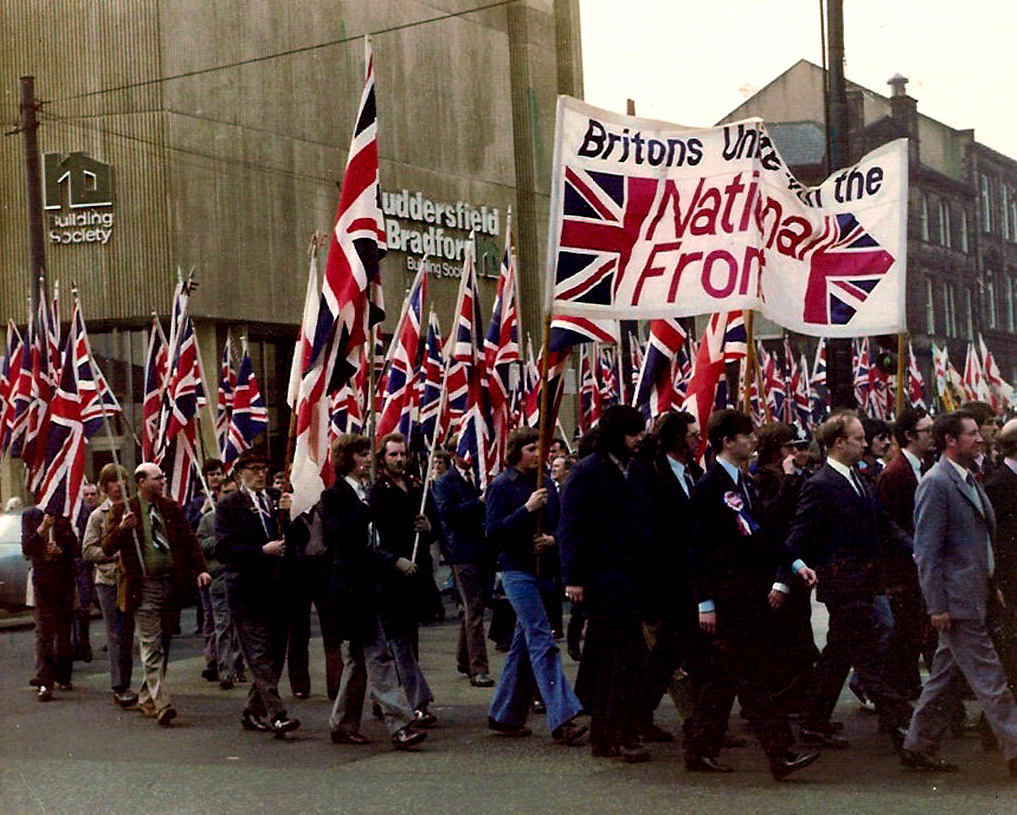
The National Front (NF) attracted many skinheads during the 1970s and 1980s.

From the late 1970s the National Front (NF), a British neo-fascist party which was losing ground in electoral politics, began to turn toward the skinhead movement to obtain grassroots supporters among the working class. The Rock against Communism (RAC) genre, relaunched in 1982 by Skrewdriver leader Ian Stuart Donaldson in association with the National Front, appeared in reaction to the Rock against Fascism movement. To draw new adherents, the National Front attempted to use the white power music scene to re-frame its message from overt hate of foreigners and minorities to self-love and collective defence of white identity. Donaldson and the National Front founded a record label named White Noise Club, which released Skrewdriver's album White Power in 1983, the eponymous song becoming "the most recognizable neo-fascist skinhead song". In 1987, a music festival was organized by National Front member Phil Andrewon on Nick Griffin's Suffolk property, and was attended by hundreds of racist skinheads from across Europe who gave the Nazi salute and sang along a chorus that demanded "white power for Britain".

A split within White Noise Club led to the establishment of Blood & Honour in 1987. Donaldson had become involved with the West German label Rock-O-Rama and felt the need to create his own global neo-fascist skinhead movement without any political party affiliation. The music promotion network quickly turned into the "major reference point for young neo-fascists and neo-Nazis throughout Europe who came to Britain to attend the gigs of Skrewdriver and other bands." Even though skinhead violence helped damage the National Front's public image, the movement draw thousands of young people to neo-fascism and provided the party with a new medium to diffuse their message. In an effort to clean up both the British National Party's discourse and public image, Griffin publicly distanced the party from the skinhead subculture after he became its chairman in 1999. The party expelled skinhead members, although it has allowed white power band members to join and has accepted donations from neo-fascist skinhead concerts in the early 2000s.

In 1990 the European Parliament's Committee of Inquiry into Racism and Xenophobia reported that the violent and racist skinhead subculture was "by far the most worrying development since the last Committee of Inquiry report [in 1985]." The death of Donaldson in a car crash in September 1993, followed by that of Nicky Crane who succumbed to AIDS in December of the same year, led to the takeover of Blood & Honour by Combat 18, "a more extreme, semi-terrorist neo-Nazi splinter group", (Note: The Combat 18 manifesto from the early 1990s called for the shipping of "all non-Whites back to Africa, Asia or Arabia alive or in body-bags, the choice is theirs", and the execution of all "queers", "White race mixers", and "all jews who have actively helped to damage the White race and to put into camps the rest until we find a final solution for the eternal jew.") and eventually to bloody internal feuds between Combat 18 supporters and Blood & Honour loyalists in the mid- and late 1990s. In 1985, a French worker at the Brest Arsenal, Gaël Bodilis, created the label Rebelles Européens, which had an allegiance to neo-Nazism. It was associated with the FNJ, the youth wing of the Front National, the neo-fascist Troisième Voie and later with the neo-Nazi organisation PNFE. The label rapidly grew as the second-largest white power music label in Europe, although the European white power rock scene only managed to enter the mainstream market in Sweden, where the band Ultima Thule reached the top of the charts in 1993.

=== Internationalization ===
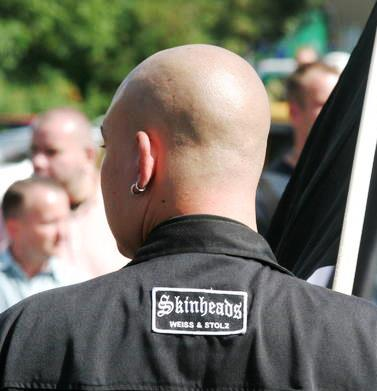
Neo-Nazi skinhead in Germany

In the first half of the 1980s, the racist faction of the skinhead subculture began to appear in Scandinavia, the Netherlands, West Germany, Austria, the United States, Canada, and Australia; and by the mid-1980s, it also began to appear in France, Belgium, Denmark, and Switzerland. During the 1990s, the movement rapidly grew in the West and simultaneously, it rapidly began to spread to Eastern Europe, in particular, it rapidly began to spread to Russia. Before the Internet came to be widely available after the mid-1990s, white power skinhead music played a key role in the international diffusion of white supremacist ideologies within a highly fragmented racist movement. In many European countries, merchandising – and sometimes illegal racist or Holocaust-denying material – was sold via mail-order or during the touring of bands.

Measuring the number of white power skinheads is made difficult by the lack of a formal and organized structure, the issue of overlapping memberships, and a tradition of silence which has been set up in an attempt to cultivate the mystique of their clandestine activities and prevent the police from estimating the size of local groups. In 1995, around 70,000 of them were estimated to be present in 33 countries (half of them were estimated to be "hard-core activists", the others were estimated to be their friends and associates), including 5,000 in Germany, 4,000 in Czechia, 4,000 in Hungary, and 3,500 in the US. By 2002, 350 white power music bands were active the US and Western Europe, and as of 2012, about 138 racist skinhead organizations were operating worldwide.

==== Europe ====
Youth skinhead gang in Joensuu, Finland, 1990s

In most European countries, the racist skinhead subculture became polarized on the far-right between 1983 and 1986, and shortly after the fall of the Berlin Wall in 1989 in Eastern Europe, where it has been particularly strong since the transition to capitalism. The white power music scene rapidly embraced the growth of the Internet, which allowed them to bypass local European hate speech laws and further develop their international networks. In 2013, Hammerskin Nation (HSN) managed to bring together over 1,000 skinheads from all over Europe at a Nazi rock gig organized in Milan.

In Germany, the hard rock band Böhse Onkelz ('Evil Uncles'), formed in 1980 in Frankfurt am Main, lay the ground for the radicalization of the skinhead movement by connecting the music scene with right-wing nationalism. Although they never openly embraced "white power" ideas, their 1981 song Türken Raus ('Turks Out') earned them a reputation as a racist band. In the 1980s, the German neo-Nazi skinheads were known for their violence, sometimes murderous. In 1985, a 76-year-old Jew who had survived the Holocaust was trampled to death during a fight between skinheads and anti-fascist demonstrators. In 1987, skinheads attacked Christians during a festival in Lindau because of the town council's refusal to allow the neo-Nazi Alliance of the German People to hold a meeting in the town hall. In August 1992, racist skinheads participated in the Rostock-Lichtenhagen riots, lynching immigrants with the help of ordinary citizens as passersby cheered. During the 1990s, the number of Neo-Nazi groups in reunified Germany skyrocket, with numerous unemployed young East Germans joining the white power skinhead movement.

In France, the white power skinhead movement was structured around Jeunesses Nationalistes-Révolutionnaires (JNR), founded in 1987 by Serge Ayoub. It was linked to the label Rebelles Européens and to the neo-fascist organization Troisième Voie, then to the French Nationalist Party. The JNR initially performed policing functions for the French Front National, but the latter eventually distanced itself from Ayoub and the JNR after mass skinhead attacks on immigrants in Rouen and Brest.

In Finland skinhead culture emerged in the 1970s, gained momentum during the late 1980s and peaked during the late 1990s. Before the 1990s, Finland was nearly completely ethnically homogeneous, so during the Cold War neo-Nazi skinheads were mainly motivated by anti-communism, and were involved in attacks on local communist events, like International Workers' Day rallies organized by the labor movement. In 1991, Finland received a number of Somali immigrants who became the main target of Finnish skinhead violence in the following years, including four attacks using explosives and a racist murder. Asylum seeker centres were attacked, in Joensuu skinheads would force their way into an asylum seeker centre and start shooting with shotguns. At worst Somalis were assaulted by 50 skinheads at the same time. Although skinheads in Finland were mostly not involved in parliamentary politics, some sought a serious political outlet and joined the youth wing of the Constitutional Right Party (POP). Some of the founders of POP included sympathetic radical nationalists (first chairman of POP Ilpo Järvinen was an SS-Company veteran), and the only competitors of the POP were Pekka Siitoin's groups that were unattractive due to their aberrant, illegal conduct. After the demise of the POP and Paris Peace Treaty forbidding fascist organizations becoming void in 1993, above-ground open neo-Nazi organizations like the National Union Council and Blood & Honour became available and attractive to skinheads. Skinhead movement was prominent in Joensuu and Naantali, where Siitoin and his parties were also based.

==== Russia ====
The Russian white power skinhead subculture takes its roots in the Glasnost during the 1980s, a period of relative liberalization led by the Soviet regime which allowed for fascist discourses to emerge among young Russian punks, primarily as a reaction against the ideology and history of the Soviet Union. Football hooliganism also played a role in the diffusion of neo-fascist rhetoric in the 1980s. The subculture, known in Russian as skinkhedy, appeared in 1992 in Moscow with a dozen of skinheads. Their size became noticeable by 1994, in the atmosphere of chaos that followed the dissolution of the Soviet Union and Mikhail Gorbachev's attempts at liberal reforms and rapid economic privatization. Their number skyrocketed throughout the 1990s, fuelled by economic disorder, the collapse of the education system, (Note: In Siberia, 7–11% of the military recruits were illiterate in 1997. According to the Department for the Prevention of Violations of the Law by Minors, a subsidiary of the Russian Ministry of Internal Affairs, 1/3 of school-age offenders did not have a primary education in the spring of 1999.) and the legitimization of violence against political opponents and minorities by the newly established liberal state, illustrated by Boris Yeltsin's attack on the Russian parliament during the 1993 Russian constitutional crisis, and the introduction of a state of emergency the same year to police and deport Caucasians in preparation for the First Chechen War. Sensationalized coverage of the skinhead movement by Russian state-owned media until the early 2000s has also participated in the large-scale diffusion of the movement. By the end of 1999 there were 3,500 to 3,800 skinheads in Moscow, up to 2,700 in St Petersburg, and at least 2,000 in Nizhnii Novgorod.

The movement remained unnoticed by the general public until the early 2000s, when acts of violence began to multiply. Skinheads attacked a Vietnamese hostel in October 2000, an Armenian school in March 2001, led a pogrom at the Yasenevo Market on Hitler's birthday in April 2001, then a second pogrom in the Moscow underground transit system in November 2001, which resulted in 4 deaths. Despite some common grounds with Vladimir Putin's nationalist agenda, skinheads remain opposed to vestiges of authority in the country. The skinhead subculture presents itself, in the words of scholar Peter Worger, as an "ultra-nationalist alternative to Putin’s state-sanctioned patriotism." The neo-Nazi Russian National Unity group, in contrast, as known to have enrolled young members from skinhead gangs. The Federal Law on Counteracting Extremist Activity, adopted in 2002 after the skinhead pogroms, was rarely enforced by the police and skinheads are rather prosecuted for murders associated with hooliganism and everyday-life conflicts than for hate speech and racist violence.

Some of the skinhead groups are autonomous, while others are linked to the US-based organizations Blood & Honour and Hammerskin Nation. Contrary to most other countries, the Russian skinhead subculture has attracted members from all income levels, and they have tended to come from the educated middle class in the urban centres. In 2004, there were about 50,000 self-identified skinheads in the country, with groups active in approximately 85 cities. Up to 2,000 rioters linked to the Russian skinhead movement participated in an anti-Chechen pogrom in 2006.

Under serious police pressure, the number of racist acts and Neo-Nazis started to significantly decline in Russia from 2009.

==== United States ====
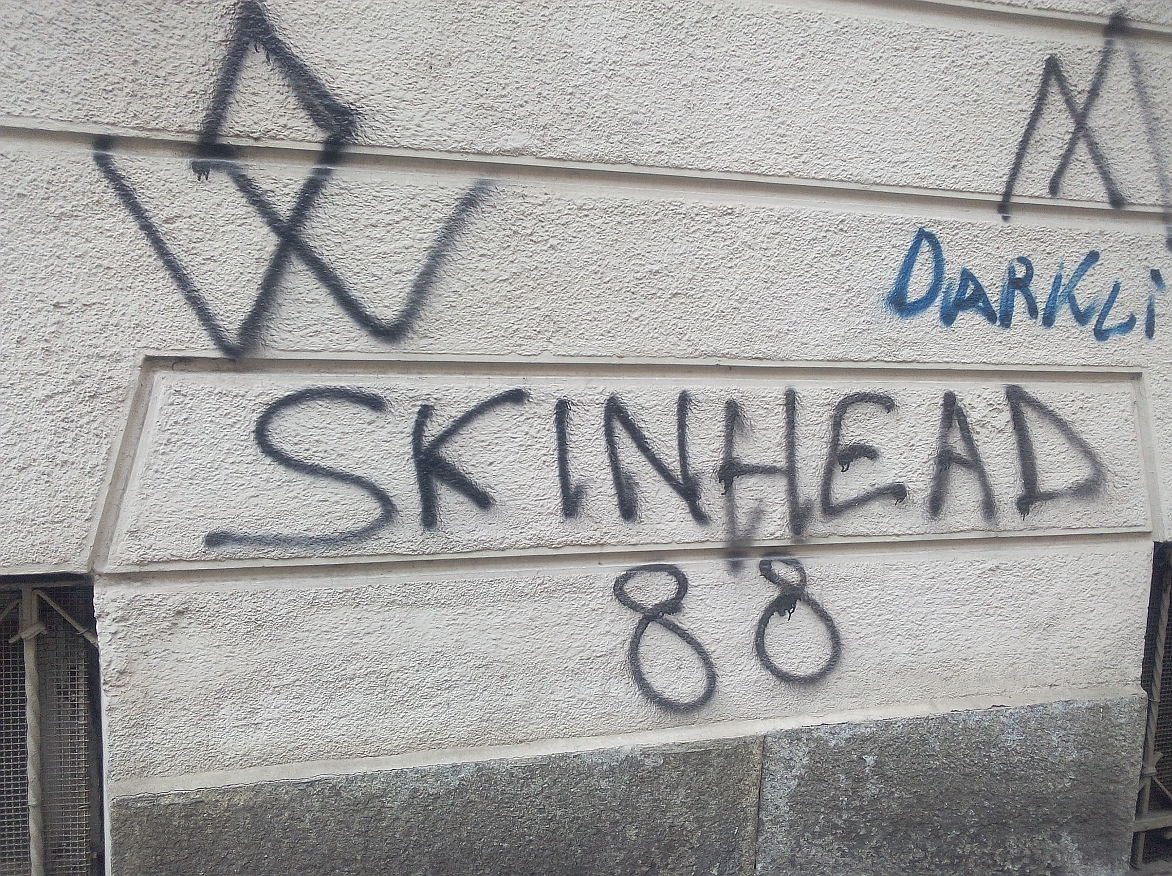
Skinhead 88 graffiti in Turin, Italy. The "88" stands for "HH" or "Heil Hitler", "H" being the 8th letter of the alphabet.

In the 1980s and 1990s, many young American neo-Nazis and white supremacists, often associated with the Ku Klux Klan, joined the growing US white power skinhead movement. By 1988, there were ~2,000 neo-Nazi skinheads in the United States.

The first identifiable neo-Nazi skinhead group was the short-lived Chicago's Romantic Violence, established in 1984 by 25-year-old Clark Martell. The group collapsed when Martell was imprisoned for assault. Shortly thereafter in 1985, the American Front emerged in San Francisco. As other groups like the Hammerskins (1987) or Volksfront (1994) were growing in the country, racist skinheads gained acceptance among existing and organized US white power organizations like the Church of the Creator, White Aryan Resistance, National Alliance or KKK, which perceived the popularity of the subculture as an opportunity to expand their audience.

At the time of his death in 2002, National Alliance leader William Luther Pierce, who regarded music as an opportunity to reach a young audience and counteract mainstream cultural productions, had become the world's largest white power music producer thanks to his label Resistance Records. In 2004, the white power label Panzerfaust Records launched a "Project Schoolyard USA" to distribute sample CDs to middle and high students across the United States.

In the United States, most white power skinhead groups are organized at either the state, county, city or neighborhood level; the Hammerskin Nation is one of the few exceptions, due to its international presence. A 2007 report by the Anti-Defamation League says groups such as white power skinheads, neo-Nazis, and the KKK have been growing more active in the United States, with a particular focus on opposition to illegal immigration. The Aryan Brotherhood has grown in some parts of the United States by swallowing whole skinhead gangs.

The Southern Poverty Law Center (SPLC) noted in 2020 that the skinhead movement had "almost no young recruits" in the United States. The SPLC writes, "Image-conscious white nationalist groups and militant neo-Nazi groups are attracting the younger generation, while new racist skinhead groups are emerging only from the fragments of existing groups. No group is recruiting in significant numbers." Sarah Lawrence College journalist Chelsea Liu identified their fashion style as one possible reason for the decline, seeing it as "increasingly obsolete" and noting the alt-right's preference for casual clothing.

== Anti-racist skinhead opposition ==
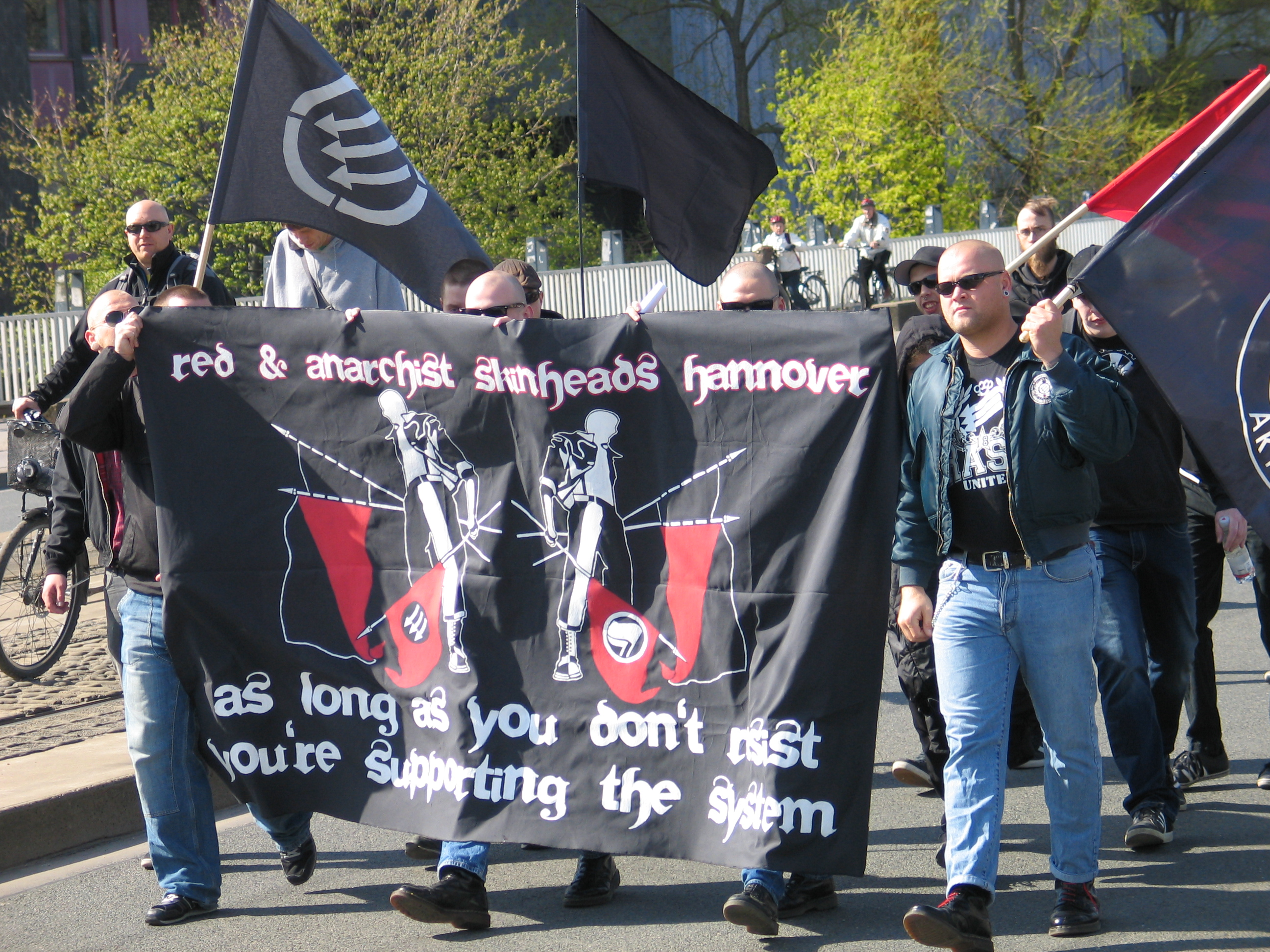
Anarchist, anti-fascist and anti-racist skinheads in Hannover, Germany

Since the emergence of white power skinheads in the late 1970s, anti-racist forces within the skinhead subculture, sometimes called "Red Skins" when associated with left-wing politics, have sought to resist the white power skinheads, who they often deride as "boneheads".

Anti-racist skinheads generally emphasize the multicultural roots of the original skinhead subculture, and the authenticity of the skinhead style, which developed outside of the political realm. They oppose the views of white power skinheads, for whom the skinhead subculture emerged from a "pure white", working-class cultural and social context, emphasizing the "Paki-bashing" of the late 1960s to allege that the original skinheads as "white separatists".

The Skinheads Against Racial Prejudice (SHARP), founded in 1986 in New York City, stress the importance of the Jamaican influence in the original British skinhead subculture. The next largest antiracist skinhead organizations are SLO (Skinheads Liberation Organization) and RASH (Red and Anarchist Skinheads).

== Style and clothing ==
Early skinheads typically wore steel-toed combat boots or Doc Martens, thin red suspenders, Crombie coats, sheepskin bomber jackets, blue jeans, mohair suits, in addition to a shaved head or very closely-cropped hair.

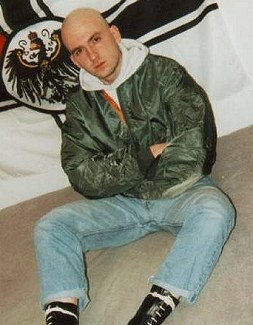
A neo-Nazi skinhead from Germany in front of an Imperial-era Reichskriegsflagge, a popular symbol for German neo-Nazis as a substitute for banned Nazi flags

The Anti-Defamation League writes that although steel-toed workboots are typical of both racist and anti-racist skinheads, white power skinheads commonly fit their boots with yellow-, white- or red-coloured laces to signify their affiliation to the subculture. Different white power organizations have ascribed different meanings to the colors. Black laces have no meaning and are simply laces. These laces are usually done in a "ladder" style: laces are done horizontally instead of crossed. In a few gangs, these laces must be "earned" through acts of racist violence against a "perceived enemy of the white race".

In the early 2000s, the Lonsdale clothing brand became popular among some neo-Nazi skinheads in Europe, partly due to the association of the four middle letters of Lonsdale – NSDA, the only visible part if worn under open jackets – with NSDAP, the acronym of Adolf Hitler's Nazi Party. However, the brand has also been popular since the 1980s among non-Nazi skinheads. Lonsdale has publicly denounced the trend and sponsored various anti-racist events and campaigns.

White power skinheads also tend to bear tattoos displaying their affiliation to the white power movement, although some leaders have encouraged members to abstain from receiving tattoos. Frequent depictions include Viking warriors or Berserkers, World War II German soldiers (especially Waffen-SS), and skinheads themselves – often all three together. Tattoos portraying a "crucified skinhead" are also extremely popular among white power skinheads, with the traditional crucifix sometimes replaced with a Tiwaz rune.

== Ideology ==
The central themes of white power skinheads revolve around "the ethnic war which will be waged in the future and the denunciation of a global Jewish conspiracy to promote miscegenation" (see White genocide conspiracy theory). The white power skinhead movement is generally associated with neo-Nazism, in part, this is due to its origins in the National Front and the British Movement, along with the presence of former Nazis (especially former members of the SS) who mentored members of nascent German racist skinhead groups in the 1980s–1990s. Historian John F. Pollard contends that "the racist skinhead ideology is fundamentally neo-Nazi in inspiration." Camus and Lebourg also argue that although not all racist skinheads can be classified as 'neo-Nazi', neo-Nazism remains hegemonic in the far-right skinhead movement. Scholars concede at the same time the difficulty of separating the public use of the provocative and subversive aesthetics surrounding Nazi symbols from actual belief in, and commitment to, Nazi ideology.

The early-20th century Judeo-Bolshevik and Judeo-Masonic conspiracy theories have since evolved into the idea of a Zionist Occupied Government (ZOG), which claims that Jews secretly control the governments of Western states. Their attitude toward the Holocaust ranges from outright denial to minimization of the death toll, and even to glorifying the event in the lyrics of white power bands such as No Remorse or Warhammer. (Note: No Remorse: "Jew-boys need cyclone [sic] B; queer-boys need cyclone B nigger-boys need cyclone B"; Warhammer: "Die Jew, Die".) Nazi theories of Slavs as Untermenschen ('sub-humans') have been largely abandoned in favor of a more "inclusive" concept of white supremacy. American neo-Nazism and white supremacism largely helped "crystallize" the Nazi imagery and have had a powerful influence on the worldwide movement, as evidenced by the popularity of David Lane's Fourteen Words and William Luther Pierce's The Turner Diaries, which some Combat 18 leaders regard as their "Bible".

According to Camus and Lebourg, the Nazifying imagery of white power skinheads was "at first largely provocative", and sometimes a way for the proletarian youth "of responding to the sacralization of the memory of World War II". Pollard also notes that "adolescent rebellion", involving a desire to be different by rejecting prevailing societal norms by using shocking imagery (like the wearing of Nazi regalia by motorcycle gangs in the 1960s and punk rockers in the 1970s), probably plays some part in the decision to wear neo-Nazi or racist symbols, or even to adopt the ideas they embody. References to Nazism have also been less significant in countries like Italy or Hungary, where fascist figures like Benito Mussolini and Ferenc Szálasi still exert a strong cultural influence on the local far-right.

== Lifestyle ==
=== Puritanism ===
White power skinheads see both the permissive society and the sexual revolution as "perversions", and they generally promote an image of "clean-living, drug-free, heterosexual, working-class males". Homophobia and rejection of any form of drug-taking (except tobacco and alcohol) are common traits found across skinhead groups. According to historian John F. Pollard, this "puritanical" stance takes its roots in the anti-permissive way of life of the original skinheads who rejected the mod and hippie subcultures.

A central element of this puritanism is the white power skinhead idea of "naturalness"; their aim is to "eliminate all abnormalities like, homosexuals, lesbians and other kinds of 'sick' and 'deviant' people". White power skinheads' opposition to abortion partly results from a backlash against feminism and the sexual revolution, and from a paranoid anxiety about the demographic decline of the white race embodied in the widespread slogan "9 per cent", meaning that only 9 per cent of the world's population is white by their own calculations.

Women are a minority among the white power skinhead movement. In Britain, France and Germany, they rarely attend events. Female presence at gigs is however more frequent in Italy, and entire families have been seen attending the Aryan and Nordic Fest in the United States. Despite a widespread misogynistic culture and a general absence of commitment to female equality, some skinhead women have rejected the traditional gender roles and can act as aggressively as their male counterparts.

=== Marginality ===
Skinheads present themselves as an excluded or martyr group repressed by the "police state" of liberal democracies. Blood & Honour and Combat18 have promoted conspiracy theories about the death of Ian Stuart Donaldson, suggesting that he was the victim of a political "assassination". The common skinhead motto "hated but proud" expresses the closed, excluded, but feared lifestyle of white power skinheads.

These young proletarians turn neither to the left, which according to them is more inclined to defend the "immigrant delinquent" than "the hard-working white guy", nor to the [mainstream] right, whose conservatism is alien to their own mind-set and mode of life. For them, "the system" has abandoned the little guy, and gangs constitute a countersociety of pleasure and solidarity. [...]. In every country, the White Power movement shows what happens when entire swathes of marginal populations are abandoned to economic violence.

— Jean-Yves Camus & Nicolas Lebourg (2017), Far-Right Politics in Europe, Oxford University Press: pp. 108–109.

=== Odinism ===
Odinism, the modern pagan religion reconstructed on the beliefs of Norse and Ancient Germans, is particularly popular among skinheads due to its warrior ethos. Blood & Honour magazine regularly points out that Odinism is a "religion of warriors", while Christianity is a "religion of slaves". In the United States, racialist pagan groups like the Odin Brotherhood or Wotansvolk have found some followers in the skinhead movement, and skinhead groups have also tended to revive Slavic paganism. Pollard says, however, "the appropriation of Odinist/pagan imagery and iconography by racist skinheads seems to be largely symbolic, rather than a serious attempt to adopt an alternative religion to Christianity." In addition, Odinism and neo-paganism have been less popular in non-Germanic countries such as Italy, Poland or Spain, where skinhead groups have maintained the traditional cultural attachment to Catholicism.

== Notable organizations ==
- Aryan Guard
- Blood & Honour
- Boot Boys
- British Movement
- Combat 18
- Format18
- Fourth Reich (New Zealand gang)
- Hammerskins
- National Front
- Public Enemy No. 1 (gang)
- Ryno-Skachevsky gang
- Volksfront
- White Aryan Resistance

== In popular culture ==
Music groups

- Kolovrat
- Landser
- No Remorse
- Skrewdriver (originally a non-racist punk rock band)
- Skullhead

Films

- Adam's Apples (2005)
- American History X (1998)
- The Believer (2001)
- Dead Bang (1989)
- Erasing Hate (2011)
- Green Room (2015)
- Higher Learning (1995)
- I – Proud to Be an Indian (2004)
- I.D. (1995)
- Ill Manors (2012)
- Imperium (2016)
- The Infiltrator (1995)
- Made in Britain (1983)
- Neo Ned (2005)
- Pariah (1998)
- Orange Is the New Black (2016)
- Romper Stomper (1992)
- Russia 88 (2009)
- Saw 3D (2010)
- Skinhead Attitude (2003)`
- Skinning (2010)
- SLC Punk! (1998)
- Sökarna (1993)
- Steel Toes (2006)
- The 51st State (2001)
- This Is England (2006)
- Tic Tac (1997)

Video games

- Ethnic Cleansing (2002)
- Manhunt (2003, known in-game as the Skinz)
- RoadKill (2003, known in-game as "Talons" and "Dreg Lords")

== See also ==
- Beefsteak Nazi
- Crypto-fascism
- Ian Stuart Donaldson
- Entryism
- Far-right politics
- Far-right subcultures
- Identitarian movement
- Identity Evropa
- National Socialist black metal
- Nazi punk
- Nipster
- Right-wing terrorism
- White power music
