= Matthew F. Hale =

American Creativity leader (born 1971)

- Born: July 27, 1971 (age 55)
- Criminal information
- Status: Incarcerated at United States Penitentiary, Marion
- Conviction: Soliciting an undercover FBI informant to kill Judge Joan Lefkow
- Penalty: 40-year prison term
- Title: Pontifex Maximus

Religious life
- Religion: Creativity

Senior posting
- Period in office: 1996–2005
- Successor: James Logsdon
- Education: Bradley University (B.A.); Southern Illinois University Carbondale (J.D.)
- Years active: 1983–2005

Matthew Frederick Hale (born July 27, 1971) is an American white supremacist leader. Hale was the founder of the East Peoria, Illinois-based white separatist group then known as the World Church of the Creator (now called The Creativity Movement), and he declared himself its Pontifex Maximus (Latin for "highest priest") in continuation of the Church of the Creator organization founded by Ben Klassen in 1973.

In 1998, Hale was barred from practicing law in Illinois by the state panel responsible for evaluating the character and fitness of prospective lawyers. The panel stated that Hale's incitement of racial hatred, for the ultimate purpose of depriving selected groups of their legal rights, was blatantly immoral and rendered him unfit to be a lawyer.

In 2005, Hale was sentenced to a 40-year federal prison term for encouraging an undercover Federal Bureau of Investigation (FBI) informant to kill federal judge Joan Lefkow.

== Early life ==
Hale was born on July 27, 1971, and raised in East Peoria, Illinois, a city on the Illinois River. After his parents divorced when he was nine years old, Hale was raised solely by his father, a police officer. By the age of 12, he was reading books about Nazism, including Adolf Hitler's Mein Kampf, and had formed a Nazi-themed group at his school. In August 1989, Hale entered Bradley University, studying political science.

== White supremacy ==
After failing to form a "White Student Union" at Bradley, Hale attempted to lead a series of political organizations in a short period: He founded the American White Supremacist Party, but it failed to attract many members; he then dissolved the AWSP in 1990 and attempted to form a chapter of the David Duke incarnation of the National Association for the Advancement of White People, but the chapter was not recognized by the national organization. In 1992 he declared himself the National Leader of the National Socialist White Americans' Party, without having any local members; he disbanded that organization in 1995.

Around 1990, Hale burned an Israeli flag at a demonstration, leading to a fine from East Peoria for open burning. The next year, he passed out racist pamphlets in the city and was fined for littering. In 1991, Hale and his brother allegedly threatened three African Americans with a gun. Hale was arrested for mob action, and because he lied to police about his brother's whereabouts, he was also charged with felony obstruction of justice. Hale was convicted of obstruction, but won a reversal on appeal. In 1992, Hale attacked a security guard at a mall and was charged with criminal trespass, resisting arrest, aggravated battery and carrying a concealed weapon. For this attack, Hale was sentenced to six months of house arrest and 30 months of probation.

Meanwhile, by 1992, Hale had become involved with an organization called the Church of the Creator. The church believed, and its successors believe, that a "racial holy war" is necessary to attain a "white world" without Jews and non-whites. To this end, it encourages its members to "populate the lands of this earth with white people exclusively." The COTC's founder, Ben Klassen, committed suicide on August 7, 1993, leaving the organization listless and owing a default judgment of $1 million to the family of a murder victim. Though this was the first such organization Hale had been involved in without appointing himself as leader, he soon achieved the same effect: switching his leadership identity from a political party to religious, Hale dissolved his NSWAP and formed a "New" Church of the Creator in 1995 and told followers of Klassen's organization that Hale was the type of leader Klassen had wished for; and in Montana on July 27, 1996, the COTC's Guardians of the Faith Committee renamed the organization to the "World Church of the Creator" and anointed Hale as "Pontifex Maximus".

== Denial of law license ==
Hale began at the Southern Illinois University School of Law in 1995, graduating in May 1998 and passing the Illinois state bar examination in July of the same year.

On December 16, 1998, the Illinois Bar Committee on Character and Fitness rejected Hale's application for a license to practice law. Hale appealed, and a hearing was held on April 10, 1999. On June 30, 1999, a Hearing Panel of the Committee refused to certify that Hale had the requisite moral character and fitness to practice law in Illinois. Attorney Glenn Greenwald represented Hale in a failed federal lawsuit to overturn the licensing decision.

Two days after Hale was denied a license to practice law, a World Church of the Creator member and college student, Benjamin Smith, went on a three-day shooting spree in which he randomly targeted members of racial and ethnic minority groups in Illinois and Indiana. Smith killed two people and wounded ten others before committing suicide on July 4. Mark Potok, director of intelligence for the Southern Poverty Law Center, believes that Smith may have acted in retaliation after Hale's application to practice law was rejected.

During a television interview in the summer of 1999, Hale stated that his "church does not condone violent or illegal activities".

== Court trials and federal convictions ==
In 2000, a religious group in Oregon called the Church of the Creator sued Hale's organization, the World Church of the Creator (WCOTC), for trademark infringement.

Hale filed a lawsuit against Judge Joan Lefkow, the United States district court judge presiding over the trademark infringement case who, after an appeal, had ruled against Hale's organization. Hale stated that the WCOTC was in a "state of war" with Lefkow, and denounced Lefkow in a news conference, claiming that she was biased against him because she was married to a Jewish man and had biracial grandchildren.

On January 8, 2003, Hale was arrested, charged with soliciting an undercover FBI informant named Tony Evola to kill Lefkow. On April 6, 2005, Hale was sentenced to a 40-year prison term exactly one year after the trial began for attempting to solicit Lefkow's murder. U.S. District Court Judge James Moody presided over the sentencing. During the trial, jurors heard more than a dozen tapes of Hale using racial slurs, including one in which he joked about Benjamin Smith's shooting spree. According to prosecutors, Hale had asked one of his followers named Anthony Evola to kill Lefkow. Hale demanded that his attorney Thomas Durkin push for non-whites to be stricken from the jury, and later pushed Durkin to argue that Hale was being persecuted because the government was retaliating against him for "proving" that the 9/11 attacks were committed by Israel; Durkin told Hale he would do neither and for Hale to fire him and find a new attorney or represent himself if he was determined to pursue those avenues. Hale and his few supporters have demanded since his conviction that the DA's office give him a lie-detector test to show his innocence and be released from prison, the office ignoring said demands.

In June 2016, Hale was transferred out of ADX Florence to medium-security federal prison FCI Terre Haute, Indiana, but by late 2017 was back at Florence.
