= George Burdi =

Canadian musician (born 1970)

- Also known as: George Eric Hawthorne, Eric Hawthorne
- Born: June 1970 (age 56); Canada
- Genres: Neofolk, White power music
- Occupation: Singer
- Years active: 1988–present
- Label: Resistance Records
- Formerly of: RaHoWa, Novacosm

George Burdi (also known by the pseudonym George Eric Hawthorne; born June 1970) is a Canadian musician, publisher, and a former white power musician who became known for his role in white nationalist organizations. He led the Canadian branch of the Church of the Creator. He was also the co-founder of the influential white power record label Resistance Records; Burdi edited their Resistance magazine.

Burdi established the white power band RaHoWa, of which he was the frontman. They released two albums, including 1995's Cult of the Holy War. Burdi was convicted of aggravated assault in 1995, and was sentenced to one year in prison. Upon his release from prison, Burdi claimed to have renounced racism, and created a non-racist band, Novacosm.

== Early life ==
Burdi was born in June 1970, and grew up in Toronto. His father was a businessman, and he has a younger brother. His family was upper-middle class; in his youth, Burdi attended private boys' schools. They were Catholic and Burdi was an altar boy. He had high grades in school and read frequently. He attended a private Catholic high school in Toronto, De La Salle College.

== White supremacy ==
Burdi said that into contact with the white nationalist movement through the father of his German then girlfriend, or his girlfriend, who introduced him to the Holocaust denier Ernst Zundel. Burdi became interested in the works of Friedrich Nietzsche as a teenager. While in high school, Burdi became increasingly fascinated by white supremacy and Holocaust denial; when his school had a Black Pride Month, he argued they should have a White Pride Month, and wrote a report on the Holocaust denial book Did Six Million Really Die? In another incident, he and another student wore Nazi uniforms to class. He became an active white nationalist at the age of 18 and began to work with Zundel.

He went on to attend the University of Guelph. When he attended Guelph, another student gave him a copy of the newspaper of the white supremacist group the Church of the Creator, Racial Loyalty. Burdi was initially disturbed by the content of the newspaper, but reconsidered. He read another COTC book, The White Man's Bible, and soon converted. He called its founder and leader, Ben Klassen, who, impressed by Burdi, paid for him to visit the COTC's commune in North Carolina. Radicalized by his experiences, he soon dropped out of college and devoted himself to white supremacy full time. By the age of 21, he was the leader of the Canadian branch of the World Church of the Creator, which at its peak had fewer than 20 members. This change worried his family; his brother told an associate that he felt that Burdi had "gone off the deep end"; he regularly fought with his parents, who did not share his beliefs.

During this period, he wrote a number of articles for the Church of the Creator newspaper, Racial Loyalty, using the name "Rev. Eric Hawthorne" (including the January 1992 cover story, "Enter the Racial Holy War"). In 1993, the COTC's founder, Ben Klassen, killed himself; his successor then left. Burdi has been credited with helping to secure the survival of Creativity afterwards. However, he soon left as well, and the COTC schismed repeatedly.

=== RaHoWa ===
Using the stage name "George Eric Hawthorne", Burdi formed the racist band RaHoWa with three other COTC members in 1990. The band's name was derived from the phrase Racial Holy War; RaHoWa was a COTC slogan, and also the name of a COTC book: RaHoWa! The Planet Is Ours! Burdi was the frontman and lead singer of the band.

RaHoWa was one of the biggest hate-rock bands throughout the 1990s; The New York Times said they were "one of the most popular white power bands". They released two albums, Declaration of War (1993) and Cult of the Holy War (1995). In 2017, scholar Kirsten Dyck noted that both albums were considered "major classics of the white-power music genre". Scholar of extremism Jeffrey Kaplan described the former as "the most important CD to emerge from the post-Skrewdriver white-power movement".

=== Resistance Records ===
In 1993, Burdi co-founded the white power music label Resistance Records, which was the distributor for RaHoWa, and other white nationalist bands. The company was based in Detroit, rather than Canada, due to the United States's lack of hate speech laws. It is unclear where the money to start the label was obtained.

Dyck described it as "white-power music’s premier record label"; in 1996, The Washington Post described them as the largest American distributor of hate music. The company also operated a web site, and published a magazine, Resistance, which covered the white nationalist music scene. Burdi published and edited the magazine.

=== Reckzin incident ===
In Ottawa, on May 29, 1993, after a RaHoWa concert which was picketed by Anti-Racist Action protesters, Burdi and the leader of the White nationalist Heritage Front, Wolfgang Droege, led their supporters on a march to Parliament Hill, chanting "sieg heil", making racist remarks, and giving the Hitler salute. Burdi then led a charge across the street to confront protesters. During the charge, Alicia Reckzin was struck on the head while running from Burdi's supporters. When she fell, Burdi kicked her in the face. In 1995, as a result of the violent confrontation, Burdi was convicted of aggravated assault, and sentenced to 12 months imprisonment.

He was released on bail pending appeal after serving several weeks. Burdi appealed both his conviction and the sentence, but in February 1997, the Court of Appeal for Ontario upheld the lower court's 1995 decision (O.J. No. 554 No. C21788/C21820), and Burdi began his sentence.

== Renunciation of racism ==
In 1997, much of Resistance Record's inventory and business paraphernalia were seized in simultaneous April raids by Michigan state authorities in the United States and Canadian authorities; officially, for tax reasons. Burdi was arrested in Windsor, Ontario, for contravening the Canadian Criminal Code provisions against promoting hatred.

Convicted in Windsor, Burdi was able to avoid a jail sentence with the condition that he not be involved with RaHoWa or Resistance Records. He sold the company to Willis Carto who soon sold it to National Alliance head William Luther Pierce. Burdi then renounced white nationalism, much to the shock of other members of the white nationalist movement.

In 1998 Burdi founded the multi-racial band Novacosm. Other former members of RaHoWa went on to play for other white power bands. Novacosm, with Burdi on vocals and guitar, B. Valentine on bass and Sy Sylver on guitar, began performing publicly in 2001, and released some recordings as mp3s. Novacosm released one compact disc, Everything Forever, in 2003. Despite his renunciation of racism, RaHoWa continued to be popular with white supremacists even decades on.

== Discography ==
=== With RaHoWa ===
- Declaration of War (1993)
- Cult of the Holy War (1995)

=== With Novacosm ===
- Everything Forever (2002)

=== With Überfolk ===
- Music For Nations (2019)
