= Resistance Records =

Canadian record label

Resistance Records is a Canadian record label owned by Resistance LLC which was closely connected to the organization National Alliance. It produced and sold music by neo-Nazi and white separatist musicians, primarily through its website. Advertising itself as "The Soundtrack for White Revolution", Resistance LLC also published a magazine called Resistance, with Erich Gliebe becoming the editor in 1999. The label is listed as a hate group by the Southern Poverty Law Center. As of 2011, the label was headquartered in Lufkin, Texas, US.

== History ==
The label was founded in Windsor, Ontario in December 1993 by white supremacist George Burdi. George Burdi went by the name "George Eric Hawthorne" at that time. In January 1994, this music label was also incorporated in Detroit, Michigan. With the launch of a new music label came the new magazine Resistance. The magazine boasted a circulation of over 13,000 in 1995. This magazine is still published and distributed by the National Alliance. Among the acts signed to Resistance was Burdi's own RAHOWA (short for "Racial Holy War"), which disbanded after Burdi renounced neo-Nazism.

Burdi was involved in a white supremacist street march in May 1993, during which he kicked a female anti-racist protester in the face. Burdi was charged for assault causing bodily harm in 1995, and given a 12-month sentence. He was arrested after losing appeals and served time for the assault in 1997. Burdi's Canadian business partners, Jason Snow and Joe Talic, had taken control and ownership of Resistance in 1996. American manager Mark Wilson was later replaced by Eric Davidson, former editor of the North American edition of the UK network Blood & Honour, who had relocated from California to Michigan in January 1997.

In April 1997, Resistance Records was temporarily put out of business by a tax dispute and a prosecution for distributing materials that promoted hatred in Canada. The inventory was in the United States at that time, at a rented house in Milford, Michigan where the operations were run. The Federal Marshals, under the direction of the Internal Revenue Service, seized the company records and the entire inventory. Eventually a small fine was paid for failure to properly pay state sales tax, and the business records and inventory was returned. The label never again operated in Canada because of violations of Canadian hate speech laws. After his 1997 sentence, George Burdi renounced racism and formed an ethnically diverse band, Novacosm.

In 1998, Resistance Records was sold by its Canadian owners to Willis Carto and was incorporated in Washington, D.C., with Carto's agent Todd Blodgett in charge of operations. Eric Davidson gave notice after the sale and would later relocate to Minnesota to help found Panzerfaust Records. For a brief time, Resistance Records operated from California. Blodgett and William Luther Pierce, head of the National Alliance had bought partial ownership. In 1999, Carto and Blodgett later sold their shares of the company to Pierce. Pierce fired Blodgett and moved the entire operation to his 400-acre (1.6 km^{2}) property in Hillsboro, West Virginia. Also in 1999, Resistance Records bought Swedish white power label Nordland Records, doubling its roster. In 2000, it was made into an LLC in West Virginia.

== Subsidiaries ==
Resistance Records owns several smaller labels, most notably black metal labels Cymophane Records (also known as Cymophane Productions) and Unholy Records. It is a front for Cymophane Records, which was purchased by the National Alliance, mainly to gain the rights to distribute Burzum albums in the United States. The label has also released albums by Nocturnal Fear and Nachtmystium, which are not National Socialist black metal (NSBM) bands. The label is managed by Ymir G. Winter, who plays guitar in Grom, a New York-based NSBM band.

At one time, Resistance Records operated a web-based radio station, Resistance Radio, which streamed white power music across the Internet 24 hours a day.

== Merchandise ==
Resistance Records maintained an online store that sold over 1,000 CDs, as well as clothes, flags and two computer games they developed, Ethnic Cleansing and White Law, which were only available for purchase from their website.

In Ethnic Cleansing, the player can choose to play as either a Nazi skinhead or a Klansman who runs through a ghetto killing Africans and mestizos, before descending into a subway system to murder Jews. Eventually the player reaches a "Jewish Control Center", where Ariel Sharon, the former prime minister of Israel, is directing plans for Jewish world domination.

In the sequel, White Law, the player is an ex-police officer, dismissed because of his political views. The player runs through several buildings, killing people such as police officers, a child pornographer and journalists. The player must kill the police chief to win the game.

== Discography ==
Albums

Year	Artist	Release
1993	RaHoWa	Declaration of War
1994	Bound for Glory	The Fight Goes On
1994	Centurion	Fourteen Words
1994	Berserkr	The Voice of Our Ancestors
1994	New Minority	White, Straight, and Proud!
1995	RaHoWa	Cult of the Holy War
1996	Berserkr	Crush the Weak
1996	Fortress	Into Legend
1999	Bound for Glory	The Fight Goes On (Re-release)
2000	Graveland/Honor	Raiders of Revenge
2001	Iron Youth	Respect/Defend/Create
2001	Valkyria	Väsens hymner - The Hymns of Spirits
2001	Honor	In Flames of the Rising Power
2001	Shutdown	Pray for War
2002	Aryan Terrorism	War
2002	Fueled by Hate	Filled with Rage
2002	Wolfheart	Return of the Past
2002	Absurd	Asgardsrei
2002	Thunderbolt	The Sons of the Darkness
2002	Bound for Glory	Requiem
2002	Pantheon	Vargrstrike
2004	Grom	By Oak, Ash and Thorns
2004	Kremator	A Replay of the Final Solution
2009	Kremator	Sacred Land
2015	Honor	In Flames of the Rising Power
2017	RaHoWa	Cult of the Holy War (Re-release)
2017	Heathen Hammer	White Spirit - Black Mask
2019	Centurion	Fourteen Words (Re-release)
2020	Berserkr	The Voice of Our Ancestors (Vinyl re-release)
2022	Centurion	Rides Again!
2024	Berserkr	Crush the Weak (Cassette re-release)
