= Ethnic Cleansing (video game) =

2002 video game

- Developer: National Alliance
- Publisher: Resistance Records
- Designer: D. Bryan Ringer
- Programmer: D. Bryan Ringer
- Engine: Genesis3D
- Platform: Windows
- Release: January 21, 2002
- Genre: First-person shooter
- Mode: Single-player

Ethnic Cleansing (also known as Ethnic Cleansing: The Game) is a 2002 first-person shooter game developed by the National Alliance, an American white supremacist and neo-Nazi organization. The player controls one of three selectable characters, including a Ku Klux Klan member and a neo-Nazi skinhead, and traverses two levels to kill stereotypically depicted African Americans, Latinos, and Jews. Designed to be politically incorrect and spread a white supremacist message, the game was released through the National Alliance's record label, Resistance Records, on Martin Luther King Jr. Day 2002. It was received negatively by anti-hate organizations like the Anti-Defamation League of B'nai B'rith and has been considered as one of the most controversial and most racist games. Resistance Records sought to release a series of games based on the novel The Turner Diaries and published White Law in 2003.

== Gameplay ==
The player's enemies are ethnic minorities depicted with racial stereotypes, including Latinos in sombreros and ponchos.

Ethnic Cleansing is a first-person shooter that depicts a race war. The player can choose to control a Ku Klux Klan member, a neo-Nazi skinhead, or the Aryan White Will (who visually resembles the domestic terrorist Timothy McVeigh). As enemies, the player faces African Americans, Latinos, and Jews, who are described as "predatory sub-humans" with "Jewish masters". They are depicted with various racial stereotypes and, when killed, black characters make monkey noises, Jews shout "oy vey", and Latinos exclaim "¡Ay, caramba!" or say they would take a siesta. Health is restored by collecting life runes and white power rock plays in the background.

The game comprises two levels. The player starts in an urban environment, where they fight Latinos and black enemies, including their leader, Big Nig. The second level is a subway station, outlined as the hideout of Jews seeking world domination. The final boss is Ariel Sharon, the prime minister of Israel, who attacks the player with a rocket launcher. A playthrough lasts for approximately 20 minutes.

== Development and release ==
Ethnic Cleansing was produced by the National Alliance, an American white supremacist organization. According to the Anti-Defamation League of B'nai B'rith (ADL), it was "the largest and most active neo-Nazi organization in the United States". Shaun Walker, the chairman of the National Alliance, said the game's sole purpose was to be "racially provocative". It was advertised as the "most politically incorrect video game ever made". Ethnic Cleansing was developed using Genesis3D, an open-source 3D game engine, and its Reality Factory set of tools. Using an existing engine allowed for the game's creation with only minor modifications to the source code. D. Bryan Ringer designed and programmed the game using the Visual Basic and C++ programming languages, while Bob Hawthorne provided additional video and sound elements, including the voices for Jews. The game was released by Resistance Records, a record label owned by the National Alliance, on January 21, 2002, coinciding with Martin Luther King Jr. Day. The label sold the game on CD-ROM via its website for US$14.88, a reference to the Fourteen Words. Several thousand copies were manufactured and shipped by Rainbo Records until the company severed its ties with Resistance Records in June 2002.

== Reception ==
Marcus Brian highlighted Ethnic Cleansing in his report on racist video games for the ADL and said it was "the most sophisticated racist game available online". The organization's national director, Abraham Foxman, regarded it as a perversion of the "very legitimate and popular" medium of video games. James Paul Gee, a professor at the University of Wisconsin–Madison, described it as a "persuasive example" of the ability of video games to convey an ideology. Similar concerns were raised by the National Association for the Advancement of Hispanic People and the National Urban League's Institute for Opportunity and Equality. Mahnoor Saeed at the Institute of Regional Studies found the game to reinforce racist stereotypes. ABC News, as well as the authors Constance Steinkuehler and Kurt Squire in the book Gaming and Extremism, attributed the rise of extremist games at the time to the availability of open-source game engines like Genesis3D. Alex St. John, the chief executive officer of WildTangent, which owned the engine, distanced himself from the game and said his company was not involved.

William Luther Pierce, the National Alliance's founder, claimed the game had a positive reception and sold 2,000 copies by March 2002, with 90% of customers being "white teenage boys". He characterized it as a "medium for the message" that teenagers could be subjected to even before being old enough to join the National Alliance. Several academic writers noted the use of video games and the associated popular culture as an effective recruitment tool for young people. Nick Robinson and Joe Whittaker believe that having the collectable life rune, which doubles as the National Alliance's logo, restore the player's health makes them associate it with positive effects. However, they believed the game's high difficulty may limit its appeal to experienced players. In a retrospective for Vice, Paweł Mączewski noted that "the game itself is so tragic in terms of execution that even neo-Nazis would not want to play it". The Record interviewed several young men who identified as white nationalists, and they found the game to be in bad taste and potentially harmful for their movement due to the violence it depicts.

Kristian A. Bjørkelo in Game Studies, as well as Galen Lamphere‑Englund and Jessica White of the Global Network on Extremism and Technology, remarked that Ethnic Cleansing was one of the first right-wing extremist video games and was key to their rise in popularity. According to Mic's Ryan Khosravi, it was the best-known neo-Nazi game and continued to be discussed on Stormfront, a neo-Nazi internet forum, until at least April 2017. Ethnic Cleansing has been ranked among the most controversial video games by PC World (2010), GameZone (2012), PCMag (2014), and The Escapist (2015). UGO and Complex considered it the most racist game in 2010 and 2012, respectively. Ethnic Cleansing is explicitly prohibited to be shown on Twitch, a video game livestreaming service.

== Sequel ==
Ethnic Cleansing was advertised as the first in a series of games. The second game was to be Turner Diaries: The Game, based on Pierce's novel The Turner Diaries, which depicts Aryans eliminating all non-white people through nuclear, chemical, and biological warfare. In 2003, Resistance Records released White Law. The game casts the player as the former SWAT member Michael Riley, who must reclaim the fictional new American capital, Kapitol City, from people of color. It expands on the gameplay of Ethnic Cleansing with more levels and weapons.
