= Church of the Creator (New Age movement) =

US-based Christian faith organization

Church of the Creator TE-TA-MA Truth Foundation-Family Of URI, Inc.
- Church of the Creator logo used since 1982
- Founded: July 14, 1969; 57 years ago
- Founder: Rev. Dr. Grace Marama URI
- Location: Ashland, Oregon, U.S.
- Key people: Rev. Dr. Angela Magdalene URI, Rev. Dr. James Germain URI
- Website: www.churchofthecreator.com

Church of the Creator is a New Age organization headquartered in Ashland, Oregon.

The church is most notable for achieving protection of its registered trademark name "Church of the Creator" through legal proceedings within US Federal Courts, "TE-TA-MA v World Church of The Creator" and the criminal indictments, trials and convictions that were precipitated during and after the litigation. After a protracted legal battle, which culminated in a denied appeal to the United States Supreme Court, the Foundation was awarded sole usage of the name "Church of the Creator"; the name had previously also been used in part by a white supremacist group known as "World Church of the Creator", later renamed to "The Creativity Movement" in 2003. The group, both before and after the trial, was not associated with the Oregon-based church.

The Church of the Creator is associated with ministries located in the United States in Arizona, California, Colorado, Florida, Georgia, Idaho, Maryland, Massachusetts, Missouri, Nevada, New Mexico, New York, North Carolina, Ohio, Oregon, Puerto Rico, Tennessee, Texas, Virginia, Washington and Wisconsin, as well as in Canada, South America and Europe."

== History ==
The organization was founded as a church association in 1969 by Grace Marama Uri (1932-2006) and her husband James Germain Uri. It was chartered as Grace House Prayer Ministry, Inc. on July 14, 1975. The name of the corporation was changed in 1976, restructured in 1977, and now operates as the TE-TA-MA Truth Foundation-Family Of URI, Inc., a California nonprofit public-benefit corporation. The Foundation, within public ministries, anchored through use, the name "Church of the Creator" first conceived in 1974. The Foundation registered the name Church of the Creator in Oregon in 1982.

== Tenets, principles and practices ==
The church is described in a dictionary of new religious movements as having a "synthesis of New Age thought, Christianity, and Jewish mystical ideas, such as kabbalah and gematria. Particular emphasis is given to the archangel Michael and high priest Melchizedek" and the goal of the church is unification of mankind "with the highest truth and justice for all".
