= Cult of the Holy War =

Studio album by RaHoWa
- Released: 1995
- Genres: Gothic metal, National Socialist black metal
- Length: 64:39
- Label: Resistance Records
- Producer: George Eric Hawthorne

RaHoWa chronology
Declaration of War (1993)	Cult of the Holy War (1995)

Cult of the Holy War is the second and final album by Canadian white power band RaHoWa. The album was released in 1995 on lead singer George Eric Hawthorne's neo-Nazi Resistance Records label. In 2017, scholar Kirsten Dyck noted that both it and RaHoWa's previous album, Declaration of War, were considered "major classics of the white-power music genre". It was Resistance Records' best selling album.

== Background and release ==
RaHoWa (named for Racial Holy War) was a Canadian white power band, founded by lead singer George Eric Hawthorne. It was RaHoWa's second album, after 1993's Declaration of War. The album was released in 1995 on Hawthorne's neo-Nazi Resistance Records label. The album continued to be distributed by the Swedish neo-Nazi label Midgard into the 2020s; it was their second best selling item.

Hawthorne later renounced white nationalism and created Novocosm, a band with members of multiple races. Novocosm covered a song from Cult of the Holy War, "Ode to a Dying People", in a different version that Hawthorne said was no longer racist. He stated that: "this version is meant to be enjoyed by everyone, just think about how the collective modern rush off the cliff makes this song as relevant and universally applicable as ever".

== Track list ==
No.	Title	Length
1.	"Preludium in G"	0:40
2.	"Man Against Time"	5:38
3.	"When America Goes Down"	5:03
4.	"March of the Dead"	1:11
5.	"Hall of the Heroes"	6:48
6.	"In the Fires of 1945"	7:02
7.	"The Last Battalion"	4:06
8.	"Anvil of Crom"	1:09
9.	"Might is Right"	8:12
10.	"RAHOWA"	5:46
11.	"God is Dead"	5:13
12.	"The Snow Fell" (Skrewdriver cover)	5:49
13.	"Ode to a Dying People"	5:58
88.	Untitled	0:50

Track 88 is a recording of George Eric Hawthorne giving a speech printed in the liner notes, following 74 tracks of silence, all 0:01 in length.

== Personnel ==
- George Eric Hawthorne – lead vocals, backing vocals, guitar, producer
- Jon Latvis – lead guitar, keyboards, piano, backing vocals, bass, cello, producer
- Graham Stolz – rhythm guitar
- Carl Alexander – keyboards
- Wolfgang Mortuus – drums
- Corrado – engineer, producer

== Style ==
The album marked the shift from the predecessor's Oi! and hard rock roots towards gothic metal with elements of neoclassical and neofolk music. It also experimented with a National Socialist black metal sound. In an interview with dis-Emi-A, Hawthorne cites Danzig, Morbid Angel, Moonspell, Type O Negative, Laibach, Death in June, Blood Axis, Sol Invictus, Bach, Beethoven, Mozart, Poledouris, Wagner, and Nietzsche as influences for the album. Scholar Nancy S. Love said that "unlike the band's first CD [...] which has a more typical hard rock sound, Cult of the Holy War is best characterized as heavy metal mixed with electronica and goth".

== Reception and influence ==
The album sold about 40,000 copies upon its initial release, a major hit in the white power music world, and was the band's most famous release. It was Resistance Records' best selling album. After the release, Hawthorne received substantial media attention for the first time. Michael J. Moynihan, reviewing it for the Church of Satan's magazine The Black Flame, said that it was an album that "could well climb right up the indie charts" if not for the racial content of the lyrics. Time magazine's Adam Cohen described its lyrics as "urging whites to kill 'vile, alien hordes'", describing it as "typical fare from Resistance Records". He described the lyrics of one song as "often mumbled and atonal" and the lyrics as simultaneously a cheesy love ballad and virulently racist. Stephan Talty, writing for The New York Times, described the music of track ten, "RAHOWA", as "actually quite lovely", "a moody ballad with an almost formal, Elizabethan air".

In 2017, scholar Kirsten Dyck noted that both it and RaHoWa's previous album, Declaration of War, were considered "major classics of the white-power music genre"; she said Cult of the Holy War remained a "much-celebrated" album, despite Hawthorne's later renunciation of white nationalism. She quoted one user of the white supremacist website Stormfront, who said the "lyrics are the best ever written in the WN movement". Scholar of extremism Jeffrey Kaplan described it as "the most important CD to emerge from the post-Skrewdriver white-power movement", and said the album had "beautifully crafted songs, flawless instrumental passages, and an innovative approach that saw a mixture of such genres as white noise and black metal to create a work that easily transcended the world of White Power music."
