= Kim Murphy =

American journalist (born 1955)

Kim Murphy (born, August 26, 1955) is an American journalist who works for the New York Times. She won the Pulitzer Prize in 2005 for International Reporting.

== Early years and education ==
Murphy was born in 1955 in Indianapolis, Indiana. She received her Bachelor of Arts degree in 1977 from Minot State University.

== Career ==
Murphy worked as an assistant editor for The North Biloxian in 1973, as a reporter for the Minot Daily News in 1978, and then as a reporter and later the assistant metro editor of the Orange County Register starting in 1982. Murphy began at the Los Angeles Times as a general assignment staff writer, and later became the Times' national and foreign correspondent covering Russia, the Middle East, the Balkans, Afghanistan and the Pacific Northwest. She became the Moscow Bureau Chief in 1983 and national editor in 2013.

== Los Angeles Times memo ==
In November 2015, Murphy sent an email to her Los Angeles Times staff, with the subject "today is buyout day". The first two paragraphs were:

Hello all,

This is the day when a number of our colleagues will be leaving us, and in the weeks ahead, more will join them out the door.

Let's not pretend that this is anything but sad. We have all shared way too many intense, insane, crazy hard times together (many of which ended up as astonishingly good journalism) to think that these departures won't make us cry. I'm tearing up already.

Murphy mentioned numerous names of many longtime veterans who would be leaving, such as, "David Zucchino, one of the best war correspondents of our generation. No need to say more--everybody knows David Zucchino. I'm not even going to talk about how sick I am he's leaving".

Murphy ended her memo that "We are not dead yet. We'll move on--after taking this day to wish all the very best to our departing colleagues as they with trepidation prepare for their exciting "next chapters." A huge virtual hug to all".

== Awards ==
Murphy won the Pulitzer Prize in 2005 for International Reporting for "her eloquent, wide ranging coverage of Russia's struggle to cope with terrorism, improve the economy and make democracy work". She won numerous awards, including the Los Angeles Times Publisher's Prize for Persian Gulf War correspondence, the Orange County Press Club Award, four times, and the Society of Professional Journalists, Delta Chi, foreign correspondence.
