= White Supremacist Infiltration of Law Enforcement =

2006 FBI Intelligence Assessment

White Supremacist Infiltration of Law Enforcement is a 2006 FBI Intelligence Assessment from the FBI Counterterrorism Division. It provides an overview of white supremacist infiltration of law enforcement in the United States. On September 29, 2020, Jamie Raskin, the Chairman of the Subcommittee on Civil Rights and Civil Liberties, released an unredacted version of the report.
