= RaHoWa =

White supremacist slogan and concept

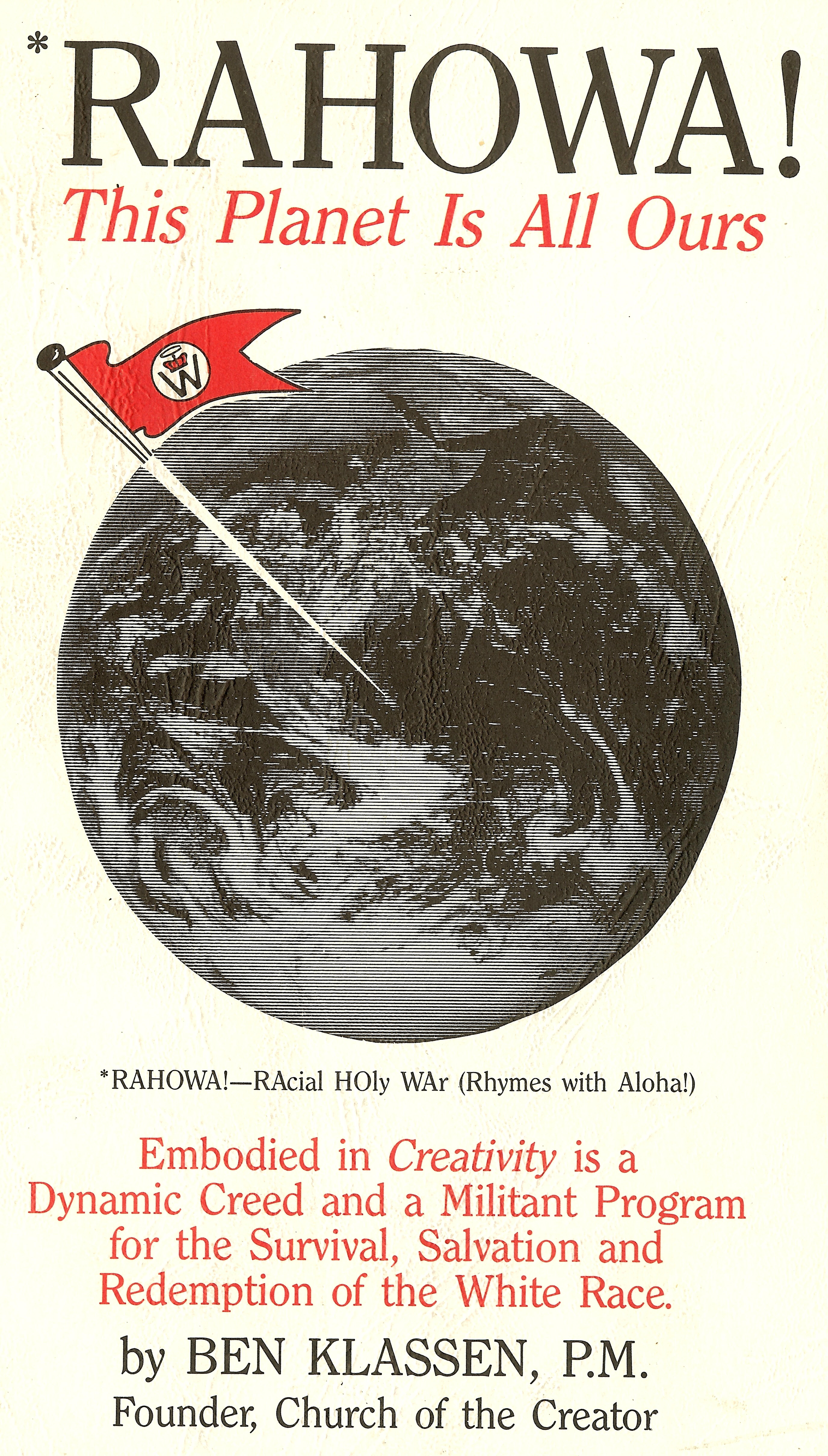
Cover of Klassen's 1987 book, RAHOWA!

RaHoWa (also Rahowa or RAHOWA), short for Racial Holy War, is a white supremacist slogan and concept, coined by the American politician and writer Ben Klassen, the founder of the white supremacist religion Creativity and the associated Church of the Creator (COTC). In Klassen's ideology, the Racial Holy War is where whites fight and eliminate all non-white peoples, leading to total white domination of the globe. While similar ideas had been expressed by Klassen for years, the term RaHoWa first appeared in an article in the COTC's newspaper, Racial Loyalty, entitled: "Recognize Your Enemies! RAHOWA", in 1986. It was also the title of Klassen's 1987 book, RAHOWA! This Planet is All Ours.

While initially only used by Creativity adherents, the slogan soon spread to others in the white supremacist and neo-Nazi movements, particularly with skinheads. Following Klassen's death and the resulting schisms, several successor movements to the COTC used RaHoWa as part of their names. The Anti-Defamation League lists the term in its hate symbol database as a hate acronym. The white power band RaHoWa, which was founded by COTC members and became one of the most popular white power bands, took their name from the slogan. Scholar Damon T. Berry argued that RaHoWa "has become ubiquitous in white-power circles in America and elsewhere", and that it is "one of the most significant white nationalist slogans shared across religious and organizational affiliations".

== Background and coining ==
Ben Klassen, who coined the term RaHoWa, was the founder of the white supremacist religion, Creativity, and the associated Church of the Creator (COTC). He was also briefly a Republican politician in Florida; he was elected a state representative in 1966 and held a seat in the Florida House of Representatives for a year.

The COTC was an explicitly white supremacist and nontheistic religion. Klassen was avowedly anti-Christian, but was also against other types of white supremacist religiosity, including Odinism, Cosmotheism, and Christian Identity. Creativity became somewhat notorious for its members' perpetration of several violent crimes; even among other white nationalists, Creativity was seen as unusually violent, and they were especially targeted by various anti-hate watchdog organizations and law enforcement.

Klassen authored several books on Creativity's ideology; similar ideas to the concept of the Racial Holy War appeared in all of his writings, including his first book, Nature's Eternal Religion. However, the term RaHoWa first appeared in a 1986 article authored by Klassen in the COTC's newspaper, Racial Loyalty, entitled: "Recognize Your Enemies! RAHOWA". In this essay, Klassen concludes that "a planned and deliberate program of blueprinted warfare" is necessary for the survival of the white race. RaHoWa was the title of Klassen's 1987 book, RAHOWA! This Planet is All Ours, one of several collections of Klassen's essays.

== Meaning ==
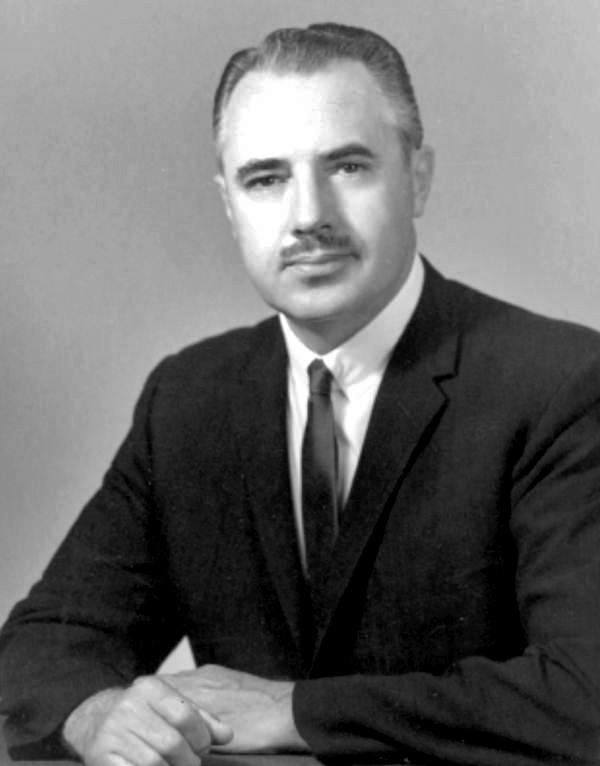
Ben Klassen in 1966

RaHoWa as a slogan is an acronym for Racial Holy War (taking its name from the first two letters of each word). In Klassen's ideology, the concept of the Racial Holy War is "racial self defense", where whites fight and eliminate Jews, Christians, and non-white peoples, leading to total white domination of the globe. In RAHOWA!, Klassen writes:

Rahowa! In this one word we sum up the total goal and program of not only the Church of the Creator, but of the total White Race, and it is this: We take up the challenge. We gird for total war against the Jews and the rest of the godamned mud races of the world—politically, militantly, financially, morally and religiously.... We regard it as a holy war to the finish—a holy racial war. Rahowa! is inevitable. It is the Ultimate and Only solution. [...] No longer can the mud races and the White Race live on the same planet and survive. It is now either them or us. We want to make damn sure it is we who survive. This planet is from now on all ours, and will be the one and only habitat for our future progeny for all time to come.

In his book, RAHOWA!, Klassen argued that whites merely establishing control of "the West" was not enough, but that the "winning of the west" by whites would be a "prototype for the winning of the world". The COTC's doctrine, as later written by Klassen, was to "expand the White Race, shrink the colored races, until the White Race is the supreme inhabitant of the earth". Klassen was therefore against white separatism, viewing such a strategy as "treason".

The slogan was coined as a white supremacist and white nationalist rallying cry (or "battle cry"); academic George Michael described it as meant to be "a call to arms not unlike the Arabic word jihad used by Islamic militants". In his writings, Klassen explicitly compared the concept of RaHoWa to jihad, praising elements of Islam for its militancy. Damon T. Berry wrote that "Klassen demonstrates admiration for Jews and Arabs alike in that he wants whites to adopt what he regards as the Jews' and Arabs' fierce racial defensive posture."

== Analysis ==
Damon T. Berry said the slogan was a succinct description of Klassen's overall ideology; he argued that it had "proved to be deeply inspirational" for white supremacists, and said the slogan evidenced Creativity's "[colonization of] every aspect of the Creator's everyday life [...] The church demands nothing less from its followers than a total commitment of mind, body, and soul to total holy war to defend the white race." He also argued that "RaHoWa is [..] best understood as the CoTC’s final response to Christianity", as a "rejection of Christianity as a debilitating and suicidal ideology invented by Jews"; he called this interpretation of world events "paranoid and conspiratorial". British historian Nicholas Goodrick-Clarke said Klassen's calls for Racial Holy War "uncannily recalls Lanz von Liebenfels's call in his pre-1914 völkisch Ariosophy for Aryans to wage a global race war against the "apish" lower races".

Using the term synonymously with the concept of "race war", Sara Kamali argued that RaHoWa was "a dominant theme across White nationalism"; she wrote that "within the logic of RAHOWA, violence is the necessary response to perceived cultural and racial dislocation and the primary method to combat White genocide, or the usurpation of the White race by people of color, and the subsequent moral degradation of the United States." Michael Waltman and John Haas argued that the concept "imbues the ideology of hate with apocalypticism and millennialism".

== Usage ==
It became a motto of the Church of the Creator. The term has also become very popular in the white supremacist movement broadly. Initially only used by Creativity adherents, it soon spread to others in the white supremacist and neo-Nazi movement, particularly skinheads. Skinhead ideology began to utilize the RaHoWa concept by the early 1990s. Despite Klassen's immense dislike of Christianity and other racialist religions, the term has also been utilized by Christian Identity activists, and Odinists. George Michael said that "much of Creativity’s rhetoric, such as RAHOWA, gained currency in the vernacular of the extreme right all over the world", while Damon T. Berry argued that it "has become ubiquitous in white-power circles in America and elsewhere", and was "one of the most significant white nationalist slogans shared across religious and organizational affiliations".

The Anti-Defamation League lists it in its hate symbol database as a hate acronym. White supremacists regularly include the slogan on numerous kinds of merchandise, and tattoos. Berry said that it had become used as a logo among white supremacists, as a sign "for those who want to show themselves as the most committed to white survival".

Klassen killed himself in 1993, resulting in schisms and the destruction of the original COTC. There emerged various successor organizations. After his death, one branch of the COTC, the Worldwide Church of the Creator, issued a newsletter called RaHoWa News. A later schism from the successors to the COTC called itself the Church of the RaHoWa; yet another was called The White Crusaders of RaHoWa! The Milwaukee section of the COTC designated March 10 "RAHOWA Day", after the day considered the church's starting day on, March 10, 1982, when ground was first broken on the COTC headquarters in North Carolina.

George Burdi (also known as George Eric Hawthorne), a Canadian COTC member, took the RaHoWa name for his skinhead white power band, RaHoWa. They were one of the most famous white power bands in the 1990s and influenced on the development of white power music as a genre. They released two albums, including Declaration of War (1993) and Cult of the Holy War (1995), the latter which includes a song of the same name.

== See also ==
- Fourteen Words
- White jihad
- White power
- White pride
- The Turner Diaries, a 1978 novel by National Alliance leader William Luther Pierce that promotes a similar concept of a race war against non-white peoples
