= Panzerfaust Records =

American white power record label

- Founded: 1998
- Founder: Anthony Pierpont; Ed Wolbank; Eric Davidson
- Defunct: 2005
- Status: Defunct
- Genre: Rock Against Communism
- Country of origin: United States
- Location: Minnesota

Panzerfaust Records was a Minnesota-based white power record label founded in September 1998. Named after a German anti-tank weapon, the record label distributed the music of white power bands and organized concerts across the United States.

At the label's peak around 2000, it was the main competitor of Resistance Records, and they had grown close to the neo-Nazi group White Revolution.

== History ==
Panzerfaust Records was founded in 1998 by Anthony Pierpont, Ed Wolbank and Eric Davidson. The organization had ties to a number of other groups, including Hammerskin Nation (the "largest [US] skinhead group"), Volksfront and White Revolution. In 2003, Bryant Cecchini, a.k.a. Byron Calvert, joined the company.

In 2004, the label launched Project Schoolyard, a United States-wide campaign to distribute free Panzerfaust sampler CDs to middle school and high school students. In response, schools were notified and in some districts, CDs were confiscated or voluntarily turned over by students. The anti-fascist record label Insurgence Records responded by offering a free downloadable compilation called Project Boneyard.

Panzerfaust Records shut down in early 2005 after the arrest of Pierpont for drug possession upon returning from a sex tourism trip to Thailand, and the emergence of evidence that Pierpont was of Hispanic descent and had dated transgender individuals and non-white women. The company was reorganized without Pierpont to become Free Your Mind Productions but disbanded for good shortly after. Pierpont has since supposedly moved away from racism and the white power movement.

As of January 27, 2005, the Panzerfaust website was no longer operating.

== See also ==
- List of record labels
