= Ben Klassen =

American white supremacist (1918–1993)

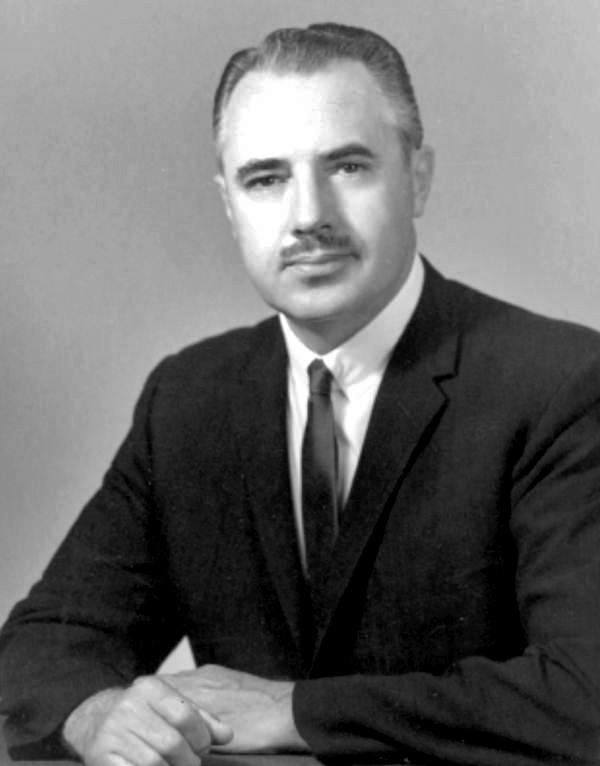
- Klassen in 1966

Pontifex Maximus (of the Church of the Creator)

Member of the Florida House of Representatives from the Broward County district
- In office November 1966 – March 1967

Personal details
- Born: Bernhardt Klassen; February 20, 1918 Rudnerweide, Ukrainian People's Republic, Soviet Union
- Died: August 6, 1993 (aged 75) Otto, North Carolina, U.S.
- Spouse: Henrie Etta McWilliams (m. 1946)
- Education: University of Saskatchewan (attended); University of Manitoba (B.Sc., 1943)

Religious life
- Religion: Creativity

Senior posting
- Period in office: 1973–1993
- Successor: Richard McCarty

Bernhardt "Ben" Klassen (February 20, 1918 (O.S. February 7, 1918) – August 6, 1993) was an American white supremacist politician and writer who founded the Creativity new religious movement when he published the book Nature's Eternal Religion in 1973. Klassen was openly racist, antisemitic and anti-Christian and coined the white supremacist slogan "RaHoWa" (Racial Holy War).

Klassen was a Republican Florida state legislator for several months, as well as a supporter of George Wallace's presidential campaign. In addition to his religious and political work, Klassen was an electrical engineer and was the inventor of a wall-mounted electric can-opener; he was also the co-founder of Silver Springs, Nevada. Klassen held unorthodox views about dieting and health. He was a natural hygienist who opposed the germ theory of disease as well as conventional medicine and promoted a fruitarian, raw food diet.

== Early life and education ==
Bernhardt Klassen was born on February 20, 1918 (O.S. February 7, 1918), in Rudnerweide, Ukraine, to a Russian Mennonite Christian couple. He had two sisters and two brothers. Due to the Russian Civil War, circumstances during his early childhood were quite difficult, with Klassen and his family facing typhoid fever and famine. When he was five, the family moved to Mexico, where they lived for one year in a Mennonite colony. In 1925, at age six, he moved with his family to Herschel, Saskatchewan, Canada. He attended the German-English Academy (now Rosthern Junior College), then the Saskatoon Normal School. His native language being German, he sometimes had difficulty in the Canadian public education system.

In 1935, he enrolled at the University of Saskatchewan; while enrolled there, he became an atheist. He left the university in 1937 to return to the Saskatoon Normal School. He worked as a teacher there, but experienced difficulties; in one instance, a got into a fistfight with two of his students. This contributed to him leaving the school and returning to the university by the next year. In 1938, he read Adolf Hitler's Mein Kampf and found it influential. With World War II having ruined his plans to study in Germany, he enrolled in the University of Manitoba and received a degree in electrical engineering in 1943. Throughout the war, he maintained sympathies for Nazi Germany, though joined the Canadian Officers' Training Corps.

== Entrepreneurship ==
After receiving his degree in electrical engineering, he worked for a time as an electrical engineer for Northern Electric in Montreal. In 1945, Klassen moved to Los Angeles, where he met Henrie Etta McWilliams. They married in 1946. The couple had one child, a daughter, born in 1951.

Klassen established a real estate firm there in partnership with Ben Burke. Believing that his partner was prone to drinking and gambling, Klassen eventually bought him out and became sole proprietor. Merle S. Peek was one of several salesmen hired by Klassen to help him with his business; Peek encouraged Klassen to invest in land development in Nevada. Klassen and Peek started a partnership called the Silver Springs Land Company, establishing Silver Springs, Nevada. In 1952, Klassen, who came to greatly dislike Peek, sold his share of the company to Phillip Hess for $150,000 and retired.

On March 26, 1956, Klassen filed an application with the U.S. Patent Office to patent a wall-mounted, electric can opener marketing it as Canolectric, which, alongside his real estate development, made him quite wealthy. It sold about 50,000 units. In partnership with the marketing firm Robbins & Myers, Klassen created Klassen Enterprises, Inc. In the face of competition from larger manufacturers that could provide similar products more cheaply, Klassen and his partners dissolved the company in 1962.

== Political career ==
Klassen moved to Florida with his family in 1958. Like many influential white supremacists, Klassen was for a time a member of the John Birch Society (JBS). He joined the Society in 1963, at one point operating an American Opinion bookstore. Klassen served Broward County in the Florida House of Representatives from November 1966 – March 1967, running on an anti-busing, anti-government platform. He campaigned for election to the Florida Senate in 1967, but was defeated. His anti-civil rights stance and anti-Jewish politics brought both press criticism and criticism from other JBS members. Klassen's seat in the Florida House was lost by redistricting the same year. He proceeded to become vice chairman of an organization in Florida which supported George Wallace's presidential bid.

Klassen became increasingly dissatisfied that his political associates did not consider Jews the major political problem, rather than liberals or communists; though in private, many JBS members took a similar antisemitic stance, it was considered that public antisemitism would destroy the JBS. Disillusioned with the Society because of what he viewed as its tolerant position towards Jews, Klassen resigned from the JBS in 1969. Klassen looked into a variety of more extreme white supremacist groups, including the National Socialist White People's Party, the World Union of National Socialists, the National States' Rights Party, Gerald L. K. Smith's organizations, and the Ku Klux Klan, but did not join them. Instead, he decided to found his own organization.

In November 1970, Klassen, along with Austin Davis, created the Nationalist White Party (NWP), charted in Florida. The party's platform was explicitly racial in nature, though also involved Christianity; it described itself as an organization for "white Christian people who conquered America [and] don't intend to be relegated to second class citizenship." They had a 14-point program or "creed", declaring Jews to be the enemy of the white race. The logo of the NWP was a "W" with a crown and a halo over it.

Despite defining the NWP as a Christian organization, less than a year after he created the Nationalist White Party, Klassen began expressing apprehension about Christianity to his connections through letters. These letters were not well received, and they effectively ended the influence of the Nationalist White Party. He soon came to entirely reject Christianity; however, he also came to believe that religion, rather than politics, was the solution. He decided that white people needed a kind of "Aryan Judaism", a "a new religion based on the concepts of preserving the White race, not a rehash of old Jewish shibboleths".

== Church of the Creator ==
In 1973, Klassen founded the Church of the Creator (COTC) with the publication of Nature's Eternal Religion. Individual church members are called Creators, and the religion they practice is called Creativity. The organization was founded August 16, 1973. Klassen used the logo of the Nationalist White Party (the W with a crown and halo) as the logo of the COTC.

In 1982, Klassen established the headquarters of his church in Otto, North Carolina.

In July 1992, George Loeb, a minister in the church, was convicted of murdering a black sailor in Jacksonville, Florida. Fearing that a conviction might mean the loss of 20 acres of land worth about $400,000 in Otto, North Carolina, belonging to the church, Klassen sold it to another white supremacist, William Luther Pierce, author of The Turner Diaries and leader of the National Alliance, for $100,000.

Klassen appointed himself Pontifex Maximus of the church until January 25, 1993, when he transferred the title to Rick McCarty.

== Death ==
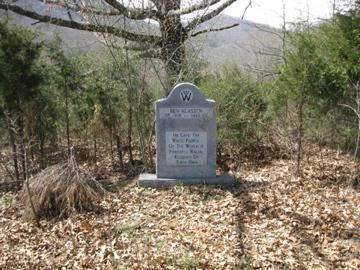
Klassen's headstone

Following the death of his wife, the failure of his church and a diagnosis of cancer, Klassen took an overdose of sleeping pills in an apparent suicide either late on August 6 or early on August 7, 1993, aged 75. He left a suicide note; in it, he referred to a passage in his book The White Man's Bible, where he wrote that it was honorable to end your life if it was no longer worth living.

Klassen was buried on his North Carolina property in an area which he had previously designated "Ben Klassen Memorial Park". On his headstone the message "He gave white people of the world a powerful racial religion of their own" is inscribed.

After his death, he was succeeded as leader by Rick McCarty. The Church of the Creator experienced serious leadership problems for several years. Matthew F. Hale took over in 1995 and renamed it the World Church of the Creator. However, Hale was later sentenced to a 40 year prison sentence for soliciting the murder of a judge. Various smaller groups that practice Creativity still exist, and Klassen's ideas continue to influence the white supremacist movement.

== Views ==
Klassen was openly racist, antisemitic and anti-Christian. Klassen firmly opposed religion because he believed it was superstitious, and he described Christianity as a "Jewish creation" which was designed to unhinge white people by promoting a "completely perverted attitude" about life and nature. He rejected the afterlife as "nonsense". However, Klassen also criticized atheism because he believed it failed to offer a proper alternative philosophy and meaning from religion. He argued that man's morality and sense of purpose is based on the laws of nature and racial loyalty. Klassen believed that the white race was the sole builder of civilization and all of the advanced civilizations which existed in antiquity were created by white people but they were destroyed because they practiced miscegenation. He coined the phrase "my race is my religion"; he believed that white people were carriers of divine DNA. In his ideology, Klassen disliked an "over-intellectualizing" of racial matters; one of the only other white supremacist writers he appreciated was William Gayley Simpson, the author of the 1978 book Which Way Western Man?

Klassen wrote that those whites who he considered "race traitors" therefore committed "divine treason" and would die in the RaHoWa (Racial Holy War). Ben Klassen coined the term "Racial Holy War" (RaHoWa) within the white nationalist movement. In his 1987 book RAHOWA! This Planet Is All Ours he claims that Jews created Christianity in order to make white people weaker, and he said that the first priority should be to "smash the Jewish Behemoth". The term RaHoWa became widely popular among various kinds of white supremacists, not just Creativity adherents.

Klassen was also a natural hygienist who promoted a back to nature philosophy that espoused fresh air, clean water, sunshine and outdoor exercise. He recommended a raw food diet which consisted of fruits and vegetables and believed that medicine and processed foods create cancer inside the body. Klassen wrote that food must be "uncooked, unprocessed, unpreserved and not tampered with in any other way. This further means it must be organically grown without the use of chemicals."

Klassen promoted "racial health" and natural hygiene principles. Klassen believed that fasting would cleanse the body of toxins, and he also believed that a fruitarian raw food diet would cure disease. Klassen rejected the germ theory of disease and believed that modern medicine was a Jewish multi-billion-dollar fraud. Klassen contributed an introduction and a chapter on eugenics to Arnold DeVries' book Salubrious Living (1982). The book endorsed fasting, sunbathing, fruitarian and raw food dieting. Historian George Michael has written that "despite his advocacy of healthy nutrition, some of his associates claimed that in practice Klassen did not actually follow the "salubrious living" regimen, because he often ate red meat and ice cream."

== Bibliography ==
- Nature's Eternal Religion (1973)
- The White Man's Bible (1981)
- Salubrious Living (with Arnold DeVries, 1982)
- Expanding Creativity (1985)
- Building a Whiter and Brighter World (1986)
- RAHOWA! This Planet Is All Ours (1987)
- The Klassen Letters: Volume One, 1969–1976 (1988)
- The Klassen Letters: Volume Two, 1976–1981 (1989)
- A Revolution of Values Through Religion (1991)
- The Fittle White Book (1991)
- Against the Evil Tide (1991)
- On the Brink of a Bloody Racial War (1993)
- Trials, Tribulations and Triumphs (1993)
