= Creativity (religion) =

White supremacist new religious movement

- Emblem of Creativity

Founder
- Ben Klassen

Regions with significant populations
- Midwestern United States; Texas; Montana; Eastern Europe; Australia; United Kingdom

Scriptures
- Nature's Eternal Religion; The White Man's Bible; Salubrious Living; "Expanding Creativity"; "Building a Whiter and Brighter World"; "RAHOWA! This Planet Is All Ours"; "Klassen Letters, Volumes One and Two"; "A Revolution Of Values Through Religion"; "Against The Evil Tide"; "On The Brink Of A Bloody Racial War"; "Trials, Tribulations And Triumphs"; "Little White Book"

Creativity is an atheistic new religious movement espousing white separatism, antitheism, antisemitism, anti-Christianity, and religious/philosophical naturalism. Creativity is an openly racist religion urging for "White pride" and has been classified as a hate group by the Southern Poverty Law Center and the Anti-Defamation League. It was established in Lighthouse Point, Florida, United States, by Ben Klassen as the religion of his Church of the Creator (COTC) in 1973. It now has a presence in several states of the U.S. as well as Australia, Eastern Europe, and the United Kingdom.

Creativity was initially the religion of Klassen's COTC. After his death in 1993, he was succeeded as leader by Matthew F. Hale (who renamed it the New Church of the Creator, then the World Church of the Creator). When Hale was arrested and sentenced to 40 years in prison in 2003, two groups were created that continue to uphold the religion: the Creativity Alliance (CA also known as the Church of Creativity), and the Creativity Movement.

Creativity claims a naturalistic and racialistic worldview, based on the "survival, expansion and advancement of the White race", according to what the group classifies as the "eternal laws of nature, the experience of history, on logic and common sense". Members of the group believe in a "racial holy war" between "white and non-white races", such as Jews, black people, and mixed-race people.

== History ==
=== Under Klassen (1973–1992) ===
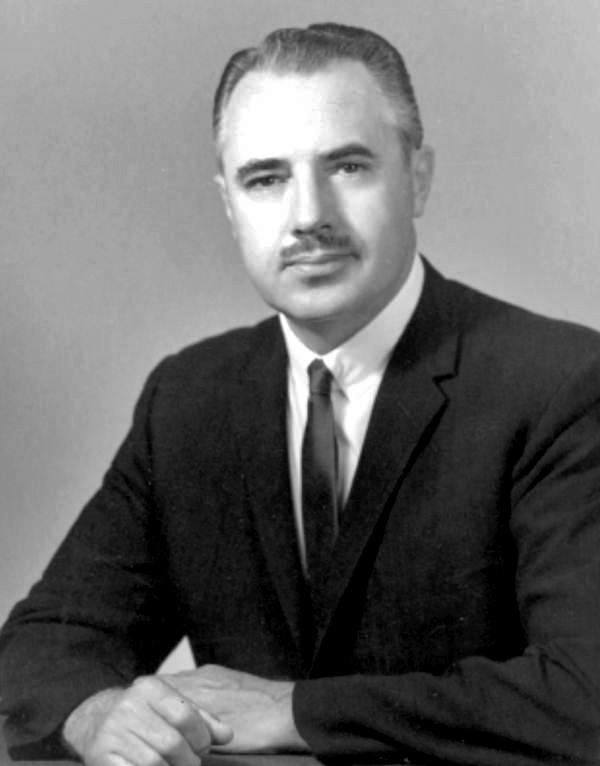
Ben Klassen, the founder of Creativity

Creativity was originally founded as the religion of the "Church of the Creator" by Ben Klassen in 1973, when he self-published Nature's Eternal Religion. Adherents of Creativity refer to themselves as Creators, a term derived from Hitler's autobiographical manifesto Mein Kampf, wherein his classification of "races" falls into three categories, with the "white race", deemed the "Master race", termed the "creators". Klassen attempted to recruit neo-Nazis into the church because, apart from disagreements over Nazism's embrace of Positive Christianity, its insistence on nationalism (rather than racialism), anti-Slavic and other sentiments against non-Germanic European ethnic groups, Klassen highly revered Adolf Hitler as a "great pioneer" and Nazism as admirable in many contexts.

In 1982, Klassen established a Creativity headquarters in Otto, North Carolina. Although his family expected resistance from local residents, Klassen wrote: "We were not quite prepared for the viciousness of the onslaught by the local paper." Opposition grew, and a May 13, 1982 Franklin Press headline read: "Pro-Hitler, anti-Christ Leader Headquarters Here". William White Williams was the second in command of the COTC, "hasta primus", from 1988. Williams left the COTC about a year after he joined, in 1989. Both Williams and his life left the COTC separately; he and his wife later divorced. In Klassen's final book, he devoted a critical chapter to his experiences with Williams and his wife.

=== Legal problems, Klassen's death, and reorganization (1992–1996) ===
In 1992, faced with financial and legal problems (including a civil lawsuit filed by the Southern Poverty Law Center) and the death of his wife, the aging Klassen looked for a successor. Although Rudolph G. ("Butch") Stanko was previously favored for the position, he declined. Klassen selected Charles Edward Altvater, but replaced him before he could assume leadership; he then chose Milwaukee neo-Nazi Mark Wilson, who ran the church from July 1992 to January 1993. Klassen abruptly replaced Wilson with Richard McCarty, having to quell a schism from Wilson's faction. He sold most of the church's property to the National Alliance's William Luther Pierce for $100,000. Pierce quickly sold the property to an unaffiliated third party for $185,000.

In August 1993, Klassen died of suicide at the age of 75 on the grounds of the Creativity headquarters in Otto by taking an overdose of sleeping pills. This followed the death of his wife and a diagnosis of cancer. He left a suicide note; in it, he referred to a passage in his book The White Man's Bible, where he wrote that it was honorable to end your life if it was no longer worth living. Unlike other religions such as Judaism or Christianity, Klassen's Creativity religion does not believe that suicide is a sin and in circumstances such as that faced by its founder Klassen in the early 1990s, is considered a suitable way to die. Klassen was buried on his Creativity headquarters at Otto with his grave in an area that he had already previously designated as "Ben Klassen Memorial Park".

Shortly before and during McCarty's leadership, Creativity was plagued with legal problems; members were arrested for conspiracy, unlawful firearms possession and their association with the July 1993 firebombing of an NAACP building in Tacoma, Washington. McCarty struggled to keep the group unified. The lawsuit filed by the Southern Poverty Law Center (SPLC), seeking damages related to the May 1991 murder of Harold Mansfield, Jr. by Creator George Loeb, finally led to a March 1994 court ruling which fined the Church of the Creator $1,000,000.

=== Under Hale (1996–2003) ===
In 1996, Matthew F. Hale, along with other ministers of the original Church of the Creator, formed a successor group, initially known as the "New Church of the Creator ", then the "World Church of the Creator". Hale made national news when he was denied admission to the Illinois State Bar on three occasions due to his beliefs. On November 12, 1999, the Illinois Supreme Court refused to further consider the denial of Hale's law license, continuing "a decision by its Committee on Character and Fitness that said Hale lacked the moral character to practice law." According to Hale, the committee's denial of his law license may have provoked Benjamin Nathaniel Smith's drive-by shooting spree.

During this period, the Canadian musician George Burdi, also known as George Eric Hawthorne, was lead singer of the Canadian metal band RaHoWa, leader of the Toronto branch of the Church of the Creator, and founder of Resistance Records, an influential white power music record label. Burdi has been credited with a role in Creativity's survival after the death of Ben Klassen. He was later convicted of assault, and claimed he renounced racism after serving time in prison.

Hale's right to use the name "Church of the Creator" in the United States was lost to an unaffiliated religious organization based in Ashland, Oregon, in a trademark infringement case. In 2000 the Oregon-based TE-TA-MA Truth Foundation filed a lawsuit against the World Church of the Creator for using the name "Church of the Creator", since the Oregon group had trademarked and registered the name in 1982. U.S. District Court Judge Joan Lefkow ruled for the World Church of the Creator. In December 2002, the World Church of the Creator was fined $1,000 for each day it continued using the old name. Further appeals were denied by the U.S. Supreme Court in 2003.

In January 2003, Hale was arrested and charged with attempting to direct security chief Anthony Evola to murder judge Lefkow; he was convicted and sentenced to 40 years' imprisonment. Bill White was convicted of threatening a juror in the Matthew Hale case and sentenced to 42 months in prison.

=== After Hale (2003–present) ===
Following the demise of the World Church of the Creator after Hale's arrest in 2003, the movement schismed into two groups with common origins. There formed two distinct groups, known as "The Creativity Movement" and the "Creativity Alliance" or "Church of Creativity".

==== Creativity Movement ====
Hale's faction was succeeded by an organization called the Creativity Movement. Initially led by Adam Daniel Jacobs, he was later arrested in 2005. He was replaced by James Logsdon. Unsatisfied with his leadership, another schism formed, "The Church of the RaHoWa".

Headquartered in Zion, Illinois, with a heavy concentration of Creators in Montana, and 24 regional branches, it also claims to have local branches and members "all over the world".

==== Creativity Alliance ====
In 2007, members of the Creativity Movement formed a schism, the Creativity Alliance. According to a Southern Poverty Law Center report, in 2015, the Creativity Alliance had groups in Georgia, Pennsylvania, South Carolina, Utah and Vermont. Creativity Alliance web pages and published books stress that they make no attempt to assume or supersede the registered trademark "Church of the Creator", owned by the TE-TA-MA Truth Foundation.

Randolph Dilloway, former Hasta Primus (Secretary, or second in command) of the Creativity Alliance and founder of the defunct Smoky Mountains Church of Creativity, was an accountant for the revived National Alliance who assessed the financial damage which was done to that organization by its past leadership. Claiming to fear for his life after he discovered (and discussed) the errors, Dilloway contacted police and the SPLC and in 2015 he also furnished them with documents in which he alleged that members of the National Alliance committed fraud and embezzlement.

In March 2015, leaflets which contained the slogan: "The white race is nature’s finest" were posted on doors in southern Liverpool, in the United Kingdom. Cailen Cambeul, Creativity minister and then the Pontifex Maximus of the Creativity Alliance, stated that he was responsible for the distribution of the leaflets. Complaints were lodged to the police by local councilors. Sarah Jennings of the local Green Party denounced Creativity as a "fringe group of blatant racists". According to Cambeul, "Any politician claiming disgust at our flyers and seeking to make political gains via our 100-percent-legal message is partaking in an opportunistic abuse of power at the expense of innocent people exercising their rights to speak out against the injustices of a politically correct world."

Creativity Alliance members are known to regularly distribute flyers; in 2017, the Creativity Alliance was found to be responsible for the distribution of flyers throughout Pittsburgh, Pennsylvania. In the United States, northwest Montana, particularly the Flathead Valley, has seen the distribution of a "flurry of racist fliers" which promote the Creativity movement. The Southern Poverty Law Center listed Creativity Alliance presence in the state in 2015. They frequently distribute flyers in Australia and New Zealand. In 2015, the CA distributed flyers in Inverbervie (Scotland) and Liverpool.

The Attorney-General of South Australia and the Minister for Multicultural Affairs have made a number of attempts to close the website of the South Australian representative and Pontifex Maximus of the Creativity Alliance and outlaw the organization. Cambeul filed a complaint with the Australian Press Council that describing the Creativity Alliance as a white-supremacist organization (rather than a religion) and characterizing its members as "a few loners looking for something to do with all their hate" was unfair. His complaint was dismissed on the basis that the journalist's assessment was not a news article but an opinion piece.

== Beliefs and membership ==
Flag of Creativity. The red field symbolizes the struggle for the survival, expansion, and advancement of the white race, and the fly-side white triangle represents a "whiter and brighter world".

White separatism is fundamental to Creativity, and as such, adherents of it are taught to hate non-whites and avoid social interactions with them. Adherents of the religion are also expected to refute homosexuality, miscegenation and complaining. Membership in the Creativity Movement is restricted to persons whose genetic heritage is "wholly or predominantly" from Europe, or members of the white race, regardless of where they reside.

The leader of the entire Creativity religion is called the "Pontifex Maximus", Latin for "Greatest Priest" and a title derived from its usage from Ancient Rome. The first Pontifex Maximus in the Creativity religion was Klassen himself.

Creativity has "Sixteen Commandments" and "Five Fundamental Beliefs", which adherents are supposed to recite five times a day, including the belief that "their race is their religion", their belief that the white race is "nature's finest creation", their belief that racial loyalty is the "greatest honor" and their belief that racial treason is the "worst crime", their belief that anything which is beneficial to white people is good and their belief that anything which is detrimental to white people is bad, and their belief that white people should avoid business dealings with Jews and refuse to "employ niggers or other coloreds". Klassen's Little White Book declares that Creativity is the "one and only, true and revolutionary White racial religion", repudiating other racist religions such as Christian Identity and Wotanism.

Klassen was a racist who hated all black people and was very open about his contempt for them. In public discourse as well as in his writings, Klassen consistently referred to black people with the racial slur "nigger" and required that all followers of his religion use that word to refer to black people rather than non-derogatory terms such as "black" or "African American". Klassen also condemned other racists who used less offensive terms such as "negro", stating in print that "Furthermore, in looking up the word in Webster's dictionary I found the term 'nigger' very descriptive: 'a vulgar, offensive term of hostility and contempt for the black man'. I can't think of anything that defines better and more accurately what our position... should be... If we are going to be for racial integrity and racial purity... we must take a hostile position toward the nigger. We must give him nothing but contempt."

The religion advocates the belief that American culture is becoming "more decadent", citing an increase in the number of "black crimes, the growing acceptance of homosexuality, interracial marriage, increasing drug use, and the lack of racial identity among white people" as evidence of its increasing decadence. According to the Anti-Defamation League, members believe that Jewish people are working towards the enslavement of all races, and in particular, they believe that the Jews are working towards the "mongrelization of the white race". During the early 2000s, the group was encouraged to move to Central Illinois in order to establish a "Creativity bastion" (i.e., a place where Creators are the majority demographic).

=== Diet ===
Klassen was a natural hygienist who recommended a strict fruitarian and raw vegan diet known as "Salubrious Living" which consisted of organically grown fruits, grains, nuts and vegetables. He commented that food should be "uncooked, unprocessed, unpreserved and not tampered with in any other way. This further means it must be organically grown without the use of chemicals." Klassen argued that humans are frugivores and distinguished his fruitarian diet to vegetarianism, but included nuts and seeds as a supply of protein. However, Klassen himself did not follow all the rules of his health regime. Historian George Michael has noted that "despite his advocacy of healthy nutrition, some of his associates claimed that in practice Klassen did not actually follow the "salubrious living" regimen, because he often ate red meat and ice cream. (Klassen believed in the full-implementation of Salubrious Living as part of the "advancement-stage" goals of Creativity with the diet being a personal choice for adherents and not as a prerequisite for membership in his group.)

Creativity Alliance continues to advocate Klassen's raw vegan diet and argues against the use of all drugs, including "artificial medications", in favor of "natural remedies". Creativity members are purported to follow their own anti-Semitic version of "kosher" dietary laws in which pork, shellfish and catfish are strictly forbidden.

=== Afterlife and supernatural ===
Creativity rejects supernaturalism, affirming a metaphysical naturalist worldview. According to its founder Ben Klassen, a member is "not superstitious and disdains belief in the supernatural... [not giving] credence to, or playing silly games with imaginary spooks, spirits, gods and demons." Members do not believe that Nature is a conscious entity, but hold to a naturalistic pantheist view of "everything [is] in Nature"—"the whole cosmos, the total universe, including its millions of natural laws through space and time".

Members reject the concept of an afterlife believing that individual genetic "immortality" is attained through reproduction and legacy, with a cessation of consciousness of the individual at death. Creativity upholds collectivism over individualism and teaches that life and death on Earth should be viewed in a "rational, fearless manner". Members believe that the purpose of life is "the survival, expansion and advancement" of the white race with "continuance of the individual" attained through heredity and the legacy left to future generations.

Whereas Klassen was classified as an atheist, and Creativity has been labelled atheistic by the press, he objected to the usage of the term considering it a derogatory smear word without meaning employed by believers in what he termed "non-existent spooks in the sky" while stating that the "organized atheist movements" lacked any "positive creed and program of its own to replace the superstitions it seeks to destroy" while stating that most of the atheist movements in existence at the time did not take any pro-white racial stance and that many of them were under "heavy Jewish influence". Citing commonality, Klassen stated that both "atheism and Creativity deplore and denounce any and all supernatural beliefs, claims and superstitions. We do not believe in gods, devils, spooks, spirits, heaven or hell. We denounce all such hocus-pocus as being invented by men, largely for the purpose of controlling their minds and worldly affairs and extracting the utmost financial gain from them."

=== Racial socialism ===
The Southern Poverty Law Center classifies Creativity as a neo-Nazi ideology. According to Klassen, Creativity is not a rehash of Nazism; as evidence of this fact, he listed eight differences which exist between the two political ideologies. He adopted the phrase "racial socialism" to describe his political ideology. Klassen was critical of democracy and advocated meritocracy, believing that effective leaders should rule. Under racial socialism, "whites would work together toward common goals but without the massive economic planning in the style of the Soviet Gosplan". He supported a limited market economy, believing that social and economic activities should be in the best interests of white people. Klassen criticized "leftist proclivities" to recruit from the white working class: "All [white] members of the national or racial community ... had an important role to play."

Klassen urged members of Creativity to "work feverishly and aggressively to organize politically, to distribute literature on behalf of the White Race, to promote and foster White solidarity, and to get control of the government and the political machinery of the state by legal means if possible. If this is not possible by legal means, then we must resort to the same means as our forefathers used two hundred years ago to defend their liberty, their property, their homes and their families."

=== Activism ===
Creativity engages in proselytism with the stated goal of placing 10 million copies of two books, Nature's Eternal Religion and The White Man's Bible, into the hands of white people as part of its belief in "gird[ing] up for total war".

According to the Ontario Consultants on Religious Tolerance, the Creativity Movement opposes illegal activity and violence, believing it to be counterproductive. The group's member handbook threatens expulsion from the group for members who commit crimes or encourage others to do so. Despite this, the group has been connected to multiple religiously- and racially motivated violent crimes. Members of the group view "racial holy war" (Rahowa) as a religious war of racial self-defense. The White Man's Bible states the belief that a Zionist Occupational Government will prevent Creativity from being promoted legally, and tells its readers that "when that stage arrives (and we can well expect that our Jewish tyrants will push us to the limit), then we must again plan our actions accordingly—and deliberately, carefully and ruthlessly", calling for readers to, "use any means, legal or otherwise, available to us for our own survival," leading to the hunting down and eliminating of the group's "tormentors".

== Practices ==
=== Holidays ===
The religion has several holidays. Creators are encouraged to observe them, spending time with their families and friends of the religion:

- South Victory Day (January 26): Commemorates the arrival of the First Fleet to the Australian continent in 1788.
- Klassen Day (February 20): Anniversary of its founder's birth in 1918.
- Founding Day (February 21): Anniversary of the publication of Nature’s Eternal Religion in 1973.
- Foundation Day, Rahowa Day (March 20): Anniversary of the foundation of the World Center in 1982 and a reminder of racial war.
- Kozel Day, Martyr's Day (September 15): Commemorates Brian Kozel, a movement member who was killed in a fight with Mexicans on this date in 1990.
- Festum Album (December 26 – January 1): Week-long celebration of white racial pride, commemorating the massacre at Wounded Knee. December 29, the anniversary of the massacre is also celebrated as "West Victory Day".

=== Ceremonies ===
Creativity has four life cycle ceremonies: The Creator Wedding Ceremony, the Creator Child Pledging Ceremony, the Ceremony of Confirmation of Loyalty to the White Race, and The Saying of Goodbyes to our Departed Brethren. Ceremonies are performed by church ministers. At a wedding, the bride and groom exchange vows before "Nature" and the congregation. The pledging ceremony is ideally conducted within two weeks after a child's birth, with both parents pledging to raise their child as a "loyal member of the White Race and faithful to the church." The confirmation ceremony is to ideally performed on the child's 13th birthday. The eulogy ceremony is up to the kin of the deceased with cremation an accepted method of disposition of the body.

=== Ministers ===
Klassen strove for every member to engage in recruitment and as such, granted "Ministerial Certificates" to "any legitimate White Man or Woman over the age of 16" who convinced church leadership that they were "dedicated to the noble cause of the White Race". Prospective ministers must demonstrate worthiness and pass written and oral examinations. The written exam designed by Matt Hale consisted of 149 questions and an essay with the final requirement the signing of an oath.

== Books ==
The two main texts behind Creativity are Nature's Eternal Religion and The White Man's Bible, written by Klassen in 1973. The books teach that the white race is the "pinnacle of Nature's creation", "nature's finest" and outlined a foundation for a "white racial religion". Section one of the first book critiques Christianity, black people as a "plague" and Jewish people as "parasitical masters of deceit". Many biblical stories, including those of Adam and Eve, Jonah and the whale and the resurrection of Jesus, are critiqued extensively in successive books penned by Klassen. The historicity of Jesus is denied, with Klassen affirming his belief in the Christ myth theory, a fringe ideology which claims that Jesus, the founder and central figure of Christianity was not a historical figure but was instead a fictional character. According to Creativity, Christianity is a violent religion which has killed 1,000 fellow Christians for every Christian killed by the Romans.

Adherents reject Christian teachings such as the Sermon on the Mount and Christian pacifism as leading to "racial suicide" and Christianity as having been formulated by Jews to destroy the Roman Empire with Islam being a "militant religion" having been formed as a Jewish plot to "mobilize the mud races" to invade and conquer Europe. They reject the exhortation in the Bible's Matthew 5:44 to "love one's enemies", believing that enemies should be hated, if not destroyed. In section two of the first text, Klassen went about laying the foundation for a "racial religion" to "replace Christ-Insanity" (as he referred to Christianity). In it, members are to reject the Golden Rule, saying that it does not make "good sense" and at a "closer look" it is a "completely unworkable principle" replacing it with its own "Golden Rule": What is good for the white race is the highest virtue and what is bad for the white race is the ultimate sin; racial loyalty is the greatest of all honors and racial treason is the worst of all crimes.

Klassen published an additional 11 books including Expanding Creativity, Building a Whiter and Brighter World and Rahowa! This Planet Is All Ours.

== Other legal cases ==
Creativity was recognized as a religion by the United States District Court for the Eastern District of Wisconsin in Peterson v. Wilmur Communications (205 F.Supp.2d 1014) (2002). The American Civil Liberties Union intervened on behalf of the World Church of the Creator.

California federal judge Maxine M. Chesney ruled against an imprisoned Creator who brought a suit against Pelican Bay State Prison based on an alleged violation of the Religious Land Use and Institutionalized Persons Act in Conner v. Tilton, 2009 U.S. Dist. LEXIS 111892 (ND CA, Dec. 2, 2009), in which Creativity and several other organizations and belief systems (including MOVE, veganism and the Church of Marijuana) were declared to not constitute "religions" but moral or secular philosophies under the definition of religion based on addressing of "fundamental and ultimate questions having to do with deep and imponderable matters" as part of a three-point test for determining religion developed by the United States Court of Appeals for the Third Circuit. The court concluded that the plaintiff had failed to raise a genuine issue about whether Creativity is a religion; it found that to the extent Creativity deals with a "fundamental concern", the concern is with secular matters and not with what the court considered to be religious principles. Creativity is not "comprehensive" in nature because it was presented as confined to one question (or moral teaching), and that the structural characteristics of Creativity "do not serve to transform what are otherwise secular teachings and ideals into a religious ideology." In Hale v. Federal Bureau of Prisons (2015), the court found that Creativity may qualify as a religion under the First Amendment to the United States Constitution (with potential tax exemption by the IRS) and may be practiced in prison.

Furthermore, on March 12, 1989, U.S. federal judge Fern M. Smith of the United States District Court for the Northern District of California ordered San Quentin prison authorities to return "The White Man's Bible" to an inmate after it was confiscated and the state failed to prove that the book presented an imminent danger.

== See also ==
- List of fascist movements
- List of neo-Nazi organizations
- List of white nationalist organizations
- Radical right (Europe)
- Radical right (United States)
