= National Vanguard =

National Vanguard may refer to:

- National Vanguard (magazine), an American white nationalist magazine
- National Vanguard (Italy), at least two neo-fascist groups of the 1960s and 1970s
- National Vanguard Books, American white supremacist publisher
- National Vanguard (white nationalist group), an American white nationalist and neo-Nazi organization that existed from 2005 to 2007
