= Philip Cary =

Phil(l)ip Car(e)y may refer to:

- Philip Cary (MP, died 1631) of Woodstock, member of House of Commons between 1614 and 1625
- Philip Cary (MP, died 1437) of Cockington, Devon, Member of Parliament for Devon in 1433
- Philip Cary (officer of arms) (1895–1968)
- Phillip Cary (born 1958), philosophy professor
- Philip Carey (1925–2009), American actor
- Philip J. Carey, American judge and politician
- Kevin Alfred Strom (born 1956), American neo-Nazi, who used the name Phillip Carey to operate his radio show
