= Serpent's Walk =

1991 novel by M. A. R. Barker

- Cover of the first edition, by DB Graphics
- Author: M. A. R. Barker (using the pseudonym Randolph D. Calverhall)
- Language: English
- Genre: Science fiction
- Publisher: National Vanguard Books
- Publication date: 1991
- Publication place: United States
- Media type: Print
- Pages: 449
- ISBN: 0-937944-05-X
- OCLC: 28173024
- LC Class: MLCS 93/04796

Serpent's Walk is a neo-Nazi science fiction novel written by M. A. R. Barker, published under the pseudonym Randolph D. Calverhall. It was published in 1991 by National Vanguard Books, the book publishing division of the neo-Nazi group the National Alliance. The book features an alternate history where SS soldiers begin an underground resistance after the end of WWII; the protagonist, Alan Lessing, eventually becomes the Führer and worldwide dictator of the Fourth Reich, following a pandemic that eliminates millions. The book espouses a belief in an international Jewish conspiracy and extensively quotes Mein Kampf. The book saw some popularity with far-right extremists, though far less than the more notorious book The Turner Diaries, also published by National Vanguard Books. Scholars have noted it as more literary than The Turner Diaries, with a heavier focus on science fiction.

Barker was a science fiction and fantasy writer known for his creation of the fictional universe of Tékumel. As Serpent's Walk was published under a pseudonym, his authorship of the work was publicly unknown until 2022, though Barker's Tékumel Foundation found out after his death in 2012. Prior to the reveal of Barker's authorship, one theory was that it was written by William Luther Pierce, the author of The Turner Diaries and the leader of the National Alliance. In 2018, scholar Amina Inloes alluded to the book in a piece on Barker, but did not mention it by name; in March 2022, the Tékumel Foundation confirmed that Barker had authored the book, and they repudiated Barker's views and apologized for not having acknowledged his authorship earlier.

== Plot summary ==
The story begins in 2041. The protagonist, Alan Lessing, is a veteran of the Middle Eastern Baalbek War. He is a mercenary for the Indoco chemical corporation and is based in India; the whole world has stagnated and is slowly becoming entirely controlled by corporations. He is initially wholly apolitical, a "racial agnostic", and has an Indian girlfriend, Jameela. While he is uncertain of their future, he cares for her. The story begins with Lessing leading a heist on a supposedly deactivated base carrying a biological weapon called Pacov. Following their visit to the base, Lessing's team are assassinated one by one, and Lessing realizes that he is next.

Lessing visits the house of another Indoco worker, Hermann Mulder, but intruders slip onto the property. Lessing kills one, but the intruder opens Mulder's safe, and within Lessing finds a trove of Schutzstaffel (SS, the Nazi paramilitary organization) books, dated 1948–1955, after its dissolution. Two of Mulder's associates tell Lessing that the SS had secretly survived, and that they are members. They explain to him its history: several senior officers of the SS (among them Martin Bormann) had escaped to Argentina, bringing with them much of its treasury. They (later renamed the Party of Humankind) used this money and resources to expand in influence across the world in an underground network, particularly hiding out in Third World nations. The SS, realizing the world is heading towards corporate control, slowly gain power through financial influence and company infiltration (including Indoco), slowly pushing their views in the media, planning to eventually wholly control and convince society of their views with the ultimate goal to ethnically segregate the Earth. They also tell him the Holocaust was faked and blame many of society's ills on Jewish people, which Lessing initially argues against. They had previously not bothered to attempt to recruit him due to his apolitical nature, but since he now knows about them, they tell Lessing that he must join or be killed. Initially in disbelief, he eventually agrees to work for them for pay.

Lessing develops an attraction to SS member (and former prostitute) Anneliese Meisinger, and is torn between her and Jameela (who is actually a spy who had not intended to fall in love with him). Mass deaths begin in Eastern Europe using the Pacov bioweapon. The SS take full control, designating Lessing as prime operator of a hyperintelligent artificial intelligence named Eighty-Five, giving him access to and control over it and its ability to survey massive amounts of information. The pandemic spreads to more nations, killing millions, and society descends into chaos. The SS take advantage of the power struggle, taking control of the United States government, trying to work against the Jews. Jameela is murdered by an Israeli, and Lessing proceeds to kill him, swearing vengeance against the Israelis, who capture him and torture him until he tells them what he knows about Pacov. All of them are killed by Pacov, but Lessing survives after taking the only possible cure for Pacov (a type of toxin) in a suicide attempt. It is unknown who released Pacov, but it is eventually realized that it was released by the Israelis attempting to destroy the Soviet Union. Once recovered, he falls in love with Annaliese and becomes a devoted Nazi, and the Party becomes increasingly powerful by de facto controlling the US government, reshaping society in a Nazi image. Later, Lessing becomes the Führer and worldwide dictator of the Fourth Reich. The book ends with Lessing noting that the Fourth Reich looks like it will last a long time, "hopefully forever".

== Background and publication history ==
The novel was published in Hillsboro, West Virginia in 1991 by National Vanguard Books, the book publishing division of the neo-Nazi group the National Alliance. National Vanguard Books published white supremacist and neo-Nazi material, including the notorious work The Turner Diaries, written by the National Alliance's leader, William Luther Pierce. Serpent's Walk and Pierce's novels were the only novels published by National Vanguard Books. Serpent's Walk was one of only four books that were directly sponsored by Pierce, alongside Pierce's own two novels and Which Way Western Man? by William Gayley Simpson.

It is 449 pages long, and the cover art is credited to DB Graphics. The back cover of the book states: "The good guys win sometimes. Not always, of course. They lost big in the Second World War. That was a victory for communists, democrats, and Jews, but everyone else lost." It continues, "A century after the war they are ready to challenge the democrats and Jews for the hearts and minds of White Americans, who have begun to have their fill of government-enforced multi-culturalism and 'equality.'" The novel was distributed in the United Kingdom by Spearhead, the periodical of far-right activist John Tyndall.

Serpent's Walk was authored by science fiction and fantasy writer M. A. R. Barker, better known for his creation of the Tékumel fictional universe. He published five novels set within this universe, with Serpent's Walk an unrelated sixth. It was published under the pseudonym "Randolph D. Calverhall", an allusion to one of Barker's ancestors, and the book is attributed to him in a library catalog. Barker had served as a member of the Editorial Advisory Committee of the Journal of Historical Review, a journal that advocated Holocaust denial.

Barker's authorship of the book was publicly unknown until 2022. Prior to the revelation of Barker's authorship, some believed Serpent's Walk was written by the founder of the National Alliance and author of The Turner Diaries, William Luther Pierce. However, Pierce had used a different pseudonym in writing The Turner Diaries and Hunter (Andrew Macdonald), and the book was not listed in his authorized biography The Fame of a Dead Man's Deeds. Barker's Tékumel Foundation (which controls the IP rights for his works following his death) found out about his authorship of the book after his death in 2012, when an archivist found various items tying Barker to the work, including its manuscript, cover art, proof copies, and the publishing contract. They kept silent about this for roughly a decade. In 2017, scholar John Eric Starnes described it as "written by a science fiction writer who supported William Pierce's efforts".

In 2018, scholar Amina Inloes mentioned the book in an article about Barker for The Muslim World without mentioning its name, referring to it as "a pseudonymous novel" that was nevertheless "clearly Barker's" in both the name of his pseudonym and various literary traits, such as its references to Muslim and South Asian culture, as well as theological and dialogue elements. However as it explored what she called "potentially inflammatory political viewpoints" she said it was "best to preserve the facade of anonymity" and called discussing the book an "ethical dilemma". In March 2022, the Tékumel Foundation confirmed Barker's authorship of Serpent's Walk and association with the Journal of Historical Review. The Foundation repudiated Barker's views in the novel, from which it does not receive royalties, and apologized for not acknowledging its authorship earlier.

== Analysis and influence ==
Serpent's Walk is a dystopian neo-Nazi science fiction story, with plot elements including laser-armed mercenaries and artificial intelligence. The book espouses the belief in an international Jewish conspiracy, suggests the solution to the supposed "Jewish question" is genocide, denies the Holocaust, and extensively quotes Mein Kampf. The SS members are presented as heroes, while it presents Jews as parasitic, and the blame for the pandemic is placed on them, though also on Lessing. J.M. Berger writing for the International Centre for Counter-Terrorism said of the work that it was "a much more ambitious novel than The Turner Diaries, with a heavier focus on science fiction and a much more sophisticated writing style" and called it reminiscent of The Iron Heel, with "lengthy and tedious Socratic discussions of Nazi ideology". He described it as more polemical than Turner; the protagonist Lessing starts as a "racial agnostic" but ends with "a full-blown embrace of Nazism". The Encyclopedia of Science Fiction described Serpent's Walk as "a late and particularly unpleasant example of antisemitism in sf", while writers for the Encyclopaedia Judaica called it an "anti-Jewish tract that resorted to apocalyptic SF-tinged scenarios".

Lyman Tower Sargent listed Serpent's Walk as one of "a few works that have described what the authors see as eutopias from a National Socialist perspective", with the novel's conclusion portrayed as the creation of "what can only be called a fascist eutopia". In 2001, Brad Whitsel noted it as "a rather contemporary example of the National Socialist secular apocalyptic narrative", saying it wove "together the Nazi survival myth with the hope that National Socialism will emerge as the guiding world philosophy in the near-term future". Scholar John Eric Starnes identified it as a white nationalist novel, and more specifically as part of what he identified as the "fourth cycle" of white nationalist novels. He described this as a period where white nationalist literature "started to stake out its territory and define its beliefs, along with pushing the boundaries of free speech and good taste"; he noted it as a book that "would only be read by white nationalists". He wrote that Serpent's Walk contained many elements typical of such books, namely "redemption of the main character/his conversion to white nationalism, a small guerrilla group fighting against overwhelming odds, strong female characters who fight, kill and die 'like men,' etc." Sargent described it, alongside the 1993 novel Hear the Cradle Song, as both modeled after The Turner Diaries and as examples of utopian-styled far-right literature.

Researcher Elana Gomel noted the book in 2000 to have "far more literary pretensions than the blunt Turner Diaries", describing it as "vascillat[ing] between crude eugenicist propaganda" and "apocalyptic scenes of mass dying", with the pandemic becoming the "artistic centerpiece" of the novel. In the latter aspect she compared its imagery to the book The Stand and the film Outbreak. Starnes identified the idea of a "super-virus" that attacks non-white peoples as being an element that appeared in other white nationalist fiction. Far-right activist Jim Saleam described it as demonstrating Pierce's "permanent occult commitment" to the occult Nazi writer Savitri Devi, with the story representing the "aryanist struggles of a hero married to an Indian woman during the downward chaos-phase of the Kali Yuga". Amina Inloes argued the writing quality was "superior" to that of Barker's Tékumel novels, and noted that there was more academic discussion of Serpent's Walk than Tékumel. She noted its extensive discussions of South Asian and Muslim heritage to be typical of Barker's works, as was its quotes and discussion from Arabic literature on warfare and esoteric theory. She argued that any discussion of Barker's work as it intersected with his beliefs should therefore include it.

It is frequently featured on the reading lists of far-right extremists, and in 2004 John Sutherland of The Guardian named it as a novel "beloved by neo-Nazis". In 2004, the Southern Poverty Law Center listed as one of a few popular "extremist novels". Both it and Turner's sequel, Hunter, were found in the possession of conspirators involved in the Oklahoma City bombing. Both books were, however, far less impactful on the far-right than The Turner Diaries. Following the reveal of Barker's authorship of the work, author Stu Horvath excluded Barker's tabletop RPG Empire of the Petal Throne from his 2023 book Monsters, Aliens, and Holes in the Ground: A Guide to Tabletop Roleplaying Games from D&D to Mothership, saying that he was "not interested in having the work of a neo-Nazi propagandist on my shelves, and I am certainly not going to give space to one in my book."
