= Attack! (periodical) =

American white supremacist periodical

- First page of the first issue of Attack!
- Editor: William Luther Pierce (until 1980s); Kevin Alfred Strom (1980s–present)
- Categories: Political
- Frequency: Irregular
- Format: Tabloid, later magazine, later website
- First issue: Fall 1969
- Company: National Youth Alliance (1969–1974); National Alliance (1974–present)
- Country: United States
- Based in: Washington, D.C.
- Language: English
- Website: nationalvanguard.org
- ISSN: 0897-4012
- OCLC: 5042001

National Vanguard, titled Attack! (styled in all caps) until 1978, is a white supremacist magazine and website, previously a tabloid periodical. It was originally established in 1969 as the official periodical of the right-wing youth organization the National Youth Alliance (NYA), founded by Willis Carto. It was edited by the white supremacist William Luther Pierce.

When Pierce and Carto became embroiled in a dispute less than a year later, the group schismed, with Pierce inheriting the NYA name and Attack! in the aftermath. Pierce renamed the group the National Alliance, and renamed the periodical the National Vanguard in 1978, with it changing to a magazine format. The National Vanguard continued to be the National Alliance's main periodical for several decades; after a leadership dispute in the 2000s, the print magazine became defunct, though editor Kevin Alfred Strom continues to operate it as a website.

As Attack!, the periodical contained racist and antisemitic content and "Revolutionary Notes" on firearms and explosives, though it later moved away from the explicitly militant direction and towards broader racist topics. Beginning in the January 1975 issue, Pierce serialized his story The Turner Diaries in the periodical. Owing to the story's popularity with readers, he later published it as a book, which became one of the most influential white supremacist works and inspired several terrorist attacks.

== History ==
=== Origins (1969–1970) ===
Attack! was founded in 1969 as the house publication of the right-wing youth organization the National Youth Alliance (NYA), founded by the far-right activist Willis Carto. It was their official periodical. (Note: Sources variously call Attack! a newspaper, a newsletter, a periodical, or a tabloid. National Vanguard is generally described as a magazine.) The first issue of Attack was released in fall 1969. In 1970, William Luther Pierce joined the NYA; Pierce was a former physicist, previously a member of the National Socialist White People's Party (NSWPP); he had edited the NSWPP's affiliated magazine, National Socialist World. He left the ANP following the assassination of its leader, George Lincoln Rockwell, and joined the NYA.

The paper was launched to help membership in the NYA, which was faltering. Pierce borrowed 2000 dollars from NYA member Louis T. Byers to launch the periodical. Its first issue lists the publisher as Byers and the editor as Carey J. Winters. (Note: Several sources say Pierce started the periodical. Sources are inconsistent on if Attack! was founded by Pierce, or if it was founded before he joined the NYA. He is generally listed as having joined the NYA in 1970, with the periodical starting in 1969. The first issue of Attack! does not mention Pierce.) It was originally published where the NYA was incorporated in Washington, D.C.

Pierce wrote articles for the magazine as "Luther Williams", and was the editor of the magazine by June 1970. Pierce soon became a leader in the group. Carto saw Pierce as a useful leader for the NYA, while Pierce wanted to have an organization to spread his views to colleges. Additionally, Pierce desired to operate a publication for young radicals that was right-wing in orientation, which he found was fulfilled in Attack! Pierce became involved in publishing and editing the paper.

=== Schism, Pierce takeover, and The Turner Diaries (1970–1978) ===
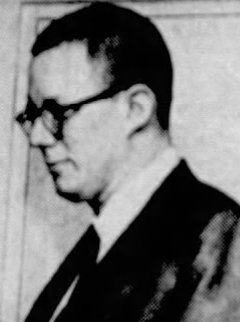
William Luther Pierce in 1970

Less than a year after Pierce joined the NYA, Pierce and Carto had a falling out which split the group. The reasons for this split are disputed; Pierce said Carto had left the organization swamped in debt, which would kill the organization. Following the split, Pierce got the periodical and control of the National Youth Alliance name. After the split, Carto's other paper, Statecraft, accused Pierce of being an FBI agent, while Pierce in turn accused Carto of embezzlement in Attack! Following the dissociation from Carto, the paper took an anti-conservative bent. In 1974, Pierce formed the National Alliance out of his side of the schism.

Whereas before the periodical had focused on practical instructions for violence, in late 1974 fictional stories began to appear. The first of these was entitled "A Parable", and appeared in late 1974. Beginning in the January 1975 issue, Attack! serialized Pierce's story The Turner Diaries in every issue. The story focuses on a group of violent white nationalists overthrowing a government that oppresses white people. The periodical continued to print its typical fare in the meantime, though was during its serialization undergoing a change from a more explicitly violent direction to a more elitist one.

Alongside The Turner Diaries, Attack! serialized a second story, a comic strip called "Future Zero", with similar themes. Issues that ran the Diaries also contained commentary tying it into current events. The story was very popular with readers and members of the National Alliance. Owing to its popularity, when the story was concluded in the periodical, the full story was collected as a paperback book in early 1978 under the pseudonym Andrew MacDonald.

=== As the National Vanguard (1978–) ===
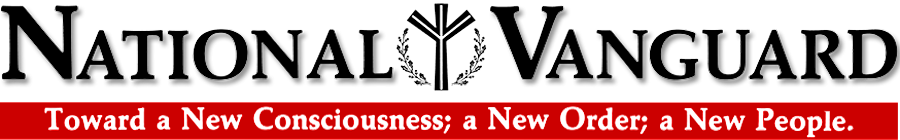
Logo of the National Vanguard magazine

In April 1978, Attack! was renamed the National Vanguard, or, the National Vanguard replaced Attack! The National Vanguard shifted to a glossy magazine format. The publication of the National Vanguard was irregular, and was aimed at members of the National Alliance. The Turner Diaries was sold through the magazine. In 1984, Pierce outlined his racist religious philosophy of Cosmotheism in a National Vanguard article called "A Program for Our Survival", which outlines a three-part plan to appeal to people's racism on a spiritual basis. A book of the "highlights" of the periodical was issued by National Vanguard Books as The Best of ATTACK! and National Vanguard Tabloid in 1984, made up of writings in the publication from 1970 to 1982. Following the terroristic actions of the Order, a neo-Nazi group inspired by The Turner Diaries, the paper mused that, while their actions may have been "ill-advised [...] a new level of action has been set, which will be the baseline for future efforts".

NA member Kevin Alfred Strom edited the magazine beginning in the 1980s. In the early 1990s, the magazine slowed its production rate, and was halted for a time as Pierce shifted their media focus to a radio program, American Dissident Voices. It had reappeared by the 2000s. By 2000, it was still the National Alliance's main periodical, though they later also launched several other periodicals, including the members' bulletin the National Alliance Bulletin, another magazine for wider distribution entitled Free Speech, and the music magazine Resistance. Its main focus in comparison to these other periodicals was more in-depth ideological matters. National Vanguard was brought online as a website in the early 2000s, operated by Strom for the National Alliance.

Following Pierce's death in 2002, there was a leadership dispute in the National Alliance with Pierce's successor, Erich Gliebe, and his leadership style alienating many members. Strom led a schism in 2005, and was with several people ousted. He afterwards founded a group also called the National Vanguard, taking the name from the magazine. Strom also took their website domain, previously used for the magazine, with him, and repurposed it as the website for his National Vanguard organization; he had anticipated the dispute and previously secretly transferred the domain to his wife. He continued to use it to distribute white supremacist materials. The print magazine became defunct. Strom's schism organization ceased in 2007 after he was arrested for possession of child pornography. He was later brought back into the National Alliance by its new leader, Will Williams, in 2014. Strom continues to operate the National Vanguard magazine online under Williams' National Alliance.

== Contents and ideology ==
The paper is largely focused on racist and antisemitic sentiments.

=== As Attack! ===
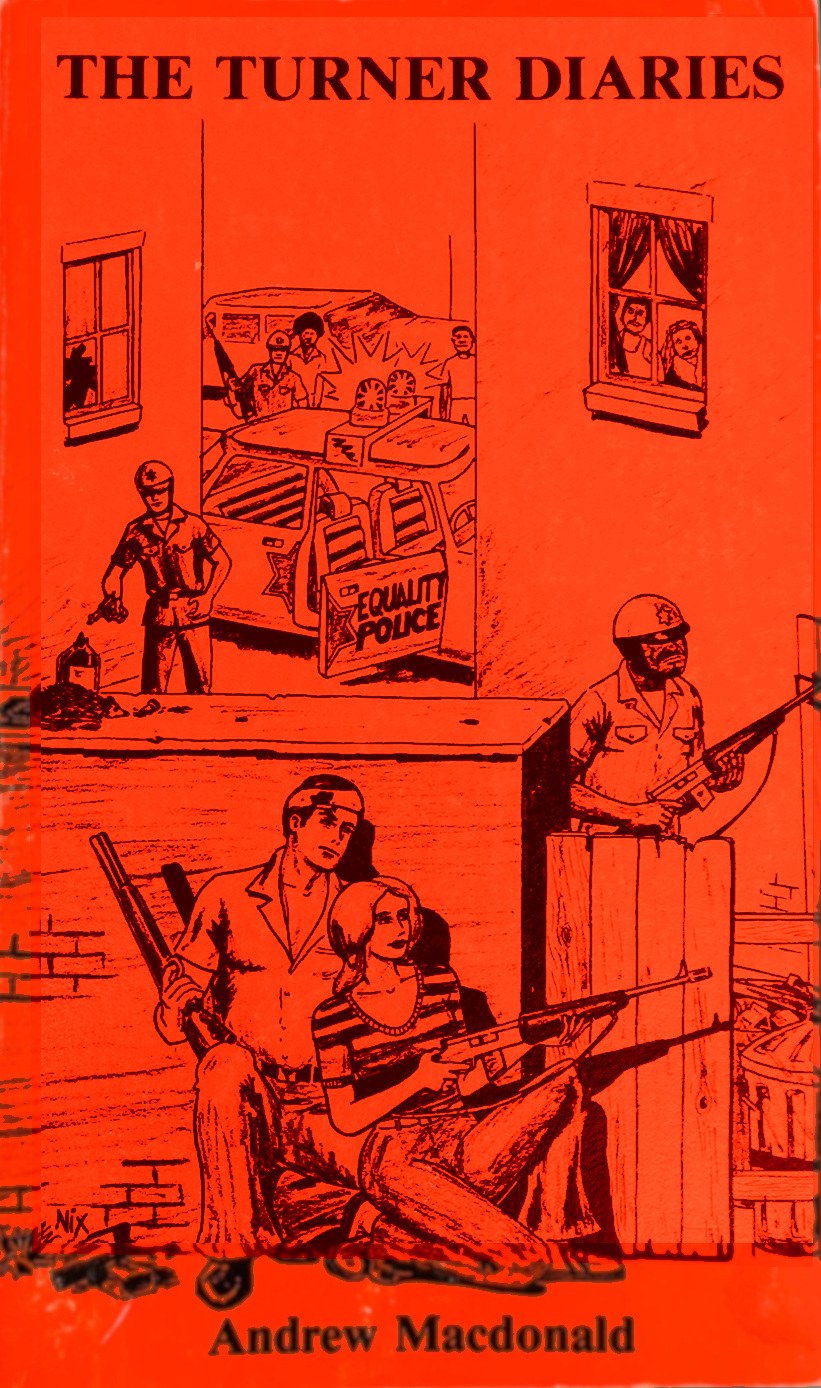
1978 cover of the first paperback edition of The Turner Diaries

Michael Newton described Attack! under the NYA as "focused on the denigration of Jews and nonwhites", while Rob McAlear said it "overflows with anti-Semitism and racism". Jeffrey Kaplan noted it as, at least at the start, "not explicitly National Socialist" in orientation, though later shifted to a more blatant neo-Nazi ideology. Early in its run, it featured articles by individuals like far-right activist Revilo P. Oliver. It also featured articles maligning hippies, as well as graphic photos of crimes committed by the Israeli government, and racist cartoons and journalism. An early issue of Attack! said the paper was:

aimed at just one thing: catching your attention and your interest so we can tell you how much more wonderful life is when you're working for something that really matters—and so we can invite you to work with us

In early issues of Attack!, Pierce used the periodical to call for violence and for tips on committing violence and for arming yourself for war. It had a section entitled "Revolutionary Notes", where he debated the pros and cons of bombings and other attacks; Pierce argued that bombings were like parades and picketing in that they were all "short term tactics". In one issue, Pierce debated the tactical efficacy of bombing movie theaters. It also included firearms recommendations including Pierce's opinions on what weapons were best for "urban warfare". Also included were instructions for bomb-making, the creation of Molotov cocktails, and tips on how to assassinate "anti-White" politicians. In Pierce's propaganda tactics, he was inspired by The Riot Makers: The Technology of Social Demolition, and the author's theory of propaganda pre-conditioning; similar rhetoric is used in these issues of Attack! as is used in The Turner Diaries. The more murderous writing and explicit advocacy of violence largely ceased in 1975. In its place was a more indirect style.

Despite the calls for violence, Pierce suggested to the readers that they do not act in haste and wait until the National Alliance had enough support to see success. In a 1971 editorial, Pierce wrote:

We do not need to reason with the monster; we need to put a bullet into its brain and hammer a stake through its heart. If that means blood and chaos and battling the alien enemy from house to house in burning cities throughout our land – then, by God, it is better that we get on with it now than later.

After dissociating from Carto's NYA, the paper added to its attacks against non-white peoples an anti-conservative bent. In one issue post-Carto, Pierce argued that "Conservatism's belly-crawling fear of the Enemy (real or imagined), its senile retreat into a largely mythical past, its insistence on seances to call back from the dead all that once was—these were some of the symptoms of a species on its way to extinction."

=== As National Vanguard ===
Later issues of National Vanguard moved away from the focus on preparing for violence that Attack! had to focus more on broader racist themes. Articles denounced government policy as biased against whites and claimed black people were inferior. One article complained about the popularity of Holocaust denial on the far-right, writing instead that white supremacists needed to "face the Holocaust squarely" and "judge it on the basis of a higher morality".

Beginning in the 1980s, Pierce also criticized Christianity and promoted his Cosmotheist ideas in the periodical. Other articles included ones titled "Does America Deserve to Live?" and "Jews, the USSR, and Communism". Pierce wrote the editorials, and the periodical wrote on other topics such as their evaluation of survivalists, current events in the far-right sphere, and punk music. Articles have endorsed Kevin Macdonald's antisemitic theories.

== Influence ==
The paper had, at one time, a circulation of about 15,000. The paper was read by the neo-Nazi James Mason, later the author of the influential neo-Nazi book Siege, while he was forming his own ideology. He admired the violent ideology of the paper, and it was recommended by Mason's National Socialist Movement in July 1976, the only periodical they recommended.

When published as a book, The Turner Diaries, first serialized by Pierce in the periodical, became extremely popular among white supremacists, one of the most popular white supremacist works. It has become notorious for inspiring several hate groups and terrorist attacks, including the 1995 Oklahoma City bombing. By 1999, the book had sold over 350,000 copies.
