= Hunter (Pierce novel) =

1989 novel by William Luther Pierce

- Author: William Luther Pierce (as Andrew Macdonald)
- Cover artist: Douglas Grigar
- Language: English
- Genre: Political novel
- Publisher: National Vanguard Books
- Publication date: 1989
- Publication place: United States
- Media type: Print (Paperback)
- Pages: 259
- ISBN: 0-937944-09-2 (paperback)
- OCLC: 44679377
- LC Class: PS3563.A2747
- Preceded by: The Turner Diaries

Hunter is a 1989 novel written by William Luther Pierce, a neo-Nazi and the founder of the National Alliance, a white nationalist group, under the pseudonym Andrew Macdonald. Pierce also used this pseudonym to write the better-known The Turner Diaries, a 1978 novel with similar themes. Some consider Hunter a prequel to The Turner Diaries, detailing the rise of the racist paramilitary group termed "the Organization", which would play a dominant role in the book.

Hunter portrays the actions of Oscar Yeager, a Vietnam veteran and Defense Department consultant who embarks on a plan to assassinate interracial couples and public figures who advocate civil rights in the D.C. area. Yeager's crimes quickly lead to broad national repercussions and draw him into the plans of both a white nationalist group and an ambitious FBI official eager to take advantage of the turmoil he has helped to start.

The book's protagonist is considered by some scholars to be based on racist serial killer Joseph Paul Franklin, who murdered an estimated 22 people over a decade long murder spree. Later editions of the book are dedicated to Franklin, who the book says "did what a responsible son of his race must do". The book received less attention than The Turner Diaries, but was nonetheless influential on the far-right, particularly in the strategy of leaderless resistance, though Pierce denied it was written to promote the strategy. It has been read by, or found in the possession of, several attackers.

== Plot summary ==
The story is set in the United States, presumably during the late 1980s or early 1990s. The protagonist is Oscar Yeager (an anglicization of Jäger, German for hunter), a Vietnam veteran F-4 Phantom pilot and Washington, D.C.-area Defense Department consultant. It begins with Yeager driving around Washington D.C., with a rifle. In his personal campaign of assassination, he initially shoots racially mixed couples in parking lots. Over 22 days, his campaign leads to 12 victims in 6 shootings. In the narrative, Yeager is depicted as the hero. His campaign escalates to more sophisticated methods against higher-profile targets, including prominent journalists and politicians whom Yeager sees as promoting racial mixing. At the same time, Yeager and his girlfriend are developing connections with a white nationalist group, the National League.

After several successful and increasingly ambitious attacks, Yeager is found and confronted by a senior agent of the FBI, William Ryan, who himself is disgusted with Jewish control of the agency and the American social situation. Ryan blackmails Yeager into assisting him with his career by assassinating several Jewish FBI agents and targeting Mossad agents in the United States so that Ryan can be appointed as the head of a newly formed anti-terrorist secret police agency, assume increasing control of the United States, and use his power to challenge and remove Jewish control of the government and media. Yeager is initially not fully antisemitic (in that he does not believe in the "Jewish question"), but his contacts in the National League and Ryan convince him otherwise.

At the same time, the National League achieves growing prominence through the insertion of one of their members into a Christian evangelist television broadcasting ministry, from which he is broadcasting increasingly racist and antisemitic messages. Yeager's campaign of assassination and terrorism, the actions of copycats and imitators, the white nationalist broadcasting effort, the efforts of the anti-terrorist official, and a rapid decline of the US economy all work to push the United States towards increasing racial and social violence and fragmentation.

Eventually, Yeager is faced with a dilemma when Ryan orders him to kill the undercover evangelist minister, whose efforts obstruct the agent's intent to establish order and strike a temporary bargain with the Jews. Yeager attempts to avoid the assignment and then deliberately appears to bungle the assassination. At this point, Yeager is caught between the intentions of Ryan, who intends to consolidate his own power and control over the government so as to reform the system from the top down after suppressing upcoming black nationalist riots, and the National League who wishes to stir up the chaos even further, draw white Americans into battle, and eventually overthrow the government. Ultimately, Yeager kills Ryan.

Following this, the Jewish-controlled media side with the black rioters, revealing that Ryan would have been double-crossed had he attempted to strike his deal. Yeager and the other members of the National League, now under increasing government scrutiny, resolve to go "underground" to continue the fight against the system.

== Background and publication history ==
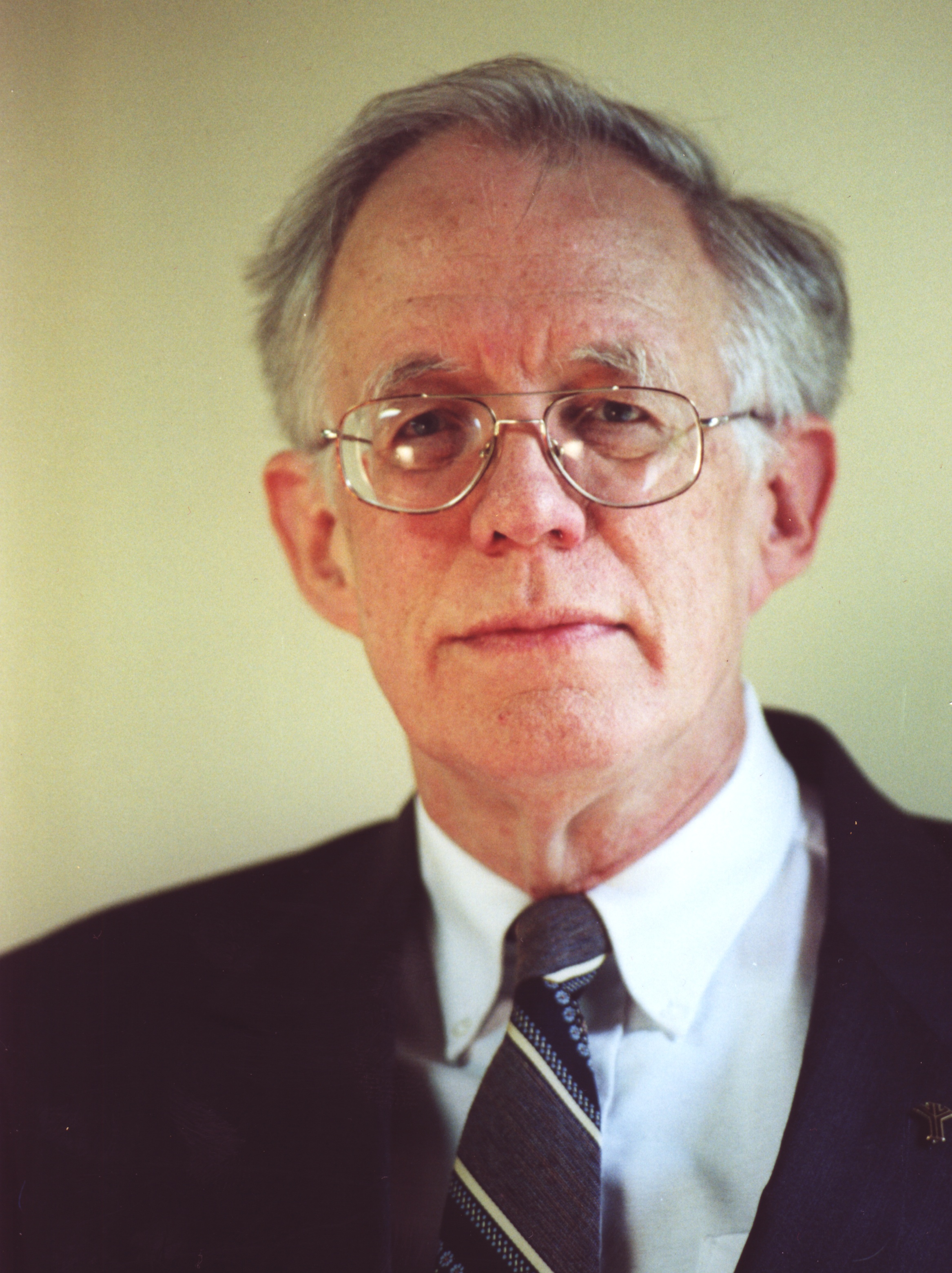
Pierce, pictured 2001

The book was written by William Luther Pierce, the leader and founder of the far-right National Alliance. Pierce had previously written The Turner Diaries. In contrast to The Turner Diaries, Pierce decided to write a "more realistic" novel which "shifted away from the idea of an organized group, to what an exceptional individual can do." He further said that "Hunter serves a real educational process."

He said that the difference between the two books was that he hoped that he had "learned something from the reaction" to the first book, and claimed that his intention in writing it was to advocate his ideology, not promote terrorism. He said that The Turner Diaries "had no character development", and that in Hunter he sought to have the main character change his views as he went on.

The novel was initially published in paperback in 1989, a decade after The Turner Diaries. It was published using the pseudonym Andrew Macdonald, as with The Turner Diaries. The book's reported sales were at 35,000 copies as of 1995. Both it and The Turner Diaries became popular with survivalists and neo-Nazis. The novel has been translated into Russian and Swedish. The Swedish translation was done by Magnus Söderman, a Swedish far-right activist.

First editions of the book are dedicated to Joseph Paul Franklin who, the notice calls, "the Lone Hunter, who saw his duty as a White man and did what a responsible son of his race must do." Subsequent editions have the dedication removed. Franklin was a racist serial killer who murdered an estimated 22 people over a decade long spree; he was executed in 2013. Academic Jeffrey Kaplan noted the first killings of Yeager in the novel to "so closely mirror Franklin’s Seattle killings that there can be no mistaking either the act or the author’s intent", and argued that Yeager as a character is closely modeled on Franklin.

== Analysis ==
The book is somewhat critical of the Christian Identity movement, portraying them as unsophisticated and preoccupied with their religious portrayal of Jews as agents of Satan; however, Pierce portrays them as having some common ground with his ideals, such as in their shared beliefs that Jews control society and that immigration is leading to the destruction of white America. The book's conception of there being an "ultimate truth" is influenced by Pierce's religious concept of Cosmotheism, though there is less clear influence from Cosmotheism than in Turner.

In an interview, Pierce claimed that the book was not meant to advocate leaderless resistance, as some believed, saying he viewed the strategy as nonviable. Michael George said that Pierce had cultivated a following of "young reckless neo-Nazis who put into practice lone-wolf terrorism". Despite his claimed intention, the book contributed to the popularity of the strategy within the far-right, and Pierce has become associated with the strategy.

The Guardian described the novel in its contents as copying Death Wish, a 1972 novel by Brian Garfield.

=== Comparisons with The Turner Diaries ===
According to historian George Michael, the book is "in some ways the sequel to" The Turner Diaries; however, narratively some view it as a prequel, with the National League becoming the "Organization" from The Turner Diaries. Eugene V. Gallagher described it as "a companion piece" to Turner. J.M. Berger writing for the International Centre for Counter-Terrorism said of the work that "the book’s crude style and violent content clearly mirror the approach taken in Turner." Jeffrey Kaplan called the work a "sad sequel" and a "dispirited affair which has garnered little public attention".

Hunter's plot is generally more realistic than the plot of Turner; it focuses on a lone actor instead of a guerilla war. The book's characters ideologically disagree with one another as expressed in their dialogue, more so than in The Turner Diaries. Both protagonists exhibit masculinity in "dominant, violent, and radical" nature, that is considered "in line with the Hitlerian construction of ideal masculinity". However, Pierce neither believes nor depicts all white men as fitting the archetypes, instead viewing a difference between "man and higher man", although he influences readers to become the latter. In contrast to the ending of The Turner Diaries, the ending of the book is not necessarily triumphant, but both books have an apocalyptic ending.

Jeffrey Kaplan described both books as being perfect examples of a type of post-apocalyptic literature where the narrative sees no other option other than the apocalypse, "and therefore embraces the inevitable cataclysm in the faith that the millennial future will bring at long last, perfect peace and terrestrial perfection".

== Terrorism ==
As with The Turner Diaries, the book has been found in the possessions or to have been read by many individuals known to have committed hate-motivated violent acts. Among them:

- Conspirators in the Oklahoma City bombing (1995) were found to have Hunter in their possession, in addition to Serpent's Walk, another book published by National Vanguard Books, previously thought by some to have also been written by Pierce
- Larry Wayne Shoemake (1996), committed a mass shooting against black people in Mississippi, read both The Turner Diaries and Hunter
- Peter Mangs (2009–2010), a serial killer targeting immigrants in Sweden, had read both The Turner Diaries and Hunter. He was fixated on Joseph Paul Franklin, who the book is devoted to. He was introduced to Franklin by the book
- Pavlo Lapshyn (2013), Ukrainian murderer, an audiobook of The Turner Diaries and a Russian translation of Hunter were found in his possession
- Zack Davies (2015), A British neo-Nazi who tried to behead a Sikh man (thinking him to be a Muslim); both The Turner Diaries and Hunter were found in his home
