= Senator Carey =

Senator Carey may refer to:

== Members of the United States Senate ==
- Joseph M. Carey (1845–1924), U.S. Senator from Wyoming from 1890 to 1895
- Robert D. Carey (1878–1937), U.S. Senator from Wyoming from 1930 to 1937

== United States state senate members ==
- John Carey (Ohio state legislator) (born 1959), Ohio State Senate
- John Carey (Wisconsin politician) (1839–1888), Wisconsin State Senate
- Philip J. Carey (1918–1996), Illinois State Senate
- Richard Carey (politician) (1929–2013), Maine State Senate

== See also ==
- Senator Cary (disambiguation)
- List of people with surname Carey
- John Kerry (born 1943), U.S. Senator from Massachusetts from 1985 to 2013
