= George Wallace 1968 presidential campaign =

American political campaign

George Wallace for President 1968
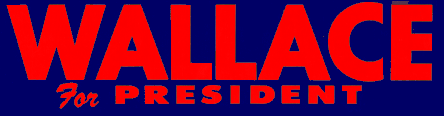
- Campaign: 1968 United States presidential election
- Candidate: George Wallace; Governor of Alabama (1963–1967, 1971–1979, 1983–1987); First Gentleman of Alabama (1967–1968); Gen. Curtis LeMay; Chief of Staff of the U.S. Air Force (1961–1965)
- Affiliation: American Independent Party
- Status: Announced: February 8, 1968; Lost election: November 5, 1968
- Headquarters: Montgomery, Alabama
- Slogan(s): Stand Up for America; Send them a Message

Former Governor of Alabama George Wallace ran in the 1968 United States presidential election as the candidate for the American Independent Party against Richard Nixon and Hubert Humphrey. Wallace's pro-segregation policies during his term as Governor of Alabama were rejected by most Americans. The impact of the Wallace campaign was substantial, winning the electoral votes of several states in the Deep South. Although Wallace did not expect to win the election, his strategy was to prevent either major party candidate from winning a majority in the Electoral College. This would throw the election into the House of Representatives, where Wallace would have bargaining power sufficient to determine, or at least strongly influence, the selection of a winner.

Although Nixon ultimately won a majority of 301 electoral votes (270 being a majority), Wallace's effort put the chance of a brokered electoral college relatively close. For example, had Wallace won South Carolina or Tennessee (falling less than 50,000 votes short) and had the Democratic ticket won either Illinois or Ohio (trailing the Republican one by around 100,000 votes in both cases) Nixon would have ended up with a plurality but not a majority, and the election would have been – for the first time since 1824 – brought before to the House of Representatives.

== Campaign development ==
When George Wallace ran for President in 1968, it was not as a Democrat – which he had done in the 1964 Democratic primaries and would again in the 1972 Democratic primaries – but as a candidate of the American Independent Party. The American Independent Party was formed by Wallace, whose pro-segregation policies as governor had been rejected by the mainstream of the Democratic Party. In 1968 he ran on the idea that "there's not a dime's worth of difference between the two major parties". Wallace's strategy was essentially the same as that of Dixiecrat candidate Strom Thurmond in 1948 in that the campaign was run without any realistic chance of winning the election outright, but instead with the hope of receiving enough electoral votes to force the House of Representatives and the Senate decide the election, something many observers thought might happen. This would presumably give him the role of a power broker; Wallace hoped that southern states could use their influence to end federal efforts toward desegregation.

Wallace ran a campaign supporting law and order and states' rights on racial segregation. This strongly appealed to rural white Southerners and blue-collar union workers in the North. Wallace was leading the three-way race in the Old Confederacy with 45% of the vote in mid-September. Wallace's appeal to blue-collar workers and union members (who usually voted Democratic) hurt Hubert Humphrey in Northern states like Ohio, Illinois, New Jersey, Michigan, and Wisconsin. A mid-September AFL–CIO internal poll showed that one in three union members supported Wallace, and a Chicago Sun-Times poll showed that Wallace had a plurality of 44% of white steelworkers in Chicago.

However, both Humphrey and Richard Nixon were able to peel back some Wallace support by November; the unions highlighted the flow of Northern union jobs to Wallace's Alabama, a right-to-work state (although Wallace publicly opposed right-to-work laws), and Nixon persuaded enough Southerners that a "divided vote" would give the election to Humphrey. From October 13–20, Wallace's support fell from 20% to 15% nationally. In the North, the former Wallace vote split evenly between Humphrey and Nixon. In the border South, Wallace defectors were choosing Nixon over Humphrey by three to one. In the South, Nixon had the support of Wallace defectors over Humphrey, four to one.

Wallace's foreign policy positions set him apart from the other candidates in the field. "If the Vietnam War was not winnable within 90 days of his taking office, Wallace pledged an immediate withdrawal of U.S. troops ... Wallace also called foreign-aid money 'poured down a rat hole' and demanded that European and Asian allies pay more for their defense." These stances were overshadowed by Wallace's running mate, retired Air Force general Curtis LeMay, who implied he would use nuclear weapons to win the war.

The executive director of Wallace's 1968 campaign, Tom Turnipseed, a Mobile native, was later a member of the South Carolina State Senate and an attorney in Columbia, South Carolina. Not long after the 1968 campaign, Turnipseed began moving to the political left, joined the Americans for Democratic Action, and became active in the civil rights and environmental movements.

== Vice presidential selection ==
Former Georgia governor Marvin Griffin was a temporary running mate in order to get the Wallace candidacy on the ballot in several states. The Wallace campaign considered former Secretary of Agriculture Ezra Taft Benson, KFC founder Harland Sanders, retired Air Force General Curtis LeMay, and FBI Director J. Edgar Hoover as possible running mates. Benson and LeMay expressed interest, and Hoover did not even respond. In June, the campaign looked into several members of Congress, all of whom were unwilling to attach themselves to the Wallace ticket. Wallace's aides came to favor Happy Chandler, the former baseball commissioner and governor of Kentucky. It was hoped that Chandler could help put Wallace over the top in Tennessee, South Carolina, and Florida, where he was narrowly behind Nixon, and solidify support in Arkansas, Georgia, and North Carolina, where Wallace was leading. Wallace was cautious: Chandler had supported the hiring of Jackie Robinson by the Brooklyn Dodgers, and was now more of a mainstream liberal Democratic politician. Wallace was persuaded by early September; as one of Wallace's aides put it, "We have all the nuts in the country, we could get some decent people– you working one side of the street and he working the other side." When the "done deal" was leaked to the press, Wallace's supporters objected; Wallace's Kentucky campaign chair resigned, and influential donor Nelson Bunker Hunt demanded that Chandler be dropped from the ticket. Wallace retracted the invitation. Hunt's first choice for the second slot was Benson. Benson was barred by several leaders of the Church of Jesus Christ of Latter-day Saints from joining a Wallace ticket; Benson's membership in the Quorum of the Twelve Apostles would have caused an image problem for the church had he joined the Wallace ticket.

Wallace ended up persuading Curtis LeMay, who feared being labeled a racist, to join the campaign. LeMay was chairman of the board of an electronics company, and the company would dismiss him if he spent his time running for vice president; Hunt set up a million-dollar fund to reimburse him for any losses.

Curtis LeMay was an enthusiast for the use of nuclear weapons. Wallace's aides tried to persuade him to avoid questions relating to the topic, but when asked about it at his first interview, he attempted to dispel American "phobias about nuclear weapons" and discussed radioactive landcrabs at Bikini Atoll. LeMay again embarrassed Wallace's campaign in the fall by suggesting that nuclear weapons could be used in the Vietnam War, which led Humphrey to dub Wallace and LeMay the "Bombsey Twins". The selection of LeMay proved a disastrous drag on the campaign and was dubbed the "LeMay fiasco" internally. The selection reinforced Wallace's gender gap: in late September, Wallace's support stood at 50% in the Old Confederacy among men, and 40% among women. In the North, Wallace had 20% support among men, but less than half that among women.

== Campaign rhetoric ==
Locations in the United States where George Wallace held campaign rallies (post-September 1st, 1968)

Most mainstream media editorials expressed opposition to the Wallace campaign, but some southern newspapers enthusiastically backed him. George W. Shannon of the Shreveport Journal, for instance, wrote countless editorials supporting the third-party concept in presidential elections. Wallace repaid Shannon by appearing at Shannon's retirement dinner. In addition to Shannon, Pete Hamill of the New Left magazine Ramparts wrote that "Wallace and the black and radical militants ... share some common ground: local control of schools and institutions, a desire to radically change America, a violent distrust of the power structure and the establishment. In this year's election, the only one of the three major candidates who is a true radical is Wallace." New Leftist Jack Newfield, who by 1971 had become critical of both his movement and "consensus liberals" like Humphrey, wrote that year:

I cannot recall either Johnson in 1964 or Humphrey in 1968 campaigning on any positive or exciting ideas that might excite the almost-poor workers, whose votes they took for granted ... In contrast, George Wallace has been sounding like William Jennings Bryan as he attacked concentrated wealth in his speeches ...

From 1960 to 1968 liberal Democrats governed the country. But nothing basic got done to make life decisively better for the white workingman. When he bitched about street crime, he was called a Goldwaterite by liberals who felt secure in the suburbs behind high fences and expensive locks. When he complained about his daughter being bused, he was called a racist by liberals who could afford to send their own children to private schools. Meanwhile, the liberal elite repeated their little Polish jokes at Yale and on the Vineyard; and they cheered when Eugene McCarthy reminded them that the educated people voted for him and the uneducated people voted for Robert Kennedy.

Liberal hypocrisy created a lot of Wallace votes in 1968.

On October 24, 1968, Wallace spoke at Madison Square Garden before "the largest political rally held in New York City since Franklin Roosevelt had denounced the forces of 'organized money' from the same stage in 1936". An overflow crowd of 20,000 packed the Garden while pro- and anti-Wallace protesters clashed with more than 1,000 police across the street. In a now-famous reference to a protester who had lain down in front of Lyndon B. Johnson's limousine the year before, Wallace stated, "I tell you when November comes, the first time they lie down in front of my limousine it'll be the last one they ever lay down in front of; their day is over!

Richard Strout, the influential columnist for the New Republic, sat in an upper balcony. For more than forty years, he had reported on the American political scene, under the by-line "T.R.B. from Washington," but nothing had prepared him for the spectacle he encountered at the Garden that night. "There is menace in the blood shout of the crowds," he wrote his readers. "You feel you have known this somewhere; never again will you read about Berlin in the 30s without remembering this wild confrontation here of two irrational forces." The American "sickness" had been localized in the person of George Wallace, the "ablest demagogue of our time, with a voice of venom and a gut knowledge of the prejudices of the low-income class." He would not win, said Strout, and his strength was declining, "but sympathy for him is another matter.

When asked what he considered the "biggest domestic issue for 1968," Wallace replied:

It's people—our fine American people, living their own lives, buying their own homes, educating their children, running their own farms, working the way they like to work, and not having the bureaucrats and intellectual morons trying to manage everything for them. It's a matter of trusting the people to make their own decisions.

On the campaign trail, Wallace often repeated this theme, saying:

What are the Real issues that exist today in these United States? It is the trend of the pseudo-intellectual government, where a select, elite group have written guidelines in bureaus and court decisions, have spoken from some pulpits, some college campuses, some newspaper offices, looking down their noses at the average man on the street.

== General election results ==
Red states went to Nixon, blue to Humphrey, orange to Wallace.

Wallace's "outsider" status was once again popular with voters, particularly in the rural South. He won 9,901,118 popular votes (out of a total of 73,199,998), that is, 13.5% of votes cast nationally; carried five Southern states—Alabama, Arkansas, Georgia, Louisiana, and Mississippi; and won 45 electoral votes plus one vote from a faithless elector, and came fairly close to receiving enough votes to throw the election to the House of Representatives. He was the first such person since Harry F. Byrd, an independent segregationist candidate in the 1960 presidential election. (John Hospers in 1972, Ronald Reagan in 1976, Lloyd Bentsen in 1988, John Edwards in 2004 and many non-candidates in 2016 all received one electoral vote from dissenters, but none earned those votes via the popular vote, and none except Hospers were actively running for president in the general election for those respective years.) Wallace also received the vote of one North Carolina elector who was pledged to Nixon.

Wallace's percentage vote of 13.53% is considerably less than the 19% won by Ross Perot in 1992 who unlike Wallace did not win any electoral votes.

Wallace was the most popular 1968 presidential candidate among young men. Wallace also proved to be popular among blue-collar workers in the North and Midwest, and he took many votes which might have otherwise gone to Humphrey.

Wallace's support in the North plummeted from 13% in early October to 8% by election day. Nixon won the Carolinas and Tennessee with less than 40% of the vote, with Wallace close behind. These were worth 32 electoral votes (though Wallace had received 1 electoral vote from North Carolina). Had Wallace won these states, Nixon would have won the election with 270 votes, the bare minimum. However, it is highly likely that a stronger Wallace performance would have handed Missouri, the closest state (a margin of 0.57%) and a border state, to Humphrey, which would have thrown the election to the House (which as explained earlier, was Wallace's intention all along). A change of around 1% in either Ohio or New Jersey would have also thrown the election to the House, had Wallace carried North Carolina or Tennessee. A Wallace win in either one of the Carolinas or Tennessee and a 1.14% shift in Ohio would be the simplest way for the election to be thrown to the House.

For Wallace to have denied Nixon the electoral vote majority himself, the closest way possible would be another 48,000 votes in Tennessee, 39,000 votes in South Carolina, 132,000 votes in North Carolina and 211,000 votes in Florida, a total of 430,000 votes which would have brought Nixon down to 256 electoral votes and Wallace up to 91 electoral votes. These states were all the ones that Wallace had come in second bypassing the need to get ahead of Humphrey.

== 1968 U.S. House election ==
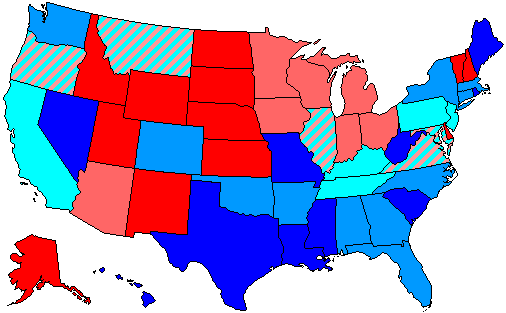
Republicans controlled the congressional delegations of the red states, Democrats controlled those of the states in blue

Under the United States Constitution, the House of Representatives elects the President in the event no candidate receives a majority in the Electoral College. Each state's House delegation receives one vote. The map on the right indicates the majority party of each state's delegation following the 1968 United States House of Representatives elections – blue states being Democratic and red states being Republican. This House would have elected the President had Wallace succeeded in denying his opponents an Electoral College majority.

As indicated on the map, Democrats controlled 26 of the 50 state house delegations, with Republicans controlling 19 delegations and the other five being evenly split. Had the Democratic delegations all been firmly behind Humphrey, then Wallace might have found himself with little influence on post-election events even if he had succeeded in forcing the election into the House. However, Wallace believed the Southern Democratic delegations would not support Humphrey without first obtaining substantial concessions with respect to federal desegregation measures, or might even have agreed to back Nixon if he agreed to Southern demands.

An alternative theory holds that had Wallace achieved his aim he could have pre-empted an election in the House by instructing his own electors to back one of the major party candidates – there was no legal or constitutional impediment that would have prevented him from doing so. This would have allowed Wallace the opportunity to negotiate directly with the major candidates (provided he could have concluded such negotiations prior to the Electoral College formally casting its votes for president). It has been postulated that Wallace might possibly have been able to come to an agreement with Nixon who (with his party controlling only 19 state delegations) might have been seen to have little prospect of being elected president without making some sort of arrangement with Wallace.

=== Endorsements ===
List of George Wallace endorsements

Wallace had received endorsements from: U.S. Representatives
:Current

- Representative George Andrews (D-AL)
- Representative Tom Bevill (D-AL)
- Representative Bob Jones (D-AL)
- Representative Bill Nichols (D-AL)
- Representative Armistead Selden Jr. (D-AL)
- Representative John Rarick (D-LA)

:Former
Governors
:Current

- Governor of Alabama Albert Brewer (D-AL)
- Governor of Georgia Lester Maddox (D-GA)
- Governor of Mississippi John Bell Williams (D-MS)

:Former

- Governor of Alabama John Patterson (D-AL)
- Governor of Arkansas Orval Faubus (D-AR)
- Governor of Georgia Marvin Griffin (D-GA)
- Governor of Mississippi Ross Barnett (D-MS)

Military

- Former Major General Edwin Walker (D-TX)
- Former Colonel Laurence Bunker
- Director of the Selective Service System Lewis Blaine Hershey

State, Territory, and Local Officials

- Attorney General of Alabama MacDonald Gallion (D-AL)
- Secretary of State of Alabama Mabel Amos (D-AL)
- State Treasurer of Alabama Agnes Baggett (D-AL)
- Commissioner of Agriculture of Alabama Richard Beard (D-AL)
- Former Associate Justice of the Arkansas Supreme Court "Justice Jim" Johnson (D-AR)
- Former Lieutenant Governor of Alabama James Allen (D-AL)
- Former Lieutenant Governor of Georgia Peter Zack Geer (D-GA)
- Associate Justice of the Mississippi Supreme Court Thomas Pickens Brady (D-MS)

Actors

- Walter Brennan
- Chill Wills

Musicians

- Dave Gardner

Writers

- Dan Smoot (R-TX)

Notable Family Members of Political Figures

- Mary Jane Selden, Wife of Congressmen Armistead Selden Jr. (D-AL)
- Maryon Pittman Allen, Wife of Former Lt. Governor of Alabama James Allen (D-AL)

Other Notable Individuals

- Maurice Bessinger, Chairman of the South Carolina Independent Party (I-SC)
- Ben Klassen, founder of the Creativity Movement
- William Shearer, Chairman of the American Independent Party of California (AIP-CA)
- Tom Turnipseed, President of the Wallace Forum Association (D-SC)
- Bull Connor, President of the Alabama Public Service Commission (D-AL)
- William J. Simmons, National Administrator of the White Citizens' Councils (D-MS)
- Robert Shelton, Grand Wizard of the United Klans of America (D-AL)
- Leander Perez, Democratic political boss of Plaquemines and St. Bernard Parishes (D-LA)
- William Luther Pierce, author of The Turner Diaries and member of the National Alliance
- Willis Carto, American far-right political activist, (Note: In 1968, Carto established Youth for Wallace (also Youth for George Wallace) as a youth group to support segregationist governor George Wallace's bid for president as American Independent Party candidate in 1968. The National Youth Alliance was reorganized from Youth for Wallace in 1969 when Wallace lost., The National Youth Alliance would later become the National Alliance)
- Tom Metzger, American far-right political activist

Groups

- White Citizens' Councils (Note: It has been noted that members of such groups had permeated the Wallace campaign by 1968 and, while Wallace did not openly seek their support, nor did he refuse it)
- Liberty Lobby (Note: distributing a pro-Wallace pamphlet entitled "Stand up for America" despite the campaign's denial of such a connection.)
- Constitution Party (Note: In 1967, the Louisiana and Florida affiliates held rallies and petition drives in support of Wallace if he were to run for president) (Note: During the 1968 presidential election the party supported the American Independent Party's candidates Governor George Wallace and General Curtis LeMay, but in North Dakota Richard K. Troxell and Merle Thayer were given the presidential and vice presidential nominations and received 34 votes.)

== Bibliography ==
- Carlson, Jody (1981). George C. Wallace and the Politics of Powerlessness: The Wallace Campaigns for the Presidency, 1964-1976. New Brunswick: Transaction Books. ISBN 0-87855-344-4.
- Carter, Dan T. (1995). The Politics of Rage: George Wallace, the Origins of the New Conservatism, and the Transformation of American Politics. New York: Simon & Schuster. ISBN 0-8071-2597-0.
- Lesher, Stephan (1994). George Wallace: American Populist. Reading, Mass.: Addison-Wesley. ISBN 0-201-62210-6.
- Rohler, L. E. (2004). George Wallace: Conservative populist. Great American orators, no. 32. Westport, Conn.: Praeger. ISBN 0-313-31119-6.
