= Senator Cary =

Senator Cary may refer to:

- Archibald Cary (1721–1787), Virginia State Senate
- John W. Cary (1817–1895), Wisconsin State Senate
- Luther H. Cary (1824–1888), Wisconsin State Senate
- Shepard Cary (1805–1866), Maine State Senate
- Trumbull Cary (1787–1869), New York State Senate

== See also ==
- Senator Carey (disambiguation)
