= William White Williams =

American white nationalist (born 1947)

- Born: William White Williams II; 1947 (age 78–79); North Carolina, US
- Other name: White Will
- Organization(s): Church of the Creator, National Alliance

William White Williams II (born 1947) is an American white nationalist who is the fourth and current chairman of the white supremacist group the National Alliance. In the late 1980s, he was the second in command, or hasta primus, of Ben Klassen's Church of the Creator (COTC) and was the editor of the COTC's paper, Racial Loyalty.

Williams joined the United States Army Special Forces and served two combat tours in the Vietnam War. After leaving the army, he became a tax resister and then a white supremacist in the 1980s after a feud with the IRS. He first joined Frazier Glenn Miller Jr.'s White Patriot Party in 1985, moving on through several far-right groups before joining the COTC in 1988; he left a year later. Williams joined William Luther Pierce's National Alliance (NA) in 1992 and was their membership coordinator from then until 1995, but he left the NA in 2002 due to the prevalence of skinheads.

Williams has described himself as a "biological racist" and "racial loyalist", and as against interracial marriage. He ran as a delegate for Ron Paul at the Republican National Convention in 2008. The Paul campaign disavowed him once his views were publicized. In 2014, Williams obtained control of the National Alliance from Pierce's successor, Erich Gliebe, and became its chairman. He has been controversial among other white supremacists, often due to his association with Kevin Alfred Strom. In 2015 he was arrested and later convicted of battery for assaulting an NA employee at their compound.

== Early life and military service ==
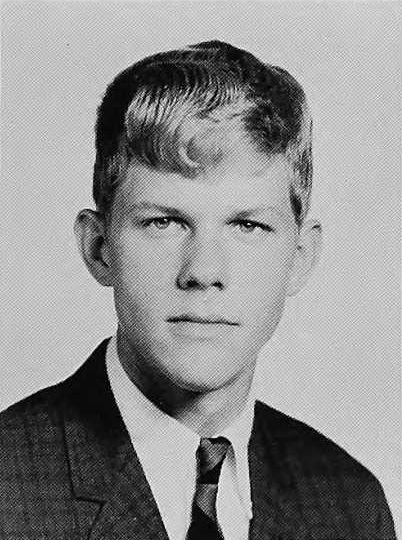
Williams' senior yearbook photo, 1965

William White Williams II was born in 1947 in North Carolina. He grew up in an affluent family. After graduating high school in 1966, Williams joined the United States Army Special Forces as an officer and served two combat tours in the Vietnam War. He stated of his motive for joining the army that it was an "adventure" and that he "wanted to kill communists".

Williams became a captain in the army aged 22. He later credited his experience in the army and in Vietnam with making him racist; he also said that he developed post-traumatic stress disorder from his experiences. He left the army by age 23 and enrolled in college but dropped out after a year. He began to work in construction and architecture. He has been married three times and divorced twice.

== White supremacy ==
Radicalized by a three-year battle with a black IRS auditor in the early 1980s, Williams became a tax resister and then a white supremacist. He stopped paying taxes, dropped out of his work, and instead worked as an artist. Williams first joined Frazier Glenn Miller Jr.'s White Patriot Party in North Carolina in 1985; the two men became friends, and Williams was involved in many of their marches. He participated in a 1986 march with them in Raleigh to protest Martin Luther King Jr. Day. He then went on to be a member of several far-right groups, including the Southern National Front and then the National Democratic Front.

Williams, a white nationalist, has described himself as a "biological racist", and described himself in 2008 as "ethnocentric", "pro-white", and against interracial marriage. He has said that "Hitler was the greatest Communist fighter in history", though claimed he does not "worship Hitler". Williams was previously a poster on the white supremacist website Stormfront, though he was at one point banned. He dislikes Christianity for its connections with Judaism; he has criticized the white supremacist Christian Identity belief system (which says white people are the true chosen people, not Jews) as "not grounded in reality" and "craziness".

=== Involvement with the Church of the Creator (1988–1989) ===
Williams was for a time a member of the white supremacist religious leader Ben Klassen's Church of the Creator (COTC). He joined after reading Klassen's book, Building a Whiter and Brighter World. He was the second in command of the COTC, "hasta primus", from January 1988 to June 1989. Jeffrey Kaplan described him as one of only a few "capable administrators" the COTC had. He brought his girlfriend along; Klassen required them to marry if he wanted to live with her. Williams married her on August 8, 1988, at 8 minutes after 8 p.m. at the COTC camp, a reference to 88 for Heil Hitler. Klassen also greatly disliked the fact that Williams brought his dog into the COTC camp. Williams's help increased the group's profile. He edited their monthly paper, Racial Loyalty, with his wife working as the typesetter; they lived at the COTC's commune. He was also a cartoonist.

Wiliams was, for a time, a neighbor and friend of fellow North Carolinian neo-Nazi Harold Covington; they collaborated in an effort to broadcast Tom Metzger's white supremacist public-access show Race and Reason. However, Covington had a lengthy feud with the COTC, which extended into a feud with Williams; Covington accused Williams of only being out for Klassen's money. Racial Loyalty issued harsh criticisms against Covington, and Covington sued the COTC, Klassen, and Williams for libel, though Covington later dropped the case. Williams and Klassen then got Covington fired from his job. Covington claimed that Williams disguised himself as an FBI agent and contacted his employer, saying the Jewish Defense League had a plot to assassinate Covington. According to the local newspaper The News & Observer, Covington afterwards became his "longtime rival".

Williams left the COTC about a year after he joined, in 1989. Both Williams and his life left the COTC separately; he and his wife later divorced. In Klassen's final book, published shortly before he killed himself in 1993, he devoted a critical chapter to his experiences with Williams and his wife; in it, Klassen accused Williams of abusing his wife and said Williams's experience in Vietnam had obviously left "deep psychological scars". Williams says Klassen's claims about him are inaccurate, that at the time Klassen had "lost it", and that Klassen was trying to discredit him for converting people in the COTC to other white supremacist groups.

=== Member of National Alliance (1992–2002) ===
Williams left and moved to West Virginia in early 1992 to join William Luther Pierce's white supremacist group the National Alliance (NA). In the NA, Williams was their first membership coordinator from 1992 to early 1995. As of 1997, he was their regional coordinator and leader of their branch in North Carolina, and was a key member of the movement. Under Pierce's leadership, the NA was one of America's most significant white supremacist groups. Williams lived on their commune in West Virginia in the 1990s. In the 1990s, Williams helped write and illustrate a National Alliance comic book, The Saga of White Will, that focused on a character named "White Will", modeled after him. Afterwards, other white supremacists commonly referred to him by that name.

In 1994, Williams was made to leave a gun show at the Dixie Gun and Knife Classic at the North Carolina State Fair where he had rented a table, due to his passing out National Alliance literature. In April 1996, Williams and other National Alliance members were kicked out of another gun show due to their literature being seen as offensive. In 1996, Williams sued the North Carolina Department of Agriculture and Consumer Services and one other individual due to the 1994 incident, suing for $200 in direct compensation and $50,000 for emotional damages, alleging it violated his First Amendment rights and inflicted emotional distress. The suit was dismissed by a judge in February 1997, who declared that Williams had not established the distress had been caused to him intentionally.

Continuing their previous dispute, in 1997, Williams sued Harold Covington for libel in Wake County, North Carolina, based on defamatory statements Covington had made about him online and in his newsletter. Among the statements at issue were Covington's accusations of Williams of being a thief, of recruiting a future murderer into the white supremacist movement, and of being the second John Doe in the 1995 Oklahoma City bombing. Covington admitted to making the statements but called the lawsuit a "waste of time", considering Williams to be "libel-proof" due to his involvement in white supremacy. Williams won the suit, and Covington was ordered to pay him $10,000. In what several commentators described as an effort to avoid paying Williams, Covington moved states to Washington.

In 2000, Williams spoke at an anti-immigration rally in Siler City, North Carolina, alongside David Duke. At the same time, Williams was active in the North Carolina branch of Pat Buchanan's Reform Party, and expressed interest in turning it into a "party of the white". Two years later, Williams quit the National Alliance, disliking the direction it was taking and the prevalence of skinheads. At other times he said the reason he left involved a dispute with fellow white nationalist April Gaede. Soon after, Pierce died. Pierce was followed up as leader by Erich Gliebe; his leadership was widely regarded as poor, and Williams criticized him.

=== Ron Paul campaign involvement ===
After leaving the National Alliance, Williams moved to Tennessee. He attempted to remove Gliebe from power in the National Alliance in 2007, but this fell through at the time. Williams supported Ron Paul's presidential run in 2008; he was banned from an online community of Ron Paul supporters due to his racial views. In 2008, he ran to represent presidential candidate Ron Paul at the 2008 Republican National Convention as a delegate; he was approved by Paul and was on the slate of candidates. He earned nearly 12,000 votes, 14th among Paul delegates.

When Williams's white supremacist history and connection to the Paul campaign was publicized, the Paul campaign dissociated themself from Williams and said they were unaware of his views; the Paul campaign afterwards said they wanted nothing to do with Williams. Williams said he had no regrets. In 2012, he once again ran unsuccessfully as a delegate for the Republican Party.

=== As leader of the National Alliance (2014–) ===
The National Alliance floundered for years under Gliebe's leadership, while Williams planned to take power. In 2013, Gliebe entirely ended the National Alliance's existence as a membership organization for unclear reasons. The same year, Williams met up with former NA member Kevin Alfred Strom; while Gliebe still led the original National Alliance, Strom and Williams attempted to build a new one. They restarted the NA's radio show American Dissident Voices, which Gliebe had ceased. At the same time, other members of the National Alliance, led by Jim Ring and Pierce's brother Sandy Pierce, formed the National Alliance Reform and Restoration Group (NARRG); while they also disliked Gliebe, they criticized Williams, mostly due to his friendship with Strom. Strom had previously plead guilty and was convicted for possession of child pornography. Williams has claimed that Strom was not guilty and had been "framed". In December 2014, Williams was not allowed at a white supremacist summit due to his promotion of Strom.

In March 2014, Gliebe, alongside two other top members of the NA, was sued by NARRG, in an effort to remove him from the leadership; the lawsuit accused him of mismanaging the organization, of bribing other NA members, and of using it as his personal fund source. At the same time, Williams, offended by Gliebe attempting to sell Pierce's personal library, began secretly negotiating with Gliebe to buy its assets. Facing the suit, Gliebe eventually offered to give him the National Alliance. He was secretly added to its board of directors, and on October 23, a secret vote declaring Williams chairman was held. Gliebe then resigned from his position as chairman and announced he had given leadership over to Williams, shocking other members of the group. Gliebe said he gave it to Williams because Williams was the most knowledgeable and was "not a cultist". NARCG criticized the decision; they called Williams a "racial gadfly" and accused him of opportunism. They also criticized him for his involvement with Strom.

With Strom, Williams brought back the National Alliance, though by late 2015 Southern Poverty Law Center (SPLC) said that he "has effectively accelerated the group’s decline at a pace even faster than the dozen or so years of Erich Gliebe's tenure". As leader, he brought back Strom as their communications director. This was controversial and unpopular among other National Alliance members due to Strom's previous conviction. In 2014, his close friend Frazier Glenn Miller committed two shootings targeting Jewish groups, killing 3; Williams called it a "terrible act", but said that "he’s just a flesh-and-bones man"; he called Miller repeatedly from prison and told him to "know that people were thinking about him and to keep his head up". He arranged for Miller to do an interview with the The Kansas City Star where he admitted to the crime.

Under Williams, the National Alliance recentered around Pierce's racist religious philosophy, Cosmotheism. Williams claimed Gliebe left them with immense amounts of debt. By 2015, Williams had managed to rebuild the group somewhat, to about 100 dues-paying members. His wife, Svetlana, a Russian woman 24 years his junior, became the NA's business manager. He secretly hired an accountant, Ralph Dilloway, to do a financial audit; Dilloway found many instances of financial impropriety. Dilloway claimed Williams ignored his concerns. After an altercation with Williams at the headquarters on May 3, 2015, Dilloway fled and attempted to seek protection as a whistleblower, giving many of his documents over to the SPLC. Williams said the financial issues had been committed under Gliebe and said that Dilloway had stolen their financial records. Williams denied that he hired Dilloway to do this, and claimed the financial issues identified by Dilloway were the fault of the previous NA leaders. At the same time, Williams was accused of intimidating other NA members, and the West Virginia commune was described by the SPLC as "basically uninhabitable"; many in the white supremacist movement became more critical of Williams at this time.

On December 16, 2015, Williams was arrested and charged with battery while at the National Alliance's West Virginia commune for allegedly attempting to strangle a clerk of the National Alliance in September. Williams was then banned from the National Alliance headquarters; Strom became de facto leader for a time. He was then arrested again later in the week for violating a protection order about contacting another National Alliance employee. He was convicted of misdemeanor battery in August 2018.

By 2020, Williams had re-assumed control of the group; he told Pierce's son, Kelvin Pierce, that "Everybody thought we were down and out. But we're back. … We are definitely back". The same year, speaking to ABC News, Williams claimed that the NA no longer advocates for a whites-only United States and that they reject violence, but that they are "racial separatists" who want "peaceful separation". Under Williams' leadership, the group relocated to Tennessee.

== Bibliography ==
- Pierce, William Luther (1993). The Saga of... White Will!!. Hillsboro: National Vanguard Books. Williams did the coloring.
- Williams, William White (2021). Pocahontes Show Trial: The Wrongful Conviction of an "Unpopular Figure" in West Virginia. Mountain City: Cosmotheist Books. ISBN 978-1-73364-816-5.
