= Mill Point, West Virginia =

- Unincorporated community
- Location within West Virginia Location within the United States
- Coordinates: 38°09′29″N 80°10′51″W
- Country: United States
- State: West Virginia
- County: Pocahontas
- Elevation: 2,198 ft (670 m)
- Time zone: UTC-5 (Eastern (EST))
  - Summer (DST): UTC-4 (EDT)
- Area codes: 304 & 681
- GNIS feature ID: 1552112

Mill Point is an unincorporated community in Pocahontas County, West Virginia, United States. Mill Point is at the junction of U.S. Route 219 and state routes 39 and 55, 2.5 miles (4.0 km) northeast of Hillsboro.

Mill Point was so named on account of there being several mills near the original town site.

== Notable person ==
- William Luther Pierce, white supremacist, nationalist and author of The Turner Diaries.
