= Kevin Alfred Strom =

American neo-Nazi (born 1956)

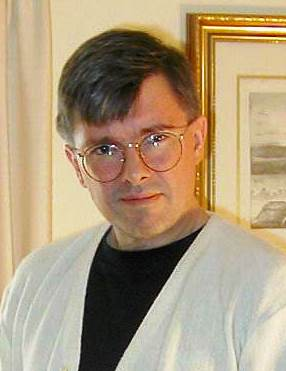
- Strom in 2006
- Born: 1956 (age 69–70); Washington, D.C.
- Other name: Philip Carey
- Organization: National Alliance
- Known for: Neo-Nazi activism
- Notable work: National Vanguard
- Spouse: Kirsten Kaiser (divorced)
- Children: 3
- Website: www.kevinalfredstrom.com

Kevin Alfred Strom (born 1956) is an American white nationalist and neo-Nazi. A member of the neo-Nazi group the National Alliance (NA), previously led by William Luther Pierce, he has edited their National Vanguard magazine from the 1980s.

In the 1980s, Strom created a neo-Nazi pirate radio station, Voice of Tomorrow, which became controversial among the hobbyist radio community. He later created a legal radio show for the National Alliance, American Dissident Voices. After a National Alliance leadership dispute involving Pierce's successor Erich Gliebe, Strom founded another neo-Nazi organization, the National Vanguard, as a schism from the NA in 2005.

In 2007, Strom was arrested for possession of child pornography, which led to the National Vanguard dissolving. He pleaded guilty and was convicted in April 2008; he was sentenced to 23 months in prison, though was released after less than 5 months. In 2014, he was brought back into the National Alliance by Gliebe's successor, William White Williams.

== Early life ==
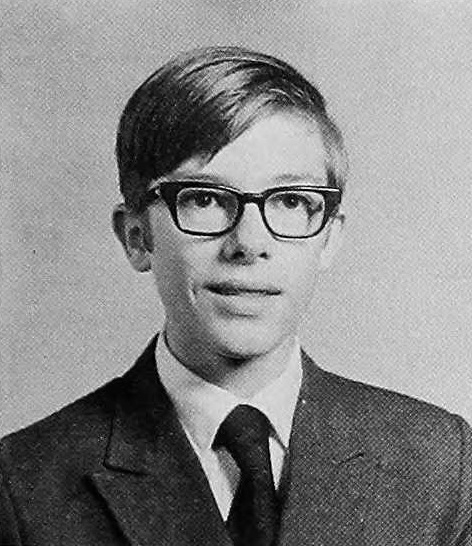
Strom's 1972 sophomore yearbook photo at Thomas Jefferson High School

Strom was born in 1956 and grew up in Washington, D.C. He was raised a Lutheran. Strom had a poor relationship with his father, an alcoholic who verbally abused him. When Strom was in his twenties his father killed himself.

In high school, he developed a right-wing anticommunist ideology. Strom indicates a high school teacher who shared his hatred of communism introduced him to the John Birch Society (JBS) where he first met members of the explicitly white supremacist National Alliance (NA).

== White supremacy ==
=== National Alliance under Pierce ===
Strom attended NA meetings throughout the 1970s, working for the organization as a broadcast engineer after he graduated high school. Working under the NA's leader William Luther Pierce, Strom became a believer in the concept of a Zionist Occupied Government in the United States, and a neo-Nazi. He became very close to Pierce, and according to his then-wife, Strom saw him as a father figure. As a result of Strom's influence, Pierce bought the white supremacist Resistance Records. During a 1990 visit by Nelson Mandela to the United States, Strom was arrested for assaulting a police officer at a pro-apartheid rally outside the South African embassy. The charges were later dropped.

Strom was also close with far right activist Revilo P. Oliver; he was a speaker at his funeral. He wrote the preface to Revilo's posthumous 2001 book The Origins of Christianity, and published his 2002 book The Jewish Strategy. He operates a website cataloguing Oliver's work.

He edited the NA's magazine National Vanguard beginning in the 1980s. He edited a book collection of articles in the magazine and its predecessor, The Best of ATTACK! and National Vanguard Tabloid, published by the NA's National Vanguard Books.

=== Radio stations ===
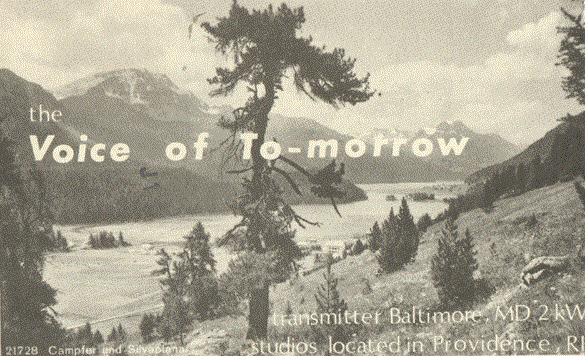
Postcard used to announce the launch of Voice of Tomorrow, a pirate radio station created by Strom.

Strom started Radio Vanguard International in 1983, shortly after renaming it Voice of Tomorrow, an unlicensed or pirate radio station known for its neo-Nazi content. Strom ran the radio station out of a mobile van specially equipped for radio. Voice of Tomorrow was one of a few "clandestine" pirate radio stations; in announcing it, Strom used the name "Philip Carey". The radio station's actual affiliations and broadcast location were not known at this time. According to Andrew Yoder in his book on pirate radio, it was one of the most well-known pirate radio stations in North America.

Unusually for a pirate radio station, it announced its creation by mailing professional postcards to potential listeners, and launched at its announced time. It was known for its high production values, approaching that of professional radio. With a powerful radio signal, it was heard across the eastern United States. The interval signal was wolf howls and the theme was Nazi music. It was widely denounced by hobbyist radio publications for its neo-Nazi content, resulting in a free speech debate among the hobbyist radio community. It operated irregularly. Voice of Tomorrow ceased operations in 1990.

In the early 1990s, Strom established American Dissident Voices, initially called National Vanguard Radio, a (non-pirate) radio show for the National Alliance, espousing antisemitic views. In his broadcasts, he criticized the "patriot" mindset held by much of the far-right; he also described himself as a non-Christian and criticized Christianity. By 1996 it was suspected that there was an affiliation between American Dissident Voices and Voice of Tomorrow due to the commonalities in style, content, and the voice of the announcer. According to Strom's wife and the Southern Poverty Law Center, he was the creator of the program.

In a 1993 broadcast for American Dissident Voices, entitled "All America Must Know the Terror That is Upon Us", Strom stated: "To determine the true rulers of any society, all you must do is ask yourself this question: Who is it that I am not permitted to criticize?" This has been paraphrased as "To learn who rules over you, simply find out who you are not allowed to criticize" and erroneously attributed to the philosopher Voltaire, including by Australian politician Cory Bernardi, actor John Cusack, U.S. Representative Thomas Massie, and Elon Musk. A transcript of one of his radio broadcasts on American Dissident Voices was also carried by the website of Al Jazeera English in March 2005. George Michael described Strom as "in the forefront of building bridges with extremists from across the political spectrum", writing that "he occasionally makes veiled entreaties to the Palestinians and other Arabs", with Strom claiming that their true, mutual enemies are "the Jewish power structure". Strom later lost control of American Dissident Voices.

=== National Vanguard ===
Pierce died from cancer in 2002, with Strom assumed to succeed him. However, Pierce was succeeded as leader of the National Alliance by Erich Gliebe, much to Strom's displeasure, though he came to support Gliebe. In 2003, Strom attended a meeting to welcome David Duke following his release from prison. He was given control of American Dissident Voices once again under Gliebe's leadership. National Vanguard magazine was brought online as a website in the early 2000s, operated by Strom for the National Alliance.

During the weekend of April 16–17, 2005, Strom and several other members became involved in a leadership dispute with Gliebe and Shaun Walker; Strom launched a petition for Gliebe to resign as leader, saying that his leadership was incompetent and he was unduly financially benefiting from the organization. Gliebe accused Strom of attempting to seize power and, with several others, Strom was expelled.

In response, Strom and some other expelled members founded the National Vanguard, headquartered in Charlottesville, Virginia. Claiming that his new organization was the true successor to the NA, Strom continued his weekly radio broadcasts and used the National Vanguard's website to host and promote the views of other racists, including David Duke. It took its name from the National Alliance's magazine, the National Vanguard. Strom also took their website domain, previously used for the magazine, with him; he had anticipated the dispute and previously secretly transferred the domain to his wife. He continued its distribution of white supremacist materials.

National Vanguard, like its parent organization, was a white nationalist, neo-Nazi organization. Ed Fields, editor of the white supremacist newspaper The Truth at Last, was one member to leave the NA and join the National Vanguard. In the wake of Hurricane Katrina, which struck the US Gulf Coast on August 29, 2005, a National Vanguard First Response Team was organized to help only white families in Alabama and Mississippi on September 20, 2005. The same year, National Vanguard showcased the pop-music duo Prussian Blue, twin sisters from Bakersfield, California, Lynx and Lamb Gaede, whom the organization hoped would "be breaking new ground... creating an entire genre of pro-White music" that will cross over to mainstream audiences.

Both the National Vanguard and the National Alliance continued to be beset by operational issues, with several of the National Vanguard's initial members leaving. In September 2006, there were disputes within the National Vanguard, with some members attempting to move the group's headquarters to Sacramento, California.

=== Child pornography possession ===
On January 4, 2007, Strom was arrested in Greene County, Virginia, on charges of possession of child pornography and witness tampering. The grand jury later added the accusation of receiving child pornography, seducing a 10-year old, and witness intimidation. Judge Norman K. Moon threw out both charges due to lack of evidence; he further commented "I think there is overwhelming evidence that [Strom] was sexually drawn to this child, and was obsessing over this child". Early in 2007, the group's parent company was legally liquidated by the state of Virginia, causing money problems. Following Strom's initial arrest, he resigned, and the National Vanguard was disbanded in March 2007. A posting on their website advertised a replacement organization, European Americans United (EAU).

At the plea hearing on January 14, 2008, Strom pleaded guilty to one count of possession of child pornography in exchange for the other charges to be dropped. He was sentenced to 23 months in prison in April 2008. Strom told the court before being sentenced that he was "not a pedophile" and was "in fact the precise opposite of what has been characterized in this case", saying he had been "unwillingly" possessing 10 images of child pornography and that those came from an online forum he had visited which had been "flooded with spam", which included "sleazy, tragic" pictures of children. The judge of the case responded: "Mr. Strom, you pled guilty to charges that now you're saying you're innocent. I prefer people plead not guilty than put it on me". Strom was released from prison on September 3, 2008.

=== National Alliance under Will Williams ===
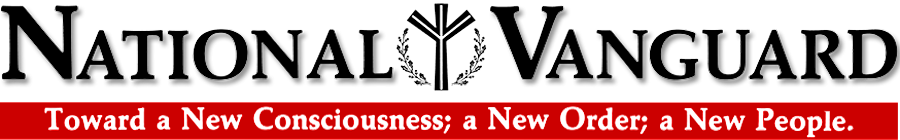
Logo of the National Vanguard magazine, edited by Strom.

Strom spent the next few years outside of the white supremacist movement. After years of the National Alliance floundering under Gliebe's leadership, former National Alliance member William White Williams planned to take power. In 2013, Gliebe entirely ended the National Alliance's existence as a membership organization for unclear reasons. The same year, Williams met up with Strom; while Gliebe still led the original National Alliance, Strom and Williams attempted to build a new one. They restarted the NA's radio show American Dissident Voices, which Gliebe had ceased. Strom continued the National Vanguard magazine as a website. He continues to make Pierce's writings and speeches available online.

At the same time, other members of the National Alliance, led by Jim Ring and Pierce's brother Sandy Pierce, formed the National Alliance Reform and Restoration Group (NARRG), also attempting to take over the National Alliance; while they also disliked Gliebe, they criticized Williams, mostly due to his friendship with Strom and his previous conviction. Williams has claimed that Strom was not guilty and had been "framed".

In March 2014, Gliebe, facing a lawsuit from other National Alliance members, resigned as chairman and gave leadership of the original National Alliance to Williams, shocking other members of the organization. Williams brought back the National Alliance, with Strom now on board as their communications director. This was controversial and unpopular among other National Alliance members due to Strom's previous conviction. In December 2014, Williams was not allowed at a white supremacist summit due to his promotion of Strom. Williams was later temporarily banned from the National Alliance headquarters, which resulted in Strom becoming effectively the leader of the few remaining members of the National Alliance for a time.

== Personal life ==
Strom had three children with his first wife, Kirsten Kaiser. Their marriage ended in 1997. Since their marriage ended, Kaiser has spoken about her life with Strom in several interviews. She has also written a book, The Bondage of Self, on her experiences with Strom and the National Alliance. He remarried in 2000, wedding his second wife, Elisha, also a neo-Nazi activist. She testified against him in the child pornography case and stated she wished they had sentenced him to death. Will Williams introduced him to a woman who worked for the National Alliance, Meredith Keller, who he was engaged to in 2015.
