= Erich Gliebe =

American neo-Nazi (born 1963)

- Born: Erich Josef Gliebe; 1963 (age 62–63); Cleveland, Ohio, U.S.
- Other name: The Aryan Barbarian
- Occupations: Boxer, magazine editor, chairman
- Organizations: National Alliance, Resistance Records

Erich Josef Gliebe (born 1963) is an American former neo-Nazi, and former boxer. In his youth, he was a professional boxer by the ring name of "The Aryan Barbarian". He joined the neo-Nazi group the National Alliance in the 1990s, and was the head of its affiliated record label Resistance Records. He also edited the label's music magazine, Resistance.

Following the death of the National Alliance's first leader, William Pierce, in 2002, Gliebe became its chairman. His leadership was generally considered poor; under his leadership, the group went from the most significant neo-Nazi group in the United States to functionally irrelevant. Membership dropped from 1,400 to 75, and it experienced several schisms. Gliebe exited the neo-Nazi movement in 2014, simultaneously giving leadership of the organization to Will Williams.

== Early life and boxing career ==
Erich Josef Gliebe was born in 1963 in Cleveland, Ohio. His father was a German immigrant to the United States who had served in the German Wehrmacht during World War II, and was wounded fighting the Russians; his father taught him to deny the Holocaust and the tenets of Nazi beliefs. As a child, Gliebe learned the German language and folk dancing. He was raised in Ohio, living in Cleveland and Parma. He attended Normandy High School and graduated in 1981. He credited his later political views to his father, alongside the "drug use, lack of honor and discipline, cowardliness, and total lack of racial identity" he had witnessed in the communities around him growing up, which he blamed on "the Jewish dominated society".

In the late 1980s, he was a professional boxer using the ring name of "The Aryan Barbarian". Gliebe was undefeated in five professional fights in the light-heavyweight division over a period of three years. His bouts were at venues within West Virginia. Four fights were won by TKO and one fight was won by a split decision. He was also a trainer for a time. He later said about this profession that: "in what other occupation can a man beat someone up (especially a nonwhite) get paid for it and not worry about going to jail?"

== White supremacy ==
=== White power music and Resistance Records ===
Gliebe left boxing in 1990 to join the neo-Nazi group National Alliance (NA), which was led by William Luther Pierce. He became interested in white supremacy through the white power music scene. He was employed locally, working as a tool and die maker and worked locally in the white power music scene, utilizing the name "Life Rune Records". For several years, he led the Cleveland chapter of the organization. Pierce considered him one of the best members of the group; he regularly sold Pierce's novel The Turner Diaries and booked booths at local gun shows. He staged "European-American" culture festivals in an effort to get new recruits. Gliebe also organized speaking events for the Holocaust denier David Irving.

When Pierce bought the Canadian white power music label Resistance Records, Pierce had Gliebe head the record label, as he maintained connections to several white power bands. He promoted their bands and signed bands to the label. Gliebe also edited the label's music magazine, Resistance. Gliebe was the CEO of Resistance Records. He was well regarded among skinheads (the primary readers of the magazine) particularly due to his past as a boxer, but he was sometimes considered out of step with the other elements of the subculture. He soon issued an apology for, according to Leonard Zeskind, "not understanding the nuances of the skinhead subculture". When the magazine issued an article critical of neo-Nazi leader Robert Jay Mathews (the leader of the Order, which had orchestrated several murders) in the magazine, Gliebe was again forced to apologize, as many neo-Nazis viewed him as a martyr.

Gliebe was active in recruiting to the white supremacist cause, utilizing music as a way to broaden the NA's appeal, and was especially active in recruiting teenagers. He described white power music as a force for "awakening and mobilizing the White Youth of today into a revolutionary force to destroy the system", calling it "resistance music". In 2000, the Southern Poverty Law Center listed him as one of the six "rising stars" of the radical right. Following the 9/11 attacks, he praised the hijackers and their discipline. Under Gliebe's leadership, Resistance Records brought in 1 million annually in 2002.

=== As leader of the National Alliance ===
Six days after Pierce's death in July 2002, Gliebe was appointed the new Chairman by the Board of Directors. He became leader of the group, and continued to lead Resistance Records. Gliebe's leadership of the NA was widely considered to be poor. Shortly after he became leader, it was revealed that, several months prior to Pierce's death, he had given a speech where he criticized other members of the white supremacist movement, calling them "hobbyists", "morons", and dwellers in a "make-believe world". He controversially fired NA spokesperson Billy Roper, and quickly began to alienate members, causing a backlash within the NA leadership.

Due to Gliebe's leadership decisions, the National Alliance's membership declined precipitously; the group went from the most significant neo-Nazi group in the United States to functionally irrelevant. Membership dropped from 1,400 under Pierce to 75 in 2012, and experienced several schisms. In 2004 several important members defected due to dissatisfaction with Gliebe's leadership. Gliebe was also, in the 2000s, embroiled in an extensive and public personal drama surrounding his wife, her activities, and his sexual behavior, in what professor of sociology Randy Blazak called an "X-rated soap opera". In 2004, a former member of the National Alliance accused Gliebe's NA of "purchas[ing] more than $50,000 worth of swastika-soled boots, supposedly made in China", among other questionable financial purchases.

In April 2005, NA media director Kevin Strom started a petition trying to get Gliebe to step down. In response, Gliebe fired him. Gliebe then fired most of the rest of the leadership after they attempted to challenge his leadership, Strom and his associates proceeded to found their own organization, the National Vanguard, claiming Pierce's legacy. Gliebe briefly handed over leadership to Shaun Walker in May 2005 due to these concerns, but he resumed control after Walker was charged with civil rights violations. In April 2009, it was revealed that Gliebe's name was on the list of people banned from entering the United Kingdom. In 2013, Gliebe sold Resistance Records, and ended the National Alliance's existence as a membership organization. It is unclear why; it may have been because there were so few members remaining, or in an effort to win a Canadian court case. Simultaneously, he attempted to sell most of their West Virginia property.

In March 2014, Gliebe, alongside two other top members of the NA, was sued by other and former members of the National Alliance, the National Alliance Reform and Restoration Group (NARRG), in an effort to remove him from the group; the lawsuit accused him of mismanaging the organization, of bribing other NA members, and of using it as his personal fund source. In response, he resigned as leader in October 2014; however, instead of giving the organization over to the NARRG, Gliebe handed over leadership of the National Alliance to Will Williams, shocking other members of the group; Gliebe wanted to leave to care for his son. He has since ceased involvement in the white supremacist and neo-Nazi movements.
