= National Youth Alliance =

American right-wing political group

- Their logo, as featured in Attack!
- Abbreviation: NYA
- Predecessor: Youth for Wallace
- Successor: Youth Action (Carto); National Alliance (Pierce)
- Formation: 1968; 58 years ago
- Founder: Willis Carto
- Dissolved: 1970 (when group split), or 1974 (when Pierce renamed it to the NA)
- Type: Right-wing political organization
- Legal status: Defunct
- Location: United States
- National chairman: William Luther Pierce
- Main organ: Attack!

The National Youth Alliance (NYA) was an American right-wing political group founded by Willis Carto, head of the right-wing Liberty Lobby. It was reorganized from another group founded by Carto, Youth for Wallace, in 1968, which was a campaign group for segregationist governor George Wallace. Its national chairman was William Luther Pierce. Their party organ was the magazine Attack!

The group split in 1970 in the face of a dispute between Carto and Pierce. The group schismed, with the Carto faction becoming Youth Action. Pierce's faction kept the name and Attack!, but he transformed it into the National Alliance in 1974, an explicitly neo-Nazi group.

== Background and founding ==
Willis Carto was a devotee of the writings of Francis Parker Yockey, and a Holocaust denier. He formed the Liberty Lobby and helped establish the Institute for Historical Review. Yockey's ideology was adopted by Carto as his own guiding ideology and that of the National Youth Alliance.

In 1968, Carto established Youth for Wallace (also Youth for George Wallace) as a youth group to support segregationist governor George Wallace's bid for president as American Independent Party candidate in 1968. The National Youth Alliance was reorganized from Youth for Wallace in 1969 when Wallace lost. The Liberty Letter periodical reported its founding in February 1969.

== Activities ==
Carto founded it in response to the rise in militant left ideology among college students; a vice-chairman declaired in 1969 that they aimed to "smash the campus red front", giving the "terror of the left [...] the greater terror of the right". The group was funded by Carto. It held congresses and elected its party officers. Their party outlet was the magazine Attack! established in 1969, its first issue being released in fall of that year. It was right wing, though at this time not explicitly neo-Nazi; it critiqued hippies and Israel, and published writings from Revilo P. Oliver.

Jeffrey Kaplan wrote of the NYA that:

The National Youth Alliance (NYA) never amounted to much, but unlike so many later far-right-wing "organizations," it did have more of a presence than a name on a postal box and a line of literature. The NYA elected officers and had several congresses— funded, of course, by Willis Carto. In reality, however, the National Youth Alliance foundered, because many potential adherents for the kind of broad coalition of young right wingers that the NYA envisioned could as easily opt for more socially acceptable groups, such as the Young Americans for Freedom (YAF).

Members were ideologically divided about neo-Nazism. The group did not publicly express neo-Nazi sentiments, though they were discussed internally. Carto recruited the neo-Nazi William Luther Pierce to be NYA chairman. Pierce had joined the NYA in 1970, shortly after leaving the National Socialist White People's Party (NSWPP), formerly the American Nazi Party (ANP), of which he had been a prominent member. Pierce began to publish Attack! James Mason, a devoted follower of Pierce, was a supporting member.

== Dissolution ==
This neo-Nazi elements became controversial. Several members became concerned that the group was being manipulated by Yockeyists, and denounced the group; they claimed that Carto said that Yockey followers should attempt to capture and infiltrate conservative groups. Several members left. Carto accused another member, Louis Byers, also a Yockey follower, of stealing their mailing list. This resulted in schisms and more than one National Youth Alliance existed at the time. A legal battle was held between many former NYA leaders, but none were successful against Carto.

By 1971, a rift had developed between Carto and Pierce. In the aftermath, the group split into factions. Carto's faction became known as Youth Action. Pierce kept the name National Youth Alliance, but he later transformed it into National Alliance in 1974. Pierce's National Alliance was an explicitly neo-Nazi group. Pierce took Attack! with him, though renamed it the National Vanguard in 1978.
