= National Alliance (United States) =

US white supremacist political organization

- Predecessor: National Youth Alliance
- Formation: 1974; 52 years ago
- Founder: William Luther Pierce
- Headquarters: Mill Point, West Virginia
- Members: 2,500 (2002)
- Chairman: Will Williams
- Main organ: National Vanguard
- Website: www.natall.com

The National Alliance is a white supremacist, neo-Nazi political organization founded by William Luther Pierce in 1974 and based in Mill Point, West Virginia. It was formed out of a split in the National Youth Alliance, an organization run by Pierce and Willis Carto. The National Alliance had several business ventures, including the record label Resistance Records, a book publisher, and several periodicals. It was the largest and most significant neo-Nazi group of its time.

Membership in 2002 was estimated at 2,500 with an annual income of $1 million. Membership declined after Pierce's death in 2002; Pierce was succeeded as leader of the National Alliance by Erich Gliebe. After a split in its ranks in 2005 and several power struggles, it lost most of its members and has greatly declined in influence.

== History ==
=== Background ===
The National Alliance was established by William Luther Pierce in 1974, renamed and restructured from another organization called the National Youth Alliance. Pierce had previously been a member of the National Socialist White People's Party, and was a long time associate of its leader George Lincoln Rockwell. After Rockwell was assassinated in 1967, his successor Matt Koehl became embroiled in a power struggle with Pierce, which resulted in Pierce leaving in 1970.

Pierce then created Youth for Wallace, an organization supporting the bid for the presidency of George Wallace, the former Governor of Alabama. Alongside Willis Carto, Youth for Wallace became the recruiting organization for their National Youth Alliance. Carto and Pierce had a falling out and the group split; Pierce's side kept the National Youth Alliance name, while Carto's became Youth Action.

=== 1970s to 1990s ===
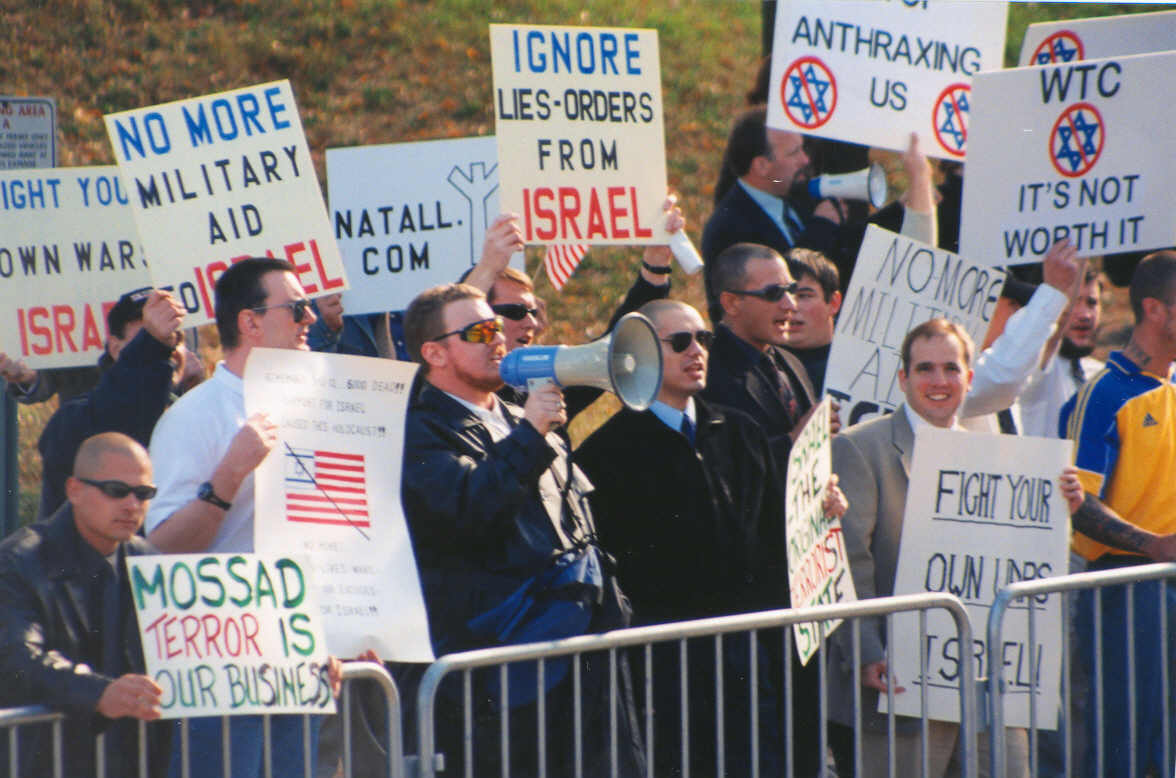
National Alliance members protesting outside the Embassy of Israel, Washington, D.C. in 2001, alleging Israeli complicity in the 9/11 attacks

Pierce renamed the National Youth Alliance and restructured it as the National Alliance in 1974. The National Alliance would become the largest and most significant neo-Nazi group of the time, and the most significant group to come out of the various schisms associated with the American Nazi Party. In 1978, claiming the National Alliance was an educational organization, Pierce applied for (and was denied) tax exemption by the Internal Revenue Service. Pierce appealed, but an appellate court upheld the IRS decision.

In 1985, Pierce moved his operations from Arlington County, Virginia, to a 346-acre (1.40 km^{2}) location in Mill Point, West Virginia, which he paid for with $95,000 in cash. At this location, he founded the Cosmotheist Community Church. In 1986, the church applied again, this time successfully, for federal, state, and local tax exemptions. It lost its state tax exemption for all but 60 acres, which had to be exclusively used for religious purposes.

In the 1980s, the neo-Nazi group The Order modeled itself after the organization depicted in The Turner Diaries; its founder, Robert Jay Mathews, had known Pierce and had been chosen to speak at one of the National Alliance conferences in 1983. The Order committed several murders and bank robberies to pursue white supremacist goals. Timothy McVeigh was in possession of a copy of The Turner Diaries at the time of his arrest following the Oklahoma City bombing. McVeigh bought copies of the book (published by the National Alliance), sold them at gun shows, and otherwise distributed them.

In 1997, two National Alliance members were charged with committing bank robberies in Florida and Connecticut. One of them admitted to channeling funds from the robberies to the National Alliance. He was charged with attempting to detonate a series of pipe bombs in order to divert attention from a future robbery.

==== Resistance Records ====
In 1999, Pierce bought Resistance Records, and with it, the white supremacist music magazine Resistance, from Todd Blodgett, who operated it for Carto. Pierce had supported the magazine since its inception and had written several articles for it previously. Pierce agreed to buy Carto's share of the company; he invested more money in Resistance and made Blodgett manager, tasking him to bring out the next issue. However, despite announcing a release date of June 1999, Blodgett was unable to get the issue out, angering Pierce and many skinheads. Pierce proceeded to force Blodgett out and take full control of the magazine.

Under Pierce's ownership, he had National Alliance member Erich Gliebe head the record label and edit Resistance; a former professional boxer, Gliebe was chosen due to his connections to several white power bands. The magazine was issued again (with issue 9) by the now National Alliance controlled Resistance Records in October 1999.

=== After Pierce's death ===
==== Erich Gliebe ====
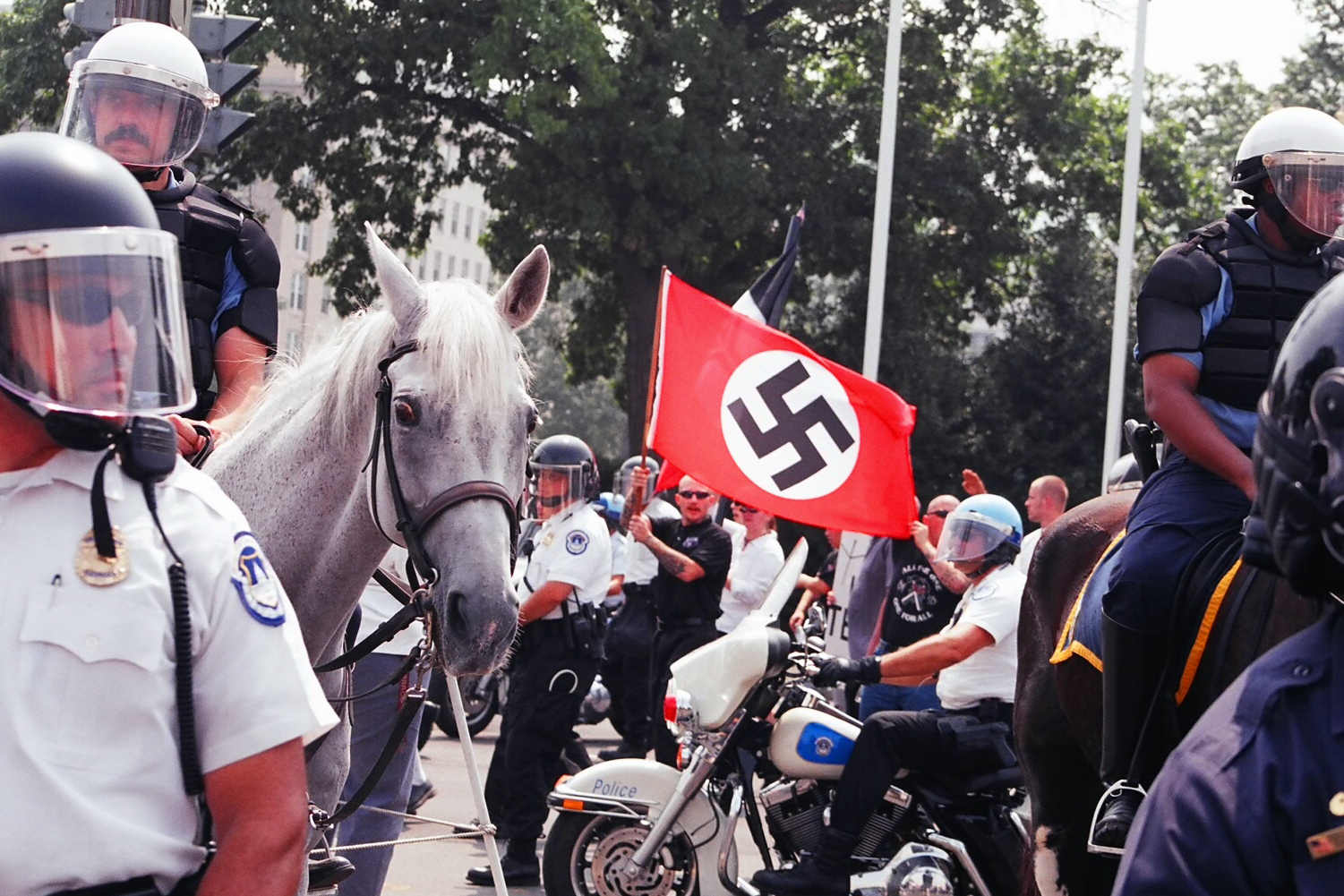
National Alliance member with a Nazi flag at a rally in Washington, D.C., August 2002

Shortly after Pierce's death in July 2002, Gliebe was appointed the new Chairman by the Board of Directors. He became leader of the group, and continued to lead Resistance Records. A series of power struggles began almost immediately after Pierce's death, with high-ranking members either resigning or being fired. A boycott of the National Alliance's Resistance Records label resulted in a steep drop-off in generated funds. Membership declined after Pierce's death.

Gliebe's leadership of the NA was widely considered to be poor. Their records sales and membership numbers decreased under Gliebe, hurting their finances. His actions caused a backlash within the group's membership and leadership; especially controversial actions included firing their spokesperson, Billy Roper, and the reveal of a controversial speech where he insulted other white supremacists.

Due to Gliebe's leadership decisions, the National Alliance's membership declined precipitously; the group went from the most significant neo-Nazi group in the United States to functionally irrelevant; membership dropped from 1,400 under Pierce to 75 in 2012, and experienced several schisms. In 2004 several important members defected due to dissatisfaction with Gliebe's leadership. Resistance magazine ceased printing in 2007 when their printer refused to continue business with them for ideological reasons.

==== Strom's coup attempt and the formation of National Vanguard ====
In April 2005, prominent Alliance member Kevin Alfred Strom, then editor of National Vanguard magazine, issued a declaration calling for Gliebe to step down. The Alliance's executive committee and most of its unit coordinators supported the action. Gliebe refused, claiming that the Alliance operated under the "Leadership Principle" and stating that he would not yield to any coup. Strom formed a new group called National Vanguard. In response, Gliebe fired him.

Shortly after the attempted coup by Strom, Gliebe resigned as chairman of the Alliance and briefly appointed Shaun Walker as his successor. However, following Walker's arrest in June 2006, Gliebe again assumed leadership of the organization. By that year, paid membership for the Alliance had declined to fewer than 800 and the paid staff was down to only ten people.

In 2013, Gliebe ended the National Alliance's existence as a membership organization. It is unclear why; it may have been because there were so few members remaining, or in an effort to win a Canadian court case. Simultaneously, he attempted to sell the majority of the National Alliance's West Virginia property.

==== Will Williams' coup ====
In 2014, National Alliance member Will Williams, previously its membership coordinator, but who had left the NA shortly before Pierce's death, took over the National Alliance, as Gliebe was attempting to liquidate the organization's assets. At the time, several National Alliance members who were dissatisfied with Gliebe's leadership, the National Alliance Reform & Restoration Group (NARRG) were filing a civil suit against Gliebe. Behind the scenes, Williams attempted to convince Gliebe to make him leader of the National Alliance; despite their previous feuds, Gliebe agreed. Williams was made the chairman in 2014. This action surprised the NARRG, who expressed their disapproval of Williams; according to the Southern Poverty Law Center (SPLC), they called him a "racial gadfly" and accused him of opportunism. They also criticized him for bringing back Strom, his friend, due to his conviction for possession of child pornography.

With Strom, Williams brought back the National Alliance, though the Southern Poverty Law Center (SPLC) said by 2015 that he "has effectively accelerated the group’s decline at a pace even faster than the dozen or so years of Erich Gliebe’s tenure". In 2015, an accountant and fellow white supremacist, Randolph Dilloway, was hired to audit the NA's books by Williams. By 2015, Williams had managed to rebuild the group somewhat, to about 100 dues-paying members. He secretly hired an accountant, Ralph Dilloway, to do a financial audit; Dilloway found many instances of financial impropriety. Dilloway claimed Williams ignored his concerns. After an altercation at the headquarters on May 3, 2015, where he claimed that Williams had held him at gunpoint, Dilloway fled and attempted to seek protection as a whistleblower; the Southern Poverty Law Center claimed he contacted them on May 6. Williams said the financial issues had been committed under Gliebe, and said that Dilloway had stolen their financial records. According to a lawsuit which was filed by a former Baltimore attorney against the SPLC, Dilloway left the NA headquarters and released documents that he had scanned to the SPLC.

In December 2015, Williams was arrested and charged with battery after he allegedly hit and strangled a female employee on the grounds of the Mill Point compound. He was convicted, briefly incarcerated, and placed on probation. Immediately after, Williams was banned from the NA compound in West Virginia pursuant to a court order stemming from his 2015 arrest. By 2016, the National Alliance had only a few dozen members.

By 2020, Williams had re-assumed control of the group; Williams said in a letter to a newspaper sent from Laurel Bloomery, Tennessee (allegedly the NA's headquarters) that "(The National Alliance does) not appreciate being called 'haters' or being associated with some 'hate movement'." In 2020, Williams claimed that the National Alliance "(is) back. We are definitely back". ABC News noted in 2020 that the influence of the group has faded and they are no longer as prominent. Under Williams' leadership, the group relocated to Tennessee.

== Ideology and activities ==
The group is white supremacist and neo-Nazi in orientation. The organization produced and broadcast a radio/internet show named "American Dissident Voices", and the organization also published a National Alliance Bulletin. It distributed the National Vanguard periodical and it maintained a website which was also named National Vanguard. Its publication Attack! was started by Pierce to increase membership in the National Youth Alliance in 1969. He published and edited the publication. It was later retitled National Vanguard. National Vanguard Books, Inc. was the book publishing firm of the National Alliance. Under Pierce's leadership, they had annual conventions in Arlington, Virginia.

The organization ran a white power record label which was called Resistance Records. In 2002, it released the video game Ethnic Cleansing. As of 2025, Cosmotheist Books is also associated with the organization. The company sells Pierce's books. The spiritual aspect of the National Alliance's ideology is espoused by the Cosmotheist Community Church.

== See also ==
- Fascism in North America#United States
  - Fascism in the United States
    - Nazism in the Americas
- Spokane bombing attempt
- List of neo-Nazi organizations
- List of organizations designated by the SPLC as hate groups#Neo-Nazi
- List of white nationalist organizations
- Nationalist Front
- Radical right (United States)
