= Philip J. Carey =

American judge and politician

Philip J. Carey (March 28, 1918 – August 14, 1996) was an American judge and politician.

Born in Chicago, Illinois, Carey graduated from De La Salle High School in 1936. He received his bachelor's degree from Spring Hill College in 1940. He served in the United States Navy during World War II. In 1950, Carey received his law degree from John Marshall Law School and was admitted to the Illinois bar. Carey served in the Illinois Senate from 1959 to 1963 and was a Democrat. He then served as chairman of the Illinois Industrial Commission from 1963 to 1969. Carey served as a delegate in the Illinois Constitutional Convention of 1970. From 1976 to 1992, Carey served as a judge on the Cook County Circuit Court. Carey died at the Company of Mary Hospital in Evergreen Park, Illinois.
