= William Luther Pierce =

American neo-Nazi (1933–2002)

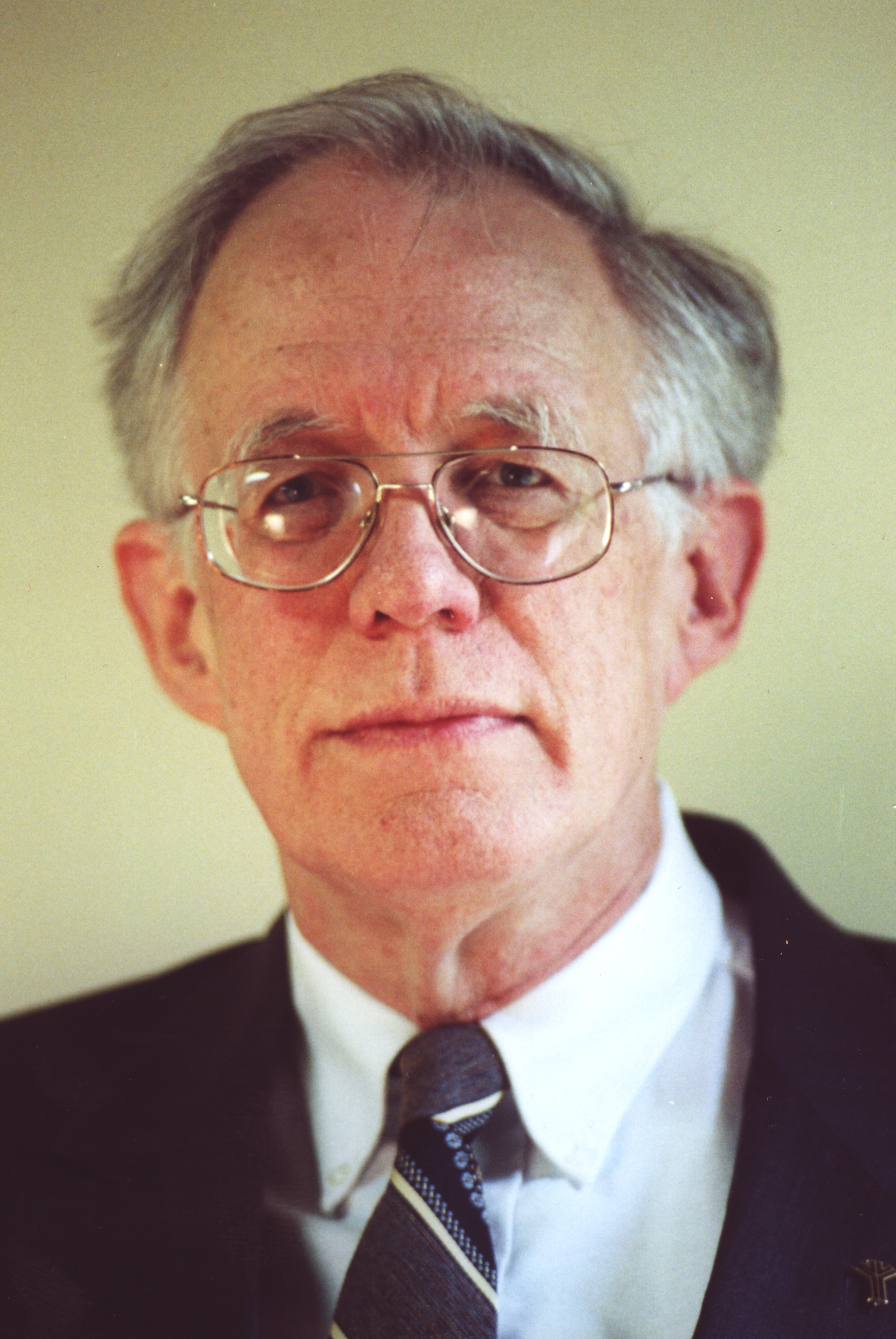
- Pierce in 2001
- Born: William Luther Pierce III; September 11, 1933; Atlanta, Georgia, U.S.
- Died: July 23, 2002 (aged 68); Mill Point, West Virginia, U.S.
- Other name: Andrew Macdonald
- Education: Rice University (BA); CU Boulder (MSc, PhD)
- Occupation: Professor of Physics at Oregon State University
- Organization: National Alliance
- Notable work: The Turner Diaries (1978); Hunter (1989)
- Movement: Neo-Nazism, white nationalism
- Children: 2

William Luther Pierce III (September 11, 1933 – July 23, 2002) was an American neo-Nazi political activist. For more than 30 years, he was one of the highest-profile individuals of the white nationalist movement. A physicist by profession, he authored the novels The Turner Diaries and Hunter under the pen name Andrew Macdonald. The first novel inspired multiple terrorist attacks, including the 1995 Oklahoma City bombing. Pierce founded the white nationalist National Alliance, an organization which he led for almost 30 years.

Born in Atlanta, Georgia, Pierce received a bachelor's degree in physics from Rice University in 1955 as well as a doctorate from the University of Colorado Boulder in 1962. He became an assistant professor of physics at Oregon State University in that year. In 1965, he left his tenure at Oregon State University and became a senior researcher for the aerospace manufacturer Pratt & Whitney in Connecticut. He moved to the Washington, D.C. area and became an associate of George Lincoln Rockwell, founder of the American Nazi Party, who was assassinated in 1967. Pierce became co-leader of the National Youth Alliance, which split in 1974, with Pierce founding the National Alliance.

Pierce's novel The Turner Diaries (1978) depicts a violent revolution in the United States, followed by a world war and the extermination of non-white races. Another novel by Pierce, Hunter (1989) portrays the actions of a lone-wolf white supremacist assassin. In 1985, Pierce relocated the headquarters of the National Alliance to Hillsboro, West Virginia, where he founded the Cosmotheist Community Church. Pierce spent the rest of his life in West Virginia hosting a weekly show, American Dissident Voices, and overseeing his publications, National Vanguard magazine (originally titled Attack!), as well as books which were published by his publishing firm National Vanguard Books, Inc. and the white power music label Resistance Records.

== Early life ==
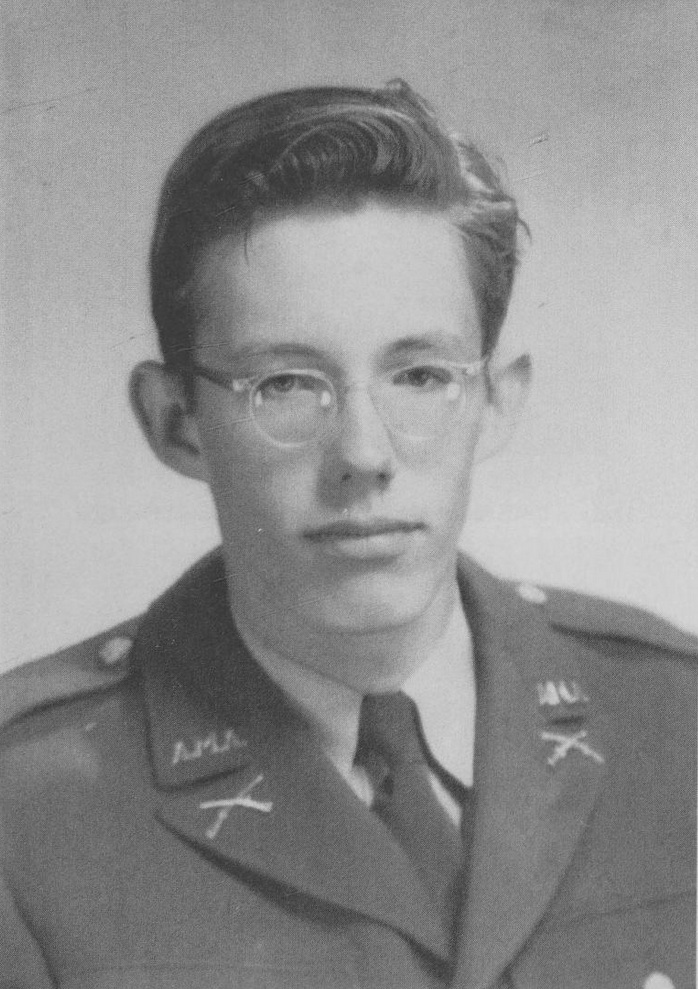
Pierce in a high school military academy uniform at Allen Military Academy

William Luther Pierce III was born in Atlanta, Georgia, on September 11, 1933. He was the eldest son of Marguerite Ferrell, a journalist, and William Luther Pierce II, an insurance salesman, who married in 1929. His father had served in World War I. Through his mother, Pierce's great-great-grandfather was Thomas H. Watts, the governor of Alabama and attorney general of the Confederate States of America. He had one younger brother, Sanders "Sandy" Pierce.

His family moved to Norfolk, Virginia, with his father's insurance business when Pierce was four years old. Pierce's upbringing was at times difficult. Pierce's son, Kelvin, described Pierce as having been born to a mother who rarely showed affection and an alcoholic father who entirely ignored him; Marguerite would pay Pierce to find the alcohol that William Sr. stashed around the house. Pierce's father was killed in a car accident involving a teenaged driver on January 30, 1943, when Pierce was nine years old.

Following his father's death, Pierce and his brother were supported by their mother, and moved throughout the Southern United States. From the age of 10 on, Pierce worked odd jobs to help his family. Pierce attended public schools throughout the South, attending junior high in Dallas, Texas, until the family moved to Montgomery, Alabama. When his mother remarried, Pierce was sent to a military academy. His last two years in high school were spent at the Allen Military Academy in Bryan, Texas, where he did well academically. He worked at the school's chemistry stockrooms. Pierce later said that as a teen he had been "sort of a nerdy kid without social skills", awkward around women and with few friends. His teenage hobbies and interests were chemistry, electronics, and reading science fiction works, particularly the pulp magazine Planet Stories.

== Education and physics career ==
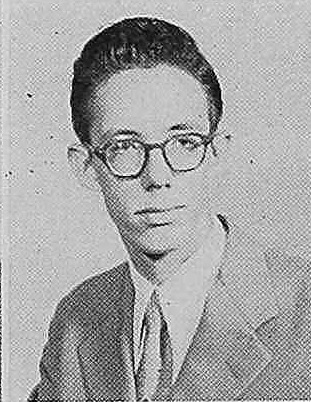
Pierce at Rice University, aged 18 or 19

Pierce earned a full scholarship to attend Rice University in Houston in 1951. He graduated from Rice in 1955 with a bachelor's degree. He worked at Los Alamos National Laboratory for a time in mid-1955, then did his graduate studies at California Institute of Technology starting later that year. At the University of Colorado Boulder, he earned a master's degree and a doctorate in 1962. His doctorate thesis was entitled "Electrically Induced Nuclear Quadrupole Spin Transitions In A GaAs Single Crystal" and he studied under the physicist W. H. Tantila. In 1957, Pierce married Patricia Jones, a mathematician whom he met while he was attending the California Institute of Technology. They had twin sons, Kelvin and Erik, born in 1960.

After getting his doctorate, Pierce taught physics as an assistant professor at Oregon State University from 1962 to 1965. The only organization he belonged to at this time was the American Physical Society. A contemporary article from The Oregonian said of his time teaching at OSU that there was "much respect for Pierce, but not much love", particularly among his students. He was regarded as a very hard worker who never took breaks. His assistant reported that he was unpopular owing to a difficulty with getting along with him. Pierce's tenure as assistant professor at Oregon State University coincided with the rise of the civil rights movement and later the counterculture.

At this time, Pierce was a registered Republican, though he did not consider himself a member of the party and voted independently. At this time he considered himself largely uninterested in politics. During his education, Pierce paid little attention to the wider world; he claimed that he had initially been sympathetic to the idea of Black civil rights, but was suspicious of integration as damaging freedom of association. He was inflamed by what he viewed as a media bias against segregationists; when some of his colleagues blamed this on Jews, he became more interested in racial matters, and became increasingly militant in his thoughts on race. He blamed Jews for the civil rights movement, along with the protests against the Vietnam War. According to his son Kelvin, after Pierce became interested in racial matters he ceased to pay much attention to his children, outside of beating them. Pierce regularly physically abused his children.

Beginning in 1962, he was a member of the anti-communist John Birch Society, and this at the time appealed to him. He did not agree with the widely held Bircher belief that all social movements they disliked were communist plots, and their refusal to discuss racial topics; he later wrote of the John Birch Society experience that "I quickly found out that the two topics on which I wanted an intelligent discussion—race and Jews—were precisely the two topics Birch Society members were forbidden to discuss". He resigned the next year, viewing the Birchers as "too passive" on racial topics. He saw the anti-communism as a distraction from the true issue, race, and expressed his disappointment that they were opposed to the civil rights movement, but "weren't willing to deal with it on a racial basis". In a 1966 interview he described his interest in Nazism increasing when he heard of interracial marriages among his coworkers at OSU, which disgusted him. His later decision to leave his job for unpaid work writing neo-Nazi literature baffled his OSU coworker David B. Nicodemus, though some of his students and an assistant were not surprised, saying he was fixated on Adolf Hitler and had read Mein Kampf in its original German.

Pierce left his job as a professor in June 1965 to become a senior researcher for the aerospace manufacturer Pratt & Whitney in Connecticut. In his field he was generally successful. He worked as a senior research associate physicist at Pratt, earning a $15,400 a year salary. He received government security clearance for this job but never actually worked on classified projects. He directed a United States Air Force grant of $35,000 on semiconductors. There, he spent his time undertaking his own study of political and historical topics, which radicalized him further, reading alarmist books about race at the Yale University Library. He was not openly racist with his coworkers; when the ANP was investigated, his coworkers described him as a "first-class physicist", but also "impenetrable", and said they had an "intense dislike of him as a person". He was known as a loner and for the lack of instruction he gave subordinate researchers.

== White supremacy ==
=== American Nazi Party ===
In 1963, Pierce saw on television a clip of protests against George Lincoln Rockwell, the founder of the American Nazi Party (ANP); intrigued by Rockwell, he struck up a correspondence with him. Pierce found Rockwell personally impressive, and the party's ideology appealed to him, but he disliked their explicit Nazi imagery. According to Rockwell, Pierce mailed him complaining Rockwell had some things right but was thinking too small, to which Rockwell said Pierce should do something himself. When he moved to work with Pratt & Whitney, he began visiting Rockwell at his headquarters in Arlington, Virginia. He and Rockwell became increasingly close. After only a few months of work, his performance worsened and he attempted unsuccessfully to drive a car through a picket line of protestors during a wildcat strike at the plant he worked at. He took a vacation from Pratt & Whitney in May 1966, returning to resign abruptly after less than a year of employment, claiming he had been writing hours a day for months and wished to be a writer.

Afterwards, Pierce moved his family to Virginia. His wife became a university math teacher, and initially supporting Pierce in his aims. However, she did not agree with his political views. Pierce started a gun sales business, which sold machine guns. Due to the Gun Control Act of 1968, the business closed. He was the best educated associate of Rockwell, as well as the party's most enthusiastic promoter of violent action, believing that a National Socialist revolution required violence. Despite this he did not participate in the group's street actions. Pierce advocated Nordic superiority within the movement and said the leaders of the group should only come from "pure Germanic stock". He disliked and insulted ANP member John Patler on account of his ethnically Greek background, as did high ranking ANP member Matt Koehl. When, as a result of Patler's influence, Rockwell argued for a broader definition of the white race (including Slavs and Mediterraneans as white), Pierce and Koehl abhorred the idea and resisted, resulting in a schism in the party leadership, though Rockwell eventually prevailed.

Pierce's activities within the ANP were mostly centered around writing and publication of ANP materials. In 1966, Pierce became the editor of the World Union of National Socialists quarterly ideological journal, National Socialist World, for which he split the production costs with Rockwell. The publication was stylized like an academic quarterly and aimed at an academic racist audience. He was a close advisor to Rockwell and functioned as the ANP's "house intellectual". Pierce, interested in "racial esotericism", was largely responsible for the popularization of the works of Savitri Devi among the neo-Nazi and white nationalist movement. Pierce advised Rockwell on power and media tactics, largely responsible for Rockwell's publicity success with the 1966 Chicago "White Power" marches. Rockwell proposed a business partnership with Pierce, an "Extremist Speakers Bureau", offering a 20% commission on bookings for Pierce, who would be responsible for finding speakers. This never materialized. Pierce and Rockwell were largely in agreement; they shared a similar worldview and goals, but they also sometimes had disputes.

=== National Socialist White People's Party ===
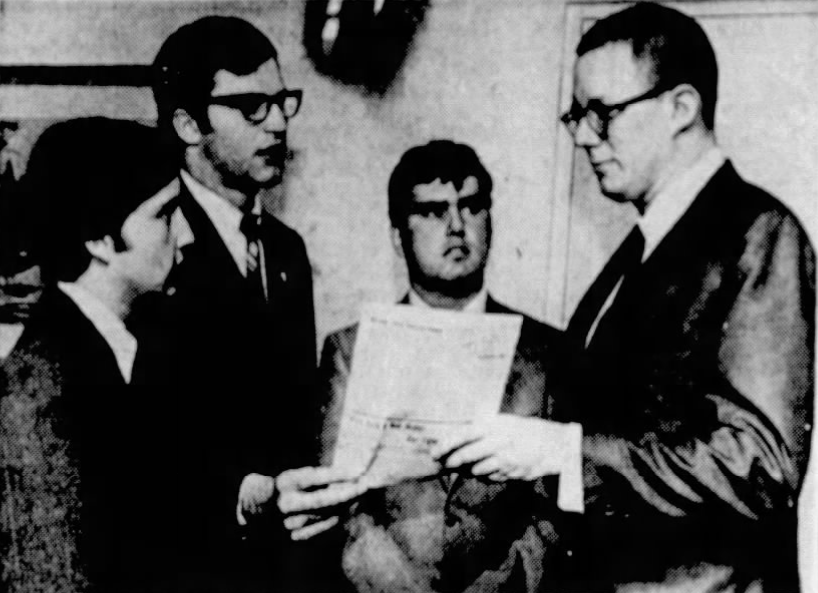
Pierce (right) before a lecture at the University of Scranton in 1970

Pierce did not actually join the ANP until it was renamed the National Socialist White People's Party (NSWPP) in January 1967. Rockwell was murdered by Patler later that year. There was some speculation, though it was never proven, that Pierce had something to do with it. However, Patler was ultimately convicted. Some ANP members argued there was a conspiracy and Koehl, Pierce, and a man named Robert Allison Lloyd had orchestrated Rockwell's murder. The day before the murder, Rockwell got into an argument with the three of them. One eyewitness claimed that he locked them out of their offices and said he would expel them. Rockwell's secretary and mistress Barbara von Goetz became convinced that the three of them had ordered Rockwell's killing and framed Patler to seize control of the party; Francis Joseph Smith, Rockwell's personal bodyguard, investigated on his own and concluded that the three of them had orchestrated Rockwell's murder. Afterwards Pierce stayed in the NSWPP, under the leadership of Koehl, becoming one of its primary leaders.

Pierce was at the time the chief voice for violent action in the party. Pierce attempted to organize university students to the cause and promoted a philosophy of "total revolution", bringing young militant neo-Nazis into the party. The other key member of this faction was James Mason, later the author of Siege, whom Pierce helped recruit into the party as a teenager. In 1968, he suggested to Mason, a teenage member of the party, that he move to the party's headquarters in lieu of murdering his school administration. Mason credited Pierce's intervention with saving both his life and other lives. Pierce became a prominent influence on Mason's life. Another was a teenage adherent, Joseph Tommasi. Pierce held Tommasi in high esteem for his militancy. In March 1969, a NSWPP phone line operated by Tommasi that played a prerecorded message by Pierce which advocated murdering Black people was shut down. Another Pierce message advocated murdering U.S. senators. That same year, born of their ideological commonality, Pierce and Tommasi launched the National Socialist Liberation Front (NSLF) as a youth wing of the NSWPP, aiming for it to appeal to white college students. He was sometimes invited to speak on university campuses. In one incident in 1970, he declared to an audience of University of Scranton students that Richard Nixon should be "dragged out of his office and shot"; Pierce was then investigated by the Federal Bureau of Investigation, who already had an interest in him prior.

Pierce affiliated with several different movements and became prominent as an organizer and leader of the white nationalist movement. Pierce felt the NSWPP's continual display of explicit Nazi regalia hurt their recruitment, and wanted a more American variety of white supremacy. He fell out with the rest of Rockwell's successors. The "total revolution" philosophy annoyed Koehl. He, Koehl, and Lloyd led the party into the 1970s. However, he did not think Koehl was a proper leader, so he asked for Koehl to formally share power with the other two of them. This evolved into a power struggle when Koehl, offended, retaliated; Pierce lost, and ultimately left in July 1970. He wrote a letter criticizing Koehl in the aftermath, declaring he would not be surprised if the party devolved into being "a sort of Matt Koehl Nazi Fan Club".

=== National Alliance and novels ===
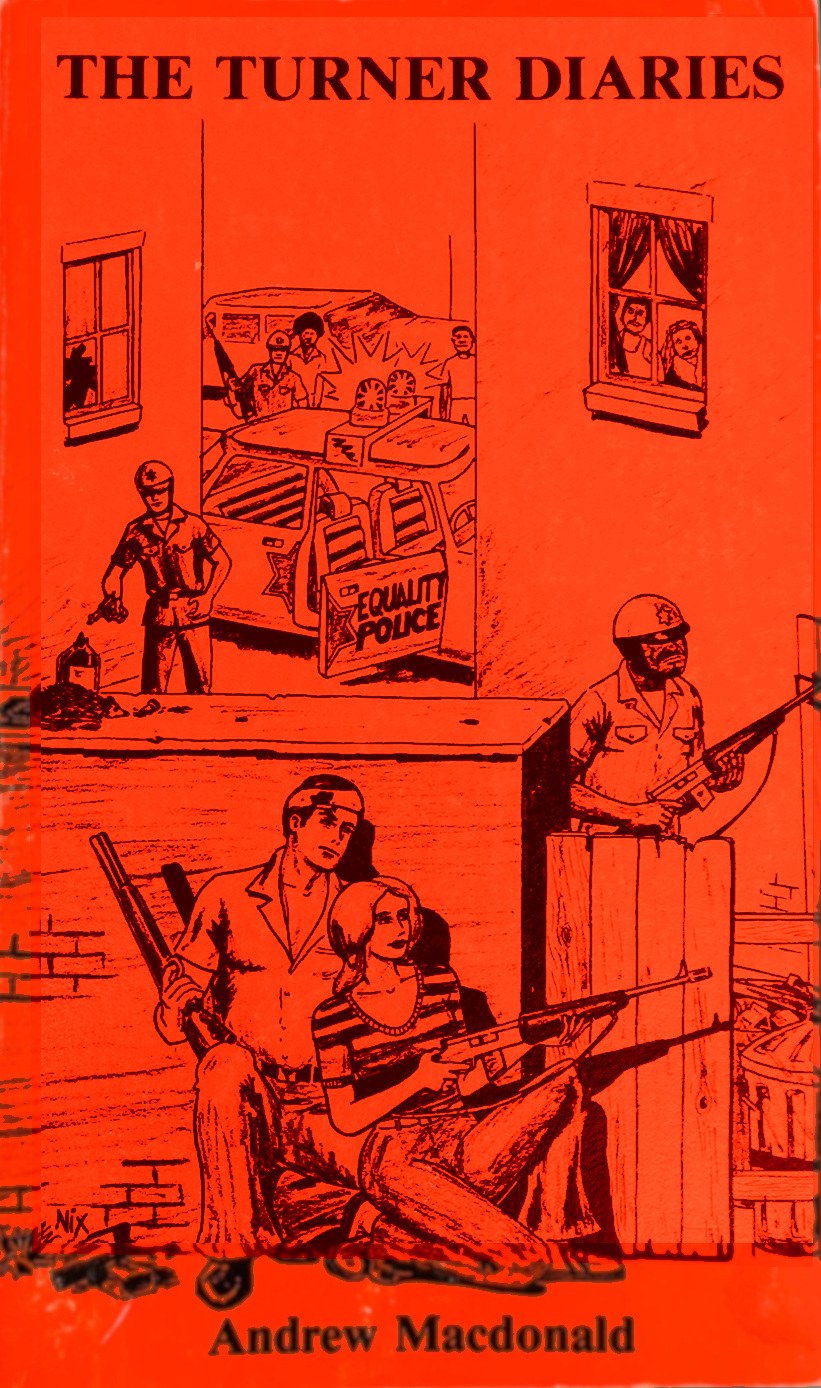
First edition cover of Pierce's The Turner Diaries, illustrated by Dennis Nix

After leaving the NSWPP, Pierce became an advisor to Willis Carto's National Youth Alliance. He created Youth for Wallace, an organization supporting the bid for the presidency of George Wallace, the former Governor of Alabama. Alongside Willis Carto, Youth for Wallace became the recruiting organization for the National Youth Alliance. The group was plagued by large amounts of infighting. Carto and Pierce had a falling out and the group split, leaving Pierce in control of the majority.

In 1974, the National Youth Alliance was restructured and renamed as the National Alliance. Pierce intended the organization to be a political vanguard that would ultimately bring about a white nationalist overthrow of the United States Federal Government. The National Alliance was the most significant neo-Nazi group to come out of the NSWPP, and also the largest. Pierce spent the rest of his life living in West Virginia.

In 1978, Pierce published The Turner Diaries under the pseudonym Andrew Macdonald, which became one of the most popular works of racist literature and sold hundreds of thousands of copies. It had started as a serial in the NA periodical Attack! in 1975. The book is a graphically violent depiction of a future race war in the United States, which includes a detailed description of the "Day of the Rope" mass hangings of many "race traitors", followed by the systematic ethnic cleansing of the city, and eventually the entire world. The story is told through the perspective of Earl Turner, an active member of the white revolutionary underground resistance, called The Organization, led by the secret inner circle known as The Order. The Turner Diaries inspired a group of white revolutionary nationalists in the early 1980s called The Order, after The Order in the novel. The Order was connected to numerous crimes, including counterfeiting, bank robbery, and murder.

Pierce divorced his wife Patricia Jones in 1982. His rationale for the split was that it was "necessary in order for me to have the peace of mind I need to do most effectively what I must do with my life". He had very little contact with either of his children from then on, despite his son's repeated attempts to contact him. In 1983, Pierce married Elizabeth Prostel, which lasted until 1985. He also had ties to British National Party leader John Tyndall.

In 1989, Pierce published another novel, Hunter, which tells the story of a man named Oscar Yeager, a veteran of the Vietnam War who begins by killing multiple interracial couples. He then assassinates liberal journalists, politicians and bureaucrats in the D.C. area. In interviews, Pierce called Hunter more realistic, and described his rationale for writing it as taking the reader through "an educational process". In 1993, he authored a comic book designed to appeal to young white supremacists, The Saga of White Will.

In 1990, West Virginia Public Broadcasting made a documentary about Pierce, entitled Dr. No? It was directed by Jacob Young. The title is a reference to how Pierce imagined his detractors portraying him.

Starting in 1991, Pierce hosted a weekly radio show, American Dissident Voices. The NA also distributed the National Vanguard periodical and maintained a website. Pierce rarely talked to the media, believing them to be dominated by Jews. While in West Virginia, the National Alliance was monitored by authorities, but mostly left to their own devices. The FBI investigated Pierce, with their file on him growing to hundreds of pages long. Unlike many white supremacist leaders of the period, Pierce was never convicted of any crime.

Pierce and The Turner Diaries gained attention following the 1995 Oklahoma City bombing by Timothy McVeigh, who was inspired by the book. McVeigh used a very similar method to the book's main character, who is placed in charge of bombing the FBI headquarters with a fertilizer truck bomb. When McVeigh was arrested later that day, pages from the book were found with him, with several phrases highlighted. Pierce's stated opinion on the bombing varied; at one time Pierce denounced the bombing as it had not been at the right time. At other times, he said he did approve of the bombing.

In 1999, Pierce bought Resistance Records, and with it, the white supremacist music magazine Resistance, from Todd Blodgett, who operated it for Carto. Pierce had supported the magazine since its inception and had written several articles for it previously. Pierce agreed to buy Carto's share of the company; he invested more money in Resistance and made Blodgett manager, tasking him to bring out the next issue. However, despite announcing a release date of June 1999, Blodgett was unable to get the issue out, angering Pierce and many skinheads. Pierce proceeded to force Blodgett out and take full control of the magazine. The magazine was issued again (with issue 9) by the now National Alliance controlled Resistance Records in October 1999.

In 2000, Pierce was profiled in a biography entitled The Fame of a Dead Man's Deeds by academic Robert S. Griffin.

Pierce's final public speech came on April 20, 2002 (Hitler's birthday). In this speech he criticized the rest of the White Power movement and other neo-Nazi groups, and promoted the cause of the National Alliance; this speech was divisive among white supremacists. This, in combination with in-group disputes and poor leadership, led to the National Alliance becoming far less significant after Pierce's death than it was under his leadership.

== Death ==
In early 2002 Pierce was diagnosed with cancer. Pierce died of kidney failure at his Hillsboro, West Virginia, compound on July 23, 2002. Shortly before his death, Pierce selected Erich Gliebe as his successor; Gliebe was the manager of Resistance Records.

In 2020, his son Kelvin coauthored Sins of My Father, which chronicled his experiences with his father, and his rejection of his views.

== Views ==
Pierce's views were centered around race, which he defined physically, culturally and spiritually; he believed that whites were the evolutionary peak of the human species and that they were being plotted against by Jews. He viewed other racial groups as not always inevitable enemies, with the exception of Jews, who he believed would inevitably conflict with white people. Pierce was frequently described as a neo-Nazi, although he personally rejected this label. When confronted with the issue by Mike Wallace on 60 Minutes, Pierce described the term as a slander, saying that though he "admire[d] many things that Hitler wrote", the National Alliance had "formulated our own program in view of the situation that we face here in America today".

Among Pierce's claimed inspirations for the development of his views were Dietrich Eckart's Bolshevism from Moses to Lenin, Friedrich Nietzsche's Thus Spoke Zarathustra, August Kubizek's The Young Hitler I Knew, and Savitri Devi's The Lightning and the Sun. From Nietzsche he was particularly taken by the idea of being a master of one's own life and the points of power of the will. In Eckart's essay he found an ideological backing for his antisemitism, while he incorporated Devi's racist mysticism from Lightning and the Sun into his ideology. Also influential on the development of his political thought were the works of American white supremacists Francis Parker Yockey, Lothrop Stoddard, and Madison Grant. He was also influenced by white nationalist writer William Gayley Simpson; Pierce published Simpson's book, Which Way Western Man? According to his son Kelvin, he had asked Pierce why he had chosen white supremacy over all else, to which Pierce responded that it "was the only responsible thing I could do".

Pierce was opposed to individualism and largely viewed politics as a manifestation of group dynamics, criticizing modern American society as atomized and selfish. He accused individualists such as Ayn Rand, who was ethnically Jewish, of plotting against whites by promoting individualism to them. Pierce's goal was to convince the white population through propaganda, leading ultimately to a violent race revolution; he promoted his views through several mediums. Particularly important to his political views was World War II, perceived by Pierce as the most important event in modern Western history. He saw it as the triumph of democracy over fascism, which he believed to be the detriment of future generations, and led to the 1960s counterculture. He believed the counterculture was a kulturkampf designed to destroy Western civilization. He found the popularity of Holocaust denialism on the far-right to be regrettable; he said he had "spoken with SS men who told me that they shot Jews, and I believed them". Instead he said that white supremacists should "face the Holocaust squarely and judge it on the basis of a higher morality, according to which it is only the upward course of Life which is sacred".

Pierce was publicly critical of most contemporary right-wing terrorism, particularly lone wolf terrorism, though not for moral reasons. He agreed ideologically with the perpetrators of most right-wing lone wolf terrorism of the period, but thought it was ineffective at best and counterproductive at worst. He accepted that "civilians are going to be killed", but said the current time was incorrect for it and it lacked "a plan that can be reasonably argued will get you what you want to achieve". Despite these statements, Pierce dedicated his second book, Hunter, to lone wolf terrorist Joseph Paul Franklin, and became associated with the strategy of leaderless resistance; he also had several followers who committed acts of lone-wolf terrorism. His approach to terrorism was, according to scholar George Michael, "a gradual approach to terrorism with a preparatory stage which emphasized propaganda and organization".

In the 1970s, Pierce created a religious philosophy he called cosmotheism. Cosmotheism synergized mystical and scientific ideas. It combined Darwinian ideas with ancient Germanic legends. The faith was atheistic and did not believe in a particular god. It emphasizes evolutionary development, and portrays the future as a linear evolutionary path related to race. In 2001, Pierce officiated the Cosmotheist wedding ceremony of Billy Roper, then a top staffer at the National Alliance. Cosmotheism was highly esoteric in its beliefs, which led to it having little influence on neo-Nazis outside of the National Alliance. It was influenced somewhat by Savitri Devi's thought.

== Bibliography ==
- Brun, E.; Hann, R.; Pierce, W.; Tanttila, W. H. (May 1, 1962). "Spin Transitions Induced by External rf Electric Field in GaAs". Physical Review Letters. 8 (9): 365–366. doi:10.1103/PhysRevLett.8.365.
- Brun, E.; Kraushaar, J. J.; Pierce, W. L.; Veigele, Wm. J. (August 15, 1962). "Nuclear Magnetic Dipole Moment of Ca 41". Physical Review Letters. 9 (4): 166–167. doi:10.1103/PhysRevLett.9.166. ISSN 0031-9007.
- Brun, E.; Mahler, R. J.; Mahon, H.; Pierce, W. L. (March 1, 1963). "Electrically Induced Nuclear Quadrupole Spin Transitions in a GaAs Single Crystal". Physical Review. 129 (5): 1965–1970. doi:10.1103/PhysRev.129.1965. ISSN 0031-899X.
- Macdonald, Andrew (1978). The Turner Diaries. Washington, D.C.: National Alliance.
- Macdonald, Andrew (1989). Hunter. Hillsboro: National Vanguard Books. ISBN 0-937944-04-1.
- Pierce, William Luther (1993). The Saga of... White Will!!. Hillsboro: National Vanguard Books.
- Devi, Savitri (2000). Pierce, William Luther (ed.). The Lightning and the Sun (Abridged ed.). Hillsboro: National Vanguard Books. ISBN 0-937944-14-9.
- Pierce, William Luther (2013). Who We Are. ISBN 978-1-291-38857-2. A collection of essays. Published posthumously after several years of delays by Pierce's successors.
