= Michele Renouf =

British political activist and Holocaust denier

Michele, Lady Renouf
- Born: Michele Suzanne Mainwaring; 1946 (age 79–80); Australia
- Education: Newcastle Technical College, National Art School, Royal Academy of Dancing, English Gardening School, Heythrop College (University of London)

Michele Suzanne Renouf (née Mainwaring; born 1946) is an Australian-born British political activist. An article in The Sunday Telegraph in February 2009 described her as a "one-time actress" and "former model and beauty queen" who since the late 1990s "has attended and spoken at Holocaust 'revisionist' conferences and written papers on the subject".

She is known for her defence of Holocaust deniers such as David Irving, Robert Faurisson, Germar Rudolf, Richard Williamson, Fredrick Töben, and Ernst Zündel in broadcasts. She has been frequently characterised in mainstream sources as a Holocaust denier. Renouf has described Judaism as a "repugnant and hateful religion."

== Early life and education ==
Born Michele Suzanne Mainwaring, in childhood she became a ballet dancer and Member of the Royal Academy of Dancing, and a model, appearing in magazine advertisements and international television commercials. In her teens she became a beauty queen, winning several titles including Miss Newcastle & Hunter Valley 1968.

In 1968, she graduated with a Diploma in Art (Education) after four years training at what was Newcastle Technical College (subsequently Newcastle University), then affiliated to the National Art School and now part of the Hunter Institute. During 1991-92, Renouf gained a diploma in Landscape Design at the English Gardening School. From 1999 to 2001, she studied for a post-graduate degree in the Psychology of Religion at Heythrop College, University of London. Renouf has worked as an actress and model.

Renouf has claimed her collegiate studies in Australia also involved summer schools at the Sydney campus of the National Art School, but the archives have no attendance records for such events. In Tehran she claimed to have been expelled from Heythrop College for her views on Judaism and officially asked to study elsewhere. A review of Renouf took the Principal's side, producing records which proved she was failed for not submitting any work for assessment.

== Personal life ==
Mainwaring's first marriage in January 1970 was to Daniel Ivan-Zadeh, a consultant psychiatrist and psychoanalyst who claimed to be a descendant of Russian nobility whose family had fled from the collapsing Russian Empire during the Bolshevik October Revolution in 1917, changing their surname on arrival in Persia. Mainwaring claimed that she had adopted his mother's family title of Countess Griaznoff (a name also spelled Griaznov or Gryaznov) only for the purposes of charity fundraising.

During the 1970s and 1980s, her charity related endeavours (which included aiding Russian refugees) regularly appeared in society publications such as Tatler and the Court Circular. At this time she was recruited to the Ladies Committee of the European-Atlantic Group but later removed in 2000 after the Group's founder, Elma Dangerfield, objected to Renouf inviting David Irving as her guest to an E-AG dinner.

Renouf claimed her first husband, Daniel Ivan-Zadeh, was from the Russian nobility. The Australian reports:

Ivan-Zadeh had always been plain "Mr" or "Doctor" but Renouf says the family had once claimed a title through his great-uncle, so she began styling herself as Countess Griaznoff "for my charity work". No such title exists in the major lists of European noble families such as the Almanach de Gotha or Burke’s Royal Families of the World.

According to Renouf, this was 'media spin' and ignored the fact that "most princely families of the Russian Empire were not included in the Gotha at all" and the Gotha is renowned for its "condescending attitude towards Eastern European nobility and royalty".

Her first marriage ended in divorce in 1990, and in 1991 she married New Zealander Francis Renouf, a merchant banker and former POW. At the time of their wedding, Sir Francis was twenty-eight years older than his forty-four year old wife.

Their matrimonial home in Eaton Square, Belgravia, was the former home of Neville Chamberlain, the UK Prime Minister from May 1937 to May 1940. Francis was the focus of media interest after losing a substantial part of his fortune and investors' money in the 1987 stockmarket crash and undergoing a dramatic divorce from his second wife in Sydney. Media interviewed her long estranged and terminally ill father Arthur Mainwaring, who had been a Korean War reconnaissance aerial photographer and continued this role for the local Port Macquarie News. Arthur Mainwaring's parents had owned a hotel by the ocean and had also been a part-time courier driver. According to The Age, the marriage dissolved after a few months following articles which portrayed Lady Renouf as from humble origins in Australia:

Their union collapsed in 1991 after only a few months, when Sir Frank reportedly discovered the then Countess Griaznoff was a truckie's daughter from The Entrance, on the NSW central coast and not a Russian noblewoman. He later described the marriage as a "nasty accident."

They separated shortly after the media ridicule surrounding the marriage, which formally ended in divorce five years later.

Renouf had claimed her father was a deceased hotelier on her marriage certificate. According to The Australian, her father, a "retired courier driver and photographer for the Port Macquarie News said he had never owned a hotel." Renouf said she believed her long-estranged and terminally ill father was dead at the time of her second marriage, and put hotelier on the certificate because among many other occupations he had been part of the family hotel at The Entrance.

== Globe Theatre Advisory Board ==
During her honeymoon in New Zealand in the early 1990s, Renouf had been invited to add stitches to a giant wool tapestry curtain which was its national contribution to the Globe Theatre reconstruction project. This led to her joining the Shakespeare's Globe's advisory board on her return to London and raising funds for the completion. Renouf and her associates sponsored the building of the Globe's Wardrobe of Robes Room. Her design for an Elizabethan Knot and Maze Garden for the reconstruction of William Shakespeare’s Globe Theatre outside the Globe was blocked by the Provost of Southwark Cathedral, Colin Slee, who objected to the possibility that his windows might be overlooked by members of the public.

== Activism ==
After providing legal support to Richard Williamson, Renouf said to The Sunday Telegraph in March 2009, "our concern is not Holocaust denial, but debate denial. People should have the freedom to question the accepted view of what happened. That questioning is part of our culture."

She has said her interest began when a Jewish member of a committee which she had convened objected to suckling pig being an option on the menu at a dinner she was organising in 1997 for the Globe restoration. The Australian traced the woman, a "retired American art gallery owner named Wylma Wayne", who denied Renouf's recollections and insisted that her objections, and those of a non-Jewish member who resigned in support, were because of Renouf's behaviour and unnecessary expenditure and had not been related to religion at all.

== Palestine ==
In January 2001 Renouf had an announcement published in the Personal Column of The Times: "On 'Holocaust' Day remember their 3.5 million Palestinian refugees." This elicited correspondence from Eric Lowe, a British veteran of the Mandatory Palestine Emergency and editor of Palestine Scrapbook. Renouf filmed interviews with Lowe and fellow veterans conducted by journalist Phillip Knightley, now archived at the Middle East Centre, St Antony's College, Oxford.

== Connections to Holocaust deniers ==
=== David Irving ===
When Renouf read a quotation from Holocaust denier David Irving in a newspaper article on Irving's libel case against the historian Deborah Lipstadt, she first became interested in the use of the term Holocaust in relation to World War II history, having had no special interest in or knowledge of the period previously.

She attended the two-month libel action Irving brought against Lipstadt and expressed interest in Irving's ideas and the reaction to them. "I found on Irving's side of the courtroom a solitary person representing himself, backed up by enormous forensic research and tremendously capable debate based on substance and fact... On the other side of the courtroom I saw 21-25 people with laptops connected it seems to the Israeli government. All they were offering was smears and insults to Irving personally". In 2001, she attempted to gain funding for David Irving from the Saudi Prince Fahd bin Salman, though the Prince died before arrangements could be made.

In the same year, she wrote a letter to the Evening Standard newspaper in London complaining of biased BBC coverage of the Irving-Lipstadt trial, signing it "Lady Renouf, Reform Club, 104 Pall Mall". This led to an unsuccessful effort to expel her from the Reform Club in September 2002, when she was defended by fellow Club member Bob Worcester. In May 2003 Renouf's critics succeeded in expelling her from the Club.

After Irving was arrested in Austria in 2005, Renouf organised financial support for his family, maintained his website and traveled with friends to Vienna to support Irving during his trial for denying the Holocaust, saying "I am here to see a freed Irving and a freed Austria from this totalitarian law" responding to Holocaust denial. Interviewed at the court, she called for "so-called Holocaust victims" to be "exhumed to see whether they died from typhoid or gas". In November 2006 though, while Irving was in prison, the leadership of the far-right British National Party, prevented her from addressing its Croydon branch on Irving's situation as "her presence would put the BNP in a bad light". The previous year, Renouf had shared a platform with Nick Griffin and David Duke in the United States.

=== Fredrick Töben ===
In October–November 2008, Renouf recruited lawyers for the Australian Fredrick Töben, of the Adelaide Institute, an organisation dedicated to challenging "the Holocaust myth", after he was arrested at London's Heathrow Airport under a European Arrest Warrant. Renouf and Töben were appointed to the "International Fact Finding Committee on the Holocaust" at the conclusion of the International Conference to Review the Global Vision of the Holocaust in Tehran in December 2006.

=== Richard Williamson ===
Within weeks Renouf became involved in the defence of British traditionalist Catholic Bishop Richard Williamson following the broadcast by Swedish television of an interview with him in which he disputed the Holocaust. Williamson's supporters arranged for Renouf to attend Heathrow Airport on 25 February 2009, with a legal defence team poised to assist Williamson with his arrival in London in case he was detained. At Heathrow, she blamed Germany, because of its laws blocking Holocaust denial, for the "scrum of Jewish protests".

== Holocaust denial and antisemitism ==
=== Conferences and trials ===
Between 2004 and 2006, Renouf spoke at numerous Holocaust denial meetings, Real History Conferences and American Free Press events in Europe, the U.S. and Canada, and attended the trials of Holocaust deniers Ernst Zündel, Germar Rudolf and Robert Faurisson.

In 2004, Renouf attended the conference of the "Holocaust revisionist" body Institute for Historical Review conference in California, at which she delivered a speech. She attended the International Conference - Holocaust Review: A Global Vision in Tehran, Iran, in December 2006, which was described by the Anti-Defamation League as a "Holocaust denial conference". In her address, the "Psychology of Holocaustianity", she described Judaism as possessing a "dangerously misanthropic tendency" and "fundamentally anti-Gentile narcissism." In 2009, Renouf attended a European Parliament-sponsored conference in Brussels, titled "Denial and Democracy in Europe," where she gave an address.

During 2007–8, she appeared in televised debates with Stephen Sizer, Norman Finkelstein, former CIA station chief George Lambrakis, and Likud strategist Dmitry Shimelfarb as well as TV broadcasts with Dr. Christian Lindtner, Yaqub Zaki, Peter Rushton, Nicholas Kollerstrom, Moeen Yaseen, Riad Al-Taher, Mohammad Saeed Bahmanpour and Press TV's Between the Headlines.

Renouf appeared at David Duke's EURO Conference in New Orleans in 2005, which included guests such as Nick Griffin and Simon Darby from the British National Party, Karl Richter from the Nationaldemokratische Partei Deutschlands, Swedish politician Vávra Suk, as well as leaders from the National Front in France and South Africa. She was also pictured on the British People's Party's website addressing their 2007 St George's Day event in Hove, having previously also spoken at a meeting in Leeds for the party.

In January 2009, she was photographed in Paris visiting the nightclub act of Dieudonné with Robert Faurisson and his family and friends on the occasion of Faurisson's 80th birthday.

In March 2009, she met former U.S. Congresswoman Cynthia McKinney in London at the "Forum on Gaza Genocide: Solution for Palestine," where the two were photographed together. McKinney was attacked by the press for associating with the far-right.

Efraim Zuroff, of the Simon Wiesenthal Centre in Jerusalem told The Australian newspaper: "This woman is especially dangerous, because she is so attractive and can put a pretty face on a very ugly movement."

Remarks she made about the Holocaust during a neo-Nazi rally in Dresden on 17 February 2018 prompted the German police to begin an incitement investigation against her. Her trial was set to begin on 6 October 2020 but two days before that all charges were dropped.

== Personal views ==
Renouf claims not to be antisemitic on the grounds that she does not regard Judaism as genetic and criticises Christian Zionism in equivalent terms ("you don't have to be Jewish to be Jew-ish"). She has described Judaism as a "repugnant and hate-filled religion." The European Jewish Congress quoted Renouf as telling the Tehran International Conference to Review the Global Vision of the Holocaust in 2006: "anti-Semitism is caused by the anti-gentile nature of Judaism".

She has a website for what she terms "an all round common sense campaign option for the first Jewish homeland" of Birobidjan.
