= Rue Voltaire =

Several cities or towns have an avenue, a boulevard, a place, a quay or a rue Voltaire:

== Belgium ==
- Avenue and place Voltaire in Brussels.

== France ==
=== Boulevards ===
- Boulevard Voltaire in Asnières-sur-Seine
- Boulevard Voltaire in Issy-les-Moulineaux
- Boulevard Voltaire in Marseille
- Boulevard Voltaire in Paris

=== Dead ends ===
- Impasse Voltaire in Paris

=== Quays ===
- Quai Voltaire in Paris.

=== Streets ===
- Rue Voltaire in Grenoble
- Rue Voltaire in La Garenne-Colombes
- Rue Voltaire in Levallois-Perret
- Rue Voltaire in Lyon
- Rue Voltaire in Nantes
- Rue Voltaire in Paris
- Rue Voltaire in Reims
- Rue Voltaire in Sceaux
- Rue Voltaire in Suresnes

== See also ==
- Voltaire (disambiguation)
