= Voltaire (disambiguation) =

Voltaire is the pen name of French Enlightenment writer, historian, and philosopher François-Marie Arouet.

Voltaire may also refer to:

== Places ==
- Voltaire, North Dakota, a city in the United States
- Voltaire (crater), an impact crater on the Martian moon Deimos
- 5676 Voltaire, an asteroid
- Cape Voltaire, a cape in the Kimberley region of Western Australia

== Ships ==
- French battleship Voltaire, a Danton-class pre-dreadnought battleship
- Voltaire, one of the names of the French ship Viala (1795), a ship of the line

== Other uses ==
- Voltaire (given name)
- Boulevard Voltaire, a boulevard in Paris
- Voltaire station, a Paris Metro station
- Voltaire (film), a 1933 biographical film starring George Arliss as the French writer and philosopher
- Voltaire (show jumping horse), an influential sire of show jumpers and dressage horses
- Le Voltaire (newspaper), a French daily newspaper established in 1878
- Voltaire (racehorse), a Thoroughbred racehorse
- Voltaire, a computer network equipment manufacturer acquired by Mellanox Technologies in 2010
- Voltaire Network, an international non-profit organization
- Aurelio Voltaire, Cuban-American musician
- Cirqus Voltaire, a pinball machine released by Williams Electronics Games in 1997

== See also ==
- Voltaire Foundation, at the University of Oxford, U.K.
- Voltaire Human Rights Awards, given by Liberty Victoria, Australia
- Voltaire Prize for Tolerance, International Understanding and Respect for Differences, given by the University of Potsdam, Germany
