= Electronic Frontiers Australia =

Australian non-governmental organization

Electronic Frontiers Australia Inc.
- Abbreviation: EFA
- Formation: May 1994; 32 years ago
- Type: NGO
- Registration no.: 101007096
- Purpose: Digital rights
- Region served: Australia
- Key people: John Pane, Chair
- Website: efa.org.au

Electronic Frontiers Australia Inc. (EFA) is an independent Australian non-profit organisation, established in 1994, that advocates for digital and consumer rights, privacy, and freedom of expression in the online environment.

The organisation participates in public policy submissions, education, and media commentary on issues including privacy legislation, online safety, encryption, data retention, and emerging technologies such as artificial intelligence.

Its main objective is to protect and promote the civil liberties of users and operators of computer-based communications systems such as the Internet.It also advocates the amendment of laws and regulations in Australia and elsewhere which restrict free speech as well educating the community at large about the social, political, and civil-liberties issues involved in the use of computer-based communications systems.

The organisation has warned against privacy invasions following the distribution of a draft code of practice for ISPs and their response to cybercrime. It has also warned against intellectual property clauses in free trade agreements between Australia and the United States.

== History ==
EFA was established on 1 January 1994, influenced at the time by the work of the Electronic Frontier Foundation (EFF) in the United States, but they are not affiliated.

The organisation was incorporated in May 1994 under the Associations Incorporation Act (S.A.) and became a registered charity with the Australian Charities and Not-For-Profits Commission in 2024.

EFA is funded by membership subscriptions and donations. It is governed by a volunteer ten member board, including a Chair, Vice Chair, Secretary, and Treasurer.

EFA is also a founding member of the Global Liberty Internet Campaign, established in 1996.

In 1999, the organisation moved against legislation aiming to filter internet pornography and other material deemed unfit for public consumption online that was pursued by politicians such as Brian Harradine.

The EFA spoke out against the rulings in relation to convicted Holocaust denier Fredrick Töben and his Adelaide Institute, taking the view that "when encountering racist or hateful speech, the best remedy to be applied is generally more speech, not enforced silence." One of the reasons mentioned is that suppressing such content results in perception that the speaker must have something important to say, and "massively increased interest in what would otherwise be marginal ideas."

== Internet Filtering (2006-2010) ==
In 2006, the EFA pushed against Cleanfeed, a mandatory ISP level content filtration system proposed by Kim Beazley. Internet filtering was later pursued by Telecommunications Minister Stephen Conroy. The EFA presented a petition against mandatory internet filtering with 19,000 signatures to the Australian Senate.

== Data retention and Privacy ==
In 2013, following the Edward Snowden disclosures on global surveillance practices, EFA joined other civil liberties organisations in calling for an inquiry into Australia’s intelligence-gathering activities, warning of a disregard for Australians’ privacy and oversight protections.

In 2014–2015, the organisation opposed federal government mandatory data retention laws and participated in public debate surrounding amendments to telecommunications interception legislation, with EFA representatives warning that the proposed scheme amounted to an “indiscriminate invasion of privacy of all Australians”.

During 2018–2019, EFA joined with other privacy organisations in publicly criticising the online medical booking platform HealthEngine after media investigations and regulatory proceedings revealed that the company shared patient data with third parties, including lawyers and insurance brokers without adequate disclosure. In a joint statement, EFA board member Justin Warren said that people expect health information to be kept secure and not widely shared, and called for stronger privacy protections.

In 2020, EFA raised concerns about the Australian Government’s draft Data Availability and Transparency Bill, which would allow greater sharing of personal data between government agencies. Board member Justin Warren suggested the government follow Australian Law Reform Commission recommendations to provide legal recourse for individuals if their data was misused.

In 2021, EFA board member Justin Warren commented to the ABC News on proposed updates to Victoria’s COVID-19 check-in app that would allow users to view their own check-in history, warning that while the feature “sounds appealing,” it could pose risks for people in abusive situations where location history might be misused by others.

In 2022, during debate over new privacy law reforms following major data breaches, EFA chair Justin Warren welcomed increased penalties for privacy breaches but cautioned that the changes did not provide compensation for individuals harmed by data misuse, and advocated for a statutory tort for serious invasions of privacy.

In 2024, EFA and other privacy organisations lodged complaints with the Office of the Australian Information Commissioner regarding the use of facial recognition technology by major Australian retailers. Following an investigation, the regulator found that the use of facial recognition technology breached privacy laws, and retailers including Bunnings were directed to cease the practice.

In the same year, EFA participated in public consultations and made submissions during the review process of the proposed Australian Federal Government’s Privacy and Other Legislation Amendment Act 2024. Following the passing of the legislation, the EFA stated that whilst it was “great to see the tort of serious privacy invasion introduced” the Act did not address all of the issues raised by privacy advocates, including concerns that mechanisms remain that allow advertisers to identify users.

== Census and Data Encryption (2016) ==
In 2016, EFA raised concerns about changes to the Australian Census that would allow personal identifying information to be retained, with the organisation warning of “seriously concerning and risky” privacy implications and joining other advocacy groups in criticising the policy.

== Robodebt (2015–2020) ==
During the controversial Australian federal government’s Robodebt scheme, Electronic Frontiers Australia publicly criticised the program and called for its review and termination. At the time, the organisation’s chair, Lyndsey Jackson, was also involved in the creation of the “Not My Debt” website, an online platform that collected accounts from individuals affected by the scheme and contributed to broader public scrutiny of its impacts.

== Online safety, age verification, and AI governance (2020–2025) ==
As part of its ongoing engagement with online safety policy, between 2020 and 2025, EFA engaged with national debates on online safety and social media regulation, submitting to inquiries on the Online Safety Amendment (Social Media Minimum Age) Bill 2024 and giving evidence before parliamentary estimates on proposed online safety codes.

In September 2025, EFA cautioned against the use of ChatGPT in government decision making. Chair John Pane commented, “Part of the fundamental problem with adopting AI to make decisions is that the law is designed for human decision-makers. If an AI tool forms part of government decision making in any way, it could expose the government to legal actions similar to the robodebt administrative law actions.” The Department of Finance was expanding its AI use in a program called GovAI which would be fully rolled out by November 2025.

In October 2025, Pane participated in an ABC News Digital Dilemma discussion on the government’s proposed under-16s social media ban, raising concerns that measures to enforce the ban could “acclimatise young people to produce digital ID online” and increase the risk of unnecessary data sharing.

The organisation also raised concerns in November 2025 about proposed age verification rules for search engines and other online services, with Chair John Pane warning that potential privacy and effectiveness issues meant the policies “may not do enough to keep children safer online”.

EFA opposed the proposed amendments and made a submission to the Senate inquiry into the Freedom of Information Amendment Bill 2025. The bill attracted criticism from media and legal stakeholders and was discharged from the Senate Notice Paper in March 2026 without being passed.

== See also ==
- Australian Classification Board
- Copyright law of Australia
- Internet Australia
- Mass surveillance in Australia
- Privacy in Australian law
