= John Tuson Bennett =

Australian Holocaust denier (1937–2013)

- Born: 12 November 1937; Horsham, Victoria
- Died: 22 July 2013 (aged 75)
- Occupation: Solicitor
- Known for: Holocaust denial

John Tuson Bennett (12 November 1937 – 22 July 2013) was a solicitor in Victoria, Australia. He was one of Australia's longest and most active Holocaust deniers, active in the Holocaust denial movement from the late 1970s. He formed the Australian Civil Liberties Union (ACLU) in 1980.

== Early life and education ==
Bennett was born on 12 November 1937 in Horsham, Victoria. His father, Ian, was a solicitor, and later served as mayor. (Note: The Herald Sun death notice says that he died aged 76, so this DOB may not be correct.)

He graduated with honours from the University of Melbourne in both law and arts.

== Career ==
Bennett worked from 1974 to 1996 for the Legal Aid Commission of Victoria.

He and Beatrice Faust established the Victorian Council for Civil Liberties (VCCL, now known as Liberty Victoria) in 1966, and Bennett served as its secretary until 1980. The new body, which superseded the Australian Council for Civil Liberties (ACCL), had no ties with former council members, and no political and religious affiliations, unlike the ACCL, which was affiliated to the Labor Party. It focused largely on police matters, in particular their actions in response to protests against the Vietnam War around 1970. Disagreements arose between conservative and radical members, and Bennett was expelled from the Labor Party in 1980.

=== Australian Civil Liberties Union ===
Around this time disagreements arose between conservative and radical members of the VCCL, and in May 1980 a new committee was elected without Bennett. Conflict ensued, with Bennett refusing to hand over control of the finances or membership list, and the matter went to court. While Bennett claimed to represent the VCCL, but in the same year formed a new body, the Australian Civil Liberties Union (ACLU), its name based on the American Civil Liberties Union, and was its president from 1980 to 2004. The ACLU has been characterised as "one of Victoria's foremost racist and Holocaust denying organisations". Geoff Muirden was secretary of the ACLU in 2004.

=== Publications and other roles ===
He was for many years the author of an annually published handbook or journal called Your Rights, This was published over a number of years and editions, first by Bennett, then by VCCL, and then ACLU. The 1984 edition included a section which denied the Holocaust. Bennett claimed in 2003 that the publication was "the most commonly used layman's guide to law in Australia", with over 500,000 copies sold or distributed for free since the first edition.

Bennett was closely associated with the Adelaide Institute as well as the United States-based Institute for Historical Review, two groups known for Holocaust denial, and was on the board of The Journal of Historical Review.

In 1999 he organised support for Holocaust denier Fredrick Töben, after he had been jailed in Mannheim.

He also criticised "multiculturalism and Asian immigration" in addition to criticism against the Jewish community and traditional beliefs about The Holocaust.

== Death and legacy ==
Bennett died on 22 July 2013, aged 76.
