= Internet Australia =

Nonprofit representing Internet users

- Formation: 1996
- Type: Non-profit organisation
- Legal status: Active
- Purpose: Promote positive Internet developments for the benefit of the whole community
- Headquarters: Sydney
- Region served: Australia
- Website: www.internet.org.au

Internet Australia (previously known as the Internet Society of Australia) is the not-for-profit peak body representing everyone who uses the Internet. It is a broad member-based organisation not an industry lobby group. Its mission statement is Helping Shape Our Internet Future. It is the Australian chapter of the global Internet Society, often referred to as ISOC.

The organisation has been in existence since 1996. Internet Australia has made submissions and appeared before a range of inquiries held by the Australian Parliament. In 2015 Internet Australia organised the creation of a group called Parliamentary Friends of the Internet designed to provide a forum for providing information and guidance to MPs and Senators.

Geoff Huston was a Founding Member of the new ASIC-registered company that was incorporated on 15 November 1996, along with Hugh Irvine (Chair), Robert Kummerfield, Kate Lance, George Michaelson, Adrian Hill and Peter Elford. The Inaugural General Meeting of the Society was held on 27 November 1996; where the Articles of Association of the Society were modified and adopted and additional Directors to a total of 12, were duly elected. In the 12 December 1996 Directors Meeting it was resolved that the Society would become a Chapter of the Internet Society (ISOC) in 2026 Internet Australia has been a Chapter of ISOC for 30 years.

== Previous Presidents of the Internet Society Chapter over the last 30 years: ==
Hugh Irvine - Inaugural Chair and Founding Member November 1996 - 1997

Geoff Huston - Board Chair from 1997 - 1998

Kate Lance - President from 1999 - 2000

Greg Watson - President from 2000 - 2001

Tony Hill - President from 2001 - 2011

Narelle Clark - President from 2011 - 2014

George Fong - President from 2014 - 2017

Paul Brooks - President from 2017 - 2024.

The organisation changed its name from Internet Society of Australia to Internet Australia. President George Fong commented at the time on the change "is designed to give the Society a more contemporary image in keeping with the board's determination to take a higher profile in fostering informed debate about Internet related issues."

In September 2017 five of the board of Directors of Internet Australia indicated they would not seek re-election to allow the entity to renew itself. Dr Books was outspoken on the previous direction of Internet Australia and the outgoing executive director Laurie Patton.

The current Internet Australia Board Chair is Cheryl Langdon-Orr who was elected in December 2024, having served in a number of executive roles on the Board since the end of 2001.

== See also ==
- Electronic Frontiers Australia
- Internet in Australia
