= Frank Renouf =

New Zealand stockbroker and financier

Sir Francis Henry Renouf (31 July 1918 – 13 September 1998) was a New Zealand stockbroker and financier.

== Early life ==
Born in Wellington on 31 July 1918, Renouf was the son of Mary Ellen Renouf (née Avery) and Francis Charles Renouf. He was educated at Wellington College and Victoria University of Wellington where he graduated Master of Commerce in 1940.

During World War II, Renouf served as a captain in the 2nd New Zealand Expeditionary Force, but was captured in Greece in April 1941, and spent four years as a prisoner of war in Germany (Biberach, Warburg, Eichstatt). On his return to New Zealand, he was awarded an Armed Services Scholarship and studied for a Diploma in Politics and Economics at Worcester College, Oxford, from 1947 to 1949.

Renouf played tennis for New Zealand Universities between 1938 and 1940, and Oxford University, gaining an Oxford Blue in tennis in 1948 and 1949.

== Business career ==
Renouf was a businessman and a stockbroker from 1950 as a partner in the Wellington stockbroking firm of Daysh, Renouf & Co (the firm was originally Daysh, Longuet and Frethey). He introduced unit trusts to New Zealand, and founded New Zealand's first merchant bank, the New Zealand United Corporation. He initiated the first NZ share index in 1957; the NZUC index and the first listed property company, Property Securities Ltd. He was the first to provide underwriting services for equity and local authority debt issues. Daysh, Renouf & Co became known as Renouf & Co in 1977. Renouf set up three companies in 1981; Frank Renouf & Co, Renouf Corporation Ltd and Renouf Properties Ltd.

== Other activities ==
Renouf was president of the New Zealand Lawn Tennis Association (1985–86). He was a supporter and follower of tennis and was a foundation member and president of the International Club of New Zealand. The Renouf Tennis Centre in Wellington is named after him. Renouf supported many Wellington cultural and sporting projects; the Michael Fowler Centre (1975), Downstage Theatre (1977), Wellington Cathedral (1978), the Renouf Sports Centre at Wellington College (1983) and the Renouf Tennis Centre (1986).

In the 1987 New Year Honours, Renouf was appointed a Knight Bachelor, for philanthropic services. In 1997, he was inducted into the New Zealand Business Hall of Fame.

== Marriages ==
Renouf was married three times. In 1954, he married Ann Narie Harkin, and the couple had four children before divorcing in 1985. He wed his second wife, Susan Renouf (born Susan Rossiter; also known as Susan Peacock and Susan Sangster), in 1985 and they divorced four years later. His third wife (1991) was Michèle Suzanne Mainwaring, to whom he was briefly married.

== Death ==
Sir Francis Renouf died in Wellington, New Zealand in 1998, aged 80.

== Sources ==
- Obituary in Dominion (Wellington) of 14 September 1998 (pages 1,11).
- Sir Francis Renouf: an autobiography (1997, Steele Roberts, Wellington) ISBN 0-9583712-0-2
- Behind the Mirror Glass by Bruce Jesson (1987, Penguin)
