= Legality of Holocaust denial =

World map highlighting countries with legislation criminalising Holocaust denial as of 2026 Countries where Holocaust denial is illegal Countries where Holocaust denial is illegal when threatening or inciting hatred, discrimination, or violence, or where legality is ambiguous

Since World War II, several countries have criminalised Holocaust denial—the assertion that the genocide was fabricated or has been exaggerated. Currently, 18 European countries, (Note: Austria; Belgium; Czech Republic; France; Germany; Hungary; Italy; Liechtenstein; Lithuania; Luxembourg; Netherlands; Poland; Romania; Russia; Slovakia; Sweden; Switzerland; Ukraine) along with Canada and Israel, have laws in place that cover Holocaust denial as a punishable offence. Many countries also have broader laws that criminalise genocide denial as a whole, including that of the Holocaust. Among the countries that have banned Holocaust denial, Austria, Germany, Hungary, Poland, Romania and Russia have also banned Nazi symbols. Additionally, any expression of genocide justification is also a criminal offence in several countries, as is any attempt to portray Nazism in a positive light.

Legislation against Holocaust denial has been proposed in many countries that do not have it in place, including the United Kingdom and the United States. However, the proposal and implementation of these laws has been criticised and met with opposition, including from a variety of civil/human rights activists, who contend that the outlawing of these acts would violate people's established rights for freedom of speech. Organisations representing the groups that were victimised during the Holocaust have generally been split in their opinions about anti-Nazi legislation, including that which deals with the legality of Holocaust denial.

Some courts in Germany, the United Kingdom and the United States have taken judicial notice that the Holocaust occurred during World War II.

== Criticism and commentary ==
Scholars have pointed out that countries that specifically ban Holocaust denial generally have legal systems that limit speech in other ways, such as banning hate speech. According to D. D. Guttenplan, this is a split between the "common law countries of the United States, Ireland and many British Commonwealth countries from the civil law countries of continental Europe and Scotland. In civil law countries the law is generally more proscriptive. Also, under the civil law regime, the judge acts more as an inquisitor, gathering and presenting evidence as well as interpreting it". Michael Whine argues that Holocaust denial can inspire violence against Jews; he states, "Jews' experience in the post-World War II era suggests that their rights are best protected in open and tolerant democracies that actively prosecute all forms of racial and religious hatred".

János Kis and in particular András Schiffer feel the work of Holocaust deniers should be protected by a universal right to free speech. An identical argument was used by the Hungarian Constitutional Court (Alkotmánybíróság) led by László Sólyom when it struck down a law against Holocaust denial in 1992. The argument that laws punishing Holocaust denial are incompatible with the European Convention on Human Rights and the Universal Declaration of Human Rights has been rejected by institutions of the Council of Europe (the European Commission of Human Rights, the European Court of Human Rights) and also by the United Nations Human Rights Committee.

Historians who oppose such laws include Raul Hilberg, Richard J. Evans, Pierre Vidal-Naquet, and Timothy Garton Ash. Other prominent opponents include Christopher Hitchens, Peter Singer, and Noam Chomsky who wrote:

It seems to me something of a scandal that it is even necessary to debate these issues two centuries after Voltaire defended the right of free expression for views he detested. It is a poor service to the memory of the victims of the holocaust to adopt a central doctrine of their murderers.

An uproar resulted when Serge Thion used one of Chomsky's essays without explicit permission as a foreword to a book of Holocaust denial essays (see Faurisson affair).

In January 2019, in an interview in The New Yorker in connection with the publication of her book, Antisemitism: Here and Now, Holocaust historian Deborah E. Lipstadt expressed her opposition to laws against expressing Holocaust denial:

I still am a firm opponent of laws against Holocaust denial. First of all, I'm a pretty fierce advocate of the First Amendment. Having been sued for libel, and having had that in my life for about six years, I'm more than ever. Even though libel is not covered by the First Amendment, [David Irving] wouldn't have been able to sue me in this country because he was a public figure.

But I also don't think that these laws are efficacious. Forget the morality – I don't think they work. I think they turn whatever is being outlawed into forbidden fruit. We saw it in Germany, when Mein Kampf was released from the embargo on it a few years ago. People bought it because suddenly it was something they could get ahold of. I just don't think these laws work. And the third reason I'm opposed to them is I don't want politicians making a decision on what can and cannot be said. That scares me enormously.

These laws have also been criticized on the grounds that education is more effective than legislation at combating Holocaust denial and that the laws will make martyrs out of those imprisoned for their violation.

== Summary table ==
Country	Legality of Holocaust denial
Australia	Ambiguous
Austria	Illegal
Belgium	Illegal
Bosnia and Herzegovina	Illegal when inciting hatred or violence
Bulgaria	Illegal when inciting hatred or violence
Canada	Illegal
Czech Republic	Illegal
Denmark	Legal
Estonia	Legal
Finland	Illegal when inciting hatred or violence
France	Illegal
Greece	Illegal when inciting hatred or violence
Germany	Illegal
Hungary	Illegal
Iceland	Legal
Israel	Illegal
Italy	Illegal
Japan	Legal
Latvia	Illegal
Liechtenstein	Illegal
Lithuania	Illegal
Luxembourg	Illegal
Montenegro	Illegal when inciting hatred or violence
Netherlands	Illegal
Portugal	Illegal when inciting discrimination
Poland	Illegal
Romania	Illegal
Russia	Illegal
Serbia	Legal
Slovakia	Illegal
Spain	Legal
Sweden	Illegal
Switzerland	Illegal
Ukraine	Illegal
United Kingdom	Legal
United States	Legal

== By country ==
=== Australia ===
While Australia lacks a specific law against Holocaust denial, Holocaust denial is prosecuted in Australia under various laws against "hate speech" and "racial vilification". Fredrick Töben was found guilty at Australia's Federal Court of contempt in 2009 for not following a court order in 2002 to desist from publishing anti-semitic material on his Adelaide Institute website. The material queried whether the Holocaust happened, as well as the presence of gas chambers at the Auschwitz death camps.

=== Austria ===
In Austria, the Verbotsgesetz 1947 provided the legal framework for the process of denazification in Austria and suppression of any potential revival of Nazism. In 1992, it was amended to prohibit the denial or gross minimisation of the Holocaust. The most recent amendment to §3h, which came into effect on January 1st, 2024, has a base sentence range of 6 months to 5 years of imprisonment. In cases where such statements or language are spread through media or to a significant audience, this range increases to 1 to 10 years of imprisonment. In the most extreme cases involving dangerous acts, the range is imprisonment of 10 to 20 years.

National Socialism Prohibition Law (1947, amendments of 1992)

§ 3g. He who operates in a manner characterized other than that in § § 3a – 3f will be punished (revitalising of the NSDAP or identification with), with imprisonment from one to up to ten years, and in cases of particularly dangerous suspects or activity, be punished with up to twenty years' imprisonment.

§ 3h. As an amendment to § 3 g., whoever denies, grossly plays down, approves or tries to excuse the National Socialist genocide or other National Socialist crimes against humanity in a print publication, in broadcast or other media.

=== Belgium ===
In Belgium, Holocaust denial was made illegal in 1995.

Negationism Law (1995, amendments of 1999)

Article 1 Whoever, in the circumstances given in article 444 of the Penal Code denies, grossly minimises, attempts to justify, or approves the genocide committed by the German National Socialist Regime during the Second World War shall be punished by a prison sentence of eight days to one year, and by a fine of twenty six francs to five thousand francs. For the application of the previous paragraph, the term genocide is meant in the sense of article 2 of the International Treaty of 9 December 1948 on preventing and combating genocide. In the event of repetitions, the guilty party may in addition have his civic rights suspended in accordance with article 33 of the Penal Code.

Art.2 In the event of a conviction on account of a violation under this Act, it may be ordered that the judgement, in its entity or an excerpt of it, is published in one of more newspapers, and is displayed, to the charge of the guilty party.

Art.3. Chapter VII of the First Book of the Penal Code and Article 85 of the same Code are also applicable to this Act.

Art. 4. The Centre for Equal Opportunities and Opposition to Racism, as well as any association that at the time of the facts had a legal personality for at least five years, and which, on the grounds of its statutes, has the objective of defending moral interests and the honour of the resistance or the deported, may act in law in all legal disputes arising from the application of this Act.

=== Bosnia and Herzegovina ===
In May 2007 Ekrem Ajanovic, a Bosniak MP in the Bosnian Parliament proposed legislation criminalizing the denial of the Holocaust, genocide and crimes against humanity, the first time a lawmaker in Bosnia and Herzegovina had made such a suggestion. Bosnian Serb MPs voted against it, proposing the issue should be resolved within the criminal code of Bosnia and Herzegovina. Following this, on 6 May 2009 Bosniak MPs Adem Huskic, Ekrem Ajanovic and Remzija Kadric proposed to parliament a change to the Criminal Code of Bosnia and Herzegovina where Holocaust, genocide and crimes against humanity denial would be criminalized. Bosnian Serb MPs have repeatedly been opposed to such legislation claiming that the law "would cause disagreement and even animosity" according to SNSD member Lazar Prodanovic.

On 23 July 2021, the High Representative of Bosnia and Herzegovina Valentin Inzko passed a law using the Bonn Powers given to him banning the denial of genocides, crimes against humanity and war crimes.

=== Brazil ===
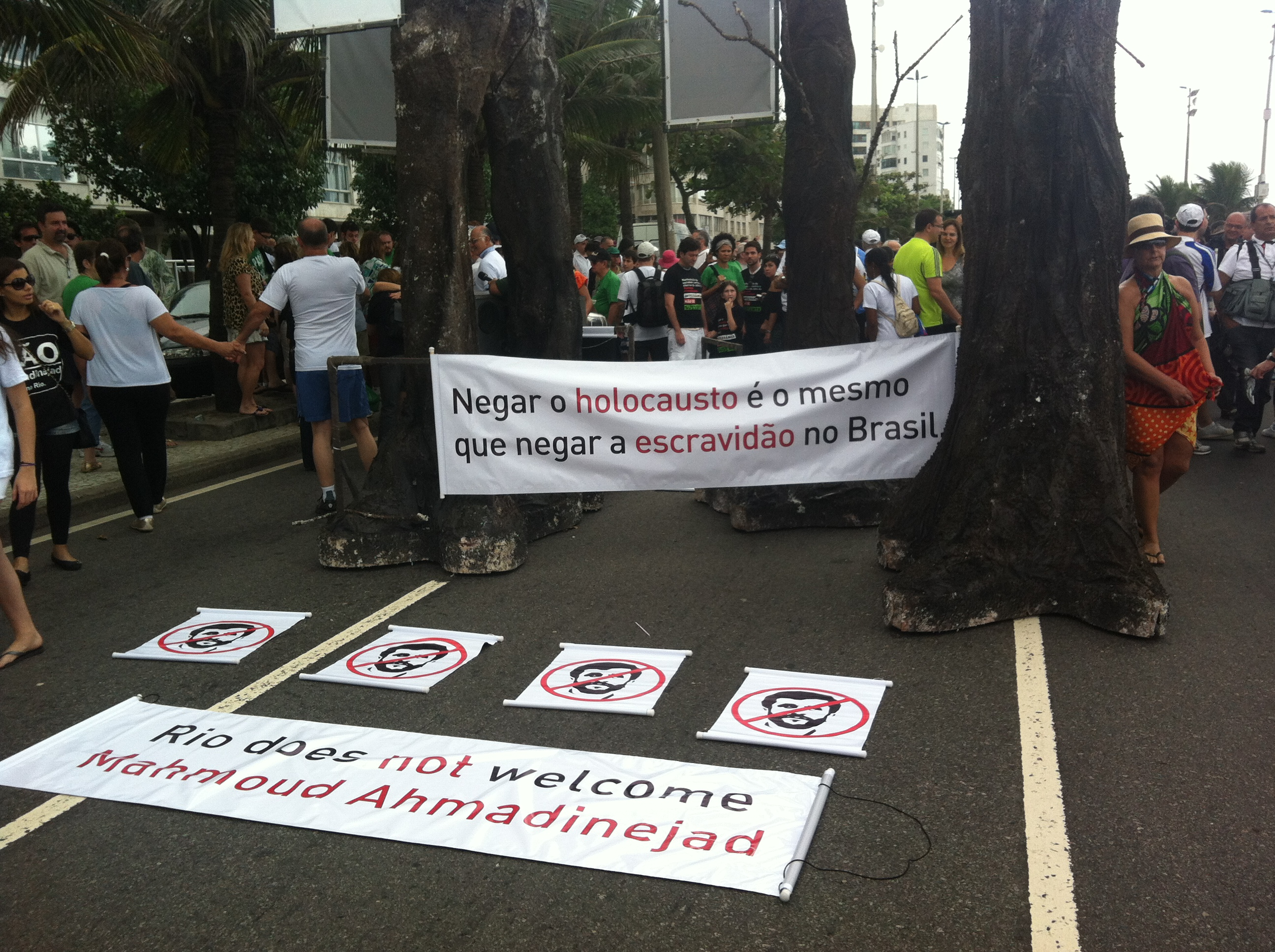
Demonstrators protest the presence of former Iranian President Mahmoud Ahmadinejad, who had referred to the Holocaust as a myth, at Rio+20 in June 2012. One banner reads: "Denying the holocaust is the same as denying slavery in Brazil".

While Holocaust denial is not explicitly prohibited in Brazilian law, precedents tend to lead to conviction. As of 11 February 2022, several bills criminalizing the act were pending in the Brazilian National Congress.

=== Bulgaria ===
In 2011, the Bulgarian Parliament passed an amendment to the Bulgarian Criminal Code, introducing article 419a.

Criminal Code of the Republic of Bulgaria (1968, amendment of 2011)

419a New, SG No. 33/2011, effective 27.05.2011) (1) Anyone who justifies, denies or grossly palliates a crime committed against peace and humanity and thereby poses a risk of violence or instigates hatred among individuals or groups of people united on the grounds of race, colour, religion, origin, national or ethic origin shall be punishable by imprisonment from one to five years.

(2) Anyone who abet another person to commit a crime under Paragraph 1 shall be punishable by imprisonment of up to one year.

=== Canada ===
The legality of Holocaust denial in Canada has come up in several court cases. In R v Zundel, the Supreme Court of Canada ruled that Ernst Zündel, a German-born immigrant, who was a prolific Holocaust denier, could not be convicted for "spreading of false news", as it would be against Canada's Charter guarantee of free expression.

According to The Canadian Press, the federal government announced a bill in 2022 that will change the Criminal Code to outlaw Holocaust denial and similar forms of antisemitic hate speech.

As of 23 June 2022, the willful promotion of antisemitism is illegal in Canada. Persons found guilty of wilfully promoting antisemitism by "condoning, denying or downplaying the Holocaust", other than in private conversation, may receive a prison sentence not more than 2 years or a summary conviction.

=== Czech Republic ===
In the Czech Republic, Holocaust denial and denial of communist-perpetrated atrocities is illegal, as well as denial of other genocides.

§ 405 Anyone who publicly denies, disputes, approves or attempts to justify a Nazi, Communist or other genocide or Nazi, Communist or other crimes against humanity or war crimes or crimes against peace will be punished by imprisonment for six months to three years.

— Criminal Code (40/2009 Sb.)

=== Finland ===
Chapter 11 of the Criminal Code of Finland prohibits denying a genocide in a manner likely to incite violence or hatred, with a penalty of up to imprisonment for two years. The law came into effect on 26 January 2026.

=== France ===
In France, the Gayssot Act, voted for on 13 July 1990, makes it illegal to question the existence of crimes that fall in the category of crimes against humanity as defined in the London Charter of 1945, on the basis of which Nazi leaders were convicted by the International Military Tribunal at Nuremberg in 1945–46. When the act was challenged by Robert Faurisson, the Human Rights Committee upheld it as a necessary means to counter possible antisemitism. Similarly, the applications of Pierre Marais and Roger Garaudy were rejected by the European Court of Human Rights, in 1996 and 2003.

In 2012, the Constitutional Council of France ruled that to extend the Gayssot Act to the Armenian genocide denial was unconstitutional because it violated the freedom of speech. The Gayssot Act itself, however, was found consistent with the Constitution four years later.

LAW No 90-615 to repress acts of racism, anti-semitism and xenophobia (1990)

MODIFICATIONS OF THE LAW OF JULY 29, 1881 ON THE FREEDOM OF THE PRESS Art 8. – Article 24 of the Law on the Freedom of the Press of 29 July 1881 is supplemented by the following provisions: In the event of judgment for one of the facts envisaged by the preceding subparagraph, the court will be able moreover to order: Except when the responsibility for the author of the infringement is retained on the base for article 42 and the first subparagraph for article 43 for this law or the first three subparagraphs for article 93-3 for the law No 82-652 for July 29, 1982 on the audio-visual communication, the deprivation of the rights enumerated to the 2o and 3o of article 42 of the penal code for imprisonment of five years maximum;

Art 9. – As an amendment to Article 24 of the law of July 29, 1881 on the freedom of the press, article 24 (a) is written as follows:

Art. 24 (a). – […] those who have disputed the existence of one or more crimes against humanity such as they are defined by Article 6 of the statute of the international tribunal military annexed in the agreement of London of August 8, 1945 and which were carried out either by the members of an organization declared criminal pursuant to Article 9 of the aforementioned statute, or by a person found guilty such crimes by a French or international jurisdiction shall be punished by one month to one year's imprisonment or a fine.

Art 13. – It is inserted, after article 48-1 of the law of 29 July 1881 on the freedom of the press, article 48-2 thus written:

Art. 48-2. – […] publication or publicly expressed opinion encouraging those to whom it is addressed to pass a favourable moral judgment on one or more crimes against humanity and tending to justify these crimes (including collaboration) or vindicate their perpetrators shall be punished by one to five years' imprisonment or a fine.

=== Germany ===
==== § 130 Incitement to hatred ====
In Germany, Volksverhetzung ('incitement to hatred') is a concept in German criminal law that bans incitement to hatred against segments of the population. It often applies to (though not limited to) trials relating to Holocaust denial in Germany. In addition, Strafgesetzbuch § 86a outlaws various symbols of "unconstitutional organisations", such as Nazi symbolism or the ISIL flag.

§ 130 Incitement to hatred (1985, Revised 1992, 2002, 2005, 2015)

(1) Whosoever, in a manner capable of disturbing the public peace:

1. incites hatred against a national, racial, religious group or a group defined by their ethnic origins, against segments of the population or individuals because of their belonging to one of the aforementioned groups or segments of the population or calls for violent or arbitrary measures against them; or
2. assaults the human dignity of others by insulting, maliciously maligning an aforementioned group, segments of the population or individuals because of their belonging to one of the aforementioned groups or segments of the population, or defaming segments of the population,

shall be liable to imprisonment from three months to five years.

[…]

(3) Whosoever publicly or in a meeting approves of, denies or downplays an act committed under the rule of National Socialism of the kind indicated in section 6 (1) of the Code of International Criminal Law, in a manner capable of disturbing the public peace shall be liable to imprisonment not exceeding five years or a fine.

(4) Whoever publicly or in a meeting disturbs the public peace in a manner which violates the dignity of the victims by approving of, glorifying or justifying National Socialist tyranny and arbitrary rule incurs a penalty of imprisonment for a term not exceeding three years or a fine.

The definition of section 6 of the Code of Crimes against International Law referenced in the above § 130 is as follows:

§ 6 Genocide

(1) Whoever with the intent of destroying as such, in whole or in part, a national, racial, religious or ethnic group:

1. kills a member of the group,
2. causes serious bodily or mental harm to a member of the group, especially of the kind referred to in section 226 of the Criminal Code,
3. inflicts on the group conditions of life calculated to bring about their physical destruction in whole or in part,
4. imposes measures intended to prevent births within the group,
5. forcibly transfers a child of the group to another group, shall be punished with imprisonment for life. […]

==== Other sections ====
The following sections of the German criminal code are also relevant:

§ 189 Disparagement of the Memory of Deceased Persons (1985, amendments of 1992)
Whoever disparages the memory of a deceased person shall be punished with imprisonment for not more than two years or a fine.

§ 194 Application for Criminal Prosecution

(1) An insult shall be prosecuted only upon complaint. If the act was committed through dissemination of writings (Section 11 subsection (3)) or making them publicly accessible in a meeting or through a presentation by radio, then a complaint is not required if the aggrieved party was persecuted as a member of a group under the National Socialist or another rule by force and decree, this group is a part of the population and the insult is connected with this persecution. The act may not, however, be prosecuted ex officio if the aggrieved party objects. When the aggrieved party deceases, the rights of complaint and of objection devolve on the relatives indicated in Section 77 subsection (2). The objection may not be withdrawn.

(2) If the memory of a deceased person has been disparaged, then the relatives indicated in Section 77 subsection (2), are entitled to file a complaint. If the act was committed through dissemination of writings (Section 11 subsection (3)) or making them publicly accessible in a meeting or through a presentation by radio, then a complaint is not required if the deceased person lost his life as a victim of the National Socialist or another rule by force and decree and the disparagement is connected therewith. The act may not, however, be prosecuted ex officio if a person entitled to file a complaint objects. The objection may not be withdrawn. […]

==== Judicial notice ====
The German Federal Supreme Court has, in at least one case, taken judicial notice that the Holocaust occurred.

=== Greece ===
In September 2014, with a vote of 54 out of 99 present of the 300-member Hellenic Parliament (the body was in summer session at the time), Greece amended its 1979 law 'On the penalization of actions or activities intending unto racial discrimination' (N.927/1979) to make malicious denial of the Holocaust and other crimes against humanity for the purposes of inciting violence, discrimination or hatred or by way of threat or insult, a criminal offense. In contrast to other European countries, the Greek law is not a blanket ban on expressing the opinion that a genocide did not take place, but rather requires an additional condition of intending to cause violence, incite hatred or threaten or insult a protected group.

LAW 927/1979 (as amended by Law 4285/2014)

Article 1 – Public incitement of violence or hatred

1. Whoever intentionally, publicly, verbally or in print, over the internet or through any other medium or means, incites, causes, arouses or solicits acts or activities which are capable of causing discrimination, hatred or violence against a person or group of persons, who are identified on the basis of race, colour, religion, genealogical background, national or ethnic origins, sexual orientation, gender identity or disability, in a way that endangers public order or poses a threat to the life, liberty or bodily integrity of such persons, shall be imprisoned for between three months and (3) years and fined between five and twenty thousand (5.000 - 20.000) euros.

[…]

Article 2 – Public approval or denial or crimes

1. Whoever intentionally, publicly, verbally or in print, over the internet or through any other medium or means, approves, ridicules or maliciously denies the existence or seriousness of crimes of genocide, war crimes, crimes against humanity, the Holocaust and other crimes of Nazism which have been recognised by decisions of international courts or the Hellenic Parliament and this behaviour is targeted against a group of people, or member thereof, which is identified on the basis of race, colour, religion, genealogical background, national or ethnic origins, sexual orientation, gender identity or disability, when this behaviour is expressed in a way that is capable of inciting violence or hatred or is of a threatening or insulting character against such a group or a member thereof, is subject to the penalties of paragraph 1 of the previous article.

This law was harshly criticised at the time of its passage for its vague language and alleged infringement of freedom of expression. In a letter signed by 139 Greek historians, they argued that "as international experience has shown, such provisions lead down dangerous paths: they critically wound the democratic and inalienable right to freedom of speech, while simultaneously not being at all effective in terms of fighting racism and Nazism. Indeed, they often lead to the opposite result, allowing the enemies of democracy to present themselves to public opinion as "victims" of censorship and authoritarianism. The conditions set forth in the bill, being highly vague and fluid, are unfortunately not a guarantee."

The first prosecution under Article 2 of the law was brought against German historian Heinz A. Richter, who was tried in absentia for denying Nazi atrocities in Crete during World War II. The court found Richter not guilty on the grounds that, while his work was proven to contain historical inaccuracies, there was no evidence he intended to incite hatred against the people of Crete and that the 2014 law was unconstitutional, as it violated the principle of freedom of speech. Though the finding of unconstitutionality is not finally binding, as it was issued by a court of first instance, as of March 2018, no one has been successfully convicted in Greece for genocide denial under this law.

=== Hungary ===
The National Assembly of Hungary declared the denial or trivialization of the Holocaust a crime punishable by up to three years' imprisonment on 23 February 2010. The law was signed by President László Sólyom in March 2010. On 8 June 2010, the newly elected Fidesz-dominated parliament changed the formulation of the law to "punish those, who deny the genocides committed by national socialist or communist systems, or deny other facts of deeds against humanity".

In 2011, the first man was charged with Holocaust denial in Budapest. The Court sentenced the man to 18 months in prison, suspended for three years, and probation. He also had to visit either Budapest's memorial museum, Auschwitz or Yad Vashem in Jerusalem. He chose his local Holocaust Memorial Center and had to make three visits in total and record his observations.

In January 2015, the court ordered far-right on-line newspaper Kuruc.info to delete its article denying the Holocaust published in July 2013, which was the first ruling in Hungary of its kind. The Association for Civil Liberties (TASZ) offered free legal aid to the website as a protest against restrictions on freedom of speech, but the site refused citing the liberal views of the association, and also refused to delete the article.

=== Israel ===
In Israel, a law to criminalize Holocaust denial was passed by the Knesset on 8 July 1986.

Denial of Holocaust (Prohibition) Law, 5746-1986

Definitions 1. In this Law, "crime against the Jewish people" and "crime against humanity" have the same respective meanings as in the "Nazis and Nazi Collaborators Law", 5710-1950.

Prohibition of Denial of Holocaust 2. A person who, in writing or by word of mouth, publishes any statement denying or diminishing the proportions of acts committed in the period of the Nazi regime, which are crimes against the Jewish people or crimes against humanity, with intent to defend the perpetrators of those acts or to express sympathy or identification with them, shall be liable to imprisonment for a term of five years.

Prohibition of publication of expression for sympathy for Nazi crimes 3. A person who, in writing or by word of mouth, publishes any statement expressing praise or sympathy for or identification with acts done in the period of the Nazi regime, which are crimes against the Jewish people or crimes against humanity, shall be liable to imprisonment for a term of five years.

Permitted publication 4. The publication of a correct and fair report of a publication prohibited by this Law shall not be regarded as an offence thereunder so long as it is not made with intent to express sympathy or identification with the perpetrators of crimes against the Jewish people or against humanity.

Filing of charge 5. An indictment for offences under this Law shall only be filed by or with the consent of the Attorney-General.

=== Italy ===
The Italian parliament, extending an anti-racism law from 1975, approved Law 16 June 2016 n. 115, criminalizing the spreading of Holocaust denial and making conviction for the crime subject to imprisonment for two to six years.

=== Liechtenstein ===
Although not specifically outlining national socialist crimes, item five of section 283 of Liechtenstein's criminal code prohibits the denial of genocide.

§ 283 Race discrimination Whoever publicly denies, coarsely trivialises, or tries to justify genocide or other crimes against humanity via word, writing, pictures, electronically transmitted signs, gestures, violent acts or by other means shall be punished with imprisonment for up to two years.

=== Lithuania ===
In Lithuania, approval and denial of Nazi or Soviet crimes is prohibited.

170(2) Publicly condoning international crimes, crimes of the USSR or Nazi Germany against the Republic of Lithuania and her inhabitants, denial or belittling of such crimes.

=== Luxembourg ===
In Luxembourg, Article 457-3 of the Criminal Code, Act of 19 July 1997 outlaws Holocaust denial and denial of other genocides. The punishment is imprisonment for between eight days to six months or a fine. The offence of "negationism and revisionism" applies to:

...anyone who has contested, minimised, justified or denied the existence of war crimes or crimes against humanity as defined in the statutes of the International Military Tribunal of 8 August 1945 or the existence of a genocide as defined by the Act of 8 August 1985. A complaint must be lodged by the person against whom the offence was committed (victim or association) in order for proceedings to be brought, Article 450 of the Criminal Code, Act of 19 July 1997.

=== Montenegro ===
Article 370 of the Montenegro Penal Code prohibits denying or downplaying genocide in a manner that could incite violence or hatred towards a person or a group.

=== Netherlands ===
While Holocaust denial was not explicitly illegal in the Netherlands, courts could interpret it as a form of spreading hatred and therefore an offence, depending on the context in which the statements were made. According to the Dutch public prosecution office, offensive remarks are only punishable by Dutch law if they equate to discrimination against a particular group. The relevant laws of the Dutch penal code are as follows:

Article 137c

1. He who in public, either verbally or in writing or image, deliberately offends a group of people because of their race, their religion or beliefs, their hetero- or homosexual orientation or their physical, psychological or mental handicap, shall be punished with imprisonment not exceeding one year or a fine of the third category. [...]

Article 137d

1. He who in public, either verbally or in writing or image, incites hatred or discrimination against people or incites acts of violence towards people or property of people because of their race, their religion or beliefs, their gender, their hetero- or homosexual orientation or their physical, psychological or mental handicap, shall be punished with imprisonment not exceeding one year or a fine of the third category. [...]

On 14 July 2023, as on the proposal of the Dutch Minister of Justice and Security, Yeşilgöz-Zegerius, it was decided that the above-mentioned laws would be extended to prohibit insulting forms of condoning, denying or trivializing the Holocaust. This is to specifically protect victims and survivors of genocide and other war crimes from particularly hurtful statements that deny and trivialize these types of international crimes. In violating the extension, a punishment of a maximum one year imprisonment will apply. The ban is part of the Bill to Re-implement European Criminal Law.

This took effect on the first of October 2024. As a result, article 137c of the penal code has been amended to include, after paragraph 1:

2 The same punishment shall be imposed on a person who intentionally makes an insult to a group of people as described in the first paragraph in public, or by writing or by image:

a. by condoning one of the acts as defined in Articles 3 to 6, 7, paragraph 2, and 8 to 8b of the International Crimes Act or one of the facts as defined in Article 6 of the Charter of the International Military Court, attached to the London Convention of 8 August 1945;

b. by denying or far-reaching trivialising any of the facts as described in the articles referred to in (a), insofar as that fact has been established by an irrevocable decision by an international court that derives its jurisdiction from a treaty to which the Kingdom is a party or by the Dutch court.

— Article 137c, paragraph 2, Criminal code of the Netherlands.

=== Poland ===
In Poland, Holocaust denial and the denial of communist crimes is punishable by law.

Act of 18 December 1998 on the Institute of National Remembrance – Commission for the Prosecution of Crimes against the Polish Nation (Dz.U. 1998 nr 155 poz. 1016)

Article 55
He who publicly and contrary to facts contradicts the crimes mentioned in Article 1, clause 1 shall be subject to a fine or a penalty of deprivation of liberty of up to three years. The judgment shall be made publicly known.

Article 1
This Act shall govern:
1. the registration, collection, access, management and use of the documents of the organs of state security created and collected between 22 July 1944 and 31 December 1989, and the documents of the organs of security of the Third Reich and the Union of Soviet Socialist Republics concerning:

a) crimes perpetrated against persons of Polish nationality and Polish citizens of other ethnicity, nationalities in the period between 1 September 1939 and 31 December 1989:

- Nazi crimes,
- communist crimes,
- other crimes constituting crimes against peace, crimes against humanity or war crimes

b) other politically motivated repressive measures committed by functionaries of Polish prosecution bodies or the judiciary or persons acting upon their orders, and disclosed in the content of the rulings given pursuant to the Act of 23 February 1991 on the Acknowledgement as Null and Void Decisions Delivered on Persons Repressed for Activities for the Benefit of the Independent Polish State (Journal of Laws of 1993 No. 34, item 149, of 1995 No. 36, item 159, No. 28, item 143, and of 1998 No. 97, item 604),

2. the rules of procedure as regards the prosecution of crimes specified in point 1 letter a),
3. the protection of the personal data of grieved parties, and

4. the conduct of activities as regards public education.

=== Portugal ===
Although denial of the Holocaust is not expressly illegal in Portugal, Portuguese law prohibits denial of war crimes if used to incite to discrimination.

Article 240: Racial, religious, or sexual discrimination

[…]

2 — Whoever in a public meeting, in writing intended for dissemination, or by any means of mass media or computer system whose purpose is to disseminate:

[…]

b) defames or slanders an individual or group of individuals because of race, colour, ethnic or national origin, or religion, particularly through the denial of war crimes or those against peace and humanity;

[…]

with intent to incite to racial, religious or sexual discrimination or to encourage it, shall be punished with imprisonment from six months to five years.

=== Romania ===
In Romania, Emergency Ordinance No. 31 March 13, 2002 prohibits Holocaust denial. It was ratified on 6 May 2006. The law also prohibits racist, fascist, xenophobic symbols, uniforms and gestures: proliferation of which is punishable with imprisonment from between six months to five years.

Emergency Ordinance No. 31 of March 13, 2002

[...]

Article 3. – (1) Establishing a fascist, racist or xenophobic organisation is punishable by imprisonment from 5 to 15 years and the loss of certain rights.

[...]

Article 4. – (1) The dissemination, sale or manufacture of symbols either fascist, racist or xenophobic, and possession of such symbols is punished with imprisonment from 6 months to 5 years and the loss of certain rights.

[...]

Article 5. – Promoting the culture of persons guilty of committing a crime against peace and humanity or promoting fascist, racist or xenophobic ideology, through propaganda, committed by any means, in public, is punishable by imprisonment from 6 months to 5 years and the loss of certain rights.

Article 6. – Denial of the Holocaust in public, or to the effects thereof is punishable by imprisonment from 6 months to 5 years and the loss of certain rights.

In 2021, the first sentence over Holocaust denial was made in Romania. The accused was Vasile Zărnescu, a former Romanian Intelligence Service (SRI) member who published several articles and a book against the veracity of the Holocaust. Zărnescu was sentenced to one year and one month in prison.

=== Russia ===
In May 2014, Russia's President Vladimir Putin signed a law making the denial of Nazi crimes and "wittingly spreading false information about the activity of the USSR during the years of World War Two" or portraying Nazis as heroes a criminal offence.

=== Slovakia ===
In Slovakia, Holocaust denial has been a crime since 2001 (law 485/2001), and the penal law (300/2005) specifies in §422d that "who publicly denies, approves or tries to justify the Holocaust, crimes of regimes based on fascist ideology, crimes of regimes based on communist ideology or crimes of other similar movements that use violence, the threat of violence or the threat of other serious harm with the aim of suppressing the fundamental rights and freedoms of persons shall be punished by imprisonment of six months to three years".

=== Spain ===
Genocide denial was illegal in Spain until the Constitutional Court of Spain ruled that the words "deny or" were unconstitutional in its judgement of 7 November 2007. As a result, Holocaust denial is legal in Spain, although justifying the Holocaust or any other genocide is an offence punishable by imprisonment in accordance with the constitution.

PENAL CODE- BOOK II, TITLE XXIV Crimes against the International Community

Chapter II: Crimes of genocide – Article 607.1

1. Those who, with the intention to total or partially destroy a national, ethnic, racial or religious group, perpetrate the following acts, will be punished:

1) With the prison sentence of fifteen to twenty years, if they killed to some of its members.

If the fact two or more aggravating circumstances concurred in, the greater punishment in degree will prevail.

2) With the prison of fifteen to twenty years, if they sexually attacked to some of members [of the group] or produced some of the injuries anticipated in article 149.

3) With prison sentence of eight to fifteen years, if they subjected the group or anyone of its individuals to conditions of existence that put their lives in danger or seriously disturbed their health, or when they produced some to them of the injuries anticipated in article 150.

4) With the same punishment, if they carried out [unavoidable] displacements of the group or their members, they adopted any measurement that tend to prevent their sort of life or reproduction, or transferred by force individuals from a group to another one.

5) With imprisonment of four to eight years, if they produced any other injury different from the ones indicated in numbers 2) and 3) of this section.

2. The diffusion by any means of ideas or doctrines that ~~deny or~~ justify the crimes in the previous section of this article, or tries the rehabilitation of regimes or institutions which they protect generating practices of such, will be punished with a prison sentence of one to two years.

=== Sweden ===
In May 2024, the Swedish parliament approved a proposal to outlaw Holocaust denial. Some of the legislation went into effect on 1 July 2024, while other parts will become active on 1 January 2027.

=== Switzerland ===
Holocaust denial is not expressly illegal in Switzerland, but the denial of genocide and other crimes against humanity is an imprisonable offence.

Art. 261^{bis 1}

Racial discrimination

Whoever publicly, by word, writing, image, gesture, acts of violence or any other manner, demeans or discriminates against an individual or a group of individuals because of their race, their ethnicity or their religion in a way which undermines human dignity, or on those bases, denies, coarsely minimizes or seeks to justify a genocide or other crimes against humanity [...] shall be punished with up to three years' imprisonment or a fine.

=== Ukraine ===
In September 2021, the Verkhovna Rada passed a law defining antisemitism and banning it in the country. This law includes denying the mass extermination of Jews in the Holocaust as part of its definition of antisemitism. When committed by an individual is punishable by a fine or a prison sentence of up to five years. Public officials would also be fined or imprisoned for up to five years, and banned from holding certain offices for up to three years.

=== United Kingdom ===
Holocaust denial is not illegal in the United Kingdom. However, judicial notice was taken that the Holocaust occurred in the case of R v Chabloz – the defendant in that case was charged with sharing 'grossly offensive' material related to Holocaust denial and antisemitism. Some campaigners contend that this judgement sets a precedent for material relating to Holocaust denial to be deemed "grossly offensive" and contrary to the Communications Act 2003; however, the court explicitly noted that Holocaust denial itself is not a crime, and speech denying the Holocaust is not per se grossly offensive:

However it is important to bear in mind, as Mr Davies understandably stresses, that there is no crime of Holocaust denial in this jurisdiction. Material which consists of or includes Holocaust denial can only found liability under section 127 if it is grossly offensive. No type of speech, Holocaust denial included, can be characterised as grossly offensive per se: the question of whether particular speech is grossly offensive is always fact-specific.

A 2000 report by the Institute for Jewish Policy Research concluded that Holocaust denial has a "limited impact" on British public opinion. The report acknowledged previous calls to criminalise Holocaust denial in the UK, but concluded "with unanimous view that the criminalisation of Holocaust denial in the United Kingdom would be inadvisable".

=== United States ===
In the United States, Holocaust denial is constitutionally protected free speech under the First Amendment.

A United States court in 1981, in a case brought by Mel Mermelstein, took judicial notice of the occurrence of gassings in Auschwitz during the Holocaust, declaring that a legally incontestable fact.

=== European Union ===
The European Union's Executive Commission proposed a European Union-wide anti-racism xenophobia law in 2001, which included the criminalization of Holocaust denial. On 15 July 1996, the Council of the European Union adopted the Joint action/96/443/JHA concerning action to combat racism and xenophobia. During the German presidency there was an attempt to extend this ban. Full implementation was blocked by the United Kingdom and the Nordic countries because of the need to balance the restrictions on voicing racist opinions against the freedom of expression. As a result, a compromise has been reached within the EU and while the EU has not prohibited Holocaust denial outright, a maximum term of three years in jail is optionally available to all member nations for "denying or grossly trivialising crimes of genocide, crimes against humanity and war crimes".

The EU extradition policy regarding Holocaust denial was tested in the UK during the 2008 failed extradition case brought against the suspected Holocaust denier Fredrick Töben by the German government. As there is no specific crime of Holocaust denial in the UK, the German government had applied for Töben's extradition for racial and xenophobic crimes. Töben's extradition was refused by the Westminster Magistrates' Court, and the German government withdrew its appeal to the High Court.

European Union Framework Decision for Combating Racism and Xenophobia (2007)

The text establishes that the following intentional conduct will be punishable in all EU Member States:

- Publicly inciting to violence or hatred, even by dissemination or distribution of tracts, pictures or other material, directed against a group of persons or a member of such a group defined by reference to race, colour, religion, descent or national or ethnic origin.

- Publicly condoning, denying or grossly trivialising

- crimes of genocide, crimes against humanity and war crimes as defined in the Statute of the International Criminal Court (Articles 6, 7 and 8) directed against a group of persons or a member of such a group defined by reference to race, colour, religion, descent or national or ethnic origin, and

- crimes defined by the Tribunal of Nuremberg (Article 6 of the Charter of the International Military Tribunal, London Agreement of 1945) directed against a group of persons or a member of such a group defined by reference to race, colour, religion, descent or national or ethnic origin.

Member States may choose to punish only conduct which is either carried out in a manner likely to disturb public order or which is threatening, abusive or insulting.

The reference to religion is intended to cover, at least, conduct which is a pretext for directing acts against a group of persons or a member of such a group defined by reference to race, colour, descent, or national or ethnic origin.

Member States will ensure that these conducts are punishable by criminal penalties of a maximum of at least between 1 and 3 years of imprisonment.

=== 2019 European Court of Human Rights decision ===
On 3 October 2019, in the case Pastörs v. Germany (application no. 55225/14), the European Court of Human Rights (ECHR) unanimously ruled that a decision of the German courts determining that the statement made by the German politician, Udo Pastörs, that "the so-called Holocaust is being used for political and commercial purposes" as well as other Holocaust denial comments were a violation of the memory of the dead and an intentional defamation of the Jewish people and that the courts had not violated Article 10 (freedom of expression) of the European Convention on Human Rights in convicting him for this offense. Furthermore, the ECHR decided by four votes to three that there had been no violation of Article 6 § 1 (right to a fair trial) of the European Convention on Human Rights.

== Prosecutions and convictions ==
Laws against Holocaust denial have been enforced in most jurisdictions that have them. Convictions and sentencings include:

Date	Name	Country where the sentence was pronounced	Sentence
September 1987, June 1999, April 2016	Jean-Marie Le Pen	France, Germany	fines of €183,000 (1987), €6,000 (1999) and €30,000 (2016)
27 February 1998	Roger Garaudy	France	6 months' imprisonment (suspended), ₣240,000 (€37,500) fine
21 July 1998	Jürgen Graf	Switzerland	15 months' imprisonment (fled Switzerland to avoid sentence)
21 July 1998	Gerhard Förster	Switzerland	12 months' imprisonment, disgorgement
8 April 1999	Fredrick Töben	Australia	7 months' imprisonment Mannheim, Germany – retrial – 2011 indefinitely stayed by judge Dr Meinerzhagen. 1 October – 19 November 2008, London, extradition to Mannheim, Germany, on European Arrest Warrant issued by Germany, failed. 15 August – 12 November 2009, Adelaide, Australia – for contempt of court because he refused to stop questioning the Holocaust's 3 basics: 6 million, systematic state extermination, gas chambers as murder weapon.
27 May 1999	Jean Plantin	France	6 months' imprisonment (suspended), fine, damages
11 April 2000	Gaston-Armand Amaudruz	Switzerland	1 year's imprisonment, damages
20 February 2006	David Irving	Austria	3 years' imprisonment. Released and deported after serving 13 months.
15 March 2006	Germar Rudolf	Germany	2 1/2 years' imprisonment
3 October 2006	Robert Faurisson	France	€7,500 fine, 3 months' probation
15 February 2007	Ernst Zündel	Germany	5 years' imprisonment
8 November 2007	Vincent Reynouard	France	1 year's imprisonment and a fine of 10,000 euros
14 January 2008	Wolfgang Fröhlich	Austria	6 years' imprisonment (third offence)
15 January 2008	Sylvia Stolz	Germany	3 1/2 years' imprisonment
11 March 2009	Horst Mahler	Germany	5 years' imprisonment
27 October 2009	Richard Williamson	Germany	€12,000 fine (later overturned)
16 August 2012	Udo Pastörs	Germany	8-months' imprisonment, suspended on probation.
31 January 2013	György Nagy	Hungary	18-month suspended prison sentence
11 February 2015	Vincent Reynouard	France	2 years' imprisonment
12 November 2015	Ursula Haverbeck	Germany	10 months' imprisonment
26 October 2018	Alfred Schaefer	Germany	3 years and 2 months imprisonment
26 October 2018	Monika Schaefer	Germany	10 months time served
4 February 2021	Vasile Zărnescu	Romania	13 months' imprisonment
31 March 2022	Philip Hassler (Mr. Bond)	Austria	10 years' imprisonment
1 October 2025	Kenneth Paulin	Canada	9 months in jail

== See also ==
- Anti-BDS laws
- Anti-fascism
- Antisemitism by country
- Armenian genocide denial § Legality
- Evidence and documentation for the Holocaust
- Freedom of speech
- Freedom of speech by country
- Genocide recognition politics
- Rwandan genocide denial, which is illegal in Rwanda
- Secondary antisemitism
