= Susan Renouf =

Australian socialite (1942–2016)

Susan, Lady Renouf
- Born: Susan Rossiter; 15 July 1942; Australia
- Died: 15 July 2016 (aged 74); Australia
- Spouse(s): Andrew Peacock (1963–1978; divorced, 3 children); Robert Sangster (1976–1978; annulled; 1978–1985; divorced Sir Frank Renouf (1985–1988; divorced)
- Children: 3
- Parent(s): Sir John Rossiter; Joan, Lady Rossiter (née Stewart)

Susan, Lady Renouf (née Rossiter; 15 July 1942 – 15 July 2016) was an Australian socialite. Her title was acquired through her third marriage to New Zealand businessman Sir Frank Renouf.

== Early life ==
Renouf was born Susan Rossiter in Melbourne, Victoria, on 15 July 1942. Her father, Sir John Frederick Rossiter (17 December 1913 – 18 January 1988), had an extensive career in politics, firstly as a Liberal member of Victoria's Legislative Assembly and later as the state's agent-general in London. On 1 March 1939 he married Joan Stewart.

Renouf grew up in the Melbourne suburb of Brighton, where she attended Firbank Girls' Grammar School. She continued her education at Star of the Sea College in Brighton, RMIT International Marketing Institute in Boston, USA, University of Melbourne and Monash University, Melbourne. Embarking on a career in law, Renouf later changed career and became a reporter for the women's pages of the Melbourne Sun.

== Marriage and family life ==
Susan Renouf, her daughter Anne Peacock, and her two grandsons in her home in Toorak

At the age of 20, Renouf met and married Andrew Peacock, who at the time was the president of the Young Liberals. Peacock went on to become president of the Victorian Party, hold a Liberal seat in Federal parliament, and become Minister for the Army in the Government of Australia. They had three children together; Caroline, Anne and Jane, and became known as a strong and successful duo within the political arena.

In 1976, Renouf met Robert Sangster, labelling him as “the love of [her] life”; however, she remained with Peacock and her children until the federal election was over in order to protect his political reputation. After 13 years of marriage, Renouf divorced Peacock in 1977 and in 1978 married Sangster, later moving to his home on the Isle of Man. Sangster was a well-known British businessman and successful thoroughbred racehorse trainer, owner, and breeder. The height of his career saw thirteen wins in the period 1977 to 1984, in which he had horses racing across the globe. At one stage, Sangster's portfolio spanned 1,000 horses in training and at stud within the United Kingdom, United States, South America and Australia, whilst also titling him as Britain's leading racehorse owner five consecutive times. Within this period, Renouf and Sangster were skyrocketed into British high society, quickly becoming well known amongst international royalty and A-listers. Renouf's children visited from time to time at Sangster's Isle of Man property, but international races saw continual travel for the pair as Sangster bought, sold and trained his horses throughout the world.

In 1985 following the news of Sangster's affairs, their marriage ended and later that year, Renouf met and married Frank Renouf, a New Zealand financier. The 1987 stock market crash saw a drop in fortunes for both parties, leading to a media scandal over the fight for possession of the Point Piper mansion gifted to Renouf during her marriage to Sangster.

== Life in the public eye ==
Peacock and Renouf's marriage was largely centred around press attention, particularly with Peacock's newfound position within the Victorian party. In no time at all, Renouf's name was widely known not just for her affiliation with her husband, but for her fashion and style, featuring on numerous magazine spreads in high-end clothing. At times Renouf expressed her interest in parliament and politics, even at one stage having considered running for Victoria's Upper House however, she later revealed she had yielded to her husband's wishes that his career took precedence.

In 1970, she became the focus of a minor political scandal in Australia when she appeared in print advertisements for Sheridan brand bedsheets while her then husband, Andrew Peacock, was Minister for the Army in the Second Gorton Ministry. The advertisement read "Susan Peacock, wife of Australia's youngest Minister of State, adores Sheridan Sheets". This was in breach of a rule which forbids the linking of parliament to any commercial advertising. Despite intending to donate her profits to charity, Renouf was deeply criticised, causing her husband to offer his resignation as a result.

Members of parliament, Prime Minister John Gorton and Opposition Leader Gough Whitlam, denied Peacock's resignation and Renouf later revealed in a 2015 interview with ABC's Australian Story that "It was horrible for me, because I felt I'd ruined his career". Renouf was later invited by Frank Packer to work part-time on an all-female Channel Nine TV current affairs show known as 'No Man's Land', and at her husband's approval. However, it was not long before the birth of their three children and Peacock's career saw their lives moving in different directions.

In 1980, Sangster's horse Beldale Ball won the Melbourne Cup race. Renouf later commented that winning the Cup with Sangster was a momentous day and occasion, one that would be hard to outmatch. However, their romance was short lived as Sangster had numerous affairs with younger women. Most well known was his affair with model and girlfriend of rock star Mick Jagger, Jerry Hall. Renouf was the last to be made aware of the situation and said that it was “devastatingly hurtful”. The couple did try to repair their marriage, but in May 1984 Sangster had another affair with former model Sue Lilley, the then wife of a British shoe millionaire.

Renouf's name within Melbourne's social scene saw her as a leading lady for 50 years of fashion and trend-setting. Despite her love of clothing and design, Renouf revealed her regrets surrounding her obedience to first husband Andrew Peacock in backing down on pursuing a political career. Those within her inner circle have also stated that Renouf would have been a great politician had she actively worked within the field. Jeanne Pratt, billionaire philanthropist and friend to Renouf, often expressed that Renouf's intelligence was overlooked and overshadowed by her life as a socialite.

Following the breakdown of her second marriage, Renouf rushed into a marriage with Sir Frank Renouf despite the 25-year age gap between them. In 1985, Sir Frank paid what was at the time the highest-ever price for a Sydney home, when he bought the mansion "Paradis sur Mer" in Wolseley Crescent at Point Piper, where the vendor was her second husband, Robert Sangster. The house was eventually razed. At the time Renouf delved into the financial world taking on the role as director of Renouf Corporation. Renouf's position within the company did not end well in 1998. After the 2008 financial crisis, there was a public grapple for the possession of the harbourside mansion due to the sudden and drastic loss of Sir Frank's fortunes. However, the property was later demolished and rebuilt as two houses in 1990. Their divorce was as public as their marriage had been and the two did not separate on good terms.

After the breakdown of her third and final marriage, Renouf was involved in numerous short-lived scandals including the burglary of some of her houses and cars. The most well-known case was her housekeeper of 14 years who stole over $50,000 worth of jewellery, which Renouf recognised being worn by the wife of a Sydney meat wholesaler at a social luncheon.

Renouf's other passions flourished in the following years, with her love of design and architecture apparent in the six homes she bought, redecorated, and on-sold in the years following 1988. Four of her properties made considerable profits, and Renouf's friend and former Vogue Australia editor, Sheila Scotter, had described her unique style as “horny and blokey”. Renouf's career in fashion took off with clothing brands Just Jeans and Myer, and beauty producer L'Oreal. Her short-lived role in Renouf Corporations saw her knowledge in finance extended to Jesuit Social Services – Marketing, Chairman St. Joan of Arc, and Treasurer of the Inaugural Board of Star of the Sea College.

== Illness and death ==
Renouf was diagnosed with ovarian cancer in 2013, with only an estimated five months left to live. Following an aggressive treatment plan, Renouf had surgery and several rounds of chemotherapy. Approaching the end of her life, Renouf received palliative care following her diagnosis of acute kidney failure.

During her 2015 interview with Australian Story, when asked about how Renouf had coped dealing with cancer she replied that the ongoing support of her "inner spirit and family and friends ... Or you put on Human Nature and do a bit of a jive around the room" was what had kept her going.

Renouf died on 15 July 2016, her 74th birthday. She was survived by her three daughters, Caroline, Anne, and Jane.

== Legacy ==
Following her diagnosis of ovarian cancer in 2013, Renouf dedicated her remaining years to raising awareness of ovarian cancer and the importance for women to have regular cervical health checks in order to catch signs of cancer at an early stage.

She will also be remembered by her many charitable acts, notably her donation of $37,400 to Melbourne's St Vincent Institute towards the purchase of a protein identification machine. Following the $1.475 million sale in 2007 of her Sidney Nolan Kelly Outlaw painting, Renouf donated to many other charitable sources as well.
