= Rue Voltaire, Reims =

French street

Rue Voltaire
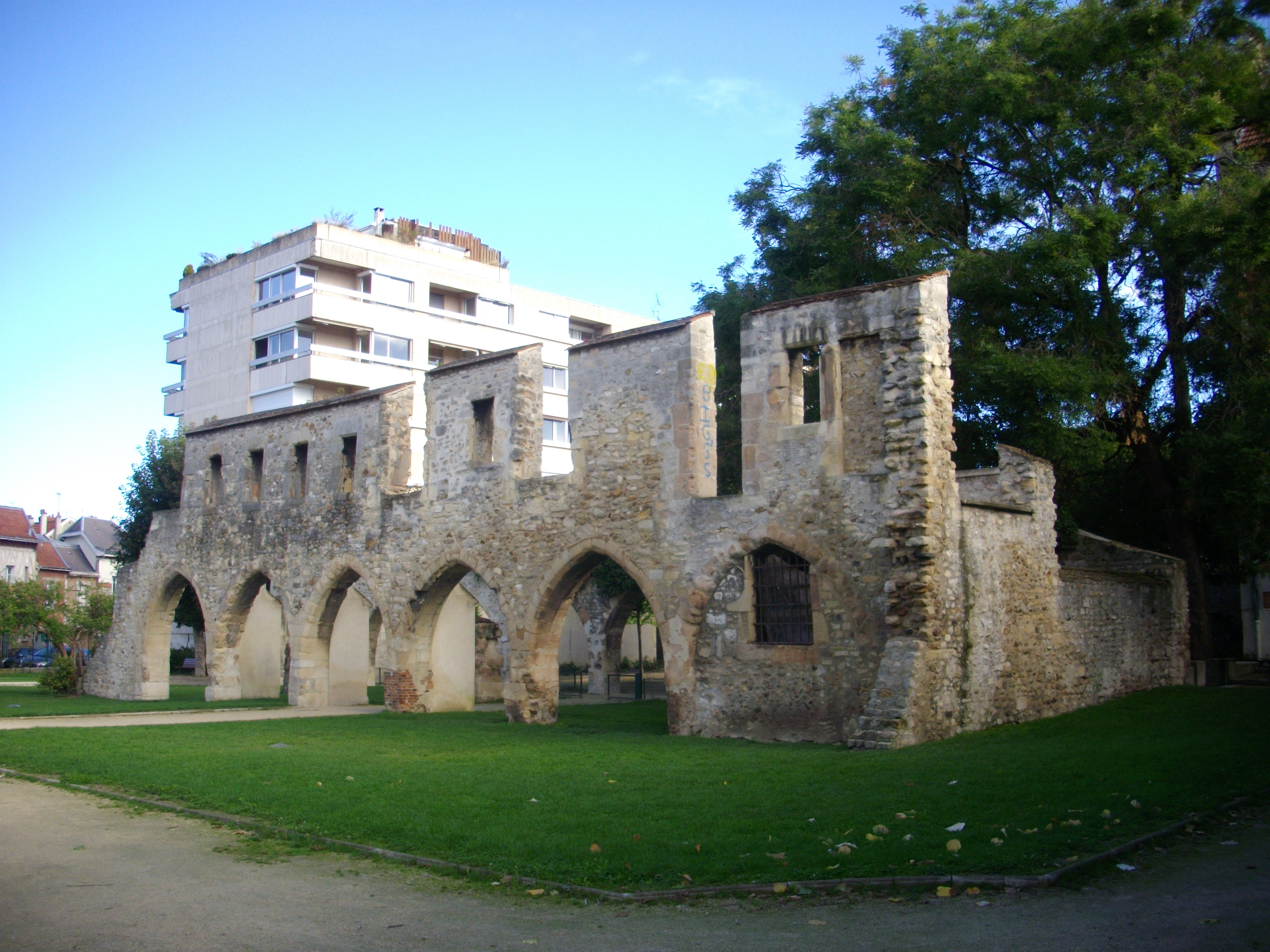
- Length: 700 m (2,300 ft)
- Location: Reims
- Coordinates: 49°15′15″N 4°02′13″E

Rue Voltaire (French pronunciation: [ʁy vɔltɛʁ]) is a thoroughfare in the French commune of Reims, located in the Marne department, in the Grand Est region.

== Description ==
=== Location and access ===
Rue Voltaire administratively belongs to the Center Ville district, it is slightly downhill.

=== Origin of the name ===
It bears the name of the French writer François Marie Arouet, known as Voltaire (1694-1778).

== History ==
This is one of the routes due to the destruction of the First World War. It is one of the new streets created by the new urban plan resulting from the reconstruction, it is on the Ford plan.

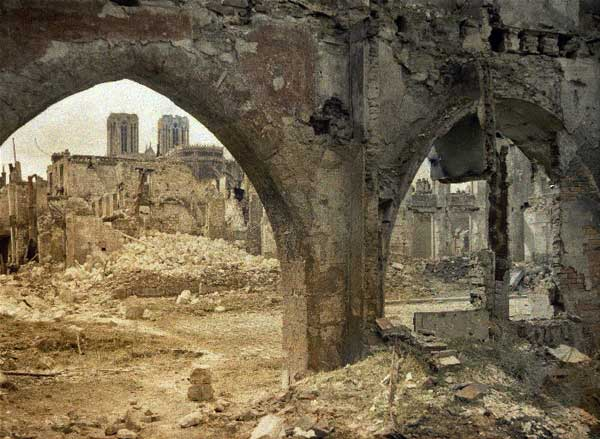
The Cordeliers convent in 1917.

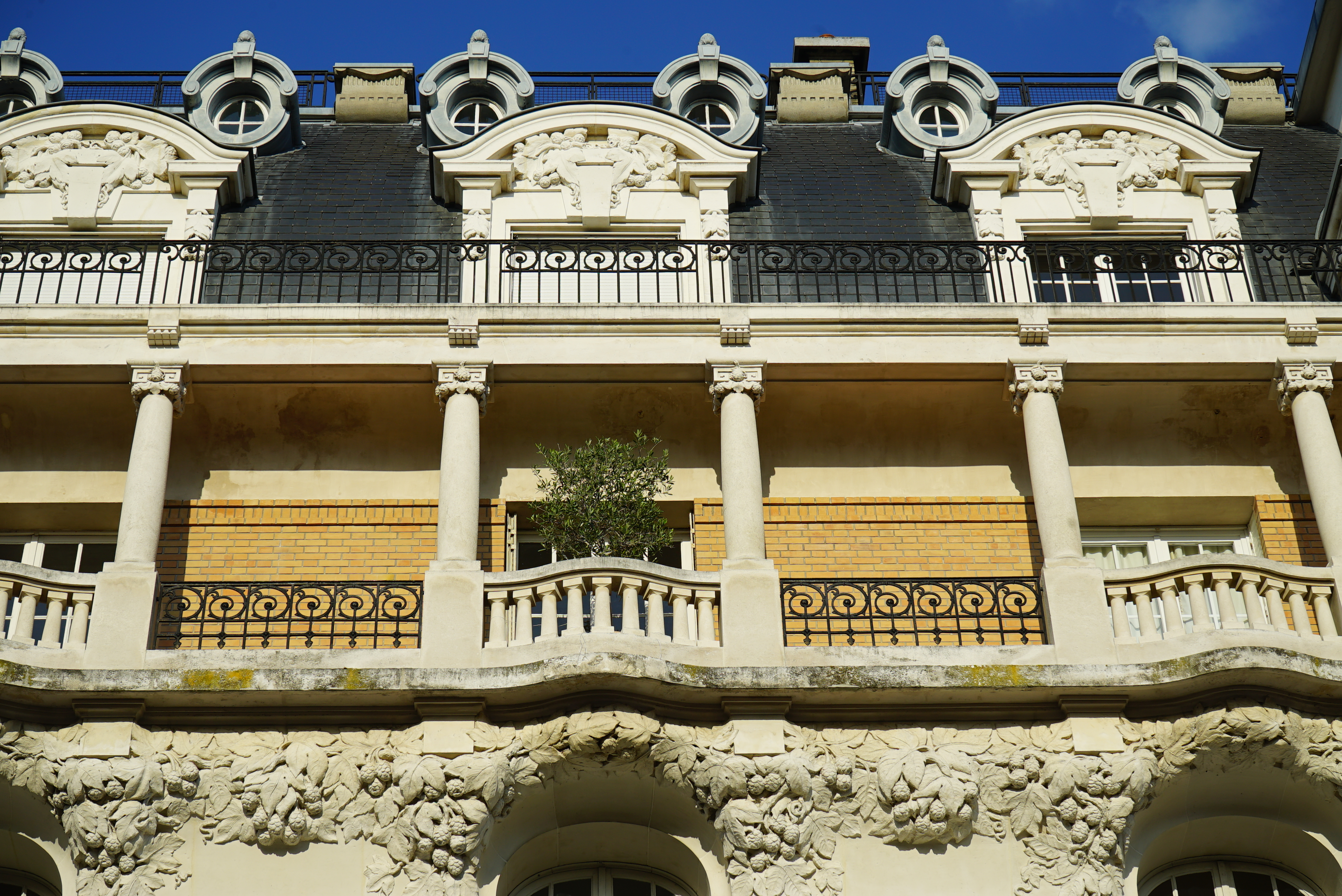
Art deco building.

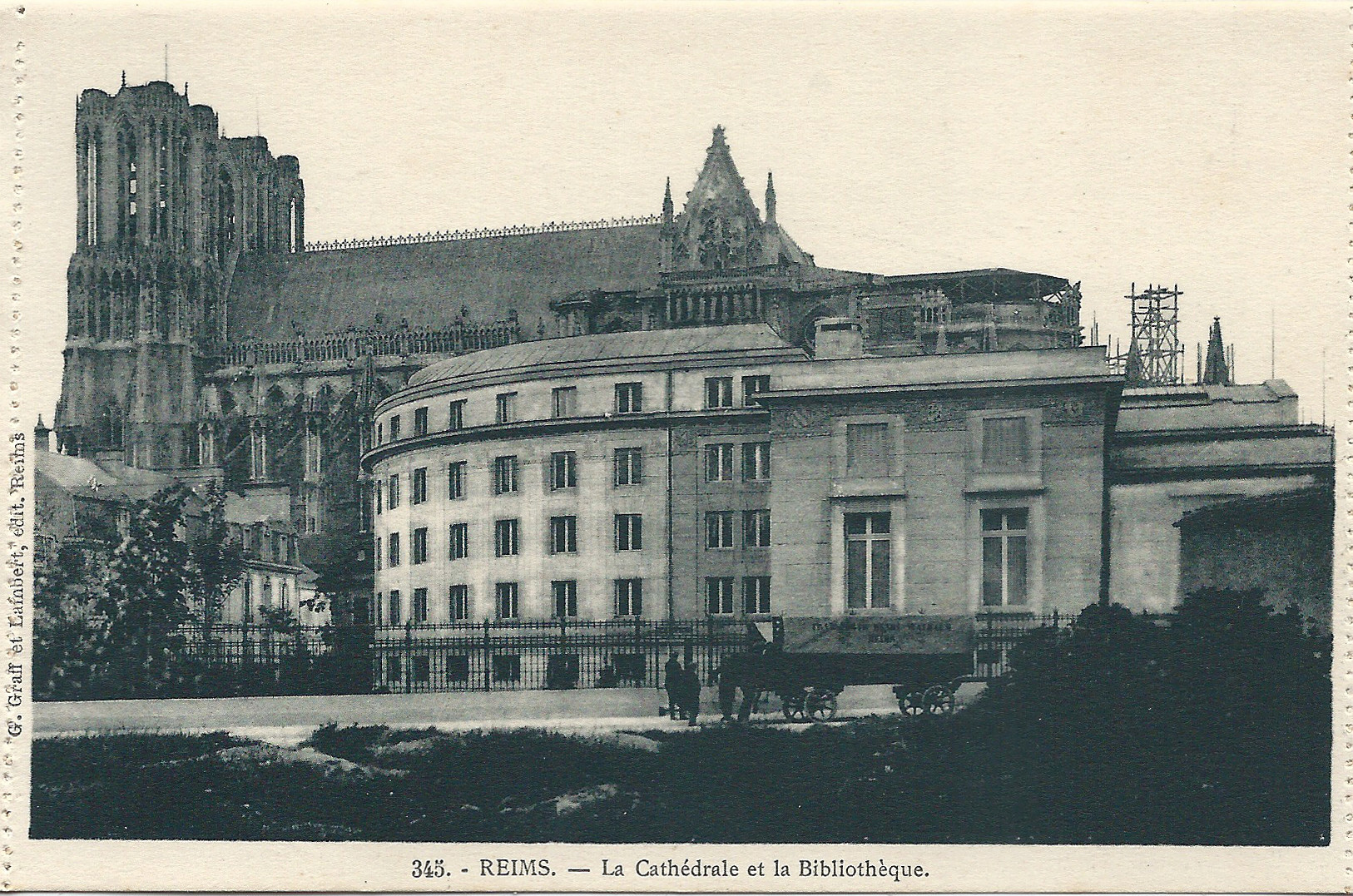
The library and place Carnegie seen from the street.

== Remarkable buildings and places of memory ==
- At n°2: the University College (under renovation);
- Carnegie Library of Reims;
- At n°12: a town house designed by Max Sainsaulieu. It is included as heritage elements of local interest;
- At n°14: art deco house by architect Robert Jactat included in the general inventory of Grand-Est heritage;
- At n°23: a building by René Lhomme. It is included as heritage elements of local interest;
- Opposite n°23: Couvent des Cordeliers de Reims;
- At n°40: a building by Émile Thion and Michel Rousseau. It is included as heritage elements of local interest.
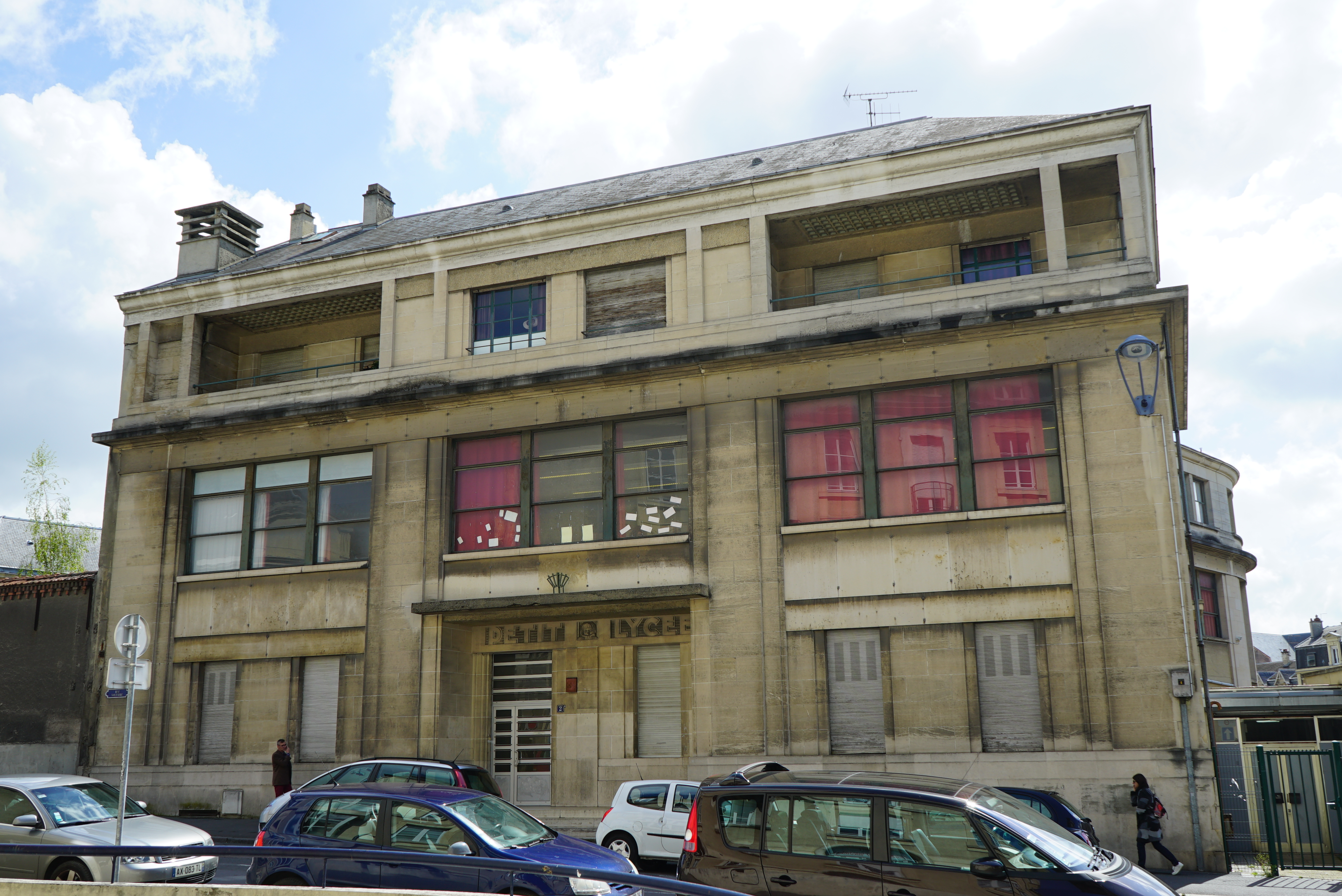
At n°2 the university college.

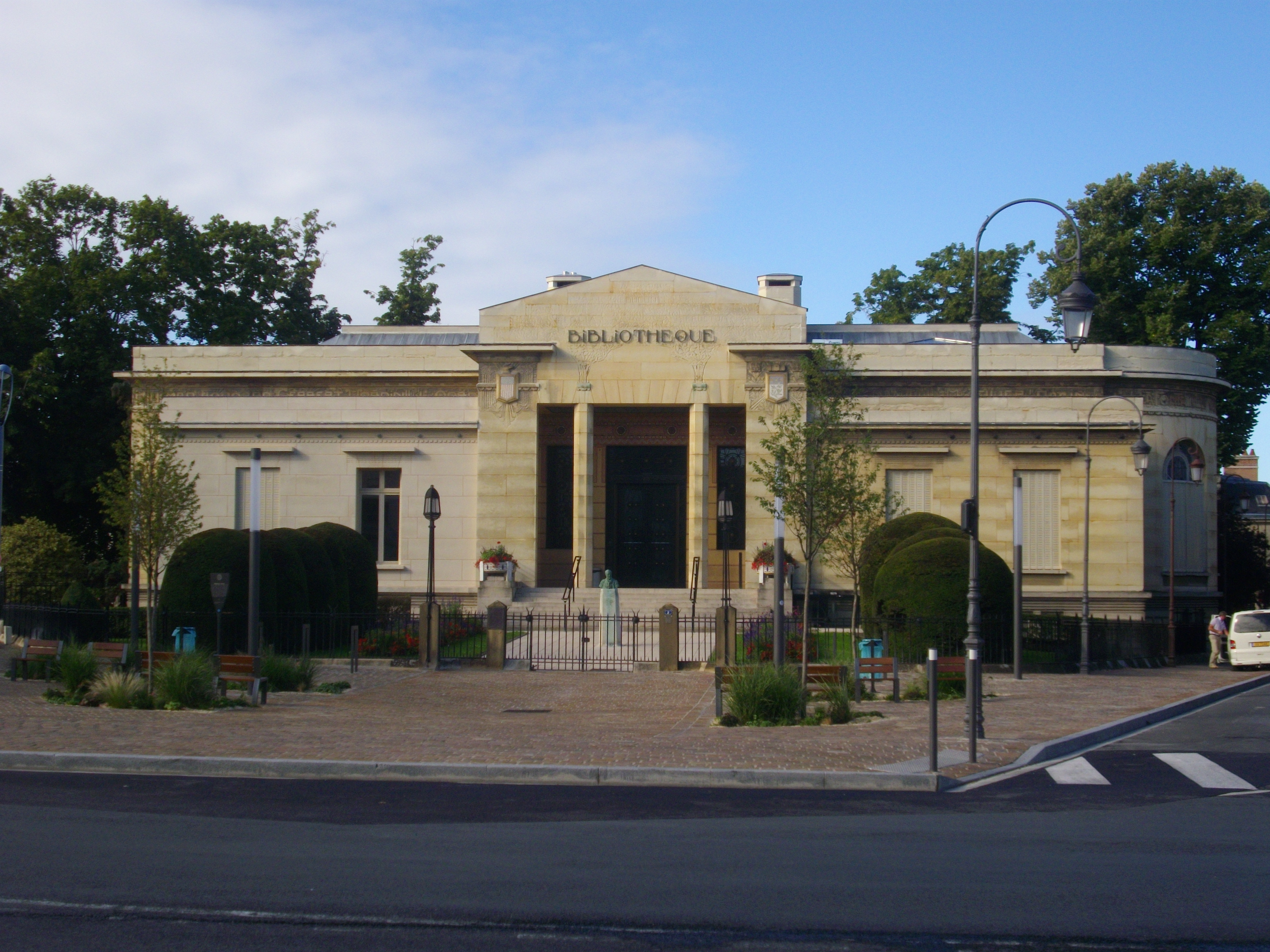
Carnegie Library of Reims.

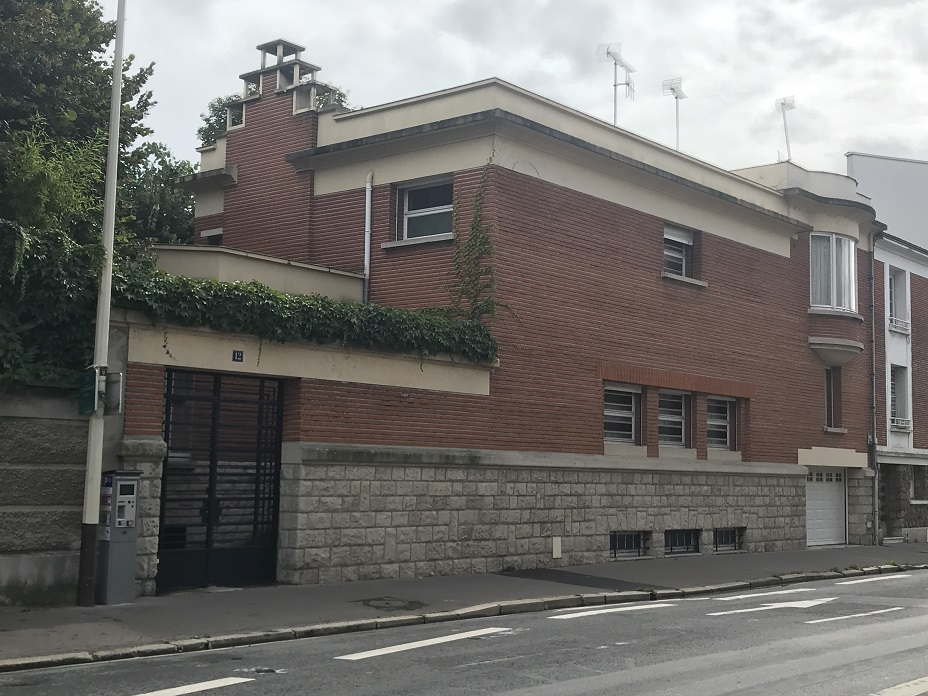
At n°12 town house.

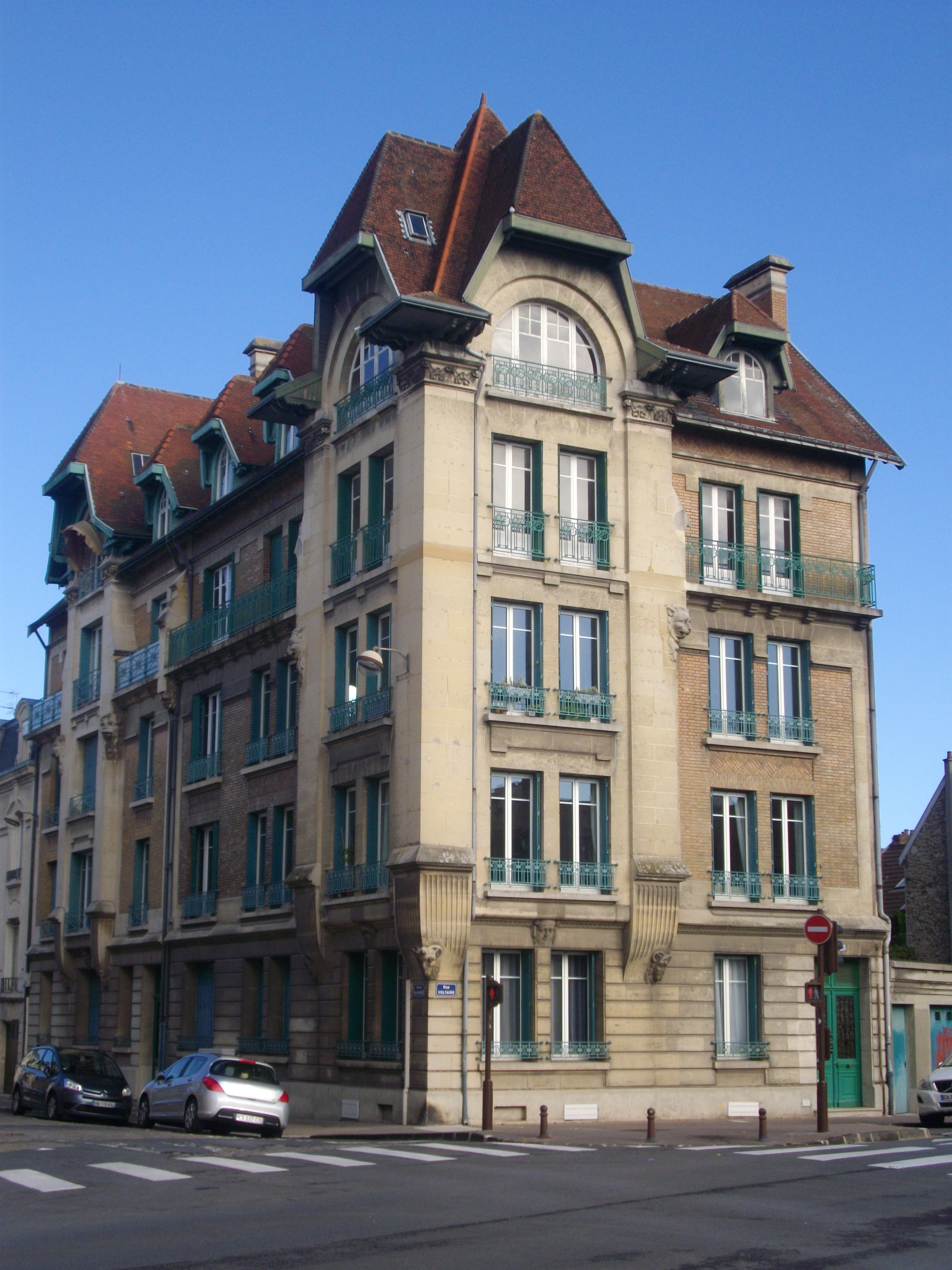
At n°23 building of René Lhomme.

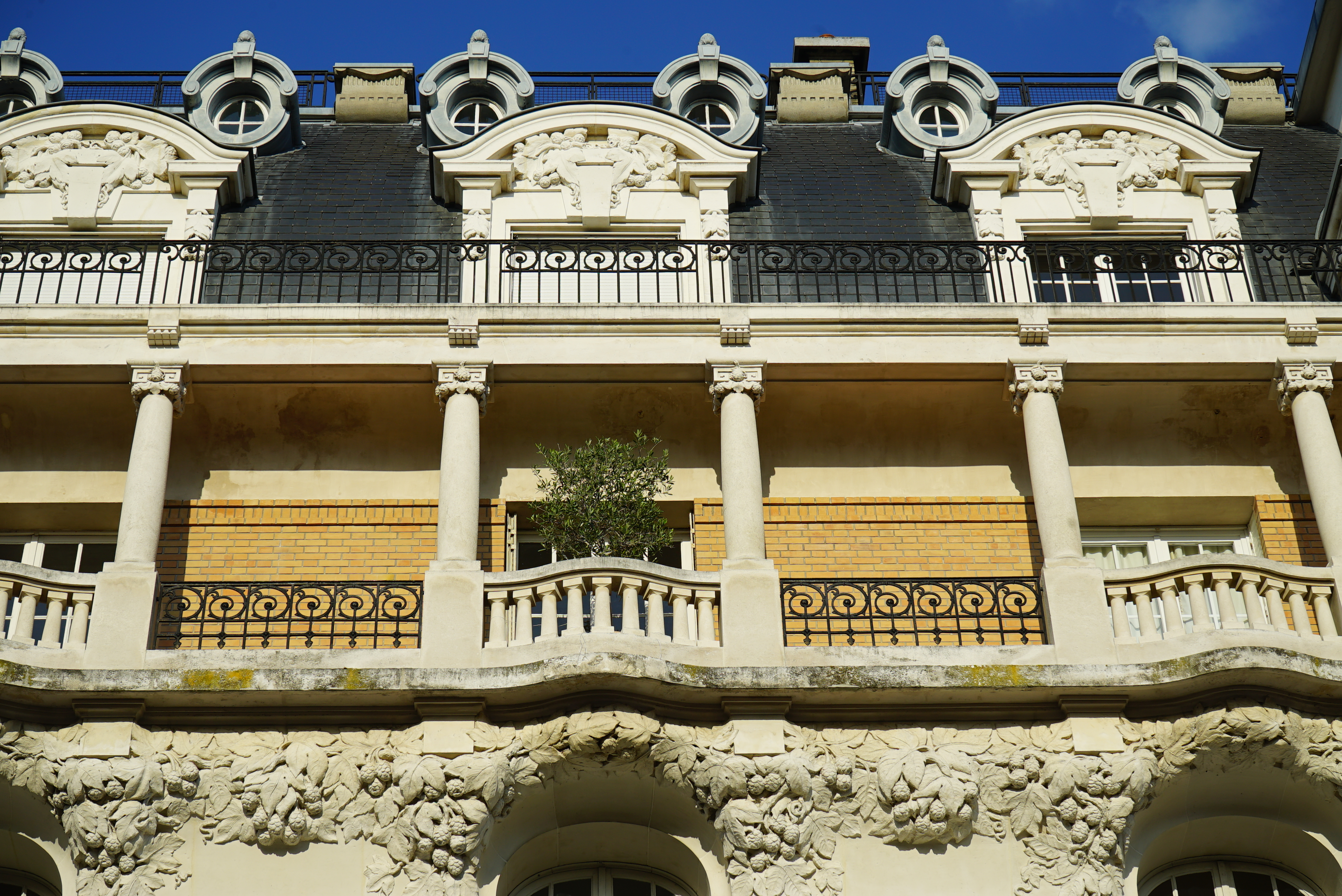
At n°40 building of Émile Thion and Michel Rousseau.

== See also ==
- List of streets and squares in Reims
