= Adelaide Institute =

Holocaust denial group

The Adelaide Institute was a Holocaust denial group in Australia considered to be antisemitic by the Australian Human Rights Commission and others. The Adelaide Institute was formed in 1995 from the former Truth Mission that was established in 1994 by Fredrick Töben, later a convicted Holocaust denier. Töben directed the Institute until his incarceration in 2009 in South Australia for contempt of court. Peter Hartung assumed the role of director of the Adelaide Institute. On assuming the role from Töben, Hartung defied the Federal Court by publishing the revisionist material that led to Töben's three months jail time. In June 2009, the Adelaide Institute was linked with an American white supremacist, James von Brunn, charged with killing a security guard in Washington's Holocaust Museum.

Töben and his associates at the Adelaide Institute have denied "being Holocaust deniers" in interviews conducted by Australian media, claiming they cannot deny that which never happened. The Institute's stated goal is to restore the honour of Nazism by claiming that the Holocaust is a Jewish lie, but the site stopped updating after Toben's sudden death in 2020, and is now officially defunct.

== Activities ==
Supporters of the Institute have in the past been active in organizations such as Australians For Free Speech, which held a rally in 1994. The Institute has also been implicated in distributing Holocaust denialist material through mainstream and alternative publications. Letters to the editor and talk radio appear to be the favourite means of disseminating the worldview of the Institute. Prior to the opening of the film Schindler's List in Adelaide, members of the institute distributed Holocaust denial pamphlets on the street and through the mail, apparently targeting those of Jewish background. Additionally, members of the Institute sent materials denying the Holocaust to prominent Australian newspapers masquerading as objective movie reviews, some of which reached publication.

The activity of the Institute appears to have declined since its initial burst of activity in the mid-1990s. The Institute did maintain a website on which statements on various issues were posted from time to time but the site itself went from barely active to inactive to defunct as Toben's declining health and lack of support led to him posting fewer items even before he died in 2020, and the site basically died along with him.

== Legal action against Töben ==
The Adelaide Institute website triggered the arrest of Fredrick Töben in Germany in 1998 for breaching Germany's Holocaust Law, Section 130, that outlaws "Incitement to hatred". Töben was sentenced in April 1999 to 10 months in prison, but had already served seven months during trial, and was released upon payment of a $5000 bond-Kaution.

The Institute's website was drawn to the attention of the Australian Human Rights and Equal Opportunity Commission (HREOC) in 2000, which ruled in Jones v Toben [2000] HREOCA 39 that a person contravenes section 18C of the Racial Discrimination Act when they refer to the treatment of Jews in the 1930s and 1940s as having been "mythologised". The HREOC found that the Adelaide Institute had breached section 18C by publishing material on the website the consequences of which were "vilificatory, bullying, insulting and offensive" to the Jewish population, and ordered Töben to close the site and apologise to the people he had offended.

As rulings of the HREOC are not enforceable at law, the case went to the Federal Court of Australia to enforce the Commission's decision. The Court ordered in 2002 that Töben remove from the Adelaide Institute website any material which conveys one or any of the following imputations:

- there is serious doubt that the Holocaust occurred
- it is unlikely that there were homicidal gas chambers at Auschwitz
- Jews who are offended by and challenge Holocaust denial are of limited intelligence
- some Jews, for improper purposes, including financial gain, have exaggerated the number of Jews killed during World War II and the circumstances in which they were killed.

In Toben v Jones (2003) 129 FCR 515, [2003] FCAFC 137, the Full Court of the Federal Court dismissed an appeal from those orders, in which Töben challenged the constitutional validity of section 18C.

Electronic Frontiers Australia spoke out against the ruling, taking the view that "when encountering racist or hateful speech, the best remedy to be applied is generally more speech, not enforced silence." One of the reasons mentioned is that suppressing such content results in perception that the speaker must have something important to say, and "massively increased interest in what would otherwise be marginal ideas."

== Associates ==
- John Tuson Bennett (1937–2013), one of Australia's longest and most active Holocaust deniers, active in the Holocaust denial movement since the late 1970s.
- Kerry Bolton, a New Zealand neo-Nazi and Holocaust denier who published many books promoting an extreme neo-Nazi, antisemitic viewpoint. He is widely cited as holding nationalist views and was involved in several nationalist and fascist political groups in New Zealand.
- Arthur Butz, American Holocaust denier and author of The Hoax of the Twentieth Century: The Case Against the Presumed Extermination of European Jewry (1976).
- Doug Collins (1920–2001), a Canadian journalist who was fined over four articles he wrote about the Holocaust and Jews, and who called the Holocaust movie Schindler's List "Swindler's List".
- Robert Faurisson, France, Europe's leading Holocaust denier and known as the principal teacher of Ernst Zündel, German Holocaust denier and pamphleteer who was jailed several times for publishing hate literature.
- Jürgen Graf, as a Swiss citizen and author of several books about Holocaust denial, Graf was prosecuted, along with his publisher, Gerhard Förster, for denying the gas chambers and the six million figure. In July 1998 a Swiss court sentenced him to 15 months imprisonment, and to pay a large fine, because of his denial writings.
- Ingrid Rimland, a Canadian Holocaust denier, whose writings are regarded in Canada as hate material. She died in 2017.
- Germar Rudolf, German Holocaust denier.
- Peter Hartung, the last director of the Adelaide Institute before it fully collapsed.
