= Rue Voltaire, Sceaux =

French street

Rue Voltaire
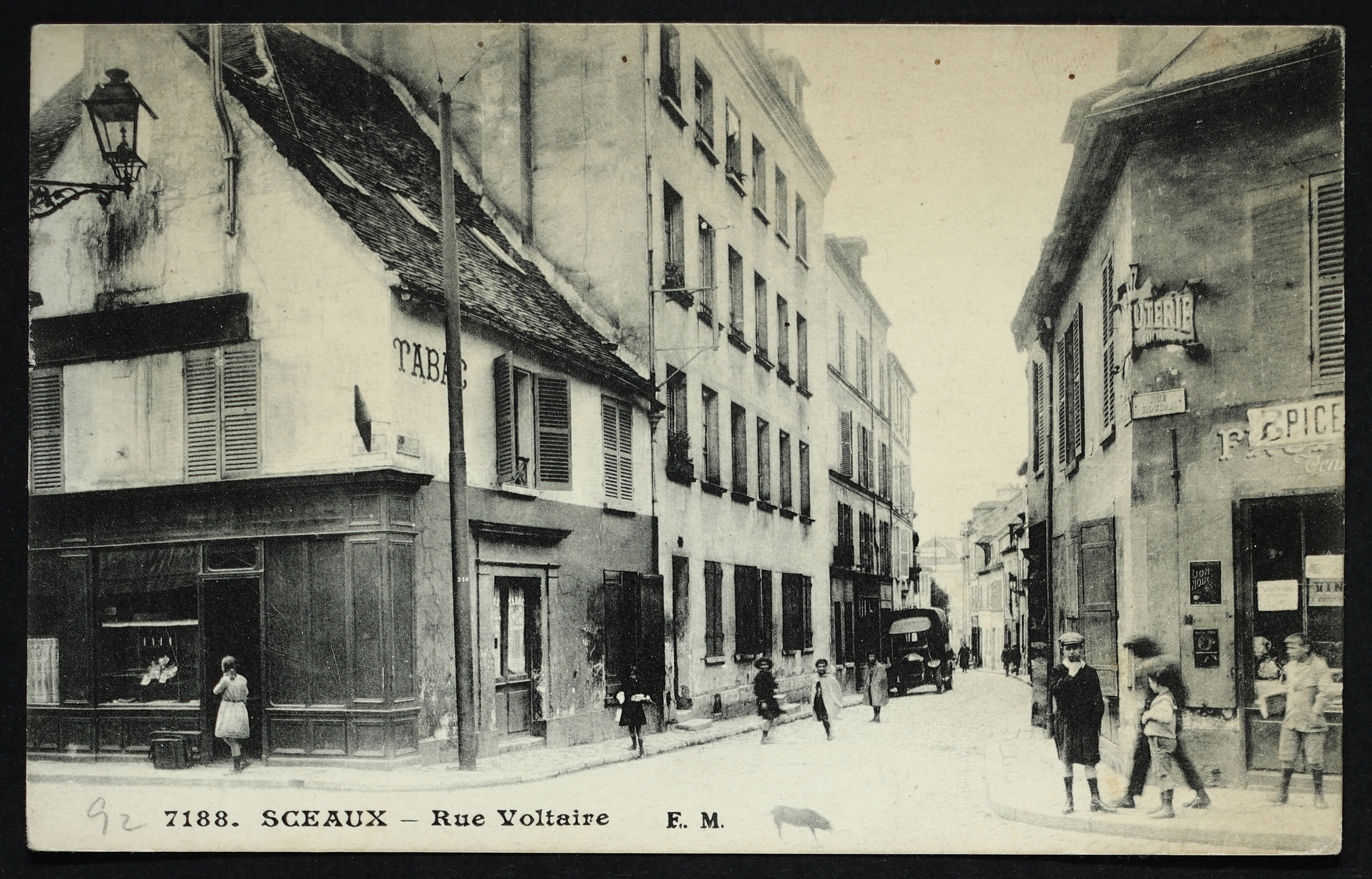
- Location: Sceaux
- Coordinates: 48°46′39″N 2°17′24″E

The Rue Voltaire (French pronunciation: [ʁy vɔltɛʁ]) is a street in the town of Sceaux in the Hauts-de-Seine, France.

== Location and access ==
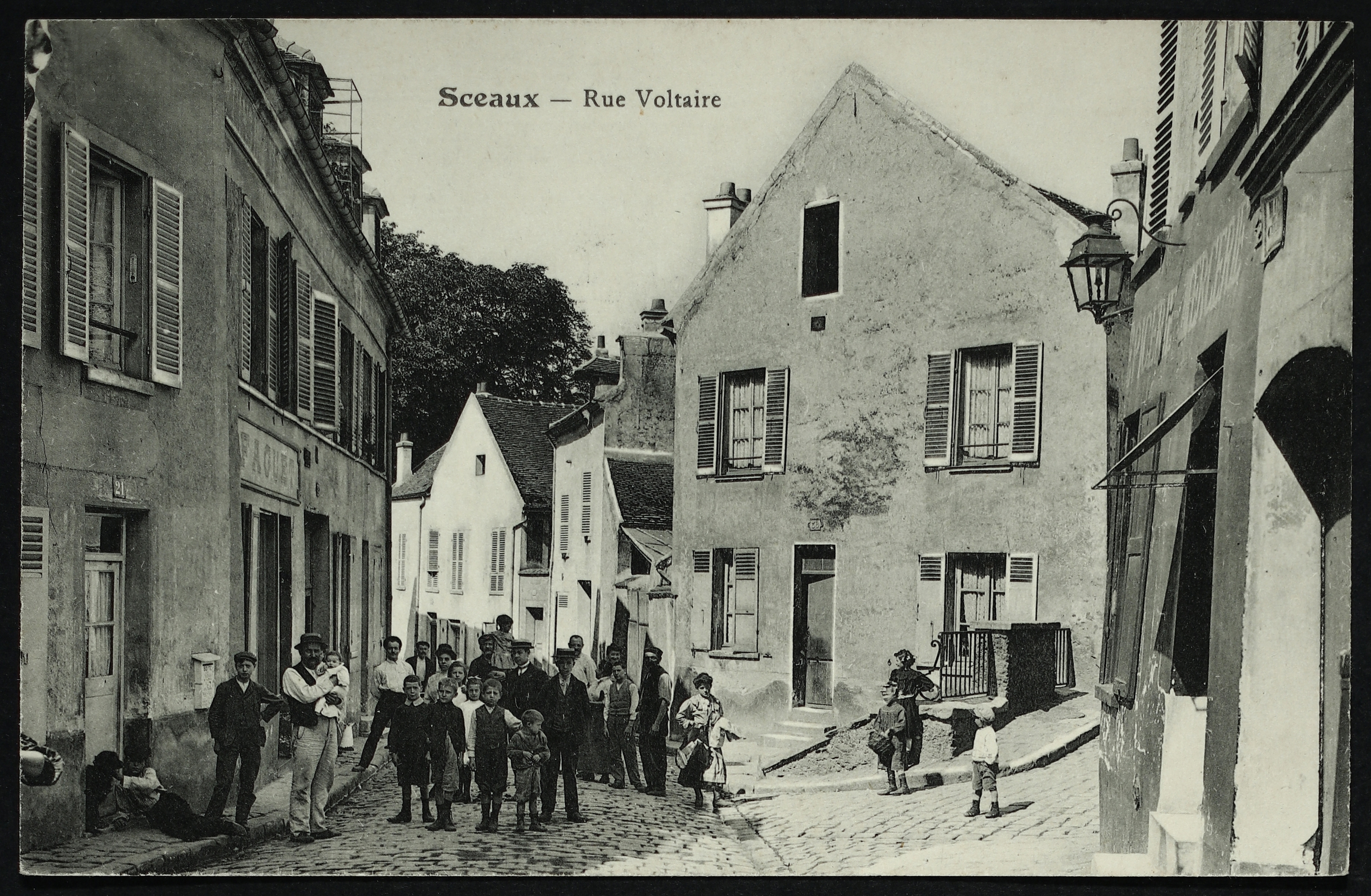
Rue Voltaire in Sceaux around 1900

It begins its route to the north, the Place du Général-de-Gaulle, roundabout of the Rue de Fontenay, the Avenue de Camberwell and the Rue Houdan.

It meets, among other things, the Rue Émile-Morel (formerly the Rue des Agriculteurs) and the Rue du Four, a very old road in the city.

It ends in the axis of the Avenue Cauchy, at the height of the Rue des Imbergères.

== Origin of the name ==
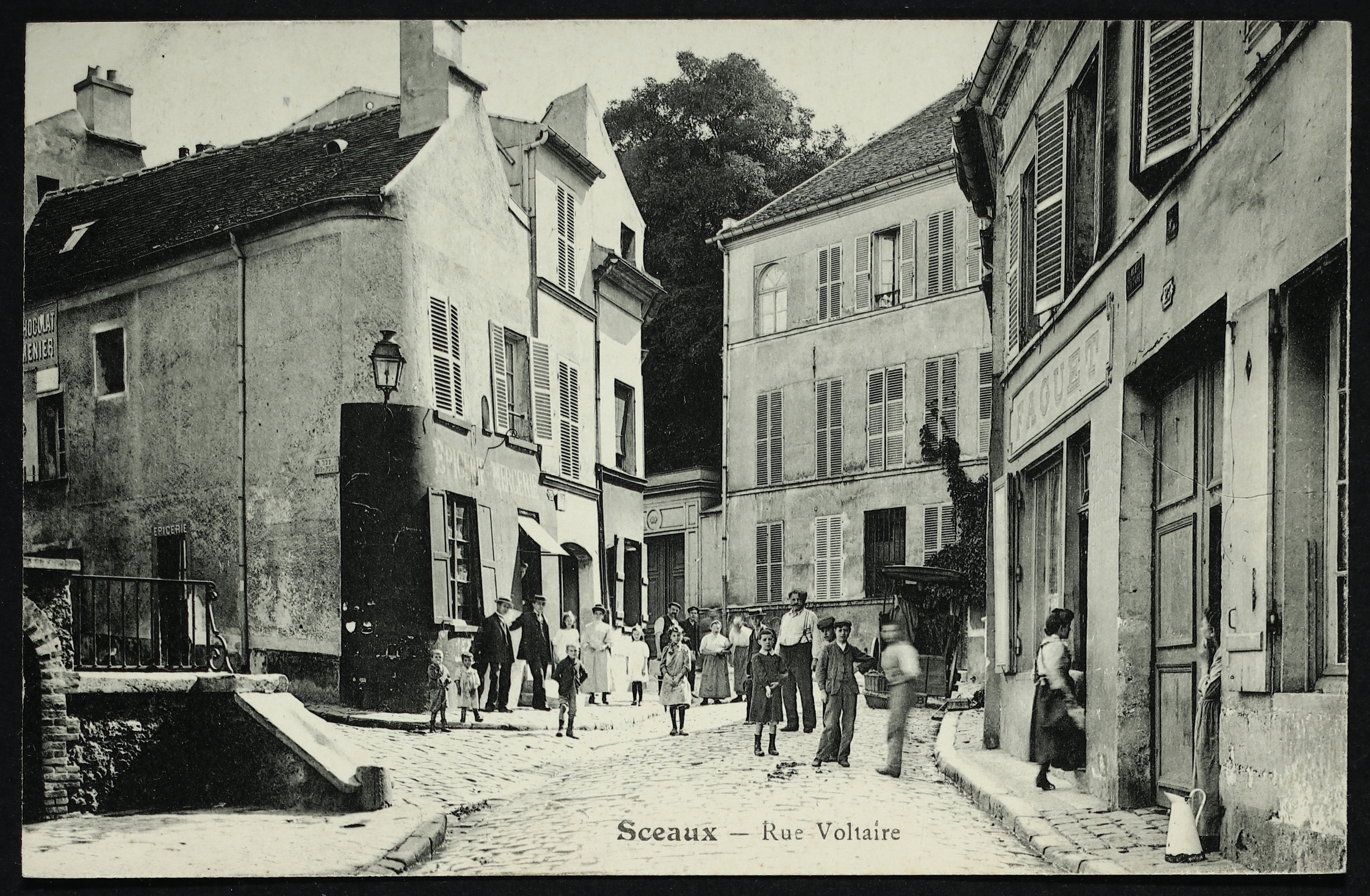
Postcard of the Rue Voltaire

This street, which has no other name and whose existence dates back at least to 1833, bears the name of the French writer François Marie Arouet, known as Voltaire (1694–1778).

== History ==
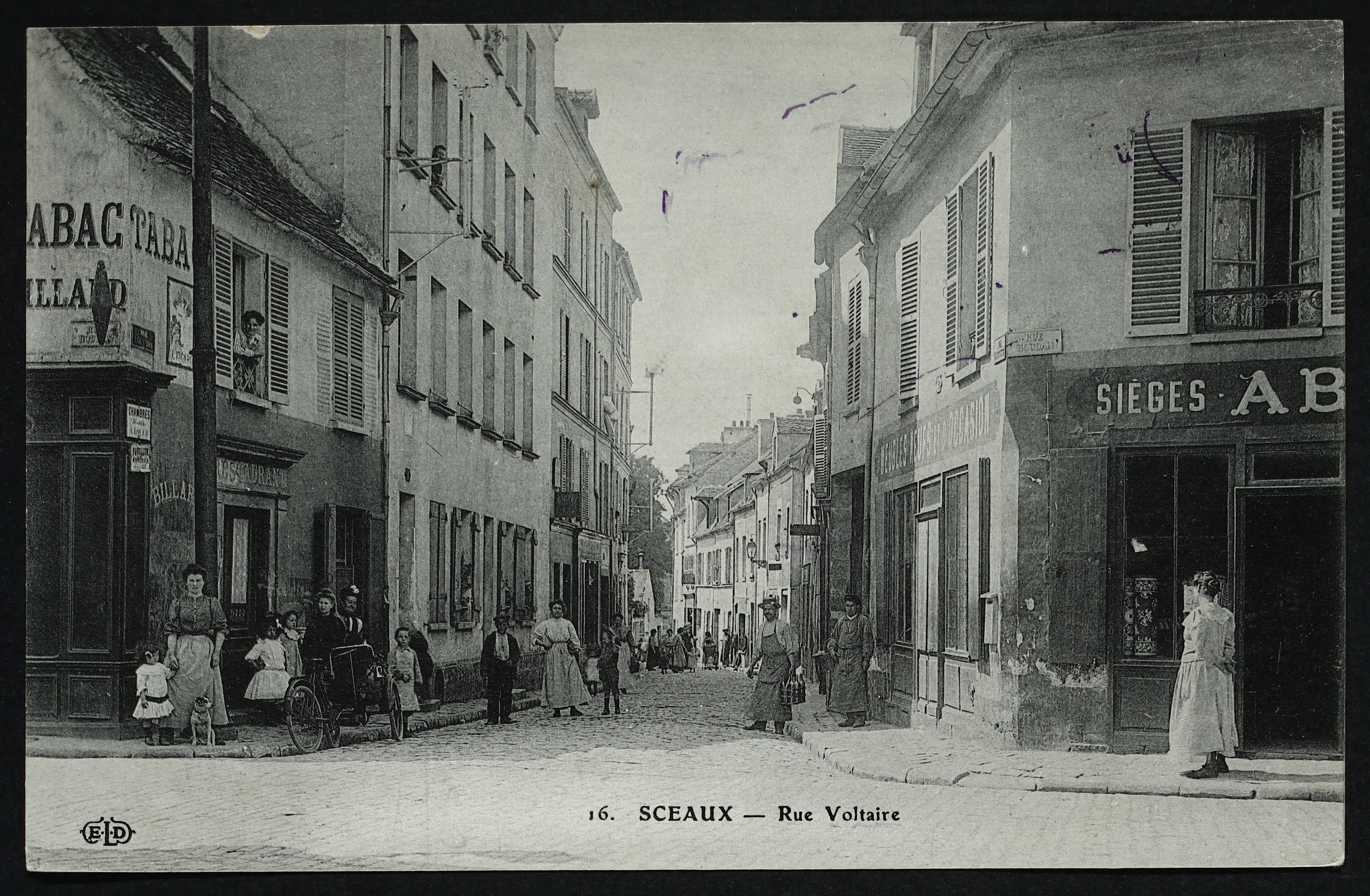
Rue Voltaire, corner of the Rue Houdan.

The original alleyway had a zigzagging path between historical residences, led to both a communal watering point and a wash house. Its route included a notable bend where it skirted the periphery of the Château des Imbergères, a building built on the foundations of a 16th-century country house. The château experienced numerous ownership changes throughout the centuries. In 1910, the property underwent its final sale; the subsequent owners leased the main house to a wine merchant.

The establishment of the Rue Voltaire, a new thoroughfare, cut through the château's grounds. This development culminated in the irreversible demolition of the Château des Imbergères in 1939.

The street was widened again in 1933, removing the Rue de la Lune. The entire site was repaved in the early 2020s.

== Notable buildings ==
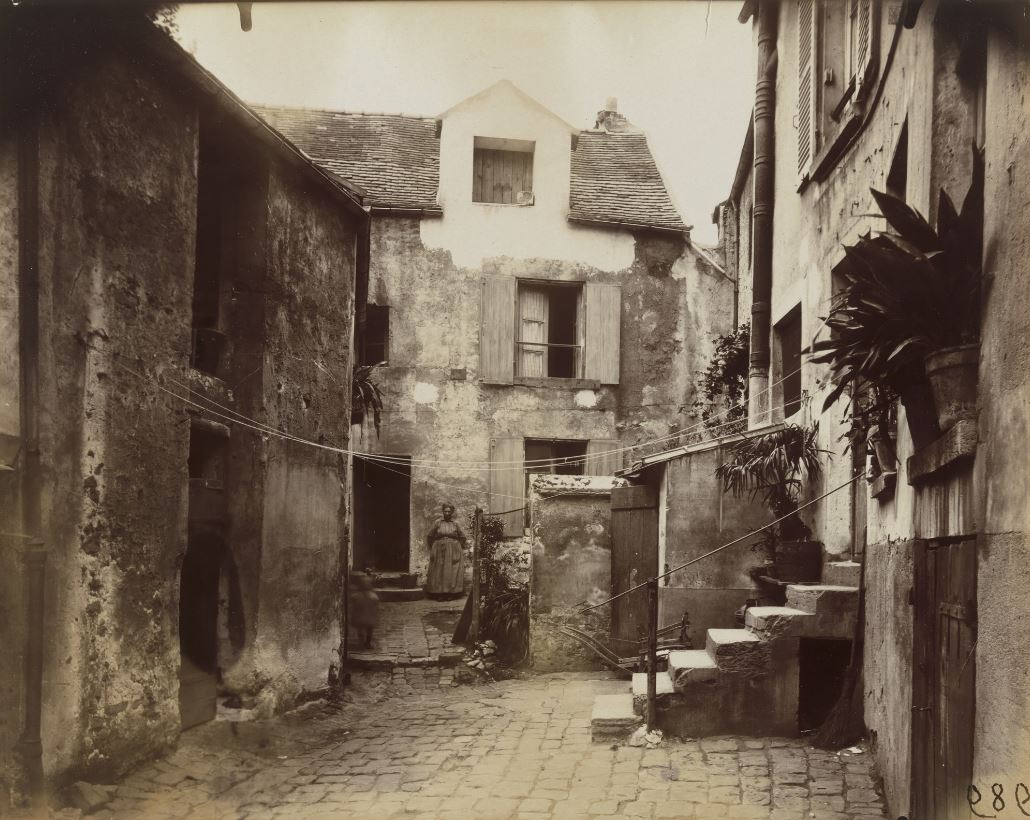
Eugène Atget : Sceaux, Rue Voltaire. Photo taken in 1922.

- Cité scolaire Marie-Curie, a school complex, built in 1929 in a building donated by the City of Paris.
- Location of the former Château des Imbergères, around no. 41.

== See also ==
- Rue de Lille (Paris)
- Rue du Pont-Neuf, Paris
