= Voltaire (given name) =

Voltaire is the given name of:

- Voltaire Volly De Faut (1904–1973), American jazz reed player
- Voltaire Gazmin (born 1944), 40th commander of the Philippine Army, lieutenant general, and Secretary of National Defense of the Republic of the Philippines
- Voltaire Molesworth (1890–1934), Australian politician
- Voltaire P. Twombly (1842–1918), American Civil War recipient of the Medal of Honor
