= Liberty Victoria =

- Abbreviation: LV
- Formation: 1936
- Founder: Brian Fitzpatrick
- Founded at: Melbourne, Victoria, Australia
- Type: Non-governmental organization
- Legal status: Incorporated association
- Purpose: Civil liberties, human rights, and free speech
- Headquarters: Melbourne, Victoria, Australia
- Region served: Victoria
- President: Gemma Cafarella
- Main organ: Committee
- Affiliations: Victorian Bar
- Website: libertyvictoria.org.au
- Formerly called: Australian Council for Civil Liberties (ACCL); Victorian Council for Civil Liberties (VCCL)

Liberty Victoria, officially the Victorian Council for Civil Liberties (VCCL) and formerly Australian Council for Civil Liberties (ACCL), is a civil liberties group based in Victoria, Australia.

== History ==
The Australian Council for Civil Liberties (ACCL) was established in Melbourne in 1936. Foundation member Brian Fitzpatrick led the organisation as general secretary until his death in 1965.

In 1966, John Tuson Bennett and Beatrice Faust launched the Victorian Council of Civil Liberties (VCCL). and Bennett served as its secretary until being expelled from the group in 1980. The new body had no ties with former council members, and no political and religious affiliations, unlike the ACCL, which was affiliated to the Labor Party. The VCCL focused largely on police matters, in particular their actions in response to protests against the Vietnam War around 1970.

Disagreements arose between conservative and radical members, and Bennett was expelled from the Labor Party, and in May 1980 the VCCL elected a new committee, without Bennett. Conflict ensued, with Bennett refusing to hand over control of the finances or membership list, and the matter went to court. While Bennett claimed to represent the VCCL, but in the same year formed a new body, the Australian Civil Liberties Union (ACLU), and became known for being one of the leading Holocaust deniers in Australia.

The council had held two fund-raising dinners in 1983 and 1984, to pay off debts incurred by legal action and to attract new members, and became an incorporated body in 1984. It underwent an organisational restructure, creating sub-committees focusing on policies such as criminal justice and minority rights. The new president was senior barrister Ron Castan QC. Gareth Evans, later Attorney General of Australia, served as vice-president for several years.

In 1984 the council supported a Human Rights Bill, which did not get passed, and in 1985 opposed the introduction of a national identity card, later called the Australia Card. It developed educational materials for secondary schools, raising ethical questions and human rights issues, and prepared written submissions to government on topics such as police powers, prisons, health and industrial affairs, as well as discussing such issues on radio.

There were organisational changes in 1990 and again in 1998, with a new constitution. In 1995, the council was rebranded as Liberty Victoria, for media appeal and to put previous internal divisions behind them.

In the 21st century came Australia's treatment of asylum seekers, the Tampa affair, the "terror laws", and the extension of police powers, partly a result of politicians' scaremongering law and order campaigns. There was another organisational overhaul in 2010.

Liberty Victoria has always been supported by the Victorian Bar, and the position of president has often been held by retired Federal Court of Australia judges and lawyers, who have included Julian Burnside, Chris Maxwell and Ron Merkel.

== Mission and functions ==
Liberty Victoria aims to defend: individuals and organisations' rights to free speech; freedom of the press; freedom of assembly; and freedom from racial, religious or political discrimination.

The organisation issues public statements and media releases, and is called upon by media and federal and state governments to debate or comment on a range of matters of public interest.

== Funding ==
Principal funding for the organisation comes from the awards dinners, and the COVID-19 pandemic in Australia caused the 2020 live awards to be cancelled, which almost led to the demise of the organisation. However, sponsors donated enough to keep it afloat.

== Voltaire Awards ==
Liberty Victoria awards its Voltaire Human Rights Awards (Voltaire Awards) to "celebrate free speech and support Liberty Victoria's continued work to defend and extend civil liberties and human rights throughout Australia". The awards are named after the 18th century French writer and philosopher known as Voltaire, known for advocating freedom of speech and civil liberties. Apart from the main Voltaire Human Rights Award, there are two additional awards, the Young Voltaire Human Rights Award (since 2017) and the Empty Chair Human Rights Award (since 2016).

The choice of recipients has attracted criticism from radio presenter Neil Mitchell, Morgan Begg of the Institute of Public Affairs, and an opinion piece in The Australian.

=== Voltaire Human Rights Award recipients ===
- 2012: David Marr, journalist
- 2013: Arnold Zable, writer and refugee advocate
- 2014: Yu Shu Lipski, interpreter and whistleblower
- 2015: Peter Greste, Baher Mohamed and Mohamed Fahmy, Al Jazeera journalists detained in Egypt from 2013 to 2015
- 2016: Waleed Aly, academic, author, radio and TV presenter
- 2017: Gillian Triggs
- 2018: Magda Szubanski, actor and advocate for same sex marriage in Australia
- 2019: Debbie Kilroy, prison reformer and founder of Sisters Inside
- 2020: Dylan Alcott, disability advocate
- 2021: the children of Tanya Day, who died in custody
- 2022: Brenda Appleton, trans rights advocate
- 2023: Sophie Trevitt, lawyer and advocate for raising the age of criminal responsibility

=== Young Voltaire Human Rights Award recipients ===
- 2018: Yassmin Abdel-Magied
- 2020: Dujuan Hoosan (who featured in the documentary film In My Blood It Runs), advocate for increasing the age of criminal responsibility from 10 to 14 and improving education for Indigenous Australian children
- 2021: Mohamed Semra
- 2022: Sitarah Mohammadi and Sajjad Askary (Joint Recipients), members of the Action for Afghanistan campaign

=== Empty Chair Human Rights Award ===
- 2020: Bernard Collaery and Witness J, joint award
- 2021: accepted by Craig Foster and Mostafar Azimitibar
- 2022: Mehdi Ali, a refugee from Iran who had been held in detention by Australia since 2013

== Notable activities ==
In January 2021 Liberty Victoria opposed border closures in Australia in response to the COVID-19 pandemic in Australia. It also objected after Facebook briefly included a number of philanthropic organisations in its sweeping ban of Australian-based publishers, in response to the Morrison government's proposed media bargaining laws in February 2021.
