= Fredrick Töben =

Australian Holocaust denier (1944–2020)

- Born: Gerald Fredrick Töben; 2 June 1944; Jaderberg, Oldenburg, Germany
- Died: 29 June 2020 (aged 76)
- Known for: Founder of the Adelaide Institute, a Holocaust denial group in Australia, conviction for breaching Germany's Holocaust Law

Gerald Fredrick Töben (2 June 1944 – 29 June 2020) was a German-born Australian citizen who was director and founder of the Adelaide Institute, a Holocaust denial group in Australia. He was the author of works on education, political science, and history.

In 1998, Töben was arrested and imprisoned for nine months in Mannheim Prison for breaching Germany's Holocaust Law (§ 130 public incitement) prohibiting anyone from defaming the dead. Töben wrote of his work: "If you wish to begin to doubt the Holocaust-Shoah narrative, you must be prepared for personal sacrifice, must be prepared for marriage and family break-up, loss of career, and go to prison." In the past he denied that he said that the Holocaust was a "lie".

Involved in a number of controversies and court actions, Töben served three jail sentences: in 1999, for seven months in Germany for breaching Germany's Holocaust Law, Section 130, that outlaws "Incitement to hatred"; in 2008, for 50 days in the United Kingdom when he was transiting through Heathrow and Germany wanted him extradited under a European Arrest Warrant, which the court declared invalid; and in 2009, for three months in South Australia for contempt of court, for which he apologised to the court.

== Early life and career ==
Töben was born in Jaderberg, Germany, on 2 June 1944. In 1954, when he was ten years old, his family migrated with Töben to Australia. He studied at Victoria University of Wellington BA (1968) in New Zealand, and at Melbourne University BA (1970) in Australia, later earning a D Phil (1977) from Stuttgart University, and a Grad Cert Ed (1978) from the University of Rhodesia.

Töben taught at secondary level at Leongatha, Kings Park, St. Arnaud, and Goroke, and tertiary level at the Warrnambool Institute of Advanced Education (now a part of Deakin University), Victoria. During 1981–82 he lectured at the Advanced College of Education, Minna, Nigeria.

From 1980 to 1985, Töben worked as a temporary employee for the Victorian Department of Education and Training until his dismissal for incompetence and disobedience on 4 January 1985.

He gained local, state and national prominence with his dismissal. Instead of opting for unemployment he drove a school bus from 1985 to 1988 thus becoming "Australia's most highly qualified school bus driver". Töben was heavily involved in Goroke's Centenary of Education celebrations, selling the book he compiled for the occasion.

Töben won his case against dismissal in the County Court and his appeal in the Supreme Court of Victoria, mitigating his own damages.

== Views on the Holocaust ==
Töben rejected what he called the "official conspiracy theory" that Germans systematically exterminated European Jewry. Töben stated that "the current U.S. government is influenced by world Zionist considerations to retain the survival of the European colonial, apartheid, Zionist, racist entity of Israel".

== Töben and the Racial Discrimination Act 1975 (Cth) ==
=== 1994: Adelaide Institute ===
In 1994, Töben established the Adelaide Institute, which he directed until 2009. Töben and his associates at the Adelaide Institute denied "being Holocaust deniers" in interviews conducted by Australian media, claiming they cannot deny that which never happened.

=== 2000: HREOC determination ===
On 10 October 2000, the Australian Human Rights and Equal Opportunity Commission (HREOC) found that Töben had engaged in unlawful conduct in contravention of s 18C of the Racial Discrimination Act 1975 (Cth) in publishing material that was racially vilificatory of Jewish people on the Adelaide Institute website. Töben was ordered to remove the contents of the Adelaide Institute website from the internet and not to re-publish the content of that website in public elsewhere. He was also ordered to make a statement of apology.

=== 2002: Federal Court orders ===
An application was made to the Federal Court of Australia to enforce the 2000 HREOC determinations. On 17 September 2002, the Federal Court (in Jones v Toben [2002] FCA 1150) noted that since the HREOC determination, considerable material of the same general character as that which was the subject of the complaint to HREOC had been published by Töben both online and in the form of newsletters. The Court ordered Töben to remove from the Adelaide Institute and all other websites of the vilificatory material and any other material with substantially similar content or which conveyed any of a number of the imputations found to have been conveyed by that material. On appeal (in Toben v Jones (2003) 129 FCR 515), the Court affirmed the application of the Racial Discrimination Act 1975 against the statements on Töben's website.

=== 2009: Contempt of Court ===
In 2009, Jeremy Jones, the then President of the Executive Council of Australian Jewry, brought a contempt of court action against Töben arising from Federal Court orders of 2002 requiring Töben to remove material from his Adelaide Institute website that vilifies Jewish people, and to refrain from publishing further similar material. Töben was found guilty of 24 charges of contempt of court by not following the ruling despite his 2007 apology. Though Töben unreservedly apologised for his breaches of court orders and said he would not withdraw his apology as he had in the past, he was sentenced to 3 months in prison.

He appealed against the sentence, but on 13 August 2009 the Full Court of the Federal Court rejected his appeal, and he started his 3-month jail sentence, one week in maximum security-punishment block – first at Yatala Labour Prison, and later at Cadell Training Centre, a low security prison farm. He was released on 12 November 2009.

=== 2012: Action for costs and bankruptcy ===
In 2012, Jones sought his court costs of more than $175,000 from Töben arising from the 2002 and 2009 cases. Töben pleaded that he had no money, and the Federal Magistrates Court declared Töben bankrupt and his passport was confiscated.

=== 2013: Defamation action ===
In 2013, Töben commenced a defamation action against Nationwide News (Toben v Nationwide News Pty Ltd [2016] NSWCA 296) alleging that an article published by them conveyed a number of defamatory imputations about him, including that he was a "Holocaust denier" and an anti-Semite. The newspaper claimed that Töben's purpose in bringing the proceedings was not to vindicate his reputation but, rather, to use the proceedings to express his views as to the Holocaust. Töben admitted that as the purpose of the action, and the action was dismissed.

=== 2014: Views on Racial Discrimination Act ===
In May 2014, Töben strongly backed the Abbott government's plans to water down Australia's race hate laws, describing them as a welcome challenge to "Jewish supremacism" in Australia, and describing section 18C of the Racial Discrimination Act as a "flawed law, which only benefits Jewish-Zionist-Israeli interests".

== Other activities ==
=== Imprisonment ===
In 1998, Töben was arrested in Germany for breaching Germany's Holocaust Law, Section 130, that outlaws "Incitement to hatred". He was sentenced in April 1999 to 10 months in prison, but had already served seven months during trial, and was released upon payment of a $5000 bond-Kaution.

=== Holocaust-denial conferences ===
Töben visited Iran in 2003 to give a speech denying the Holocaust. In 2005 in an interview with Iranian state television he indicated that it was his belief that "Israel is founded on the Holocaust lie." In December 2006, Töben took part in the International Conference to Review the Global Vision of the Holocaust, a Holocaust denial conference in Tehran sponsored by the Iranian regime of Mahmoud Ahmadinejad.

=== 2008 extradition attempt ===
In 2008, the German federal authorities attempted unsuccessfully to extradite Töben from the United Kingdom under a European arrest warrant for allegedly publishing "antisemitic and/or revisionist" material on his website, which he writes from his home in Australia, and is a crime that does not exist in Britain. The European Arrest Warrant had three boxes ticked: racism, xenophobia and cybercrime, which did not fulfill British legal requirements and so the EAW was judged to be deficient. On 1 October 2008, Töben was detained at Heathrow Airport while flying from the United States to Dubai. In Westminster Magistrates' Court the next day, he objected to the terms of the warrant, claiming that he was protected by the terms of the Schengen agreement and said that his historical and political views had motivated the German authorities' decision to issue the warrant.

The arrest warrant was dismissed by Westminster Magistrates' Court on 29 October 2008, with the judge stating that the details it contained were "sparse". According to Ben Watson, Töben's barrister instructed by extradition solicitor Kevin Lowry-Mullins, the court was unable to decide whether the warrant was valid because it did not specify whether any part of the crime took part in the United Kingdom and there was not sufficient information about the nature of Töben's alleged crime. The warrant spoke of "worldwide Internet publications" but for it to be valid, it would have been necessary for the German authorities to have shown that the offence not only took place in Germany but that it did not take place in the United Kingdom. Töben was offered bail, pending an appeal by the German prosecuting authorities to the High Court. Strict conditions were set, including limitations on Töben's communication and travel and he was able to raise the £100,000 surety required – 3 individuals offered to post bail, but an Executive Order released him from prison.

The German authorities later withdrew their appeal, after the Crown Prosecution Service advised them that in the light of further information they had provided about the location of the alleged offence, it would not have been possible to satisfy the courts that the offence was extraditable. This is because under common law it is not an offence to express an opinion, as is the case in countries where Holocaust denial is criminalised. The German authorities later stated their intention to attempt to extradite Töben from other jurisdictions in the future.

The case caused some controversy in the United Kingdom, with the Liberal Democrats' home affairs spokesman Chris Huhne expressing concerns that the extradition would amount to an infringement on the freedom of speech. Also, British historian Geoffrey Alderman criticised Töben's arrest and the tendency "to enforce particular interpretations of history under the guise of 'combating racism and xenophobia'". According to Alderman, "the task of the historian is to investigate, confront, challenge and, if necessary, correct society's collective memory. In this process, the state ought to have no role whatever, none at all. Certainly not in the UK, which delights in presenting itself as a bastion of academic freedom."

== See also ==
- Genocide denial
- Historical denial
