= Faurisson affair =

1980s academic controversy regarding freedom of speech

The Faurisson affair was an academic controversy following publication of a book, Mémoire en défense (1980), by French professor Robert Faurisson, a Holocaust denier, and the inclusion of an essay by American linguist Noam Chomsky, entitled "Some Elementary Comments on the Rights of Freedom of Expression", as an introduction to Faurisson's book.

Faurisson has since been convicted under French law for his Holocaust denial on several occasions, including in October 2006, when he was sentenced to a three-month suspended sentence by the Paris correctional court, for denying the Holocaust on an Iranian TV channel.

The Faurisson affair damaged Chomsky's reputation in France, a country he did not visit for almost thirty years following the affair. Translation of his political writings into French was delayed until the 2000s.

== Faurisson's letters to Le Monde ==
In December 1978 and January 1979, Robert Faurisson, a French professor of literature at the University of Lyon, published two letters in Le Monde claiming that the gas chambers used by the Nazis to exterminate the Jews had not existed.

As a result of a TV interview, he was found guilty of defamation and incitement to racial hatred and given a suspended 3-month prison term, and a 21,000-franc (€3,200) fine. In addition he was ordered to pay for the reproduction of the judgement in national newspapers and television. This latter requirement was dropped after he appealed.

== Petition signed by Chomsky ==
In the fall of 1979, American scholar Noam Chomsky contributed his name to a petition—signed by roughly 600 people, many disgraced academics, including Holocaust deniers Serge Thion, Arthur Butz, John Tuson Bennett and Mark Weber—concerning the affair:

Dr. Robert Faurisson has served as a respected professor of twentieth-century French literature and document criticism for over four years at the University of Lyon-2 in France. Since 1974 he has been conducting extensive historical research into the "Holocaust" question.

Since he began making his findings public, Professor Faurisson has been subject to a vicious campaign of harassment, intimidation, slander and physical violence in a crude attempt to silence him. Fearful officials have even tried to stop him from further research by denying him access to public libraries and archives.

We strongly protest these efforts to deprive Professor Faurisson of his freedom of speech and expression, and we condemn the shameful campaign to silence him.

We strongly support Professor Faurisson's just right of academic freedom and we demand that university and government officials do everything possible to ensure his safety and the free exercise of his legal rights.

A number of French intellectuals criticized Chomsky's signing of the petition, describing the extent of Faurisson's Holocaust denial and his ties to neo-Nazi groups. In particular, Pierre Vidal-Naquet criticized the wording of the petition as "scandalous", saying that it implied Faurisson was a serious researcher and not a forger:

What is scandalous about the petition is that it never raises the question of whether what Faurisson is saying is true or false, that it even presents his conclusions or "findings" as the result of a historical investigation, one, that is, in quest of the truth. To be sure, it may be argued that every man has a right to lies and falsehood, and that individual freedom entails that right, which is accorded, in the French liberal tradition, to the accused for his defence. But the right that the forger demands should not be conceded to him in the name of truth.

Vidal-Naquet said that Faurisson was not barred from access to public libraries or archives, and the only archive to ban him was the private Centre de Documentation Juive Contemporaine (Center for Contemporary Jewish Documentation) in Paris. Vidal-Naquet believed that decision was entirely consistent with its declared mission, "the fact that the staff of the Centre de Documentation Juive Contemporaine, challenged in its fundamental activity, that of the memory of the crime, should --after years of forbearance-- refuse to serve Faurisson seems perfectly normal to me".

== Preface to Mémoire en défense ==
Chomsky subsequently wrote an essay entitled Some Elementary Comments on the Rights of Freedom of Expression, in which he attacked his critics for failing to respect the principle of freedom of speech. Chomsky wrote:

Let me add a final remark about Faurisson's alleged "anti-Semitism". Note first that even if Faurisson were to be a rabid anti-Semite and fanatic pro-Nazi—such charges have been presented to me in private correspondence that it would be improper to cite in detail here—this would have no bearing whatsoever on the legitimacy of the defense of his civil rights. On the contrary, it would make it all the more imperative to defend them since, once again, it has been a truism for years, indeed centuries, that it is precisely in the case of horrendous ideas that the right of free expression must be most vigorously defended; it is easy enough to defend free expression for those who require no such defense. Putting this central issue aside, is it true that Faurisson is an anti-Semite or a neo-Nazi? As noted earlier, I do not know his work very well. But from what I have read—largely as a result of the nature of the attacks on him—I find no evidence to support either conclusion. Nor do I find credible evidence in the material that I have read concerning him, either in the public record or in private correspondence. As far as I can determine, he is a relatively apolitical liberal of some sort.

Chomsky granted permission for the essay to be used for any purpose. Serge Thion and Pierre Guillaume used it in 1980 as a preface when publishing a book by Faurisson, without Chomsky's knowledge. Later Chomsky requested that the essay not be used in this manner, since he believed the French intellectual community was so incapable of understanding freedom of speech that it would only confuse them further, but his request came too late for the book to be changed. Chomsky subsequently said that asking for the preface to be removed is his one regret in the matter.

Chomsky's essay sparked an even greater controversy. Critics such as Pierre Vidal-Naquet attacked him for defending Faurisson personally against charges of antisemitism and upholding his work as historical inquiry:

The simple truth, Noam Chomsky, is that you were unable to abide by the ethical maxim you had imposed. You had the right to say: my worst enemy has the right to be free, on condition that he not ask for my death or that of my brothers. You did not have the right to say: my worst enemy is a comrade, or a "relatively apolitical sort of liberal". You did not have the right to take a falsifier of history and to recast him in the colors of truth.

Vidal-Naquet offered the following argument to substantiate his characterization of Faurisson as an antisemite:

I shall simply say: Faurisson's personal anti-Semitism, in fact, interests me rather little. It exists and I can testify to it, but it is nothing compared with the anti-Semitism of his texts. Is it anti-Semitic to write with consummate calm that in requiring Jews to wear the yellow star starting at the age of six "Hitler was perhaps less concerned with the Jewish question than with ensuring the safety of German soldiers"? Certainly not, within Faurisson's logic, since in the final analysis there is no practical anti-Semitism possible. But within Chomsky's logic? Is the invention of an imaginary declaration of war against Hitler, in the name of the international Jewish community, by an imaginary president of the World Jewish Congress, a case of anti-Semitism or of deliberate falsification?

John Goldsmith writes that "Unsympathetic critics used it as an opportunity to brand Chomsky with anti-Semitic labels, but even critics potentially sympathetic to Chomsky's political views felt his remarks showed lack of judgment."

Other critics held that Faurisson's statements were the archetype of antisemitism, and that the logical conclusion of Chomsky's statement would be that Nazism was not antisemitic. The main argument for this is that Holocaust deniers are not interested in truth, but "motivated by racism, extremism, and virulent anti-Semitism".

== Chomsky's response ==
Responding to a request for comment, Chomsky doubled down, arguing that Faurisson's right to express and publish his opinions on the grounds that freedom of speech must be extended to all viewpoints. The affair generated controversy among scholars both in France and the United States.

In a response to a letter circa 1989–1991, Chomsky said:

A professor of French literature was suspended from teaching on grounds that he could not be protected from violence, after privately printing pamphlets questioning the existence of gas chambers. He was then brought to trial for "falsification of History", and later condemned for this crime, the first time that a modern Western state openly affirmed the Stalinist-Nazi doctrine that the state will determine historical truth and punish deviation from it. Later he was beaten practically to death by Jewish terrorists. As of now, the European and other intellectuals have not expressed any opposition to these scandals; rather, they have sought to disguise their profound commitment to Stalinist-Nazi doctrine by following the same models, trying to divert attention with a flood of outrageous lies.

In "His Right to Say It", published in The Nation, Chomsky stressed the conceptual distinction between endorsing someone's view and defending his right to say it:

Vidal-Naquet misunderstood a sentence in the petition that ran, "Since he began making his findings public, Professor Faurisson has been subject to...." The term "findings" is quite neutral. One can say, without contradiction: "He made his findings public and they were judged worthless, irrelevant, falsified...." The petition implied nothing about quality of Faurisson's work, which was irrelevant to the issues raised. [...]

I made it explicit that I would not discuss Faurisson's work, having only limited familiarity with it (and, frankly, little interest in it). Rather, I restricted myself to the civil-liberties issues and the implications of the fact that it was even necessary to recall Voltaire's famous words in a letter to M. le Riche: "I detest what you write, but I would give my life to make it possible for you to continue to write." [...] Many writers find it scandalous that I should support the right of free expression for Faurisson without carefully analyzing his work, a strange doctrine which, if adopted, would effectively block defense of civil rights for unpopular views. [...]

It seems to me something of a scandal that it is even necessary to debate these issues two centuries after Voltaire defended the right of free expression for views he detested. It is a poor service to the memory of the victims of the Holocaust to adopt a central doctrine of their murderers.

Chomsky's defense was attacked in turn. Critics said that his defense went beyond free speech arguments, and that it included a defense of Faurisson's "work".

== Chomsky's biographers on the Faurisson affair ==
Chomsky's biographers have expressed a range of views on the Faurisson affair. In Chomsky: Ideas and ideals, Neil Smith writes: 'Chomsky should perhaps have foreseen the negative effect of his activity and refrained from writing the way he did. Perhaps, but on balance perhaps not. Even had he seen the furore which would erupt and the degree that would ensue, the moral doctrine of defending freedom of speech is probably higher.'

In Noam Chomsky: A Life of Dissent, Robert Barsky says 'Chomsky's tactics may not always be the most appropriate in light of the causes that he supports but the values transmitted by his work are, according to virtually any reasonable measure, consistent with those of the libertarians.' Barsky also points out that although the Faurisson affair 'has had a harmful and lasting effect on Chomsky. ... Chomsky has refused to back down on the issue, even refusing to admit a momentary lack of judgment.'

Two other biographers, Milan Rai and Chris Knight, both refer to the Faurisson affair in the context of Chomsky's uncompromising support for academic freedom for everyone including 'war criminals'. In Chomsky's Politics, Milan Rai quotes Chomsky saying that he even 'supported the rights of American war criminals not only to speak and teach but also to conduct their research, on grounds of academic freedom, at a time when their work was being used to murder and destroy.'

In Decoding Chomsky, Chris Knight refers to Chomsky's 1969 threat to 'protest publicly' if fellow Massachusetts Institute of Technology (MIT) academic Walt Whitman Rostow was denied a position at the university. Chomsky certainly considered Rostow, a prime architect of the Vietnam War, as a 'war criminal' but insisted that MIT must stick to its principles of academic freedom – principles expressed when MIT's President Howard Wesley Johnson stated that the university should be a 'refuge from the censor, where any individual can pursue truth as he sees it, without any interference.' Johnson's motivation for talking about academic freedom at this time of anti-war student unrest was largely to prevent any interference with MIT's various military-funded research laboratories. But, Knight claims, Chomsky also believed he had to extend the principle of academic freedom to unusual lengths because any 'less libertarian policy might have undermined his own conflicted position as an anti-war campaigner working in a laboratory funded by the US military.' Knight concludes that Chomsky's subsequent position on Faurisson 'did not imply any sympathy towards Holocaust denial. It was simply a logical extension of a principle common to all Western universities – one which his management at MIT felt obliged to uphold with special tenacity in view of what its own researchers were doing.'

Paul Berman, writing in Tablet in 2018, says that Chomsky's biographers have largely accepted his claim that his defense of Faurisson was entirely on free speech grounds, and that Chomsky did not defend Faurisson's actual positions or arguments. Berman, however, argues that Chomsky did in fact defend Faurisson substantively. Berman says that Chomsky adopted an "oddly respectful tone toward Faurisson" and that he "left the clear implication that Faurisson is a scientific-minded researcher, with conclusions or findings that ought to be accorded the kind of respect that is accorded to any authentically scientific researcher."
