= La Guerre Sociale =

La Guerre Sociale was an ultra-left journal appearing in France from 1977 to 1985. It attracted controversy over its support for negationism.

The leading spirit was Dominique Blanc. He had previously been involved in the Organisation des Jeunes Travailleurs Révolutionnaires (OJTR) during the early 1970s. Originally inspired by the Situationist International, the OJTR was later influenced by left communism. A milieu had developed around the bookshop La Vieille Taupe which sought to reconcile the views of the German and Italian left communists. The group Le Mouvement Communiste had emerged from these circles.

In 1972 OJTR published the text Militantisme, stade suprême de l'aliénation. They also produced texts under the name Quatre Millions de Jeune Travailleurs, taking the name from a 1971 youth publication of the Parti Socialiste Unifié - a French Socialist Party. During 1974 OJTR organised a national conference but disappeared shortly afterwards. However the text Un Monde Sans Argent emerged from the remains of the group. It was published as three pamphlets by the 'Les Amis de 4 Millions de Jeunes Travailleur' between 1975–76.

By 1976 Dominique Blanc had published a journal called King Kong International with former members of the OJTR, Le Mouvement Communiste and the milieu around La Vieille Taupe. The following year essentially the same grouping produced the first issue of La Guerre Sociale.

The text 'De l'exploitation dans les camps à l'exploitation des camps' appeared in GS#3 in 1979. This tackled the concentration camp system and its subsequent ideological use. It made extensive use of the work of Paul Rassinier, a lifelong pacifist whose political trajectory had taken him through being a left-oppositionist, socialist deputy and by the 1950s a member of the Anarchist Federation. He had been interned in German labour camps during the war for his resistance activities. He subsequently wrote several books challenging other accounts of the concentration camps. In the course of this he moved from scepticism about the existence of extermination camps as opposed to labour camps, to denial of the scale of the holocaust. Although GS appreciated the visceral anti-Stalinism in Rassinier's writings, such as his accusations that Communist Party members collaborated in the functioning of the camps, they 'failed' to mention that Rassinier was equally antisemitic.

Extracts from the article were used on a wall poster titled Qui est le juif ?(Who is the Jew?), which Guerre Sociale published in defence of Robert Faurisson, at the time an obscure professor of literature with a taste for controversy. He claimed he was being 'persecuted' for declaring that the gas chambers had not existed. Faurisson's alleged 'victimisation' by opponents of his views was compared through the title of this wall poster to the victimisation of Jews. This was the beginning of ultra-left negationionism.

The mentor of this phenomenon was Pierre Guillaume, a former member of Socialisme ou Barbarie and Pouvoir Ouvrier who in 1965 had founded the bookshop La Vieille Taupe. Until its closure in 1972 it provided a home to a section of the ultra-left milieu in Paris. By 1978, several years after the bookshop had closed, Guillaume became infatuated with Faurisson and revived the name La Vieille Taupe for a publishing house devoted to negationism. He soon became the principal negationist publisher in France. However although Guillaume was the messenger, La Guerre Sociale were the prime movers in disseminating Holocaust denial amongst the French ultra-left in the early 1980s.
