= Serge July =

French journalist (born 1942)

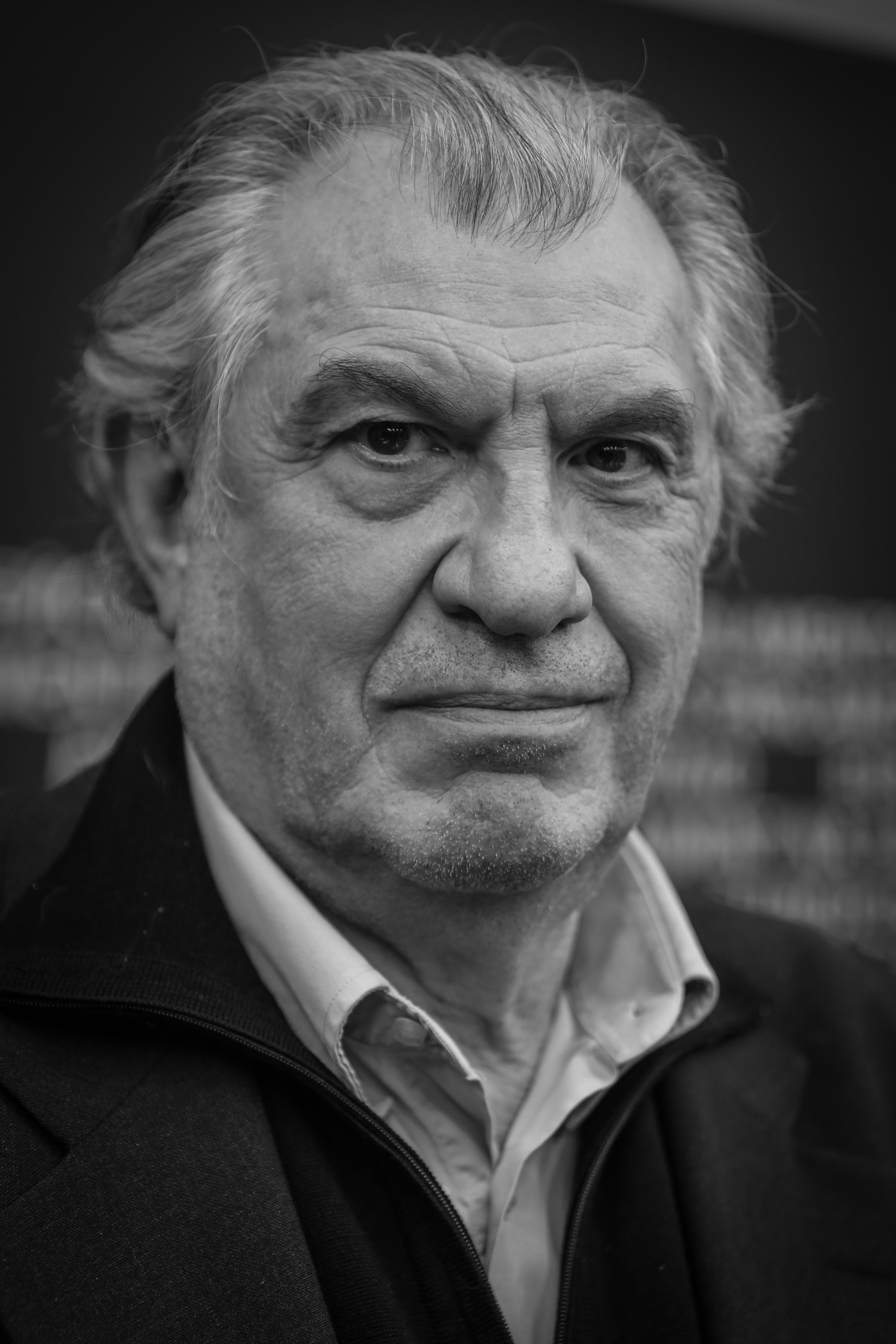
- Serge July by Claude Truong-Ngoc, 2014
- Born: 27 December 1942 (age 83); Paris, France
- Occupations: Journalist; Editor; Writer; Director; Script writer
- Known for: Founder of Libération

Serge July (French pronunciation: [sɛʁʒ ʒyli]; born 27 December 1942) is a French journalist, editor, founder of the daily Libération, and a prominent figure in French politics from the 1970s through the 1990s. He is the author of several books and has directed more than fifty documentaries about cinema and politics. In recent times, he has been active in French organizations working in support of journalists taken hostage in Syria.

== Critics ==
In 1978, he published an article criticizing the television series Holocaust, invited Pierre Guillaume, negationist founder of the bookstore, La Vieille Taupe and supports the freedom of speech of Robert Faurisson. On 4 July 1983 he was condemned by the 17th chamber of the Paris judicial tribunal, following the complaint of the International League against Racism and Anti-Semitism (LICRA), of having published in a "Courrier readers" of 31 July 1982, an anti-Semitic letter, accused of defamation, incitement to hatred and racial violence.

== Works ==
- (with Alain Geismar) Vers la guerre civile, 1969
- Les années Mitterrand : histoire baroque d'une normalisation inachevée, 1986
- Le salon des artistes, 1989
- Dictionnaire amoureux de New York, 2019
