= Auschwitz or the great alibi =

1960 magazine article

"Auschwitz or the great alibi" (French: Auschwitz ou le grand alibi) is a 1960 article published in Programme communiste, the French magazine of the International Communist Party (ICP), later reedited in the form of a brochure. The authorship of this text has been attributed to both Amadeo Bordiga and Martin Axelrad. However, the Programme communiste was a Bordigist (edited by disciples of Amadeo Bordiga) revue, publishing its texts anonymously in order to emphasize its character of a collective work.

The work is seen by some scholars^{[Who?]} as the founding text of left-wing Holocaust denial. Even though the text asserts that the genocide was real, an attempt to recontextualize it by Holocaust denialists in the 1990s has led to its characterization as a denialist text, with antisemitic publications making use of the work to support the argument that the Auschwitz concentration camp could not have been created as an extermination camp because the bourgeoisie cannot act without a profit motive and therefore this was a labor camp in which members of the middle class exploited and exterminated other members of the middle class, thereby enabling capitalists to accumulate wealth.

== Author ==
The article was published in issue 11, dated April–June 1960, of the Programme communiste, organ of the ICP. The article starts out with a critique of a poster published by the MRAP and largely supports its argument on the book The History of Joel Brand. It was at first published in French, referring to a French context, which in itself made the attribution to the Italian communist Amadeo Bordiga problematic. According to an article in 2010 in Le Prolétaire, organ of the ICP, its author was in fact Martin Axelrad, a militant French Bordigist of Austrian Jewish origin whose family fled to France after the Anschluss.

== Thesis ==
According to the author, or authors, of this article, the Nazis did not exterminate the Jews because they were Jews, but because they were an important group within the petite bourgeoisie, a social class condemned to disappear by the concentration of capital; and antisemitism in its modern form developed within that same petite bourgeoisie in an attempt to preserve itself as a class by sacrificing a particular part of itself. Concentrated German capital interests, when confronted with the economic crisis, it is claimed, saw this development as a windfall: "It could liquidate part of its petite bourgeoisie with the consent of the petite bourgeoisie, or even better, have the petite bourgeoisie itself take charge of this liquidation". Thus, according to the author(s), antisemitism was determined by socioeconomic conditions:

Under horrible economic pressure, menaced by a diffuse destruction that made the very existence of its members uncertain, the petite bourgeoisie reacted with sacrificing part of itself, expecting in this way to save its other members. Thus, antisemitism did not originate in any "machiavellian plan" or "perverse ideas": It was a direct result of economic constraint. Hatred of the Jews, far from being the a priori reason for their destruction, was but the expression of a desire to delimit and concentrate the destruction on them.

The article refers to Adolf Eichmann's offer to "sell a million Jews" as related by the American relief worker Joel Brand to support the claim that the Nazis at first tried to get rid of the Jewish population by expelling them and that no other countries were prepared to receive them as these other countries were confronted with the same problems concerning their petite bourgeoisie. As the war aggravated the whole situation, the concentrated capital forces of Germany ended up organising the extermination of the Jews.

The phrase "Auschwitz or the great alibi" refers to the more specific claim that after the war the Holocaust was made use of in order to demobilize the working class as part of a propaganda effort establishing a belief that the "antifascist democracies" were of an entirely different nature from fascism, making the working class forget, by being exposed to the relics of the extermination, that these were in fact the outcome of the same logic of capitalism that they themselves also were obeying. In this perspective, the exhortations to fight fascism in the name of democracy were in fact a lure destined to make the proletariat forget that their true enemy is and continues to be the capitalist system: It is in this sense that "Nazi barbarism" would be the "great alibi" of the capitalist democracies.

== Reception ==
The theses of Auschwitz or the great alibi have been contested by several leftist organisations, especially those with a main objective of fighting neo-fascism. On the other hand, the activist Pierre Guillaume, an adherent of Socialisme ou Barbarie, later with the Pouvoir ouvrier, referred to this text as part of a first stage that later led him to support negationism (disavowed by the ICP). This has made some say (notably Daniel Lindenberg, Valérie Igounet and in a more measured way Pierre Vidal-Naquet) that this brochure was the founding text of left-wing negationism:

The article entitled "Auschwitz or the Great Alibi" in no way denies the genocide perpetrated by the Nazis but does, on the contrary, propose a very mechanical thesis. The republication of this article as a booklet by La Vieille Taupe in 1979 may be considered the debut of the negationist affair within the milieu of the ultra-left".

This interpretation has been vividly contested by the ICP itself, whilst denying the singularity of Nazi crimes and the Nazi ideology of the Third Reich, preferring to explain the genocide against the Jews by a socioeconomic materialist analysis:

For, it is true, we do deny that "the crimes of Nazism remains historically unique" [...]. Just think of the massacring of the Tutsis of Rwanda, remembering the criminal complicity of French imperialism in the preparations for these mass killings. [...] At the roots of those crimes one finds the Capitalist system itself.

== See also ==
- Holocaust uniqueness debate

== Bibliography ==
- Michel Dreyfus (2011). L'antisémitisme à gauche, histoire d'un paradoxe. La découverte. 345 p.
- Valérie Igounet (2000). Histoire du négationnisme en France. Paris. 691 p.
- Pierre Vidal-Naquet (1987). Les Assassins de la mémoire : Un Eichmann de papier » et autres essais sur le révisionnisme. Paris: La Découverte. 227 p.
- Enzo Traverso (1999). Understanding The Nazi Genocide: Marxism After Auschwitz. Pluto Press. 164 p.
