= The Holocaust History Project =

Inactive history organization

- Logo of the Holocaust History Project (2007)
- Type: Non-profit corporation
- Headquarters: San Antonio, Texas
- Region served: Worldwide
- Members: Inactive
- Staff: THHP Team
- Website: Archived website

The Holocaust History Project (THHP) is an inactive non-profit corporation based in San Antonio, Texas. Its archived website offers a comprehensive selection of documents, recordings, photographs, and essays regarding the Holocaust, Holocaust denial, and antisemitism. The project became known for its refutations of the Leuchter report and the Rudolf report. Since then, it has assisted the defense in the case of Irving v. Lipstadt. As of 2016, THHP website is no longer available online but all of its contents are accessible via several hundred captures in the Internet Archive. However starting April 2016 the French NGO and project phdn.org has put back online an almost complete copy of the original THHP website.

The THHP defines itself as an organization of "concerned individuals working together to educate and inform people about the Holocaust." Some of its members remain anonymous. The founding director was Harry W. Mazal, OBE, who died in 2011.

Among the material which is presented, there are essays about scientific and legal analyses, events and people, expert witness testimony, original Nazi documents, transcripts of many of the Nuremberg trials, and the complete texts of two influential works, Jean-Claude Pressac's Auschwitz: Technique and Operation of the Gas Chambers and Robert Jay Lifton's The Nazi Doctors. There are also extensive sections on the Auschwitz and Operation Reinhard extermination camps.

More than 20 "short essays" address a variety of questions of interest, including an extensive bibliography of literature about Holocaust related topics. It also contains a section which is devoted to Holocaust denial, including direct debunking of deniers such as David Irving, Ernst Zündel, and several others.

== Members ==
- Mikkel Andersson, information technology consultant
- Yale F. Edeiken, attorney
- Richard J. Green, Ph.D., physical chemist
- Patrick J. Groff, computer scientist
- Ralf Loserth, computer scientist
- Andrew E. Mathis, Ph.D., adjunct professor of humanities (including Holocaust), University of the Sciences
- Harry W. Mazal, chemist
- Jamie McCarthy, computer scientist
- Gord McFee, historian and scholar of German history and literature
- Danny Mittleman, associate professor of information systems, DePaul University
- Sara Salzman, marketing consultant
- Nicholas Terry, Ph.D., lecturer in history, University of Exeter
- John Zimmerman, associate professor of accounting, business and economics, University of Nevada Las Vegas
