= Alain Guionnet =

French Holocaust denier

Alain Guionnet (born 22 April 1954) is a French Holocaust denier.

== Education ==
Born on 22 April 1954 in the 14th arrondissement of Paris, Alain Guionnet received a bachelor's degree in economical and social administration and master's degrees in history and Hungarian.

== Activism ==
According to Christophe Bourseiller, during Guionnet's youth, he led a far-left group called Oser lutter, oser vaincre ("Dare to struggle, dare to beat"), based in Issy-les-Moulineaux. Together with Pierre Guillaume, he also founded and contributed to the leftist newspaper La Guerre sociale. He wrote a "Letter to Guy Debord" that has been archived by the latter in his "Lettres reçues" (received letters).

In 1988, he published Josef Kramer vs. Josef Kramer, a pastiche of the movie Kramer vs Kramer, on former commandant of Bergen-Belsen concentration camp and Natzweiler-Struthof concentration camp Josef Kramer's trial through a book.

After having collaborated on a revisionist magazine, in 1989 he founded his own, titled Revision, which publishes anti-Masonic and antisemitic articles and texts including The Protocols of the Elders of Zion and some articles by Robert Faurisson. The ninth volume reprinted Élie Reclus's article against circumcision. In the same time, he founded the Association contre la mutilation des enfants (A.M.E.), together with Xavier Valla. Michel Erlich, a psychiatrist, categorized Revision as "[a vehicle of] delirious antiSemitism"; Guionnet hawked his magazine at Front National conventions. He published Revision until 2009.

Guionnet was sentenced to jail several times (in 1991, 1993 and 1994) for violations of the Gayssot Act, i.e., denying the Holocaust. He was also sentenced for defamation toward Pierre Vidal-Naquet.

== Books ==
Guionnet has written three books published under various pseudonyms:

- "Jacques Moulin", Le Mode de production des hommes-plantes (The Mode of Production of Plantmen), Issy-les-Moulineaux, A. Guionnet, 1980, 177 p. (BnF 366012528)
- "L'Aigle noir", Josef Kramer contre Josef Kramer : mémoire en défense (Joseph Kramer Against Josef Kramer: Defence), Paris, Polémiques, 1988, 151 p. (BnF 36626799x)
- "Attila Lemage", Manifeste antijuif : du 10^{e} siècle avant notre ère à nos jours, le combat des Titans (Anti-Semitic Manifesto: from the 10th century BC to nowadays, Titans' fight), Issy-les-Moulineaux and Paris, Libre parole and A. Lemage, 1991, 73 p. (BnF 35476667k).

He also prefaced two:

- Friedrich Engels (preface and translation as "Jacques Moulin"), La Campagne pour la constitution du Reich allemand : 1850 (The Campaign for the Constitution of German Reich: 1850), Paris, J. Moulin, 1981, 147 p. (BnF 346906265)
- Maurice Joly (preface as "Jacques Moulin"), Dialogue aux enfers entre Machiavel et Montesquieu : 1864 (The Dialogue in Hell Between Machiavelli and Montesquieu: 1864), Issy-les-Moulineaux, Libre parole, 1991, 180 p. (BnF 35485556m).
