= The Greens (France) =

Former French political party

The Greens Les Verts
- President: Dominique Voynet
- Founded: 20 January 1984
- Dissolved: 13 November 2010
- Merged into: Europe Ecology – The Greens
- Headquarters: 247, Rue du Faubourg Saint-Martin; F-75010 Paris
- Ideology: Green politics Alter-globalization
- Political position: Centre-left to left-wing
- European affiliation: European Green Party
- European Parliament group: Greens/EFA
- International affiliation: Global Greens
- Colours: Green

Website
- http://www.lesverts.fr/

The Greens (French: Les Verts [le vɛʁ], LV; also Les Verts, Confédération écologiste – Parti écologiste, VEC) was a centre-left to left-wing green-ecologist political party in France. The Greens had been in existence since 1984, but their spiritual roots could be traced as far back as René Dumont's candidacy for the presidency in 1974. On 13 November 2010, The Greens merged with Europe Ecology to become Europe Ecology – The Greens.

== History ==
=== Origins ===
Historically the environmental movement in France primarily focused on nature conservation, rather than more fundamental ecological questions, with their political priorities being the creation of nature reserves and the regulation of shooting. This began to change in the late 1960s, with environmentalists becoming more politicised by the Torrey Canyon disaster in 1967 which resulted in crude oil covering beaches and sea birds on the coast of Brittany, and the government's approval of proposals from the private sector to commercially develop the Vanoise National Park in 1968, which led to environmental groups joining forces to successfully oppose the plans. This politicisation led to a split in the environmental movement in the early 1970s, with more traditional conservationists continuing to concentrate on habitat protection, often at a local level, whilst political ecologists advocated for changes in government policy to create a more ecologically sustainable society. This was reflected in environmental groups' stances with regard to the extensive French nuclear power programme, with conservationists maintaining an agnostic position whilst political ecologists participated in the country's anti-nuclear movement, including actions such as the July 1977 protests at the Superphénix reactor.

=== Early years ===
Since 1974, the environmentalist movement has been a permanent feature of the French political scene, contesting every election: municipal, national & European. However, the birth of the green electoral movement can be traced to the 1973 French legislative election, when Ecologie et Survie was founded in Alsace at the home of the anti-nuclear activist Solange Fernex, with another activist who would become a prominent member of the green movement, Antoine Waechter, also in attendance. The party ran Henri Jenn as a candidate for the National Assembly in those elections, achieving 3.7 percent of the vote. Ecologie et Survie would also be involved in Dumont's 1974 presidential campaign, alongside the French section of Friends of the Earth and journalists including Jean Carlier. Dumont won 336,114 votes, or 1.3 percent of the total.

In the years following Dumont's challenge for the presidency, and prior to the formal confirmation of les Verts as political party, environmentalists contested elections under such banners as Ecology 78, Ecology Europe and Ecology Today. In 1976 some environmentalist candidates in Alsace secured over 10 percent of the vote in that year's cantonal elections, whilst Paris-Ecologie ran Friends of the Earth spokesman Brice Lalonde in a by-election to the National Assembly in the 5th arrondissement of Paris, with Dumont as substitute. He achieved 6.5 percent of the vote on a platform of improving quality of life, ending nuclear power, shortening the working week, political decentralisation and use of popular initiatives.

The following year an ecological electoral coalition was formed to contest municipal elections, led by Friends of the Earth, Mouvement Ecologique (which was founded out of Dumont's presidential campaign and brought together local groups including Ecologie et Survie) and SOS-Environnement (an alliance of conservationists, transport users and the disabled which combined direct action which electoral activity). The alliance's platform built on that advocated by Lalonde the previous year. The coalition scored an average of 10.13 percent across Paris, with over 13 percent in the 5th, 6th and 7th arrondissements of Paris, and consistently above five percent in provincial France, with about 30 councillors being elected. However, disagreements between the groups involved and between those in Paris and elsewhere in France led to the alliance's breakup, with Philippe Lebreton founding Ecologie 1978 in Lyon to contest the 1978 French legislative election alongside SOS-Environnement but with opposition from Friends of the Earth. Ecologie 1978 won 499,792 votes, an average of 4.4 percent per candidate. In 1979, Fernex led the Europe-Ecologie list for the first democratic elections to the European Parliament. Despite Friends of the Earth not participating in the list, it scored 4.7 percent of the vote and 888,134 votes in total - the highest proportion of the vote achieved by any green party in the election, with 10.6 percent being achieved in Fernex's home department of Haut-Rhin.

Lalonde was selected as the ecological candidate for the 1981 French presidential election under the "Aujourd'hui Ecologie" banner, however this was controversial, with Lebreton being the only other candidate allowed to stand for the nomination. This was felt by some activists to be undemocratic, who made an unsuccessful attempt to persuade Jacques Cousteau to run as the ecologist candidate. Lalonde won 3.9 percent of the vote and 1,122,445 votes in total: whilst the green vote increased nationwide, it dropped in some of the movement's early strongholds, including Paris, Alsace and Manche. The end of the campaign also saw discord over allegations involving Lalonde and financial irregularities which led to a court case. In the subsequent legislative election the same year, "Aujourd'hui Ecologie" won 157,037 votes across 81 constituencies, an average of 3.6 percent for each candidate.

This period saw moves being made towards establishing a united green party, with Les Verts - Confédération Ecologiste being founded in December 1981 by members of Friends of the Earth and local groups, and Les Verts - Parti Ecologiste established in November 1982 out of the remains of Mouvement Ecologique. In the 1983 French municipal elections, 550 seats were won by ecologist candidates. Negotiations on the merger of the two green groups were triggered by the two parties holding conferences about 40 km away from each other simultaneously in November 1983, with Les Verts being established as a unified party at the end of February 1984 at a meeting in Clichy, in time for the 1984 European Parliament election.

The Greens' Europe-Ecologie list was led by anti-nuclear activist Didier Anger, and opinion polls in early 1984 indicated support of around six percent, above the electoral threshold of five percent which would not only lead to about four MEPs being elected but also the reimbursement of their election expenses. Based on this the party borrowed heavily to finance the campaign, including from the German Greens and both Belgian Green parties, Agalev and Ecolo. However, Europe-Ecologie suffered due to the entry of a rival list, Entente Radicale Ecologiste, featuring former centre-right politician Olivier Stirn, Left Radical François Doubin, and Lalonde. This was the initiative of Left Radical leader Jean-Michel Baylet, with the blessing of his ally, Socialist president François Mitterrand. Lalonde had previously offered to head the Europe-Ecologie list on the condition that the party abandon the policy of immediate unilateral nuclear disarmament, which was rejected. Europe-Ecologie's poll numbers immediately dipped upon the announcement of the rival list and they only scored 3.31 percent and 664,403 votes.

In the 1985 French cantonal elections, ecologists won 91,600 votes but failed to win any councillors. However, the Greens scored at least five percent in over a hundred cantons, with the best results achieved in the movement's stronghold in Alsace, where they scored around 14 percent.

Under the ideological guidance of Antoine Waechter, the party in 1986 signalled a break with the traditional divide in French politics, declaring that environmental politics could not be "married" to either the left or the right (which gave rise to its famous slogan "ni droite, ni gauche" – "neither right, nor left"). That year they contested the legislative elections as well as those for the new regional councils. Candidates scored an average of 2.4 percent in the legislative elections and 3.4 percent in the regional elections, with the best legislative results being in Alsace (3.7 percent) and Marche (3.8 percent). These fell short of the five percent electoral threshold, but the party did elect three regional councillors in these areas - Anger, who scored 5.5 percent in Marche, Andrée Buchmann, who won 5.7 percent in Bas-Rhin, and Waechter, who took 6.5 percent in Haut-Rhin.

Antoine Waechter ran in the 1988 presidential elections, capturing 1,145,502 votes (or 3.8%) in the first round of voting. But the major breakthrough came the following year when – again under the leadership of Waechter – the Greens polled 10.6% in the European parliamentary elections.

However, the party faced with another ecologist party: Ecology Generation led by Lalonde, who had been environment minister of President François Mitterrand and allied with the Socialist Party (PS). In this, if the ecologist parties benefited from the electoral decline of the PS in the beginning of the 1990s, the Greens competed for the leadership of the French ecologist movement. In the 1992 regional elections, the Greens obtained 6.8% of votes and the presidency of Nord-Pas-de-Calais region. The next year, it scored 4.1% in the legislative election while all of the ecologist votes represented 11%. But, without political allies in the second round, they failed to gain a parliamentary seat.

=== Participation in government ===
Waechter's influence was called into question in 1994 when the Greens decided to break with his policy of non-alignment, instead deciding to adopt a markedly left-wing stance. The move prompted Waechter to leave the Greens. He went on to found the Independent Ecological Movement. In the following presidential election of 1995, Dominique Voynet polled a modest 3.8% but, in due to the marginalisation of Ecology Generation, the Greens captured the leadership into the family of the French political ecology.

Component of Plural Left coalition, the Greens obtained for the first time a parliamentary representation in 1997. Dominique Voynet was to lead the party into government for the first time, joining Lionel Jospin's Socialist Party (PS) and the Communist Party (PCF). Voynet was rewarded with the cabinet position of Minister for the Environment and Regional Planning, before being replaced by Yves Cochet in 2001.

Daniel Cohn-Bendit (or "Danny the Red"), a leader of the 1968 student uprising, spearheaded the party's 1999 European campaign, obtaining 9.7% of votes cast, enough to return seven deputies to Strasbourg.

Alain Lipietz was first selected to represent the Greens in the 2002 presidential elections but his public outings proved awkward and he was soon replaced by Noël Mamère who had initially lost the primary elections. Mamère's 5.25% represents the strongest Green challenge for the presidency to date. However, the legislative elections were a major disappointment: with just 4.51% of votes cast nationally, the Greens’ representation fell from six to just three deputies (out of a total of 577) in the National Assembly.

=== Opposition and merger ===
Following the return to opposition benches in 2002, Gilles Lemaire assumed the position of national secretary. His tenure is marked by a period of internal strife in the party. Lemaire was in turn replaced by Yann Wehrling, who seemingly united a majority of the membership under a text outlining the future direction that the party hoped to pursue. He was succeeded by Cécile Duflot in 2006, who was the party's youngest National Secretary at the age of 31. She announced her resignation in May 2012 after being appointed to the new cabinet appointed by President François Hollande.

Les Verts had six MEPs elected in the 2004 European Election with 8.43% of the vote.

In the hugely divisive 2005 referendum on the European Constitution, the Greens campaigned for a Yes vote.

In the 2007 French presidential election, les Verts nominated Dominique Voynet. Her low score of 1.57% in the first round was the party's worst electoral result, and the French ecologist's worst showing since René Dumont in the 1974. The party refused an electoral deal with the Socialists for the June legislative election. However, the three Green incumbents, Noël Mamère, Yves Cochet, and Martine Billard had no PS opposition in their respective constituencies. While the Green's vote share was down from 2002, it won a fourth seat in Nantes where François de Rugy defeated a conservative UMP incumbent. The Greens now had four seats in the Assembly and sat with the PCF in the Democratic and Republican Left group.

In the 2009 European Parliament election, the party was an integral part of the Europe Écologie coalition, led by Daniel Cohn-Bendit, which gained 8 seats for a total of 14 on a 16.3% of the vote. Since November 2010, it merged with the coalition to become Europe Ecology – The Greens.

== The Skandrani Affair ==
One of the party's co-founders, Ginette Skandrani, had long attracted criticism due to her involvement with Holocaust deniers. The Stephen Roth Institute criticized the Green Party in 2004, calling its record "tainted by abortive attempts to expel from within its ranks notorious anti-Jewish activist Ginette Skandrani herself ethnically Jewish who has close contacts with Holocaust deniers."

Other critics, such as Roger Cukierman of the Representative Council of French Jewish Institutions did not attack the party as a whole, but rather its anti-Zionist wing, claiming that it promoted a "brown-green alliance".

In June 2005, the Greens voted to permanently expel Skandrani. Among the reasons for her definitive expulsion were her participation in the holocaust-denial website AAARGH (Association des anciens amateurs de récits de guerres et d'holocaustes). Patrick Farbiaz, a Green leader involved in her expulsion, argued that "although she has not written [anti-Semitic texts] herself, she looks like a kingpen of holocaust deniers and avowed antisemites".

The party had previously expelled another co-founder (in 1991), Jean Brière, for signing a text addressing the alleged "war-causing role" of Israel and "the zionist lobby in the Gulf War."

== Call to lift sanctions against Cypriot Turks ==
Green MEP Helene Flautre has attracted controversy by calling for the lifting of sanctions against Turkish Cypriots imposed by the United Nations.

== Youth wing ==
The youth branch of the Greens, founded in Strasbourg in 2001, is called Les Jeunes Verts – la Souris verte (Young Greens – the Green mouse). It has been part of the Federation of Young European Greens since 2006.

== Factions ==
Most internal divisions within the party concern the party's political position (neither right nor left, or left-wing) and electoral strategy (alliance with the PS or the far-left parties).

- Neo-Waechterians (environmentalists, social liberals, centrists): Followers of former Green leader Antoine Waechter, a large part has joined the Independent Ecological Movement or, more recently, the MoDem (Jean-Luc Bennahmias, Yann Wehrling)
- Green left (eco-socialists, democratic socialists, Maoists): Including members such as Jean Desessard, Yves Contassot and, until recently, Martine Billard

The party's final leadership, led by Cécile Duflot, and including Dominique Voynet, Yves Cochet and Noël Mamère were positioned between the two aforementioned factions.

== Elected officials ==
- Deputies: Yves Cochet, Noël Mamère, François de Rugy (GDR Group). Martine Billard, elected as a Green in 2007 joined the Left Party in July 2009.
- Senators: Marie-Christine Blandin, Alima Boumediene-Thiery, Jean Desessard, Jacques Muller, Dominique Voynet (Socialist Group).
- MEPs: Malika Benarab-Attou, Pascal Canfin, Daniel Cohn-Bendit, Karima Delli, Hélène Flautre, Catherine Grèze, Nicole Kiil-Nielsen, Michèle Rivasi (6 of the 14 MEPs from Europe Écologie are not members of the party).

The Greens held 41 town halls, the largest city being Montreuil (Seine-Saint-Denis). Other cities held by the Greens include Wattwiller, Bègles and Mèze. The party also claims 168 regional councillors and 14 general councillors (plus 9 Parisian councillors).

== Popular support and electoral record ==
The Greens were strong electorally in urban areas, specifically in the Greater Paris area, Brittany and western France, parts of the Rhône-Alpes region and Alsace. In the 2009 European elections, the Greens won their best result outside of Corsica, where their result was due to the support of the Party of the Corsican Nation (PNC), in the city of Paris (27.41%), Haute-Savoie (20.26%), Drôme (21.75%), Isère (21.64%), Hauts-de-Seine (20.74%), Ille-et-Vilaine (20.59%), and Loire-Atlantique (20.16%). It also did very well in large, wealthy urban centres such as Rennes or Grenoble. It does more poorly in rural areas, notably areas where its rival, CPNT, is strong. It also did poorly in industrial or poorer urban areas; for example it won only 9.33% in the Pas-de-Calais, a department formerly dominated by coal mining, in 2009.

=== Presidential ===
| Election | Candidate | First round | | Second round | | Result |
| Election | Candidate | Votes | % | Votes | % | Result |
|---|---|---|---|---|---|---|
| 1988 | Antoine Waechter | 1,149,897 | 3.8% | - | - | Lost |
| 1995 | Dominique Voynet | 1,010,738 | 3.3% | - | - | Lost |
| 2002 | Noël Mamère | 1,495,724 | 5.3% | - | - | Lost |
| 2007 | Dominique Voynet | 576,666 | 1.6% | - | - | Lost |

=== Legislative ===
French National Assembly
| Election year | # of 1st round votes | % of 1st round vote | # of seats |
|---|---|---|---|
| 1986 | 340,109 | 1.21% | 0 |
| 1988 | 86,312 | 0.35% | 0 |
| 1993 | 1,022,196 | 4.08% | 0 |
| 1997 | 1,738,287 | 6.83% | 7 |
| 2002 | 1,138,222 | 4.51% | 3 |
| 2007 | 845,977 | 3.25% | 4 |

=== European Parliament ===
| Election year | # of overall votes | % of overall vote | # of overall seats won | ± | Notes |
|---|---|---|---|---|---|
| 1984 | 680,080 | 3.4 (#5) | 0 / 81 | | |
| 1989 | 1,922,945 | 10.6 (#4) | 9 / 81 | ▲9 | |
| 1994 | 574,806 | 3.0 (#8) | 0 / 87 | ▼9 | |
| 1999 | 1,715,450 | 9.7 (#4) | 9 / 87 | ▲9 | |
| 2004 | 1,271,394 | 7.4 (#5) | 6 / 78 | ▼3 | |
| 2009 | 2,803,759 | 16.3 (#3) | 14 / 72 | ▲8 | |

== See also ==
- European Federation of Green Parties
- List of environmental organizations
