= Valérie Igounet =

French political scientist

- Education: Institut d'études politiques, Paris
- Scientific career
- Fields: Political science
- Workplaces: Modern History Institute, FNCSR
- Doctoral advisor: Pierre Milza

Valérie Igounet (born 1 July 1970) is a French historian and political scientist. She studies the phenomenon of Holocaust denial, and extreme right-wing politics in France. Her research on the history of Holocaust denial and Holocaust revisionism in France traces them to extreme right-wing and also extreme left-wing sources. She was the author of the 2000 book Histoire du négationnisme en France (History of Holocaust Denial in France), as well as a biography of the prominent French Holocaust denier Robert Faurisson.

== Education and workplaces ==
Igounet was born on 1 July 1970. In 1998 she obtained a PhD in history from the Institut d'études politiques in Paris, under the supervision of Pierre Milza. Beginning in the late 1990s, she wrote pieces for Le Monde diplomatique. She then became affiliated with the Institut d'histoire du temps présent of the French National Centre for Scientific Research.

Beginning in 2017, she worked together with Rudy Reichstadt on the site Conspiracy Watch (fr). Since 2019, she has been a member of the French scientific council to the Inter-Ministerial Delegation to Combat Racism, Anti-Semitism, and Anti-LGBT Hate (fr).

== Work ==
=== History of Holocaust denial in France ===
Igounet's work Histoire du négationnisme en France was drawn from her work for her doctoral dissertation. Using archival materials as well as interviews with people involved in Holocaust denial like Maurice Bardèche, Robert Faurisson, Roger Garaudy, Pierre Guillaume, and Jean-Claude Pressac, Igounet narrates the spread of Holocaust denial in France from immediately after the end of World War II, demonstrating how it was facilitated both by the extreme right-wing press and also some sources on the French far left. According to the sociologist Gisèle Sapiro, Igounet centers the roles of anti-Semitism, anti-Zionism, and anti-communism in the history of French Holocaust denial (notably the role of the early National Front leader François Duprat), which existed not just on the extreme right but also in the extreme left during the 1970s, on which side Pierre Guillame played a key role. Olivier Lalieu, a historian at the Mémorial de la Shoah Holocaust museum in Paris, wrote that the chapters related to the activities of Robert Faurisson are the most innovative, both in their descriptions of his relationship with Pierre Guillaume and the role of the extreme left. Shortly after the book's release, Robert Redeker predicted that it would become the main reference work in the subject of the history of Holocaust denial in France.

She subsequently extended her work on far-right politics in France to study the history of the National Front, in the book Le Front National de 1972 à nos jours: le parti, les hommes, les idées (The National Front from 1972 to the present: The party, the men, the ideas).

=== Robert Faurisson ===
In 2012, Igounet continued her work on Holocaust denial with the book Robert Faurisson: portrait d'un négationniste (Robert Faurisson: Portrait of a Holocaust denier). In this book she relied more heavily on oral testimony due to a lack of open archives. According to the historian Grégoire Kauffmann (fr), the book chooses to focus on Faurisson's tendency to repeat falsehoods, particularly about himself. To the historian Stéphanie Courouble-Share, this biography captured deceptions by Faurisson sufficiently well to dispel the ambiguity that had previously characterised the public understanding of him. Robert Faurisson disapproved of the work, but declined to file any civic action against Igounet.

=== Media ===
In addition to her work with Conspiracy Watch, Igounet has extensively published work related to her historical expertise in popular media. In 2018, she co-authored an editorial in Le Monde calling on Israel to recognize the Armenian genocide. She has also published on historical topics in outlets like Harper's Magazine, and her work has been cited in venues like The New York Times and The Times of Israel.

== Selected works ==
- Histoire du négationnisme en France (2000) ISBN 2-02-035492-6, 978-2020354929.
- Robert Faurisson : portrait d'un négationniste (2012) ISBN 2207259986, 9782207259986.
- Le Front national de 1972 à nos jours : le parti, les hommes, les idées (2014)) ISBN 9782021078268.
- Les Faussaires de l'histoire, a film with Michaël Prazan, 2014, Imdb title id 4144712.
