= Fred A. Leuchter =

American Holocaust denier (born 1941)

- Born: Fred Arthur Leuchter Jr. February 7, 1943 (age 83); Malden, Massachusetts, U.S.
- Known for: Manufacturer of execution equipment; author of Holocaust denial literature and speeches

Fred Arthur Leuchter Jr. (born February 7, 1943) is an American manufacturer of execution equipment and Holocaust denier, best known as the author of the Leuchter report, a pseudoscientific document alleging there were no gas chambers at Auschwitz-Birkenau. Prior to the document's publication, he was contracted by authorities of several U.S. states to improve the designs of instruments for capital punishment. He was charged in Massachusetts with misrepresenting himself to penitentiaries as an engineer, despite having no relevant qualifications. He plea bargained with state prosecutors and received two years' probation. He has also been accused of running a "death row shakedown", where he threatened to testify for the defense in capital cases if he was not given contracts for his services by that state.

Leuchter became internationally known for his testimony in defense of Holocaust denier Ernst Zündel in 1988. His study for Zündel's trial has been referred to as the Leuchter report since it was published by Zündel with that title.

Leuchter's work is often presented by Holocaust deniers as scientifically based evidence for Holocaust denial, even though his research methods and findings have been widely discredited on both scientific and historical grounds. Leuchter and his report are the subject of Mr. Death: The Rise and Fall of Fred A. Leuchter, Jr., a 1999 feature-length documentary film by Errol Morris.

== Education and pre-report career ==
Leuchter was born on February 7, 1943, to Fred Arthur Leuchter Sr. in Malden, Massachusetts.

He received a Bachelor of Arts degree in history from Boston University in 1964. He holds patents for a geodetic instrument and an electronic sextant.

=== Fred Leuchter Associates ===
Leuchter started Fred Leuchter Associates in 1979, with which he sold services to several states to help them maintain, improve, document, and ascertain the effectiveness of their equipment for administration of capital punishment. His initial work was with electric chairs, starting in Tennessee. His broader claims are that his work in this area is humanitarian, providing greater respect for both guards and those to be executed. He also claims that he offered his services at considerable economy: off-the-shelf parts, labor, and a 20% profit. By his own account, consultation among various state government agencies spread his reputation from Tennessee to other states, and further assignments followed. Leuchter "aggressively solicited business", and in 1985 the state of New Jersey purchased his proposal for a lethal injection system for $30,000.

== Zündel trial and investigation at Auschwitz ==
In 1988 Leuchter was hired by Ernst Zündel, who was being tried in Canada for publishing works of Holocaust denial, to investigate and testify as an expert witness at his trial, for a fee of $30,000. Leuchter was recommended to Zündel by Bill Armontrout, warden for Missouri State Penitentiary in Jefferson City, Missouri. In his capacity as warden, Armontrout was personally responsible for carrying out executions by the use of cyanide gas. Leuchter traveled to Auschwitz and Birkenau to examine the structures identified by former guards, former prisoners, and investigators as gas chambers, and concluded that they could not have been used for mass murder.

Zündel's Samisdat Publications published his findings as The Leuchter Report: An Engineering Report on the Alleged Execution Chambers at Auschwitz, Birkenau, and Majdanek Poland (published in England as Auschwitz: The End of the Line: The Leuchter Report – The First Forensic Examination of Auschwitz), which the court accepted only as evidentiary display and not as direct evidence. Leuchter was therefore required to explain it and to testify to the validity of his conclusions under oath during the trial. His report was republished and translated by various denial organizations, and he has since lectured on it and his subsequent experiences. Protests were organized in response to his lectures.

In 1988, prior to writing the report, Leuchter had traveled to several sites of structures identified as gas chambers, where, without permission, he collected samples from walls, ceilings and floors, using a chisel and hammer to chip and scrape off pieces of the masonry. He took copious notes about the floor plans and layout, and all of his actions were videotaped by a cameraman. (Leuchter, who had married only about one month before the trip, told his wife that the trip to Auschwitz-Birkenau was their honeymoon.) Leuchter then brought the samples back to Boston, where he presented them to Alpha Analytical Laboratories, a chemical laboratory, for testing. Leuchter told Alpha only that he would use the samples as evidence in a court case about an industrial accident. The lab tested them for exposure to cyanide and found trace amounts in the crematoria, which Leuchter dismissed in his report:

It is notable that almost all the samples were negative and that the few that were positive were very close to the detection level (1mg/kg); 6.7 mg/kg at Krema III; 7.9 mg/kg at Krema I. The absence of any consequential readings at any of the tested locations as compared to the control sample reading 1050 mg/kg supports the evidence that these facilities were not execution gas chambers. The small quantities detected would indicate that at some point these buildings were deloused with Zyklon B—as were all the buildings at all these facilities.

Leuchter compared the low amounts in the Krema to the higher readings in his positive control sample.

Lab manager James Roth testified under oath to the results at the trial. It was only after he left the stand that Roth learned what the trial was about. In an interview for Morris's film, Roth states that cyanide would have formed an extremely fine layer on the walls, to the depth of one-tenth of a human hair. Leuchter had taken samples of indeterminate thickness (he is seen in Morris's film hammering at the bricks with a rock hammer). Not informed of this, Roth had pulverized the entire samples, thus severely diluting the cyanide-containing layer of each sample with an indeterminate amount of brick, varying for each sample. Roth offers the analogy that the tests were like "analyzing paint on a wall by analyzing the timber that's behind it."

Leuchter did not examine the walls of the gas chambers until 50 years after they had been used; his critics note that it would have been virtually impossible to discover any cyanide at all using his method. In fact, tests conducted on ventilation grates immediately after the end of the war showed substantial amounts of cyanide. The chambers were demolished by the Nazis when they abandoned Auschwitz, and the facilities Leuchter examined were, in fact, partially reconstructed. Leuchter was unaware that parts of the camp and chambers had been reconstructed, so he had no way of knowing if the bricks he was scraping had actually been used in the original gas chamber.

Leuchter claimed that the relatively low concentration of cyanide residue measured in his samples of the remains of the gas chambers in Auschwitz, compared to his samples of the "delousing chambers" in which clothes were deloused using the same gas, hydrogen cyanide, excluded the possibility of them being used to kill humans. His report assumed that lower concentrations are required for delousing than to kill humans and other warm-blooded creatures; in fact, with their simpler structures and slower metabolisms, insects are more resistant to such gross metabolic poisons than mammals. Both toxicological study and practical experience demonstrate that it takes a much higher concentration of cyanide (16,000 parts per million) to kill insects than to kill humans (300 ppm), as well as an exposure time of many hours rather than only minutes. Leuchter also failed to explain his belief that Zyklon B was used only for delousing, in view of his belief that the product would present technical difficulties in ventilating and decontaminating such as to make it impractical for use in a gas chamber. Nor did he explain why such large chambers would be needed for delousing clothes.

Leuchter also wrongly assumed that it would take 20 to 30 hours to air a room disinfected with Zyklon B. Since far lower concentrations are required when gassing people than for delousing, it would take only 20 to 30 minutes to ventilate the room; therefore, the forced-ventilation systems used would be more than adequate to allow the gas chambers to be operated without endangering the executioners.

Leuchter's report also made claims about the capacity of the crematoria, although he admitted he had no experience with cremation technology. When questioned in court, Leuchter admitted he had never seen a document by the Waffen-SS Commandant for construction issued when the crematoria were constructed, which estimated they had a 24-hour capacity of 4,756 people, more than 30 times Leuchter's estimate of 156.

=== Repeating of Leuchter report's tests ===
In February 1990, Professor Jan Markiewicz, Director of the Forensic Institute of Kraków, redid the analysis. Markiewicz decided that the Prussian blue test was unreliable because it depended on the acidity of the environment, which was low in the gas chambers. Markiewicz and his team used microdiffusion techniques to test for cyanide in samples from the gas chambers, from delousing chambers, and from living areas elsewhere within Auschwitz. The negative control samples from the living quarters tested negative, while cyanide residue was found in both the delousing chambers and the gas chambers. The amount of cyanide found had a great variability, possibly due to 50 years of exposure to the elements to varying degrees, but even so, the categorical results were that cyanide was found where expected in both the gas chambers and the delousing facilities, and not found in the living quarters, supporting the hypothesis that the gas chambers were exposed to high levels of cyanide like the delousing facilities, and not low levels for routine fumigation, like the living quarters.

== Life and career after Leuchter report ==
Protests were organized outside the courthouse in Canada and near Leuchter's home in Malden, Massachusetts. Despite the bad publicity, he remained active as a capital punishment consultant until 1990, when his lack of qualifications to practice was exposed. In the late 1980s, following the Ernst Zündel trial, he was featured in both The Atlantic Monthly and Primetime Live in items on capital punishment, neither of which mentioned his association with Zündel. Also following his involvement in the Zündel trial, Leuchter began lecturing to Holocaust denial groups, such as the Institute for Historical Review (IHR), about his research and continued belief in the conclusions he testified to in the trial. In a speech to the Eleventh IHR Conference in October 1992, he said:

In this case, it is myself that I post mortem—and the cadaver isn't dead! Much to the dismay of my executioners, the execution was so badly botched that I am able to stand here before you to speak the truth, and to tell the world that it is not myself, but the Holocaust story that is dead. I repeat for the record: I was condemned for maintaining that there were no execution gas chambers as Auschwitz, Birkenau, Majdanek, Dachau, Mauthausen, or Hartheim Castle. There's no proof for the charge, only innuendo, lies, and half-truths. Robert Faurisson, Ernst Zundel and others said this first. They, too, live as victims of botched executions, but nevertheless free to speak the truth in a strong and growing voice that repeats: No gas chambers, no gas chambers, no damn gas chambers!

Because I was somewhat naïve at the time, I was not aware that by so testifying I was offending the organized world Jewish community. By providing final, definitive proof that there were no execution gas chambers utilized for genocidal purposes by the Germans at these wartime camps, I established the simple fact that the Holocaust story is not true. What I did not know was that anyone expressing such beliefs is guilty of a capital crime: that of thinking and telling the unspeakable truth about the greatest lie of the age.

I would have to pay for this crime. While I innocently told the truth in Toronto, plans were made, and subsequently implemented, for a major effort to destroy me. If I could be destroyed and discredited—so the reasoning went—no one would accept my professional findings, no matter how truthful.

When he tried to sell parts of a lethal injection machine and other items from Fred Leuchter Associates, many of which were part of projects done for states who had refused to pay him for previously contracted or agreed-on work, he was again charged. When he claimed that the Massachusetts Attorney General determined that the sale of the offered equipment was not, in fact, illegal, states started denying his contracts on the basis of his lack of qualifications. His wife divorced him in this same period.

Leuchter was arrested in and shortly thereafter deported from the United Kingdom in November 1991. He had been banned from entering the country by the Home Office, thus his entry and presence there were illegal. Leuchter claimed that United States consulate personnel effectively refused him aid. He had been interrupted while giving an invited speech at David Irving's instigation; his talk followed immediately one by Robert Faurisson. Leuchter has blamed criticism of his work on an "international cabal ... those who have unjustly attacked me and violated my rights ... the Klarsfelds, Shapiros, and Kahns of the world".

According to the Institute for Historical Review, Leuchter subsequently took employment as a telemarketer.

According to The New York Times, before selling execution equipment, Leuchter was a dealer in military surveillance equipment.

On October 24, 1990, The New York Times described him as "self-proclaimed execution expert and manufacturer of death machinery." It quoted Edward A. Brunner, chairman of the anesthesia department at Northwestern University Medical School, as saying Leuchter's lethal injection system would indeed paralyze a condemned criminal with Pavulon, but that far from being humane, the paralysis would merely stop the prisoner from screaming at the "extreme pain in the form of a severe burning sensation" caused by the potassium chloride injection. Potassium chloride is commonly used in judicial execution through lethal injection.

Leuchter's electric chair design was used by the state of Tennessee to execute Daryl Holton in 2007 and Edmund Zagorski in 2018.

=== Allegations of dishonest court appearances ===
In 1990 Newsweek reported Alabama assistant attorney general Ed Carnes having called Leuchter's views on the gas chamber "unorthodox", and alleging that "Leuchter was running a death row shakedown scheme: if a state didn't purchase Leuchter's services, he would testify at the last minute for the condemned man that the state's death chamber might malfunction." The Associated Press quoted Carnes as claiming that Leuchter made "money on both sides of the fence". In his memorandum to death penalty states, Carnes observed that in Florida and Virginia the federal courts had rejected Leuchter's testimony as unreliable. The court in Florida had found that Leuchter had "misquoted the statements" contained in an important affidavit and had "inaccurately surmised" a crucial premise of his conclusion.

In Virginia, Leuchter provided a death row inmate's attorney with an affidavit claiming the electric chair would fail. The Virginia court decided the credibility of Leuchter's affidavit was limited because Leuchter was "the refused contractor who bid to replace the electrodes in the Virginia chair".

=== Charges of practicing without a license ===
In 1991 Leuchter faced charges of practicing engineering without a license issued by the Board of Registration of Professional Engineers and of Land Surveyors, which regulates professional engineers, a violation of Massachusetts law. As a result of those charges, Leuchter signed a consent decree with the board, in which he stated that he was not and had never been registered as a professional engineer, despite having represented himself as one. He settled with prosecutors by serving two years of probation and agreeing to stop disseminating documents in which he presented himself as an engineer, including the Leuchter report. In a speech given over a year later, Leuchter claimed that:

a spurious criminal complaint was filed against me in the Massachusetts court system with the intent of destroying my reputation by putting me in prison for three months.

In point of fact, a license is not required in Massachusetts, or any other state, unless the engineer is involved in construction of buildings, and is certifying compliance with specifications. There is also a statutory exemption for engineers who do not deal with the general public.

As confirmation of the spurious nature of this charge, it should be pointed out there are more than fifty thousand practicing engineers in Massachusetts, of whom only five thousand are licensed. Although the state's licensing law has been in effect since 1940, there has been no record of any prosecution for this offense.

Leuchter attributed the actions of the regulatory board against him to pressure from Jewish groups.

== Documentary ==
Leuchter is the subject of a 1999 documentary by Errol Morris, entitled Mr. Death: The Rise and Fall of Fred A. Leuchter, Jr.

== Works ==
- Fred A. Leuchter, The Leuchter Report: The First Forensic Examination of Auschwitz
- Fred Leuchter & Robert Faurisson, The Second Leuchter Report, The Journal of Historical Review, Vol. 10, No.3 Fall, 1990.
- Fred Leuchter, The Third Leuchter Report: A Technical Report on the Execution Gas Chamber at Mississippi State Penitentiary Parchman, Mississippi, Toronto, Samisdat Publishers (imprint of Ernst Zundel).
- Fred A. Leuchter Jr., The Fourth Leuchter Report: An Engineering Evaluation of Jean-Claude Pressac's Book "Auschwitz: Technique and Operation of the Gas Chambers" Hamilton, Ontario, History Buff Books and Video.
- Fred A. Leuchter, Robert Faurisson, Germar Rudolf, The Leuchter Reports: Critical Edition, Chicago, Theses & Dissertations Press, 2005 (imprint of Germar Rudolf).

== See also ==
- Jean-Claude Pressac
