= Richard J. Green =

American chemist

Richard J. Green (born c. 1964, Boston, Massachusetts) is an American chemist known for his work against the claims of Holocaust deniers. He is a member of The Holocaust History Project. He was raised in Shaker Heights, Ohio, a suburb of Cleveland, and he graduated in 1983 from Hawken School, a private preparatory day school for boys and girls. He received a BA from St. John's College, U.S. in Santa Fe, New Mexico, a "Great Books" school.

He received his PhD in physical chemistry from Stanford University in 1997 under the guidance of Professor Richard N. Zare. He was a postdoc and faculty intern at the University of Utah, Salt Lake City, and went on to work for a contractor to the U.S. government. He became known for his refutation of the Leuchter report and the Rudolf report, done together with Jamie McCarthy. Besides, he issued an expert report to the court on the occasion of the Irving v. Lipstadt Trial. Ambassador Deborah Lipstadt won at trial.

Dr. Green is Chief Program Officer at the U.S. Army DEVCOM Soldier Boston.
