= Leuchter report =

Pseudoscientific document

The Leuchter report is a pseudoscientific document authored by American execution technician Fred A. Leuchter, who was commissioned by Ernst Zündel to defend him at his trial in Canada for distributing Holocaust denial material. Leuchter compiled the report in 1988 with the intention of investigating the feasibility of mass homicidal gassings at Nazi extermination camps, specifically at Auschwitz. He traveled to the camp, collected multiple pieces of brick from the remains of the crematoria and gas chambers (without the camp's permission), brought them back to the United States, and submitted them for chemical analysis. At the trial, Leuchter was called upon to defend the report in the capacity of an expert witness; however, during the trial, the court ruled that he had neither the qualifications nor experience to act as such.

Leuchter cited the absence of Prussian blue in the homicidal gas chambers to support his view that they could not have been used to gas people. However, residual iron-based cyanide compounds are not a categorical consequence of cyanide exposure. In addition, the walls and ceilings of the gas chambers were covered with plaster. The Prussian blue would have remained on the surface of the plaster and would not have left a substantial presence on the bricks, mortar, or cement beneath. By the time Leuchter arrived at Auschwitz-Birkenau to take these samples, the plaster had long since disappeared due to aging and exposure. By not discriminating against that, Leuchter introduced an unreliable factor into his experiment, and his findings were seriously flawed as a result. In contrast, tests conducted by Polish forensic scientists (who discriminated against iron-based compounds) confirmed the presence of cyanide in the locations, in accordance with where and how it was used in the Holocaust. In addition, the report was criticized as Leuchter had overlooked critical evidence, such as documents in the SS architectural office which recorded the mechanical operation of the gas chambers and others which verified the rate at which the Nazis could burn the bodies of those gassed.

== Background ==
In 1985, Ernst Zündel, a German pamphleteer and publisher living in Canada, was put on trial for publishing Richard Verrall's Holocaust denial pamphlet Did Six Million Really Die?, which was deemed to violate Canadian laws against distributing false news. Zündel was found guilty, but the conviction was overturned on appeal. This led to a second prosecution.

Zündel and his lawyers were joined by Robert Faurisson, a French academic of literature and Holocaust denier, who came to Toronto to advise the defense, having previously testified as expert witness at the first trial. He was joined by David Irving, an English writer and Holocaust denier, who was to assist the defense and testify on Zündel's behalf. Faurisson claimed that it was technically and physically impossible for the gas chambers at Auschwitz to have functioned as extermination facilities, based on comparisons with American execution gas chambers; he therefore suggested getting an American prison warden who had participated in executions by gas to testify. Irving and Faurisson therefore invited Bill Armontrout, warden of the Missouri State Penitentiary, who agreed to testify and suggested they contact Fred A. Leuchter, a Bostonian execution equipment designer. Faurisson reported that Leuchter initially accepted the mainstream account of the Holocaust, but after two days of discussion with him, he stated that Leuchter was convinced that homicidal gassings never occurred. After having met Zündel in Toronto and agreeing to serve as an expert witness for his defense, Leuchter traveled with them to spend a week in Poland. He was accompanied by his draftsman, a cinematographer supplied by Zündel, a translator fluent in German and Polish, and his wife. Although Zündel and Faurisson did not accompany them, Leuchter said that they were with them "every step of the way" in spirit.

After arriving in Poland the group spent three days at the former Auschwitz concentration camp site, and another at the former Majdanek concentration camp. At these, they filmed Leuchter illicitly collecting what he regarded to be forensic quality samples of materials from the wreckage of the former gas extermination facilities, while his wife and the translator acted as lookouts. Drawings of where the samples were taken from, the film footage of their physical collection and Leuchter's notebook detailing the work were surrendered to the trial court as evidence. Leuchter claimed that his conclusions were based on his expert knowledge of gas chamber operation, his visual inspection of what remained of the structures at Auschwitz, and original drawings and blueprints of some of the facilities. He said that the blueprints had been given to him by Auschwitz Museum officials.

== Report ==
The compiled report was published in Canada as The Leuchter Report: An Engineering Report on the Alleged Execution Gas Chambers at Auschwitz, Birkenau, and Majdanek, Poland, by Zündel's Samisdat Publications, and in England as Auschwitz: The End of the Line. The Leuchter Report: The First Forensic Examination of Auschwitz by Focal Point Publications, David Irving's publishing house. However, the court accepted the report only as evidentiary display and not as direct evidence; Leuchter was therefore required to explain it and testify to its veracity in the trial.

Before Leuchter could do this, he was examined by the court. He admitted that he was not a toxicologist and dismissed the need for having a degree in engineering:

THE COURT: How do you function as an engineer if you don't have an engineering degree?

THE WITNESS: Well, I would question, Your Honour, what an engineering degree is. I have a Bachelor of Arts degree and I have the required background training both on the college level and in the field to perform my function as an engineer.

THE COURT: Who determines that? You?

— Exchange between Leuchter and Judge Thomas, Her Majesty the Queen vs. Ernst Zündel, District Court of Ontario 1988, p. 8973.

Leuchter admitted under oath that he only had a Bachelor of Arts degree and implicitly suggested that an engineering degree was unavailable to him by saying that his college did not offer an engineering degree during his studies. Boston University actually offered three different kinds of such qualification when he was a student there. When asked by the court if the B.A. he obtained was in a field that entitled him to operate as an engineer, he confirmed that this was so, even though his degree was in history. Similarly, Leuchter claimed that he obtained most of his research material on the camps (including original crematoria blueprints) from the Auschwitz and Majdanek camps' archives, and testified that these documents had a far more important role in shaping his conclusions than the physical samples he collected, yet after the trial the director of the Auschwitz museum denied that Leuchter had received any plans or blueprints from them.

Judge Ronald Thomas began to label Leuchter's methodology as "ridiculous" and "preposterous", dismissing many of the report's conclusions on the basis that they were based on "second-hand information", and refused to allow him to testify on the effect of Zyklon B on humans because he had never worked with the substance, and was neither a toxicologist nor a chemist. Judge Thomas dismissed Leuchter's opinion because it was of "no greater value than that of an ordinary tourist", and in regards to Leuchter's opinion said:

His opinion on this report is that there were never any gassings or there was never any exterminations carried on in this facility. As far as I am concerned, from what I've heard, he is not capable of giving that opinion....He is not in a position to say, as he said so sweepingly in this report, what could not have been carried on in these facilities.

— Judge Thomas, Her Majesty the Queen vs. Ernst Zündel, District Court of Ontario 1988, p. 9049-9050.

When questioned on the functioning of the crematoria, the judge also prevented Leuchter from testifying because "he hasn't any expertise". Leuchter also claimed that consultation relating to sodium cyanide and hydrogen cyanide with DuPont was "an on-going thing". DuPont, the largest American manufacturer of hydrogen cyanide, stated that it had "never provided any information on cyanides to persons representing themselves as Holocaust deniers, including Fred Leuchter", and had "never provided any information regarding the use of cyanide at Auschwitz, Birkenau or Majdanek."

== Claims and criticism ==
The contents of the report, in particular Leuchter's methodology, are heavily criticized. James Roth, the manager of the lab that carried out the analysis on the samples Leuchter collected, swore under oath to the results at the trial. Roth did not learn what the trial was about until he got off the stand. He later stated that cyanide would have only penetrated to a depth of around 10 micrometers, a tenth of the thickness of a human hair. The samples of brick, mortar and concrete that Leuchter took were of indeterminate thickness: not being aware of this, the lab ground the samples to a fine powder which thus severely diluted the cyanide-containing layer of each sample with an indeterminate amount of brick, varying for each sample. A more accurate analysis would have been obtained by analyzing the surface of the samples Leuchter collected. Roth offered the analogy that the investigation was like analyzing paint on a wall by analyzing the timber behind it.

=== Prussian blue ===
Leuchter's opposition to the possibility of homicidal gassings at Auschwitz relies on residual cyanide remains found in the homicidal gas chambers and delousing chambers at Auschwitz. While both facilities were exposed to the same substance (Zyklon B), many of the delousing chambers are stained with an iron-based compound known as Prussian blue, which is not apparent in the homicidal gas chambers. It is not only this disparity that Leuchter cites, but accordingly from his samples (which included measurements of it) that he claims he measured much more cyanide in the delousing chambers than in the gas chambers, which he argues is inconsistent between the amounts necessary to kill human beings and lice. This argument is often cited by Holocaust deniers, and similar claims are also made by Germar Rudolf.

According to Richard J. Green:

In order for Leuchter or Rudolf to demonstrate the significance of their findings, it is necessary for them to prove the necessity of Prussian blue formation under the conditions that the homicidal gas chambers were operated. Showing that the delousing chambers have Prussian blue and that the homicidal gas chambers do not, proves nothing, if it cannot be shown that conditions in the gas chambers were such as to produce Prussian blue.

In other words, Green states that Leuchter failed to show that Prussian Blue would have been produced in the homicidal gas chambers in the first place—meaning its absence is not in itself proof that no homicidal gassings took place.

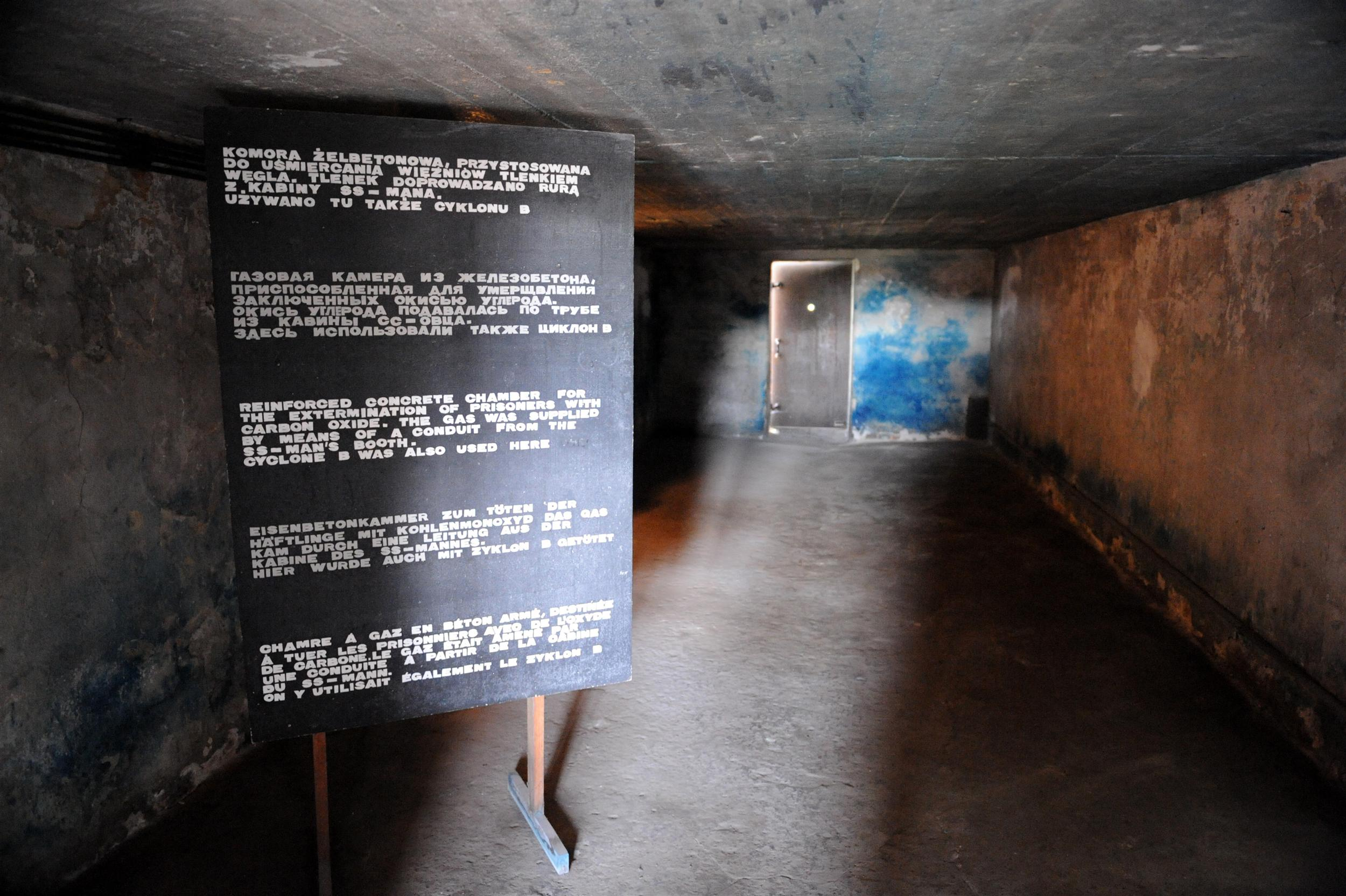
Gas chamber in Majdanek concentration camp with blue residue

The problem with Prussian blue is that it is by no means a categorical sign of cyanide exposure. One factor necessary in its formation is a very high concentration of cyanide. In terms of the difference between amounts measured in the delousing chambers and homicidal gas chambers, critics explain that the exact opposite of what deniers claim is true. Insects have a far higher resistance to cyanide than humans, with concentration levels up to 16,000 ppm (parts per million) and an exposure time of more than 20 hours (sometimes as long as 72 hours) being necessary for them to succumb. In contrast, a cyanide concentration of only 300 ppm is fatal to humans in a matter of minutes. This difference is one of the reasons behind the concentration disparity. Another exceedingly sensitive factor by which very small deviances could determine whether Prussian blue may form is pH. pH could be affected by the presence of human beings. Also, while the delousing chambers were left intact, the ruins of the crematoria at Birkenau had been exposed to the elements for over forty years by the time Leuchter collected his samples. This would have severely affected his results, because unlike Prussian blue and other iron-based cyanides, cyanide salts are highly soluble in water.

Since the formation of Prussian blue is not an unconditional outcome of exposure to cyanide, it is not a reliable indicator. Leuchter and Rudolf claim to have measured much more cyanide in the delousing chambers than in the homicidal gas chambers, but since they did not discriminate against an unreliable factor, Green maintains that instant bias is introduced into their experiments. Similarly, Rudolf acknowledges that Prussian blue does not always form upon exposure to cyanide and is thus not a reliable marker, yet continues to include the iron compounds in his analysis. Green describe this as "disingenuous". Since a building that contains Prussian blue staining would exhibit much higher levels of detectable cyanides than one without any, Green writes that Leuchter's and Rudolf's measurements reveal nothing more than what is already visible to the naked eye.

==== Polish follow-up investigation ====
In February 1990, Professor Jan Markiewicz, director of The Institute for Forensic Research (IFRC) in Kraków conducted an experiment where iron compounds were excluded. Given that the ruins of the gas chambers at Birkenau have been exposed to a cumulative 35 meters of precipitation based on climatological records since 1945, Markiewicz and his team were not optimistic at being able to detect cyanides so many years later; nevertheless, having the legal permission to obtain samples, they collected some from areas as sheltered from the elements as possible.

Leuchter's report stated that the small amounts of cyanide he detected in the ruins of the crematoria are merely the result of fumigation. However the IFRC points out that the control samples they took from living areas which may have been fumigated only once as part of the 1942 typhus epidemic tested negative for cyanide, and that the typhus epidemic occurred before the crematoria at Birkenau even existed.

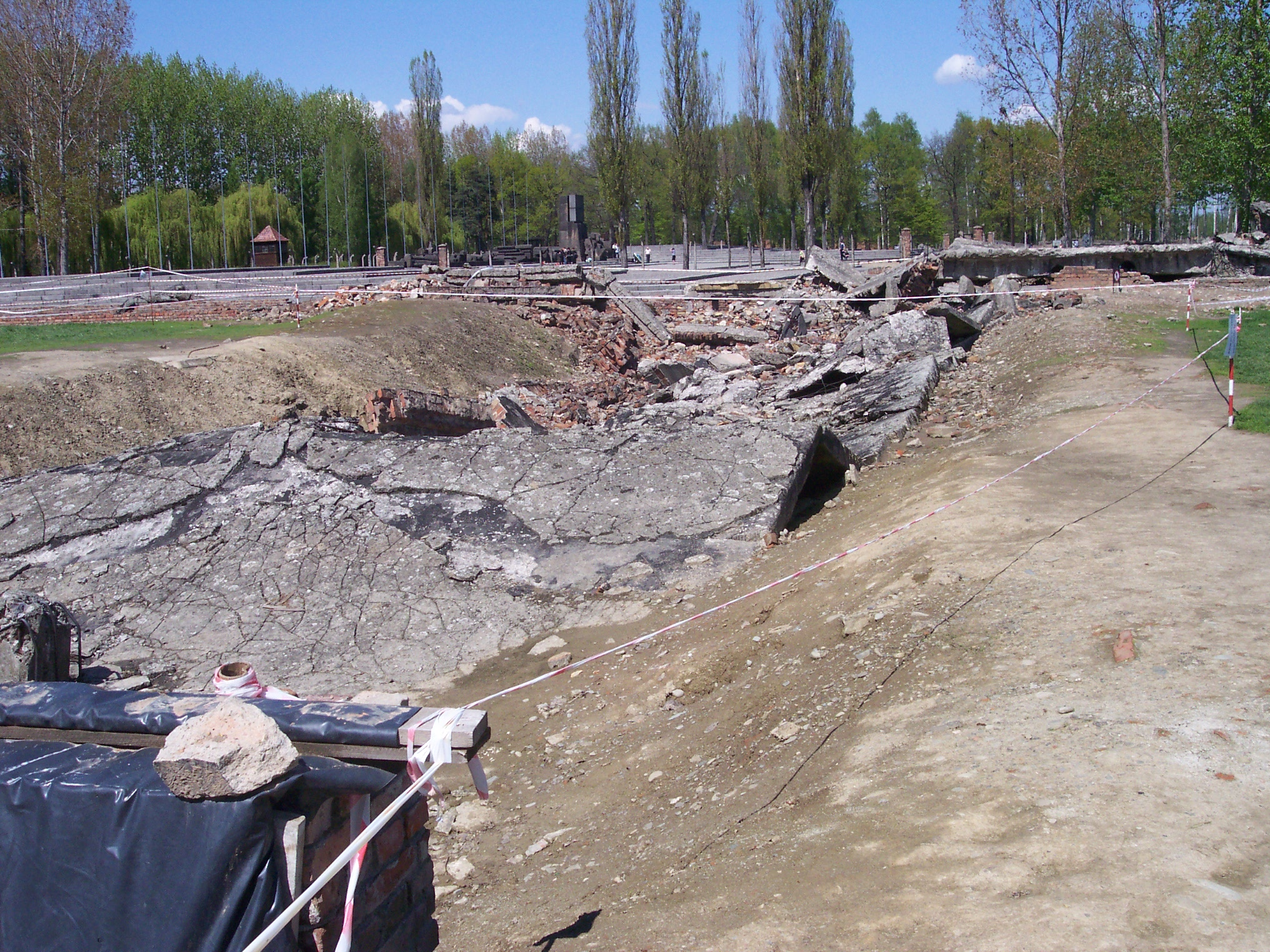
The ruins of the Crematorium II gas chamber at Auschwitz-Birkenau.

Accordingly, the IFRC demonstrated that cyanides were present in all of the facilities where it is claimed that they were exposed, i.e. all five crematoria, the cellars of Block 11 and the delousing facilities. Critics state that any attempt to demonstrate that the crematoria could not have functioned as homicidal gas chambers on the basis that they were not exposed to cyanide is unsuccessful, given that its presence in what remains of these facilities is incontrovertible, and write that all of the gas chambers were exposed to cyanide at levels higher than background levels elsewhere in the camp, such as living areas, where no cyanides at all were detected. In addition, tests conducted at Auschwitz in 1945 revealed the presence of cyanides on ventilation grilles found in the ruins of Crematorium II (thus also demonstrating that the Leuchter report was not the first forensic examination of the camp as purported in the title of the London edition). The historian Richard J. Evans argued that due to Leuchter's ignorance of the large disparity between the amounts of cyanide necessary to kill humans and lice, instead of disproving the homicidal use of gas chambers, the small amounts of cyanide which Leuchter detected actually tended to confirm it.

=== Other criticisms ===
By order of Heinrich Himmler, the crematoria and gas chambers at Birkenau were destroyed by the SS in order to hide evidence of genocide. Nothing more than the bases of Crematoria IV and V can be seen: the floor plans of both facilities are indicated by bricks laid out across the concrete foundations, and Crematoria II and III are in ruins. Professor Robert Jan van Pelt labels Leuchter's comment that the facilities have not changed at all since 1942 or 1941 as "nonsense".

==== Zyklon B ====
Because hydrogen cyanide is explosive, Leuchter maintained that the gas chambers could never have been operated due to their proximity to the ovens of the crematoria. It is correct that hydrogen cyanide is explosive, but only at concentrations of 56,000 ppm and above – over 186 times more than the lethal dose of 300 ppm. Critics estimate conservatively that within 5 to 15 minutes, gas chamber victims were exposed to 450 – 1810 ppmv – again considerably lower than the lower explosion limit.

==== Gas chamber ventilation ====
If Leuchter had gone to the archives, if he had spent time in the archives, he would've found evidence about ventilation systems, evidence about ways to introduce Zyklon B into these buildings, evidence of gas chambers, undressing rooms.

— Robert Jan van Pelt, The Rise and Fall of Fred A. Leuchter

Nazi blueprints of the Crematorium II gas chamber, labeled, Leichenkeller or "corpse cellar". A cross section view of the width of the room shows the ventilation channels that straddle the building along its longitudinal axis, marked Belüftung (aeration) and Entlüftungskanal (de-aeration channel).

Leuchter incorrectly assumed that the gas chambers were not ventilated. The basement gas chambers of Crematoria II and III were mechanically ventilated via motors in the roof space of the main crematorium structure capable of extracting the remaining gas and renewing the air every three to four minutes.

When ventilation was not used such as in Crematoria IV and V (although a ventilation system was later installed in Crematorium V in May 1944), Sonderkommando prisoners wore gas masks when removing the bodies. When presented in court with a document by the chief Auschwitz architect SS-Sturmbannführer Karl Bischoff, Leuchter misconstrued aeration (Belüftung) and ventilation (Entlüftung) as part of the furnace blower systems, when they were actually in reference to the ventilation channels in the walls that straddle the gas chambers. These are visible on blueprints, and can still partly be seen in the ruined east wall of the Crematorium III gas chamber.

==== Body disposal ====
Daily crematoria capacity
Installation	Corpses
Crematorium I	340
Crematorium II	1440
Crematorium III	1440
Crematorium IV	768
Crematorium V	768
Total	4,756

Leuchter was also prepared to act as expert witness regarding crematoria ovens despite admitting during cross examination that he had no expert knowledge. Leuchter presented his own estimate of 156 corpses as the total daily incineration capacity of the installations at Auschwitz. During cross-examination, he was presented with a letter written by the Auschwitz Central Construction Office (Auschwitz Zentralbauleitung) of June 28, 1943, from SS-Sturmbannführer Jahrling to SS-Brigadeführer Hans Kammler stating that the five crematoria installations had a collective daily capacity of 4,756 corpses. Leuchter conceded that this was quite different from his own figure, and that he had never seen the document in question before.

A patent application by the makers of the ovens, (both of which were made during the war) and two independent testimonies confirmed the capacity of the crematoria. The 4,756 figure is evidence of the Nazis equipping a camp of a maximum of 125,000 prisoners with the facility to cremate 140,000 of them per month. Critics of Leuchter explain that this reveals extermination was the true purpose of Auschwitz: a camp with the capacity to reduce its entire population to ash on a monthly basis was not merely a benign internment camp.

At various times (such as in the summer of 1944 when the crematoria couldn't keep up with the extermination rate), bodies were burnt in open-air pits. Accordingly, the capacity of the crematoria was never a limiting factor, and the pits yielded practically no limit to the number of corpses that could be burnt.

== See also ==
- Jean-Claude Pressac
- Mr. Death: The Rise and Fall of Fred A. Leuchter, Jr.

== Bibliography ==
- Lipstadt, Deborah. Denying the Holocaust – The Growing Assault on Truth and Memory. Free Press, 1993, ISBN 0-02-919235-8
