= Europalestine =

CAPJPO-Europalestine is a French non-governmental organization (NGO), founded by Olivia Zemor, dedicated to the ending of "the occupation of the Palestinian territories" in compliance with UN Security Council Resolution 242 passed after the Six-Day War in 1967. According to the organization, it was formed by the Coordination des Appels pour une Paix Juste au Proche-Orient, created in February 2002 and signed in less than three months by more than 12,000 people.

Europalestine's aim is to pressure the European Union and the French government to force Israel "to respect the resolutions of UN, Geneva Conventions, and the recent ruling by the International Court of Justice of the Hague" declaring the construction of the Israeli West Bank barrier as illegal. The group argues that any "aid or assistance in maintaining the situation created by such construction" of the barrier is illegal for all states which recognize the International Court of Justice, while parties to the Fourth Geneva Convention are also obliged "to ensure compliance by Israel with international humanitarian law".

== See also ==
- International law and the Arab-Israeli conflict
- Pierre Vidal-Naquet
- Gush Shalom
- International Solidarity Movement
