= Serge Thion =

French sociologist

Serge Thion (25 April 1942 – 15 October 2017, Créteil) was a French sociologist. A former researcher at the French National Center for Scientific Research, he was dismissed from his position at the center for Holocaust denial activities.

== Career ==
Thion worked as a researcher at the French National Centre for Scientific Research (CNRS) from 1971 to 2000. Most of his research there focused on Cambodia and Vietnam. Thion was the subject of some controversy when he wrote that "genocide" was, technically, not a proper description of what happened in Cambodia during the Khmer Rouge rule, because it was not a type (or an attempt) of killing based on purely ethnic grounds. According to Thion:

The reality is that genocide, massacres, wiping out entire peoples or cultures, and other inhuman atrocities, torture, massive corruption, and so on, are part and parcel of government policies, most usually applied to foreign countries. There is no other law than the law of the jungle. If we want to change this situation, we must reform our own laws first, strip the authorities of their political immunity, abolish the "Reason of State" and the system of official secrecy which covers up all these crimes. If we could reach a stage in which any official would be tried according to the same rules that apply to you and me, to any other ordinary human being, we would not need all these extraordinary concepts because common law is quite enough.

I of course fully agree that Pol Pot should be prevented by any means from returning to power. I find it a bit paradoxical that so much blame was poured on the Vietnamese, who did just that, prevent Pol Pot from coming back, by people who did so much to promote the same Pol Pot and insisted he kept his seat in the United Nations. I am also fully in favour of a trial of Pol Pot and of his accomplices and his foreign associates, including American, Thai and Chinese officials who conspired to support him when he was in power and after his fall. I suggest the application of the ordinary Cambodian law for events which took place in Cambodia.

Genocide is nothing else but a political label aiming at the exclusion of a political leader or party beyond the bonds of humanity. It leads us to believe we are good, that we have nothing to do with these monsters. This is entirely misleading. Pol Pot has been produced by our political world, is part of it, is using it and is getting strong from it. Before saying he is dirty – which is what he is without a doubt – we should clean our own house first.

== Holocaust denial ==
In 1993, Thion privately published Une Allumette sur la banquise (A Matchstick on an Ice Flow). The book criticized what he perceived as sensationalization of the Holocaust compared to other mass deaths since World War II. He criticized the prosecution of Robert Faurisson for Holocaust denial, and cast doubt on the accuracy of Filip Müller's book Eyewitness Auschwitz. He met Noam Chomsky during the 1970s and presented his editor Pierre Guillaume for publication.

Thion has been described as a Holocaust denier, and in November 2000 was dismissed from CNRS for Holocaust denial activities.

He was condemned and fined for defamation by the French Correctional Tribunal Court of Appeal in December 2002 for attacks on writer Didier Daeninckx. Thion attended the 2006 International Conference to Review the Global Vision of the Holocaust in Iran, often described as a Holocaust denial conference.

Israeli philosopher Elhanan Yakira has cited Thion and his friend Alain Guionnet, as one of a number of deniers on the radical left (and right) in France whose extreme views on the Holocaust have made Holocaust denial "a central issue in France and elsewhere".
