= Olivia Zemor =

French political activist (born 1948)

Olivia Zemor (born 1948) is a French political activist who is the co-founder and leader of CAPJPO-EuroPalestine, former CAPJPO (Coordination des Appels pour une Paix Juste au Proche-Orient; Coordination Group Calling for a Just Peace in the Middle East), a group which is commonly known as just EuroPalestine.

Zemor, who describes herself as an “anti-Zionist Jew” or “Jewish humanist” committed to the Palestinian cause, maintains that Israel seeks the extinction of the Palestinian people and that it denies Palestinians their human rights. She has been denied entry into Israel for security reasons on several occasions. Zemor is of Turkish and Algerian ancestry.

== Career ==
=== Journalism ===
From 1980 to 1989, Zemor worked as a journalist for Agence France-Presse. She later founded APM International, a news agency that was bought by Reuters in 1999.

== Activism ==
=== Founding of EuroPalestine ===
In 2002, Zemor co-founded EuroPalestine, which describes itself as being engaged in consciousness-raising activities which seek to enlighten the media, politicians, and the general public about the denial of rights and justice to the Palestinian people, and the need to impose sanctions on Israel in order to compel it to respect international law.

=== Librarie Résistances ===
Zemor and Shahshahani also own a Paris bookstore called Librarie Résistances. It is the site of many EuroPalestine meetings and events.

=== 2004 European Parliament elections ===
In the 2004 European Parliament elections, EuroPalestine ran a slate of 28 candidates in one French district, Ile-de-France, with Zemor at No. 4 on the list, following a surgeon, Christophe Oberlin, who "regularly conducts missions to Gaza," at #1, and comedian Dieudonné at #2. Reportedly, the Palestinian Delegate General to France, Leila Shahid, was "shocked" by the extremism of some of EuroPalestine's candidates. According to a Brookings Institution report, EuroPalestine's list "only received 50,000 votes overall (or 1.83 percent), far short of the number required to secure representative in Brussels, but it did much better in certain area of Ile-de-France, at times surpassing the Greens and the Communist Party in poor neighborhoods. In its best showings, the Euro-Palestine got 10.75 percent in the small city of Garges-lès-Gonesse (Val d'Oise); 8.1 percent in Villetaneuse (Seine-Saint-Denis), 19 percent in the Val-Fourré neighborhood of Mantes-la-Jolie (Yvelines), famous for urban unrest and revolts in the 1990s and again in 2005; and 20.33 percent in the Luth neighborhood in the Genevilliers (Hauts-de-Seine)."

=== Ariel Sharon's 2005 visit to France ===
After the French Minister of Foreign Relations announced that Ariel Sharon would be visiting France in April 2004, EuroPalestine launched a campaign protesting the visit. Sharon's trip was cancelled. In Zemor's view, however, "the French government kept making concessions to Israel" and Nicolas Sarkozy, Jean-Pierre Raffarin and Michel Barnier were "astonishingly submissive to Israel and its Prime Minister Ariel Sharon, who did not miss a chance to insult France and the French." She accused the French government of having a "double standard," in that it "supports the creation of a Palestine State and welcomes a dying Arafat" but also "encourages Israel's colonial and annexation policy."

Chirac then invited Sharon to come to France following the 2005 Bastille Day celebrations. Zemor organized a large demonstration against the visit that took place in Paris on July 9, 2005. In an interview a few days before the protest, she complained that the French media were pro-Israel, saying that even "newspapers that define themselves as 'progressive', such as Le Monde and Libération,...refuse to give space to Israelis such as Tanya Reinhart, Emmanuel Farjoun and Ilan Ppappe, who openly oppose Israel's colonial policy," or to cover abuses committed by "far-right Zionist groups like Betar and the Jewish Defense League." She further charged that "pro-Israeli pressure groups in France" have support in the media and government. She also maintained that Israel "wants the war to be extended in Iraq, Iran, Syria and Lebanon so that it can go on with the elimination of as many Palestinians as possible."

=== 2009 video about Israel ===
In a YouTube video that was uploaded in 2009, Zemor complained about the harassment and character defamation she claims to have endured at the hands of the Israelis.

=== 2009 About Hamas ===
In 2009, Zemor added her name, on behalf of EuroPalestine, to a list of those calling for Hamas to be removed from the European Union Terror List. The campaign was initiated by Nadine Rosa-Rosso, a self-proclaimed "communist militant."

=== 2010 expulsion from Israel ===
In December 2010, Zemor was taken into custody upon arrival at Ben Gurion airport. After being interrogated and detained, she was told that she would be expelled from Israel because of her organization of demonstrations in France. Zemor protested that she defends "ideas of peace and justice" and asked: "In what way do my activities in France have anything to do with you?" She was then driven in a police van to a detention center at the airport, where her belongings were confiscated.

Some time later she was taken to board a plane. Her request to see a lawyer was denied, and she was handcuffed. "Carried by four policemen," she later wrote, "I arrive at the top of the gangway of a Turkish Airline plane that is ready to take off. The passengers are already seated. I scream that I refuse to get into the plane. I struggle. The crew refuse to force me to board the plane. I am returned to the detention center." She was placed in solitary confinement and visited by the French Vice-Consul. Eventually she boarded a plane for Istanbul.

=== 2011 court appearance ===
In June 2011, Zemor was ordered to appear before a Paris court for publishing a BDS video against Israel on the website of EuroPalestine. The video features pro-Palestinian activists dancing in a supermarket in Évry, near Paris, wearing T-shirts with pro-BDS slogans on them. Zemor claimed in her defense that she was not actually in the video, but had only published it on the internet. Zemor was charged by the government and four Israeli associations, including the Israeli Chamber of Commerce, with discrimination against the Israeli nation and incitement to racial hatred, but was acquitted on July 8. Ruling that it is not illegal in France to call for a boycott of Israeli products, the court wrote that "Criticism of a State or its policies cannot be regarded, in principle, as infringing the rights or dignity of its nationals, without seriously affecting freedom of expression."

On May 24, 2012, however, the Cour de Cassation (France's Supreme Court) ruled that calls to boycott Israeli products constitute discrimination and are thus illegal. The French Appeals Court, moreover, found Zemor guilty of "provoking hatred or violence against a group of people, Israeli producers, because they belong to a particular nation, the State of Israel." Specifically, the Appeals Court found that "in choosing to distribute outrageous remarks, and most notably the declaration that buying an Israeli product amounts to killing a Palestinian child with a bullet, Zemor incited hatred and violence." Zemor was compelled to pay a one-euro fine to the National Bureau of Vigilance Against Anti-Semitism (BNCVA), and to cover 1500 euros in legal fees. This decision has been severely criticized by the Human Rights European Court who condemned France for damages

=== 2012 JDL attack ===
On June 28, 2012, Zemor was attacked at a café in Bastille by members of the Jewish Defense League who struck her in the head and sprayed her in the face with toxic oil paint.

=== Denied entry into Israel ===
On at least three occasions, in July 2011, April 2012 and August 2012, Zemor has attempted to enter Israel and has been denied entry.

On July 8, 2011, Zemor led a large group of Frenchmen who were scheduled to carry out a "flytilla" from Paris to Tel Aviv on their way to Bethlehem to take part in the "Welcome to Palestine" initiative, a campaign to protest Israeli policies and demonstrate solidarity with the Palestinians. However, Zemor, along with her followers, was barred from boarding a flight to Tel Aviv at Charles de Gaulle Airport in Paris, because her name was on a list of "undesirable people" that had been circulated to the airlines by the Israeli government.

Accusing Israel of abusing its power and declaring that "Roissy-Charles de Gaulle is under Israeli occupation," Zemor led her colleagues in a protest at the airport. "This is a total circus by the Israeli authorities, who are painting us as criminals, who think we will hijack the plane and go to Gaza," Zemor told the media. Insisting that her group planned only nonviolent activities, she later released a statement calling the moves to prevent activists from reaching Israel "provocative, blackmailing and illegal."

In April 2012 Zemor was again prohibited from flying to Tel Aviv. Leading a group of Frenchmen who were headed to Israel to participate in the second "Welcome to Palestine" initiative, she managed to fly from Paris to Istanbul but was prevented, along with her contingent, from boarding the connecting flight to Tel Aviv. "Welcome to Palestine" organizers had expected approximately 2,000 activists to take part in the campaign, but only hundreds made it to Ben Gurion, and only an estimated 12 persons actually made it to Bethlehem.

"We have been squatting here to protest and to get our money back," Zemor told a reporter in Istanbul. "We wanted a piece of paper stating that we were denied boarding, and we finally got it," she said. "Now we are asking Turkish Airlines to pay our return ticket." She added that "I think the Israeli government is just crazy because it would have been easy to let us go to Bethlehem," where, she claimed, the group had planned to build a school and participate in other such activities. Although Israeli police described the "Welcome to Palestine" activists as hostile and provocative, Zemor said that her fellow participants were not activists but were simply people aged from nine to 83 who opposed the occupation, among them her 23-year-old daughter Adele. "They want a free Palestine. They want Israelis and Palestinians to live in peace with equal rights," she said. "They have wanted to meet Palestinians and to go to Palestine to tell them they support their struggle for freedom, but they were scared to do it alone."

In August 2012 Zemor and around 100 other anti-Israel activists tried to enter the West Bank via Jordan. The group tried to travel across King Hussein bridge, but were stopped at an Israeli checkpoint. "We were on two buses," Zemor told a reporter. "They took all passports and stamped 'rejected' for everyone, without questioning or even inspecting the things we have. They did not even allow the second bus to reach the checkpoint. They sent them back immediately." She added that "If Israel prevents us from entering, they need to say why. Is it because we are not agreeing with [Israeli Prime Minister] Netanyahu's policy?" In addition, she said, "Considering the way Israel treats the Palestinians, we are not surprised. Israel claims to be the only democracy in the region, but in fact it is only a prison, where even visitors are not allowed to enter."

Zemor told reporters in Amman that her group had planned "to deliver 1 ton of school supplies to Palestinian children in refugee camps in Bethlehem. In a statement, Israel's Defense Ministry denounced her and her protesters as provocateurs and known troublemakers" and called their effort a failed publicity stunt. The Defense Ministry explained that Israel exercised its right to deny them entry. There are no restrictions whatsoever on bringing in school supplies, the statement said. If these activists sincerely wanted to bring in school supplies, they had countless options to do so. There are no shortages of school supplies in the West Bank".

=== December 2012 Gaza visit ===
Zemor led a group of about 100 EuroPalestine members who were hosted by Hamas officials during a visit to the Gaza Strip on December 27, 2012. The EuroPalestine members had entered the Gaza Strip via the Rafah crossing and sought to break what they described as the "illegal siege of the Gaza Strip." Headed by Zemor, the group held a display near the border fence and promised to promote Hamas's political agenda in France and elsewhere. They also met with senior PFLP officials and with representatives of other terrorist organizations. Zemor said the purpose of the visit was to send the message to the international community that Israel's "siege" of the Gaza Strip and the West Bank was illegal and had to be reversed. Zemor and her colleagues were also taken on Hamas-organized visits to the Al-Shifaa hospital and various places that had been the targets of IDF attacks during Operation Pillar of Defense, which Zemor and her colleagues described as indicative of Israel's determination "to damage the civilian infrastructure."

=== 2013 UEFA protest ===
Zemor led a group of EuroPalestine members who occupied the Union of European Football Association (UEFA) offices in Switzerland in January 2013. She met with UEFA president Michel Platini, telling him that UEFA was "encouraging war crimes" by choosing Israel to host the eight-nation event in June, and that it as a "shame to grant Israel this honor." After Zemor and her colleagues left, Platini cited a letter he had recently received from the president of the Palestinian football association, Jibril Rajoub, thanking him for his support in getting young men released from prison. "The people that came here today were not fully aware of what we do."

== Condemnation in Court ==
On May 17, 2012, Zemor has been condemned by a French high court (Cour d'appel de Paris) as « guilty of provoking hate against a group, the Israeli producers, because they belong to a nation, the State of Israel.»

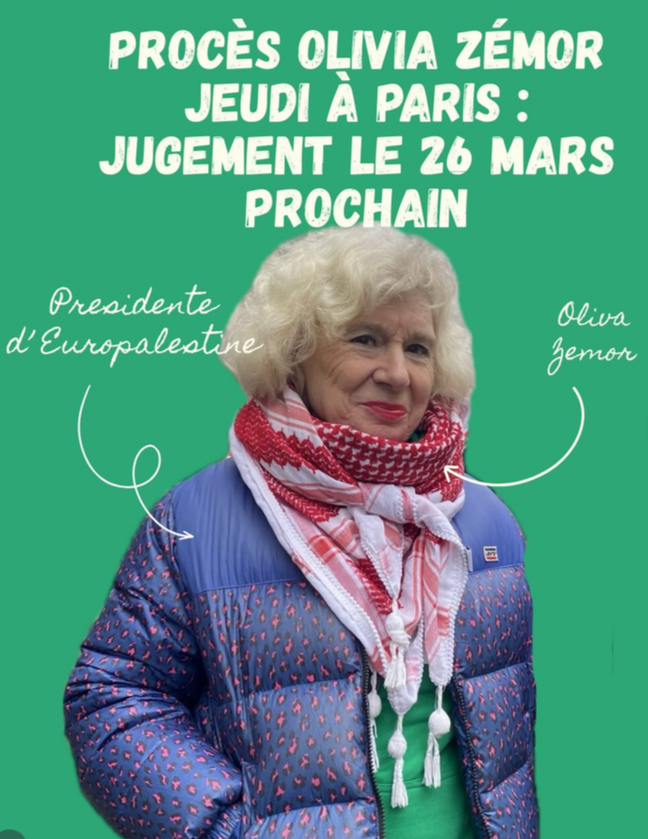
Olivia Zémor's Trial

On Thursday, March 26, 2026, the Paris Judicial Court sentenced Olivia Zémor to a 24-month suspended prison term, registration in the automated judicial database of terrorist offenders, 3,000 euros in damages, 2,000 euros in court costs, and a five-year ban on holding public office. Prosecuted for “glorifying terrorism” following the publication of two articles on October 7 and 8, 2023, on the EuroPalestine website, Olivia Zémor stated upon leaving the courthouse that she had, "of course, appealed this sentence against an activist working in solidarity with the Palestinian people".
