= Association des anciens amateurs de récits de guerre et d'holocauste =

French Holocaust denial organization

AAARGH (Association des Anciens Amateurs de Récits de Guerres et d'Holocaustes, English: Association of longstanding Fans of War and Holocaust Stories) is a French association which was founded in 1996. It publishes and circulates texts and writings from mainly French and German Holocaust deniers in different languages on the Internet, including Robert Faurisson, Germar Rudolf, the right-wing politician and former NPD member Günter Deckert, and Argentine Norberto Ceresole.

The Internet sites of the AAARGH were several times shut down by the French courts because their content was judged antisemitic. Since 2001 the website has been hosted by the Belgian right-wing organization Vrij Historisch Onderzoek (VHO). In 2005, a consortium of eight groups, including SOS-Racisme and the Union des étudiants juifs de France ("Union of French Jewish students", UEJF), obtained a court judgment forcing Internet service providers in France to prevent access to the site - the first time a website was blocked in this way under French law. The decision was appealed by the Internet service providers on the grounds that they were not responsible for the content. However, the judgment was sustained. The site is no longer accessible to Internet users in French territory.

The German Bundesprüfstelle für jugendgefährdende Medien (Federal Department for Media Harmful to Young Persons) says that the AAARGH wanted to give denial a serious and harmless image and that their connection to Ahmed Rami indicates an at least superficial link to Islamic Fundamentalism.
