= Siegfried Verbeke =

Belgian revisionist publisher and Holocaust denier (1941–2026)

Siegfried Verbeke (21 June 1941 – 27 June 2026) was a Belgian revisionist publisher and Holocaust denier.

== Life and career ==
Verbeke was born in Antwerp on 21 June 1941. He became a public figure in 1977 when, together with the later Vlaams Blok ideologist and senator Roeland Raes, he founded the Flemish denial magazine Haro. This magazine distributed tapes from various speeches made by Adolf Hitler, Joseph Goebbels, and Hermann Göring. During this period, he also was a member of the Vlaamse Militanten Orde (Flemish Militants Order), an organisation that became notorious for its attacks on immigrants, Walloons, and socialists. The government began dismantling the organisation in 1981 and it had ceased to exist by the 1990s.

At the beginning of the 1990s, Verbeke distributed pamphlets in the Netherlands to people with presumed Jewish names. In 1993, a Belgian court sentenced Verbeke to a one-year suspended prison term for distributing pamphlets belittling the Holocaust. He was also stripped of his civil rights for 10 years (his active and passive right to vote). The next year he circulated a booklet challenging what the authors called "the official version of the Holocaust."

Two years later, in 1995, he hit the headlines again by trying to get political asylum in the Netherlands because he was banned from distributing his material in Belgium.

In 1998, criminal proceedings were launched against Verbeke by the public prosecution of Frankfurt, Germany, for distributing to German addresses the antisemitic pamphlet "Goldhagen and Spielberg Lies", which attacked Daniel Goldhagen and Steven Spielberg. In 2000, Verbeke was ordered to abstain from distributing a brochure co-authored with professor of literature Robert Faurisson that attempted to challenge the authenticity of the Diary of Anne Frank. The next year, Belgian Minister for Culture Bert Anciaux demanded that all Belgian libraries remove any works by Verbeke from the shelves.

In 2004, he volunteered to be exposed to Zyklon B, the poison used in the gas chambers, as an application for the One Million Dollar Paranormal Challenge of the James Randi Educational Foundation. His application was rejected.

In 2004, Verbeke was convicted in Belgium of Holocaust denial and given a year in prison and fined €2,500. On 3 August 2005, he was again arrested at Schiphol Airport in Amsterdam under an international arrest warrant issued in Germany where he was wanted for Holocaust denial and writing internet articles on the subject. He was sentenced to 9 months in prison, and released on 5 May 2006.

On 15 December 2006, he was again arrested on the basis of an arrest warrant from the Court of Appeal in Antwerp, issued 14 April 2005, and was subsequently incarcerated in Belgium.

In June 2008, he was fined €25,000 and sentenced with Vincent Reynouard to one year in prison for denialism.

Verbeke died in Genk on 27 June 2026, at the age of 85.
