= Germar Rudolf =

German convicted Holocaust denier (born 1964)

- Born: 29 October 1964 (age 62); Limburg an der Lahn, Hesse, West Germany
- Education: Degree in chemistry
- Occupations: Author, publisher
- Known for: The Rudolf Report
- Website: germarrudolf.com

Germar Rudolf (born 29 October 1964), also known as Germar Scheerer, is a German chemist and convicted Holocaust denier.

== Background ==
Rudolf was born in Limburg an der Lahn, Hesse. In 1983 he took his Abitur in Remscheid, then studied chemistry in Bonn, graduating in 1989 with a master's degree. As a student, he joined the A.V. Tuisconia Königsberg zu Bonn and the K.D.St.V. Nordgau Prag zu Stuttgart, Catholic fraternities belonging to the Cartellverband. According to the website “Informationsdienst gegen Rechtsextremismus” (Information service against right-wing extremism), Rudolf was in 1985, a member of Schlesische Jugend (Silesian Youth), the youth section of the association The Landsmannschaft Schlesien - Nieder- und Oberschlesien e.V. ("Territorial Association of Silesia - Lower and Upper Silesia"). Still according to the site Informationsdienst gegen Rechtsextremismus, Rudolf participated the year after, at the Reichsgründungskommers (Reich Foundation Parties) of the ultra-nationalist student association Verein deutscher Studenten (VDSt, German Student League). In 1989, he also took on editorial responsibilities in the German newspaper of New Right Junge Freiheit, and was an author in the far-right journals: Staatsbriefe, Sleipnir, Deutschland in Geschichte und Gegenwart. After supporting the CSU/CDU, he became a member of the Republicans, a minor anti-immigrant German political party. After his military service with the German Air Force, in October 1990 he joined the Max Planck Institute for Solid State Research at Stuttgart, where he prepared a PhD thesis.

== The Rudolf Report ==
In 1991, Rudolf began work on a paper entitled Report on the formation and verifiability of cyanide compounds in the Auschwitz "gas chambers" on behalf of the attorney of Otto Ernst Remer, a former Wehrmacht general charged with Volksverhetzung (inciting hatred). In 1993, this work was reported in the media. Rudolf was dismissed when his superiors discovered that he had used stationery from the Max Planck institute to commission the Institute Fresenius to analyze his samples from Auschwitz; the Max Planck Institute asserted that the use of its notepaper to make the request had mislead the testing laboratory into believing Rudolf's work was being done on its behalf. Rudolf sued the Institute for wrongful dismissal; the lawsuit was settled without any monetary compensation, but with an agreement that his dismissal would be treated as a termination by mutual agreement. In 1996, the University of Stuttgart asked Rudolf to withdraw his application for a final PhD examination, or it would be denied, rendering his PhD thesis worthless. The legal basis for this is a German law which allows universities to deny or withdraw academic degrees where the candidate has used his academic credentials or knowledge to commit a crime. Rudolf has no PhD.

Between 1991 and 1994, Hajo Herrmann and other lawyers used Rudolf's Auschwitz report to defend several Holocaust deniers. Rudolf knew his work would be associated with Holocaust denial, but insisted that they had a right to legal defense. Among other things, Rudolf's report claims that only insignificant traces of cyanide compounds can be found in the samples taken from the gas chambers at Auschwitz. However, Richard Green and Jamie McCarthy from The Holocaust History Project, Robert Jan van Pelt from Holocaust Denial on Trial, and Till Bastian in his book "Auschwitz und die 'Auschwitz-Lüge'" have criticized the report, saying that, among other things, like Fred Leuchter in his report, Rudolf did not discriminate against the formation of iron-based cyanide compounds, which are not a reliable indicator of the presence of cyanide, so that his experiment was seriously flawed.

== Criminal convictions ==
In 1995, Rudolf was sentenced to 14 months in prison by the district court of Stuttgart for "inciting racial hatred" via the "Rudolf Report", as Holocaust denial is a criminal offence in Germany. Rudolf avoided prison by fleeing to Spain, England, and finally to the United States. His first marriage was to a German national with whom he had two children, and they settled at Hastings in England, until he and his wife divorced and she returned to Germany with their children.

On 11 September 2004, Rudolf married a US citizen and settled in Chicago; the couple later had a child. He applied for political asylum, or at least for the right not to be expelled, but this was rejected in November 2004 on the basis that the application had no merits and was a case of frivolous litigation. Rudolf appealed against this ruling, and in early 2006 the US Federal Court in Atlanta found that his application to stay in the country was not "frivolous", but upheld the decision that it had no merit. On 14 November 2005, Rudolf was deported to Germany where he was wanted for incitement of racial hatred (Volksverhetzung). On arrival there, he was arrested by the police and transferred to a prison in Rottenburg, then to another in Stuttgart in Baden-Württemberg.

On 15 March 2007, the Mannheim District Court sentenced him to two years and six months in prison for inciting hatred, disparaging the dead, and libel. Rudolf accepted the verdict, and copies of his "Lectures on the Holocaust" were confiscated. He was released from prison on 5 July 2009 and emigrated to the US to join his wife and daughter, acquiring a green card and obtaining permanent residence status.

In July 2019, Rudolf was arrested near his home in Red Lion, Pennsylvania for "open lewdness" after being found at 4:06 a.m. in a public park "naked from the waist down;" he asserted that he was there exercising. He was later found guilty of indecent exposure and open lewdness, for which he was sentenced to two years of probation. On August 12, 2022, he was charged with trespassing on school grounds and disorderly conduct, and two weeks later on August 26 he was charged a second time with trespassing on school grounds; he plead guilty to those charges. He and his wife have divorced, a change that could prejudice his immigration status in the US.

== Publications ==
After Rudolf was dismissed from the Max Planck Institute, he began to publish books promoting Holocaust denial. He founded Castle Hill Publishers in 1997 based in Hastings, England with Theses & Dissertations Press as its American outlet. In 2000, Rudolf initiated an English language Holocaust Handbooks Series, a series of Holocaust denial titles which, as of 2013, encompassed 25 titles. Furthermore, Rudolf is closely associated with the Belgian Holocaust denial organization Vrij Historisch Onderzoek (VHO). He also runs the VHO's website which is interlinked with the website of Bradley Smith's Committee for Open Debate on the Holocaust (CODOH). Until his arrest in late 2005, he published the now defunct "Vierteljahreshefte für freie Geschichtsforschung" (Quarterly journal for free historical research), described by the German Office for the Protection of the Constitution as "a right-wing extremist organ."

== Selected publications ==
- Auschwitz-Lies: Legends, Lies, and Prejudices on the Holocaust, with Carlo Mattogno (Theses & Dissertations Press, 2005), ISBN 1591480213
- Dissecting the Holocaust: The Growing Critique of Truth and Memory (Theses & Dissertations Press, 3rd edition, 2003), ISBN 0967985625
- The Rudolf Report: Expert Report on Chemical and Technical Aspects of the Gas Chambers of Auschwitz (Theses & Dissertations Press, 3rd edition, 2003), ISBN 096798565X
