= Pierre Guillaume =

French activist (1940–2023)

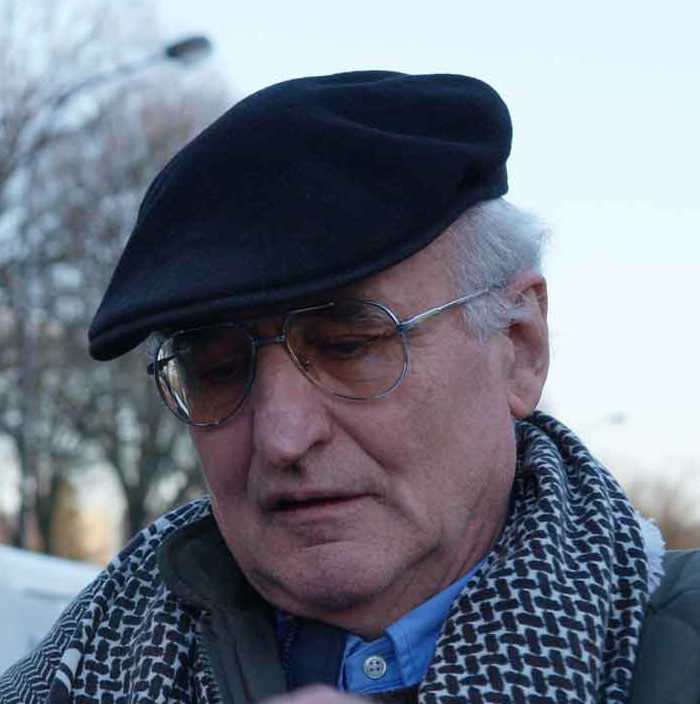
Pierre Guillaume (2003)

Pierre Guillaume (22 December 1940 – 11 July 2023) was a French political activist and publisher. He was born in Rambervillers and died in Ambernac.

He was the founder of the Paris book shop La Vieille Taupe in 1965 and later the Holocaust denying publishing house of the same name. A former member of Socialisme ou Barbarie, he moved to Pouvoir Ouvrier with Jean-François Lyotard and Pierre Souyri.

== Biography ==
Guillaume's name is associated with La Vieille Taupe, which was an ultra left bookstore founded in 1965 and closed in 1972. The name was taken over by Guillaume, Serge Thion and Alain Guionnet in 1979 for the distribution of Holocaust denial books and the Bordigist pamphlet, Auschwitz, or the great alibi.

From 1957 to 1959, he prepared for archery at the École spéciale militaire de Saint-Cyr at the Prytanée National Militaire, and became eligible, but changed his mind. He joined Socialisme ou Barbarie, without playing a "remarkable role" according to the account of Cornelius Castoriadis. He fought in the Algerian War. In 1965, with the help of Jacques Baynac, he opened La Vieille Taupe bookstore, which was linked to the group Pouvoir ouvrier, a French ultra-left group sharing a critical stance to Marxism as Socialisme ou Barbarie from whom they had split in 1963.

In 1980, Guillaume edited the Noam Chomsky essay "Some Elementary Comments on the Rights of Freedom of Expression" and the 1996 Roger Garaudy book The Founding Myths of Modern Israel.

The politics of Guillaume and other ultra-left Holocaust deniers (including Serge Thion and Paul Rassinier) have been characterized as "anarcho-Marxist". According to Alain Finkielkraut, Guillaume's commitment to Holocaust denial stemmed from his ultra-left politics, rather than from antisemitism. The genocide of the Jews was seen by Guillaume and others as a distraction from class struggle, and as playing into the hands of Zionist and Stalinist ideologies, and was hence denied.

== See also ==
- Guy Debord
- Robert Faurisson
- Gérard Lebovici
