= Robert Faurisson =

French academic and Holocaust denier (1929–2018)

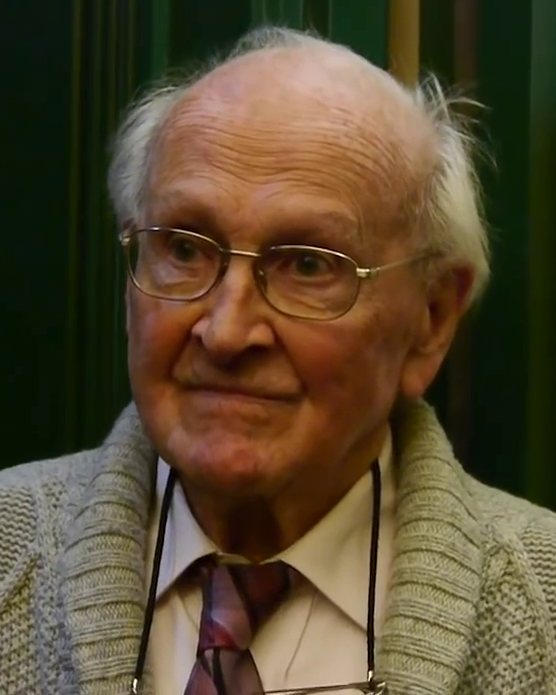
- Faurisson in 2014
- Born: Robert Faurisson Aitken; 25 January 1929; Shepperton, Middlesex, England
- Died: 21 October 2018 (aged 89); Vichy, Allier, France
- Occupation: Professor of literature
- Known for: Holocaust denial
- Criminal charges: Convicted of Holocaust denial in a French court

Robert Faurisson (French: [foʁisɔ̃]; born Robert Faurisson Aitken; 25 January 1929 – 21 October 2018) was a British-born French academic who became best known for Holocaust denial. Faurisson generated much controversy with several articles published in the Journal of Historical Review and elsewhere, and by letters to French newspapers, especially Le Monde, which contradicted the history of the Holocaust by denying the existence of gas chambers in Nazi death camps, the systematic killing of European Jews using gas during the Second World War, and the authenticity of The Diary of Anne Frank. After the passing of the Gayssot Act against Holocaust denial in 1990, Faurisson was prosecuted and fined, and in 1991 he was dismissed from his academic post.

== Early life and education ==
Faurisson is believed to be one of seven children born in Shepperton, Middlesex, England to a French father and a Scottish mother.

He studied French, Latin and Greek literature (Lettres classiques), and passed the agrégation (the highest competitive examination to qualify to be a secondary school teacher) in 1956. He became a high school teacher at Vichy.

In Vichy, as a young teacher, he gained attention when he published an interpretation of Rimbaud's Sonnet des voyelles as an erotic text. Around 1960, he developed political sympathies for the colonialist cause in Algeria (the Algérie française movement), and was arrested in the belief he was a member of the "OAS", a terrorist organisation.

While teaching, he worked on a PhD thesis about the poet Lautréamont. He obtained his doctorate in 1972. The methodology of Faurisson was challenged during the defense of his thesis. The president of the jury, Jacques Robichez, declared: "Finally, I point out […] to the candidate that the method of reading the text as it is written; systematically ignoring the context, not taking into account the historical environment reflected by the language, is an unsustainable bias". In a 2021 book, the historian Stephanie Courouble-Share said that Faurisson's "literary method" would be repeated later when he wrote about the gas chambers. Faurisson became a lecturer, and then professor of French literature at the University of Lyon in 1973.

== Holocaust denial ==
In 1974, Faurisson contacted Yad Vashem with a lengthy letter detailing a variety of arguments which he claimed demonstrated that there had been no genocide of Jews during World War II. These assertions were based on his own interpretation of archival records and his skepticism about the assertions and testimony of various historical figures, including Nazi officials such as Rudolf Höss.

He became involved with the Institute for Historical Review during the 1970s, lecturing and publishing prolifically. He gave a lecture at the headquarters of the National Alliance (the American neo-Nazi party) outside of Washington, on September 14, 1979. He twice testified in defense of Canadian-German Holocaust denier and Neo-Nazi Ernst Zündel, and his testimony has been associated with laying the groundwork for the "Leuchter Report", an influential Holocaust-denial publication. Faurisson's activism garnered him several dedicated critics, including the Jewish French historian Pierre Vidal-Naquet.

=== The Diary of Anne Frank ===
In 1978, Faurisson authored a French-language text, "The Diary of Anne Frank – Is It Authentic?". It appeared in Dutch-language translation in 1985, with the modified title, "The Diary of Anne Frank – A Forgery". The text questioned the credibility of various elements in The Diary of Anne Frank.

The website of the historian Deborah Lipstadt, Holocaust Denial on Trial, argues that Faurisson's treatise ignored details within Anne Frank's account that explain the aspects he deemed implausible, as well as observable details within the Anne Frank House.

Faurisson interviewed Otto Frank in researching the piece, though much of what Faurisson asserted Frank had said was later contradicted by Frank himself. Faurisson's writing on the subject first came into the spotlight during a court case between Otto Frank and Heinz Roth, a publishing-house owner responsible for the circulation of various neo-Nazi writings, including several publications impugning the authenticity of Anne Frank's diary; Faurisson's writing on the subject was entered into the court record as an expert opinion in defense of Roth. The 1978 finding of the court was that Roth must refrain from publishing any further reading material claiming the diary was a fraud.

=== Faurisson affair ===
During the Faurisson affair (1978–1979), the university administration suggested distance learning for Faurisson, although he was still attached to the university. In 1984, the president of the university forbade him to use the university letterhead in his private correspondence.

One of Faurisson's works, Mémoire en défense, was published in 1980, prefaced by an essay by Noam Chomsky. While Chomsky had given general approval for his essay to be reproduced by others, it was included without his knowledge. Chomsky's piece was a general defense of freedom of speech, including that of Faurisson. Chomsky stated that "I see no anti-Semitic implications in denial of the existence of gas chambers, or even denial of the Holocaust. ... I see no hint of anti-Semitic implications in Faurisson's work," and considered Faurisson as a "relatively apolitical liberal of some sort". Chomsky was accused of supporting Faurisson, rather than defending his right to free speech, which Chomsky denied. Noting that he had described the Holocaust as "the most fantastic outburst of collective insanity in human history", Chomsky argued that his views were "diametrically opposed" to those of Faurisson on the subject.

=== Legal and other consequences ===
Faurisson was fined by a French court in 1983, for having declared that "Hitler never ordered nor permitted that anyone be killed by reason of his race or religion."

In September 1989, Faurisson was beaten by unknown assailants claiming to be "The Sons of the Memory of the Jews", an organization about which nothing has been discovered either before or since the incident. Faurisson had been walking his dog in a park in Vichy and was kicked and punched by three young men, breaking his jaw.

Shortly after the Gayssot Act—a statute that prohibited Holocaust denial—was enacted in 1990, Faurisson was convicted of Holocaust denial in a French court. In 1991, Faurisson was removed from his university chair under the Gayssot Act on the basis of his denialist views. He challenged the statute as a violation of international law, specifically the International Covenant on Civil and Political Rights, at the Human Rights Committee. Faurisson filed a complaint with the United Nations Human Rights Committee in 1993; in 1996, the Committee rejected Faurisson's claim that France's prosecution of him was a violation of the First Optional Protocol to the International Covenant on Civil and Political Rights. The Committee upheld the Gayssot Act as "serv[ing] the respect of the Jewish community to live free from fear of an atmosphere of anti-semitism" and necessary "to serve the struggle against racism and anti-semitism".

He challenged the statute as Faurisson was charged again in a trial on 11 July 2006. He was accused of denying the Holocaust in an interview with the Iranian television station "Sahar 1" in February 2005. On 3 October 2006, he was given a three-month probationary sentence and fined €7,500 for this offence.

=== Later life ===
In December 2006, Faurisson gave a speech at the International Conference to Review the Global Vision of the Holocaust, which was sponsored by the government of Iran.

Over the years, Faurisson was superseded among French holocaust deniers by Roger Garaudy, who was considered more accessible. Faurisson's falling out with several other Holocaust deniers contributed to his eclipse. Later on, as Garaudy fell ill, Faurisson regained prominence. Beginning in late 2008, Faurisson became close to the comedian and political activist Dieudonné, appearing with him publicly on stage and in video, and celebrating Faurisson's 80th birthday in his theater. Dieudonné awarded Robert Faurisson an "insolent outcast" prize. The award was presented by one of Dieudonné's assistants, Jacky, dressed in a concentration camp uniform with a yellow badge. This earned Dieudonné a court conviction. In the years that followed and up to Faurisson's death, Dieudonné and writer Alain Soral kept associating with him and introducing his idea to new, younger French-speaking audiences.

On 2 February 2012, Iranian President Mahmoud Ahmadinejad granted Faurisson an award for courage in Tehran, Iran.

== Publications ==
- A-t-on lu Rimbaud ?, Bizarre, no. 21–22, 1961. 2nd edition under the title A-t-on lu Rimbaud ? Suivi de l'Affaire Rimbaud, Paris: J.J. Pauvert, 1971. 3rd edition published by La Vieille Taupe, 1991.
- A-t-on bien lu Lautréamont ?, Paris: Gallimard, 1972.
- La clé des Chimères et autres chimères de Nerval, Paris: J.J. Pauvert, c.1977.
- Mémoire en défense: contre ceux qui m'accusent de falsifier l'histoire, Paris: La Vieille Taupe, 1980.
- (edited by Serge Thion) Vérité historique ou vérité politique : le dossier de l'affaire Faurisson : la question des chambres à gaz, Paris: La Vieille Taupe, 1980.
- Réponse à Pierre Vidal-Naquet, Paris: La Vieille Taupe, 1982.
- "Chronique sèche de l'Épuration – Exécutions sommaires dans quelques communes de Charente limousine", Revue d'Histoire révisionniste, no. 4, February–April 1991.
- Réponse à Jean-Claude Pressac, published by AAARGH, 1993
- Écrits révisionnistes (1974–1998), 4 volumes, privately printed, 1999.
- (With Siegfried Verbeke) Het «Dagboek» van Anne Frank : een kritische benadering

== Bibliography ==
- Lipstadt, Deborah E. (1993). Denying the Holocaust: The Growing Assault on Truth and Memory. New York: Plume. ISBN 978-0-452-27274-3
- Fresco, Nadine (Fall 1981) [June 1980, Les Temps Modernes (in French)]. "The Denial of the Dead". Dissent.
- Igounet, Valérie (2012). Robert Faurisson : portrait d'un négationniste (in French). Paris: Denoël. ISBN 978-2-207-25998-6.

== See also ==
- Antisemitism
- Arthur Butz
- Roger Garaudy
- Pierre Guillaume
- Jean-Claude Pressac
