= Jean-Claude Pressac =

French pharmacist and Auschwitz specialist

- Born: March 3, 1944; Villepinte, France
- Died: July 23, 2003 (aged 59)
- Occupations: Pharmacist, historian

Academic background
- Education: Prytanée national militaire Faculté de Pharmacie de Paris

Academic work
- Era: The Holocaust
- Notable works: Auschwitz: Technique and operation of the gas chambers (1989)

Jean-Claude Pressac (3 March 1944 – 23 July 2003) was a French pharmacist by profession, who became a published authority on the Auschwitz concentration camp homicidal gas chambers deployed during the Holocaust in World War II. He was the author of the 1989 book Auschwitz: Technique and operation of the gas chambers among other publications on the subject, which demonstrated the technical possibility of mass killing by gas chambers during the Holocaust, thus debunking many falsehoods promoted by Holocaust deniers.

Pressac's path to this scholarship was singular. Initially drawn in the late 1970s to Holocaust denial through contact with Robert Faurisson, his archival research on site at Auschwitz ultimately convinced him of the reality of the mass killings. He severed ties with Faurisson in April 1981 and reoriented his work toward establishing the technical facts of the extermination. Drawing on blueprints from the Nazi construction office at Auschwitz-Birkenau that had gone unexamined for decades, and working under the auspices of the Klarsfeld Foundation, Pressac produced what became the first comprehensive technical study of the extermination machinery grounded exclusively in material and documentary evidence. His work received a divided reception: while widely praised by historians for its documentary rigour, its cold technical approach drew strong criticism for excluding survivor testimony entirely.

== Early life ==
Jean-Claude Pressac was born on 3 March 1944 in Villepinte, a suburb of Paris, to a family of schoolteachers. He attended the Prytanée military school at La Flèche, and after failing the entrance examination for the Saint-Cyr officer academy, enrolled in pharmacy studies at the Faculté de Pharmacie in Paris, graduating in 1970.

=== Collaboration with Faurisson ===
His interest in Nazi extermination camps dated from the age of eighteen, when reading Robert Merle's novel La mort est mon métier, a fictionalised account of Rudolf Höss, the first commandant of Auschwitz. At twenty-two he travelled to Poland to visit the site. He returned in 1979 while researching a novel, met Tadeusz Iwaszko, the camp archivist, examined photographs and plans, and began pressing for documentary evidence.

Back in France, he made contact with Robert Faurisson and began collaborating with him, lending his technical expertise to their legal defence. Returning to Auschwitz in the summer of 1980 to attempt to demonstrate that Crematorium II could not have functioned as described, his archival research produced the opposite effect: he became convinced of the reality of the mass killings, communicated his doubts to Faurisson, and severed all ties with his circle in April 1981.

== Auschwitz research ==
Having broken with Faurisson, Pressac sought recognition within established Holocaust research institutions. He contacted Beate and Serge Klarsfeld to examine the original photographs for their Auschwitz Album publication, disclosed his prior involvement with Holocaust deniers, and quickly gained their trust. Through their recommendation, he contributed commentary and technical annexes on Crematoria II, III, IV and V to the French edition of the volume, published in 1983.

Around the same time he met Georges Wellers, editor of Le Monde juif, and made contact with Pierre Vidal-Naquet, whose essay against Faurisson had just appeared in Esprit. Through Vidal-Naquet's intervention, he was invited to present at the international conference "L'Allemagne nazie et le génocide juif" at Sorbonne University in July 1982, where he delivered a paper on Crematoria IV and V at Auschwitz-Birkenau. The Klarsfeld Foundation also commissioned a study on the Jews gassed at Struthof. The Struthof Album was published in English in May 1985. From 1983 onwards, the Klarsfelds encouraged him to produce a comprehensive reference work on the technical operation of the Auschwitz-Birkenau gas chambers. The result, a six-hundred-page volume prefaced by the Klarsfelds, appeared in 1989 as Auschwitz: Technique and Operation of the Gas Chambers. This publication established Pressac as a legitimate researcher in the previously unexplored field of mass extermination technology.

Pressac visited Auschwitz Birkenau ten times between 1979 and 1984, according to registered letter from the Auschwitz Museum director Kazimierz Smoleń, sent on 11 September 1985. He used only authentic documents concerning the construction of crematoria and the gas chambers, which originated from the Nazi German office of Zentral Bauleitung der Waffen SS. Museum staff provided him with assistance. Pressac was given access to blueprints which had previously survived unnoticed for decades due to being located in the construction office rather than the administrative offices. The analysis of material proof convinced him that his former views shaped by the Faurisson case were in error. He described his experience dramatically in the 'Postface' of Auschwitz: Technique and operation of the gas chambers, saying that he "nearly did away with [himself] one evening in October 1979 in the main camp, the Stammlager, overwhelmed by the evidence and by despair". Pressac wrote:

In September 1980, Faurisson and Guillaume came to my place to assess the value of what I had been able to pick up in the Auschwitz Museum. I had admittedly been able to take many photographs, which I thought would help Faurisson form a more concrete picture of the site, but I had not been able to bring back any documents ... verification meant trips to Poland and therefore extended over a period of months ... It was therefore decided to devote all efforts to demolishing the Auschwitz gas chambers. If we succeeded in removing this cornerstone of the Birkenau edifice, the rest would collapse with it. It was a desperate solution, but the only logical one compatible with our resources. Faurisson was forced to stake everything on it. I was to redouble my efforts studying the documents concerning the construction of the Krematorien in the hope of finding evidence that homicidal gas chambers had never been installed in these buildings.

— Pressac 1989, p. 550

== Publications ==
Pressac published his conclusions along with much of the underlying evidence in his 1989 book, Auschwitz: Technique and operation of the gas chambers by Beate Klarsfeld Foundation of New-York with translation from the French by Peter Moss.

In his 1993 Les Crématoires d'Auschwitz, he further delineated the operation of the crematoria at Auschwitz, and their integration into the larger Nazi program to eradicate the Jews of Europe. Pressac estimated that some 800,000 people were killed at Auschwitz, rather than the widely accepted figure of 1.1 million.

=== Reception ===
The broader impact of Pressac's research was achieved with his 1993 Les Crématoires d'Auschwitz, published in a translated edition as The Machinery of Mass Murder at Auschwitz. Roger Cohen, reporting for The New York Times, described it as written in a tone as matter-of-fact as an accountant's audit, and noted that its most significant contribution, in the view of several historians, was the new documentary evidence it provided of the mass killing process at a time of growing Holocaust denial. Serge Klarsfeld, who described Pressac's work as the most authoritative account of the criminal technique of the gas chambers and crematoria, was among those who regarded it as a major contribution to Holocaust literature, a view, Cohen noted, widely shared in France following the book's publication in September 1993. Historian Michel Fabreguet noted that Pressac's pharmaceutical background allowed him to analyse the chemical and architectural mechanics of the extermination process in a way that most historians, trained primarily in textual criticism, had been unable to do.

At the same time, the book's cold methodology drew strong criticism. Nicole Lapierre argued that its deliberate exclusion of testimony – on the grounds that human memory is unreliable – amounted to a "science without conscience", which confined to the domain of pure technique at the expense of any human dimension. Claude Lanzmann went further, contending that by insisting on documentary proof and discounting survivor testimony, Pressac had legitimated the very arguments of Holocaust deniers: "I prefer the tears of the barber from Treblinka in Shoah to a Pressac document on gas detectors." Concentration camp survivors and their children in France also reacted with hostility, issuing a statement dismissing the approach as the height of cynicism. Pressac himself was unapologetic about his approach. "Look," he told Roger Cohen, "I am not going to cry like a baby before the Auschwitz crematoria. I wanted proof; I found it. As for the nature of evil, the fact is that most people obey."

Stephen E. Atkins noted that Holocaust deniers pursued Pressac with particular hostility because he had formerly shared their views. The Journal of Historical Review, a pseudoacademic periodical championed by Holocaust deniers, published a piece attempting to debunk his work.

== Works ==
=== Books and chapters ===
- L'Album d'Auschwitz. D'après un album découvert par Lili Meier, survivante du camp de concentration. Paris: Le Seuil. 1983. (with Anne Freyer).
- The Struthof Album. New York: The Beate Klarsfeld Foundation. 1985.
- "Étude et réalisation des Krematorien IV et V d'Auschwitz-Birkenau". L'Allemagne nazie et le génocide juif. Paris: Le Seuil. 1985.
- Auschwitz: Technique and Operation of the Gas Chambers. New York: The Beate Klarsfeld Foundation. 1989.
- "The machinery of mass murder at Auschwitz". Anatomy of the Auschwitz Death Camp. Bloomington: Indiana University Press. 1993. pp. 183–245.

=== Articles ===
- "Les carences et incohérences du Rapport Leuchter", Jour J, la lettre télégraphique juive, December 1988. Read online.
- "Pour en finir avec les négateurs", L'Histoire, 156, June 1992, pp. 42–51.

== Bibliography ==
- Lapierre, Nicole (2009). "L'effet Pressac". Communications. 84 (1): 163–172. doi:10.3406/comm.2008.2513.
