= Pierre Vidal-Naquet =

French historian (1930–2006)

- Born: Pierre Emmanuel Vidal-Naquet; 23 July 1930; Paris, France
- Died: 29 July 2006 (aged 76); Nice, France

Academic background
- Education: University of Nancy
- Doctoral advisor: Édouard Will
- Other advisor: Ernest Labrousse

Academic work
- Discipline: Historian

Pierre Emmanuel Vidal-Naquet (French: [vidal nakɛ]; 23 July 1930 – 29 July 2006) was a French historian who began teaching at the École des hautes études en sciences sociales (EHESS) in 1969.

Vidal-Naquet was a specialist in the study of Ancient Greece, but was also interested (and deeply involved) in contemporary history, particularly the Algerian War (1954–62), during which he opposed the use of torture by the French Army, as well as Jewish history. In February 1971, he participated with Michel Foucault and Jean-Marie Domenach in the founding of the Groupe d'Information sur les Prisons (GIP), which was one of the first French new social movements. He was part of several debates over historiography in which he criticised negationism, and he was a supporter of Middle East peace efforts. To the end of his life, Vidal-Naquet never abandoned his fascination with antiquity.

== Biography ==
Vidal-Naquet's family belonged to the Sephardic Jewish community rooted in the Comtat Venaissin (Carpentras, Avignon). He was born in Paris, and he was raised in a bourgeois, republican and secular environment. His father Lucien was a lawyer, of "Dreyfusard" temperament, who quickly entered the Resistance in order to avoid exile. In June 1940, the family moved to Marseille. Arrested by the Gestapo on 15 May 1944, Vidal-Naquet's father was deported, along with his wife, in June 1944. They were sent to Auschwitz, where they died. At 14 years old, Pierre Vidal-Naquet then hid in his grandmother's house in the Drôme. There, he read a lot, including the Iliad, and came to know his cousin, the philosopher Jacques Brunschwig. He later learnt that the Nazis had made "his father dance," something he would never forget.

After his studies at the lycée Carnot in Paris, he specialised in the history of Ancient Greece, as well as in contemporary subjects such as the Algerian War (1954–1962) and the Holocaust. He read Marc Bloch's Strange Defeat, a book attempting to explain the causes of the defeat during the 1940 Battle of France, which is one of the origins of his vocation as a historian. He discovered surrealism (André Breton, René Char and also Antonin Artaud), and founded a review at 18 years old, along with Pierre Nora, Imprudence. The 1949 Rajk trial definitively took out his will to adhere to the French Communist Party (PCF).

Pierre Vidal-Naquet first taught history at Orléans's high school (1955), before going to then University of Caen (1956–60) and then Lille (1961–62). Reading Dumézil and Lévi-Strauss, he would become a member of the "Paris School", (not to be confused with School of Paris art movement ) originally composed of Jean-Pierre Vernant, Nicole Loraux, Marcel Detienne and himself. Their work would renew approaches to the study of Ancient Greece.

He then worked at the CNRS (1962–64) and was named maître de conférences at the University of Lyon (1964–66). He was then named professor at the École pratique des hautes études, which became the EHESS.

Vidal-Naquet co-authored several books with his colleague and friend Jean-Pierre Vernant. However, although Vernant was a "comrade" of the French Communist Party (PCF), Vidal-Naquet never belonged to any political party, with the exception of the Unified Socialist Party (PSU), which he considered a "mere discussion circle."

Pierre Vidal-Naquet was married and the father of three children. He was also officer of the Légion d'honneur and, in Greece, commander of the Phenix Order.

Pierre Vidal-Naquet was an atheist.

== Activism ==
Pierre Vidal-Naquet defined himself as an "activist historian", and while pursuing his studies never ceased engaging in political struggles and taking part in political committees, etc. A member of the Comité Audin, along with Jérôme Lindon (editor of the Minuit publishing house), he was one of the best known opponents of the use of torture by the French Army during the Algerian War (1954–62). Along with Jean-Paul Sartre and 119 others, he signed the Manifesto of the 121, a call for civil disobedience against the Algerian war. As an anti-colonialist, Vidal-Naquet was opposed to Guy Mollet's French Section of the Workers' International (SFIO) reformist party because of Mollet's support of the First Indochina War and Algerian War.

He was also opposed to the Regime of the Colonels (1967–74) in Greece. He supported peace efforts in the Middle East as well as the Europalestine group. He thus declared: "I consider Sharon a criminal."

With Michel Foucault and Jean-Marie Domenach, on 8 February 1971 he signed the manifesto of the Groupe d'Information sur les Prisons (GIP), which, rather than speaking in the name of prisoners, aimed to give back to them the chance of speaking in their own voice.

Vidal-Naquet was also active in condemning denial of the Armenian genocide. Vidal-Naquet, who had answered or criticized Holocaust negationist Robert Faurisson in several of his works, once employed Faurisson as an example to illustrate "what the Armenian minorities might feel":

Let us imagine a negationist Robert Faurisson as a governmental minister, a Faurisson president of the Republic, a Faurisson general, a Faurisson ambassador, a Faurisson president of the Turkish Historical Commission and a member of the senate of the University of Istanbul, a Faurisson member of the United Nations, a Faurisson responding in the press each time the question of the Jews is raised. In brief, a state-sponsored Faurisson paired with an international Faurisson and, along with all that, a Talaat-Himmler blessed, since 1943, with an official mausoleum in the country's capital.

Vidal-Naquet was one of the first scholars to deconstruct historical revisionism, notably in The Assassins of Memory and Reflexions on Genocide. He was also opposed to the 23 February 2005 French law on colonialism passed by the conservative Union for a Popular Movement (UMP), but which was finally repealed by president Jacques Chirac in the beginning of 2006. Vidal-Naquet also criticized the 1990 Gayssot Act which prohibits revisionist discourse, claiming that the law shouldn't interfere in historical matters. Vidal-Naquet's arguments against legislation relating to historical studies is not, however, a door opened to revisionist speech. He once declared that he would rather name revisionists "negationists", and that he wouldn't engage with them for "simple and scientific reasons. An astronomer doesn't debate with an astrologer. I wouldn't discuss with someone who supports the idea that the moon is made of Roquefort ... it is impossible."

== Criticism ==
While his analyses e.g. of Greek tragedy and the institution of the Athenian ephebia has been favourably received by many French intellectuals, they have been strongly challenged elsewhere, particularly by Italian philologists who, like Vidal-Naquet himself, were favourably inclined towards a Marxist analysis. His structuralist approach has been called ahistorical, his analyses of the texts as lacking in thoroughness and even manipulative, using categories like polysemy and ambiguity which his critics found do not apply.

== Works ==
=== Ancient Greece ===
- Clisthène l'Athénien, 1964 (with Pierre Lévêque) [Cleisthenes the Athenian: An Essay on the Representation of Space and of Time in Greek Political Thought from the End of the Sixth Century to the Death of Plato, Humanities Press, 1996]
- La Grèce ancienne - Du mythe à la raison, with Jean-Pierre Vernant, Le Seuil, coll. Points, 1990
- La Grèce ancienne - L'espace et le temps, with Jean-Pierre Vernant, Le Seuil, coll. Points, 1991
- La Grèce ancienne - Rites de passage et transgressions, with Jean-Pierre Vernant, Le Seuil, coll. Points, 1992
- Mythe et tragédie en Grèce ancienne, with Jean-Pierre Vernant, La Découverte, 2000
- Les Grecs, les historiens et la démocratie, La Découverte, 2000
- Œdipe et ses mythes, with Jean-Pierre Vernant, Complexe, 2001
- La démocratie grecque vue d'ailleurs, Flammarion, coll. Champs, 2001
- Le chasseur noir - Formes de pensées et formes de société dans le monde grec, Francois Maspero, Paris 1981
- Le miroir brisé : tragédie athénienne et politique, Les Belles Lettres, 2002 (new edition)
- Travail et esclavage en Grèce ancienne, with Jean-Pierre Vernant, Complexe, 2002
- Le monde d'Homère, Perrin, 2002
- Fragments sur l'art antique, Agnès Viénot, 2002
- L'Atlantide. Petite histoire d'un mythe platonicien, Les Belles Lettres, 2005; ISBN 2-251-38071-X.

=== Algeria ===
- L'Affaire Audin, 1957-1978, éditions de Minuit, 1989 [nouvelle édition augmentée]
- La torture dans la République : essai d'histoire et de politique contemporaine, 1954-1962, Minuit, 1998 (Torture: Cancer in Democracy, out of print)
- Les crimes de l'armée française Algérie 1954-1962, La Découverte, 2001 (Préface inédite de l'auteur)
- La Raison d'État. Textes publiés par le Comité Audin, La Découverte, 2002 (nouvelle édition du livre publié en 1962 aux éditions de Minuit)

=== Jewish history and revisionism ===
- The Assassins of Memory and Other Essays, articles on Robert Faurisson, Noam Chomsky and revisionism (French: Les Assassins de la mémoire, Le Seuil, 1995)
- Les Juifs, la mémoire et le présent, Le Seuil, 1995
- La solution finale dans l'histoire, with Arno Mayer, La Découverte, 2002

=== Other ===
- Le trait empoisonné, La Découverte, 1993 (about Jean Moulin)
- "A Dangerous Game". Telos 98-99 (Winter 1993-Fall 1994). New York: Telos Press.
- Mémoires t.1 - La brisure et l'attente, 1930-1955, Le Seuil, 1998
- Mémoires t.2 - Le trouble et la lumière, 1955-1998, Le Seuil, 1998
