= La Vieille Taupe =

La Vieille Taupe is a publishing house and bookshop in Paris, France. Between 1965 and 1972, it had a politically ultra-left slant. Since the late 1970s, it became renowned for publishing antisemitic and Holocaust denial literature.

== History ==
The name means Old Mole and comes from a communist conception of the maturation of social forces beneath the surface of society which eventually erupt in revolutionary movements. The bookshop was founded in 1965 in Paris. It was the major source for texts by the Situationist International, Amadeo Bordiga and other ultra-left groups. Marx's Theses on Feuerbach were available as a poster thanks to Guy Debord. The Situationists did much of the fly-posting, and along with the Pouvoir Ouvrier group, who turned up for the opening party.

In 1966, the Situationists fell out with La Vieille Taupe and withdrew their publications. The bookshop continued as a focus of ultraleft activity until its closure in 1972. In 1973 La Vieille Taupe published La gauche allemande: Textes du KAPD, de L'AAUD, de L'AAUE et de la KAI (1920-1922) with La Vecchia Talpa (Naples) and Invariance.
