= Keith Stimely =

American Holocaust denier (1957–1992)

- Born: Keith Bishop Stimely; April 9, 1957; Meriden, Connecticut, U.S.
- Died: December 19, 1992 (aged 35); Portland, Oregon, U.S.
- Education: University of Oregon
- Employer: Institute for Historical Review

Keith Bishop Stimely (April 9, 1957 – December 19, 1992) was an American Holocaust denier, fascist, and journalist. A devotee of fascist writer Francis Parker Yockey, Stimely extensively researched Yockey, and aimed to write a book on him. Stimely was the associate director of the Holocaust denial organization the Institute for Historical Review (IHR) from 1982 to 1983, as well as the editor of its periodical the Journal of Historical Review from 1983 to 1985.

Stimely came into conflict with other IHR members, particularly Mark Weber and Willis Carto, and quit in 1985. After leaving the IHR, he enrolled in graduate studies at the University of Oregon, though failed to receive a degree. While in Oregon, he became increasingly involved with alternative culture and with Adam Parfrey and his fascist Abraxas Foundation. He performed with members of Abraxas as a pianist and started a publicity agency, the KS Agency; he also contributed to Portland alt weeklies, and cowrote a software manual for the program QuarkXPress with David Blatner in 1991, The QuarkXPress Book. He died due to AIDS in December 1992, at the age of 35. Stimely's collection of correspondences and materials were donated to the University of Oregon.

== Early life and education ==
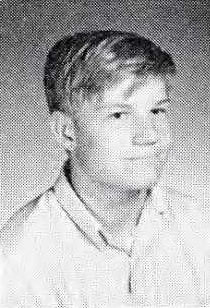
Stimely in 1973, aged 15 or 16

Keith Bishop Stimely was born in Meriden, Connecticut on April 9, 1957. He was largely raised on the West Coast, later Oregon. He had an early fascination with Nazism and Nazi Germany. While in high school, he read an article in the magazine True that discussed Willis Carto and the fascist ideologue Francis Parker Yockey, the author of the fascist book Imperium. This developed into a fixation on Yockey. Stimely later bought a copy of Imperium while on a school field trip, which impacted him significantly.

Stimely first attended San Jose State University, but transferred to and later graduated from the University of Oregon in 1980 with a Bachelor of Science degree in history. His professor Roger Chickering later recalled him as "one of the most interesting, engaging, and challenging students I had at the UO [...] a bright, troubled young man". While undertaking his studies, he embraced Holocaust denial, writing an paper on the subject. He initially couched his antisemitism in euphemism but by the end of his studies he was openly white supremacist.

== Career and activities ==
=== Yockey and the Institute for Historical Review ===
After graduating, he served as a reserve officer in the U.S. Army, serving as a second lieutenant as well as an artillery training officer at Fort Sill. He was also a classical pianist. Stimely was Christian, and was gay. For some time in the late 1970s he worked as a journalist. In his 1978 review of the film The California Reich, Stimely discussed attending a meeting of the National Socialist White Workers' Party. At that time, he contacted several other white supremacist groups in an effort to find people who believed similarly. He applied for membership in an Asatru pagan register and contacted members of several white supremacist groups.

Still fascinated by and devoted to the ideas of Yockey, Stimely aimed to write a book about him, and researched him extensively, in 1980 traveling to the East Coast and speaking with several of his associates. Writer John P. Jackson Jr. described him as an "aspiring neo-Nazi". As part of his research, he filed a FOIA request about Yockey with the Federal Bureau of Investigation, which declassified the files. To research he visited Carto, the leader of the Holocaust denial organization the Institute for Historical Review (IHR), as well as its first director, David McCalden, who connected him with a former Yockey associate, who connected him with others. Through these connections he gathered more information on Yockey. At this time he also met several significant players of the far-right, including the neo-Nazis William Luther Pierce and Ed Fields, as well as IHR members Anthony O'Keefe and Mark Weber. That year, he joined the IHR, and presented a paper on Holocaust denial entitled "‘The Elements of Revisionism: A Historiographic Survey" at their second annual conference.

As part of his research into Yockey, Stimely exchanged correspondence with multiple former associates of Yockey, including Yockey's female associate Elsa Dewette. They became close friends. He also became friends with far-right activist and Yockey associate H. Keith Thompson, who served as a mentor to him. Stimely convinced the IHR to reissue Thompson's book, Doenitz at Nuremberg. When in 1981 Carto fired McCalden, McCalden attacked IHR members and associates, including Carto, Thompson, and Stimely. In his Revisionist Newsletter, McCalden discussed Stimely's homosexuality, making it known to his audience. He also accused him of throwing a party celebrating Adolf Hitler, which offended McCalden. This led to rumors that Stimely was a member of a "gay Nazi cult" within the IHR. In addition to his interest in Yockey, he was also interested in Oswald Spengler, and wrote an essay emphasizing the importance of right-wing writer Lawrence Dennis.

Stimely was a Holocaust denier, denying that any Jews had been intentionally killed as part of an extermination program, though "perhaps up to one million Jews perished from all causes, including malnutrition, typhus, old age, and acts of war." He appeared on radio talk shows advocating this view. The IHR published several short works on Holocaust denial written by him, including $50,000 Auschwitz Reward Unclaimed: "Gas Chambers" Myth Continues to Crumble and the 1981 Revisionist Bibliography. In 1982, he moved to the IHR's location in Torrance, California, and became the assistant director of the IHR from June 1982 to November 1983. After McCalden was kicked out of the IHR by Carto, Stimely became the chief editor of the IHR's periodical, the Journal of Historical Review, from February 1983 to February 1985, succeeding Tom Marcellus. For the IHR he answered correspondences from members and readers of the periodical. He also wrote to David Duke about possible coordination between the IHR and Duke's National Association for the Advancement of White People. Duke later sent him a Christmas card. After struggles faced by the IHR in the area, he moved to Newfoundland, Pennsylvania.

=== Exit from IHR ===
Stimely had a "quarrelsome" nature and grew to find Carto's behavior infuriating, particularly about his control of the Journal and some of his non-Holocaust related conspiracy theories. He also came into conflict with other IHR members over the contents of the Journal. A protracted feud with Mark Weber attracted the most grief. He wrote attacks on several of his associates, including Weber; his attacks also included caricatures of those he was complaining about. Marcellus attempted to get him to stop. Stimely refused. He proceeded to write a 44-page document complaining about Weber. His editing of the Journal also came under some criticism.

In February 1985, Stimely quit the IHR. The apparent final straw was that Carto had, without consulting him, removed part of an article by Robert Faurisson that was critical of David Irving (both Holocaust deniers) from the Journal of Historical Review; he was also aggrieved that Carto had refused to include a Yockey book, The Enemy of Europe, in his Noontide Press catalog because he considered it too anti-American. Stimely proceeded to denounce Carto and say that he had never understood Yockey, writing that "Yockey was, at the bottom of his heart, an artist; Carto is, at the bottom of his heart, a travelling salesman". He wrote a resignation letter denouncing Carto and accusing him of several misdeeds, entitled The Problem of Willis A. Carto or Goodbye to All That!, which was spread among IHR and the journal's circles. This letter was later invoked in legal action against the IHR. Stimely was replaced as editor of the JHR by Robert Berkel; Berkel quit the same position only a few years later after also getting into a dispute with Carto.

McCalden and Stimely had a lengthy feud even after both exited the IHR, and would frequently accuse each other of being homosexuals, deriding homosexuality all the while; McCalden was, like Stimely, gay, and would also later die from AIDS complications, though was less open about it than Stimely. In a letter, Stimely wrote a poem about McCalden's alleged sexual interaction with him.

=== Later activities and the Abraxas Foundation ===
After leaving the IHR, Stimely moved to the East Coast. His exit from the IHR made him something of a pariah among Holocaust denialists, which irriatated him. He planned to organize his own group, the Francis Parker Yockey League, and with it, a journal entitled Thought & Action. These ideas did not come to fruition and Stimely moved back to live on the West Coast. He returned to the University of Oregon as a graduate student, studying American history. While he remained committed to his right-wing ideology, he moved on from solely writing about Holocaust denial and removed "overt references to Jewish world domination from his work"; he wrote to an associate that he was more focused on the decline of Western civilization than antisemitism. He was unable to receive his degree for unclear reasons. In a letter to Thompson in 1986, he declared himself a fascist.

He created a desktop publishing business called UniverCity WorDesign. An early project was to publish a book about Ernst Zundel's legal battles, but after personal disputes with his associate Robert Lenski this also failed to appear. At this time, Stimley was introduced to Adam Parfrey by William Grimstad, with whom he became friends. Stimely became increasingly involved in alternative culture and against the "mainstream" of Holocaust deniers. He became affiliated with Parfrey's Abraxas Foundation, a fascist collective interested in Satanism, Nazism and the taboo, then made up of Parfrey, Boyd Rice, Nikolas Schreck, and later Michael J. Moynihan; they shared his interest in Yockey. He assisted in the creation of the Abraxas Foundation periodical, Wake, and was credited as its "production consultant", the only person credited besides Rice. Scholar Chris Mathews said that Stimely was actually the cofounder of Abraxas.

At this time, Stimely started a press agency, the KS Agency, which promoted a talk given by Parfrey; KS Agency sent out a press release saying Parfrey and his publisher, Feral House, had signed to them. A piece written by Stimely for the Portland-based PDXS promoted a talk by Parfrey. Stimely wrote a Halloween 1991 cover story for the newspaper Willamette Week, an alt-weekly based in Portland, Oregon, where he profiled a local Satanist, Diabalos Rex, also affiliated with the Abraxas Foundation; in 1992, Stimely performed as a pianist during a performance from Rex, Moynihan, and Rice. He also coauthored a software manual for the program QuarkXPress with David Blatner, The QuarkXPress Book. Reviewers noted its comedic tone, and it was listed as a computer bestseller in March 1991 by Publishers Weekly. By this time, he was suffering from AIDS and physically deteriorating. At the time of his death, he had been working on another PDXS piece, this time about the white supremacist Bob Heick.

== Death and legacy ==
Stimely died on December 19, 1992, in Portland, Oregon, due to AIDS. He was 35. He never started the book on Yockey. Parfrey later denied that Stimely had been his publicist and said that he had done so without his permission, and said that he refused to let Stimely work for him, not wanting to be associated with Holocaust denial. Posthumously, after the death of Carto, the Journal of Historical Review printed an article of his again, entitled "Oswald Spengler: An Introduction to His Life and Ideas". Works by Stimely also appeared in the premiere issue of The Occidental Quarterly in 2001.

He gifted his collection of documents and correspondences to the University of Oregon, where it formed the "Keith Stimely collection on revisionist history and neo-Fascist movements". The collection has been used as a research resource on right-wing extremism by several scholars. Writer Kevin Coogan extensively cited Stimely's research on Yockey and his correspondences as a source in his 1999 biography on Yockey, Dreamer of the Day. Coogan wrote of Stimely that he had managed to surpass the previously established "absolute limit" of "Yockeyism".

== Bibliography ==
- —— (1981). 1981 Revisionist Bibliography: A Select Bibliography of Revisionist Books Dealing with the Two World Wars and their Aftermaths. Torrance: Institute for Historical Review.
- —— (1983). $50,000 Auschwitz Reward Unclaimed: "Gas Chambers" Myth Continues to Crumble. Torrance: Institute for Historical Review.
- Blatner, David; —— (1991). Roth, Stephen F. (ed.). The QuarkXPress Book (2nd ed.). Berkeley: Peachpit Press. ISBN 0-938151-86-X.
  - Blatner, David; ——; Taub, Eric (1993). Roth, Stephen F. (ed.). The QuarkXPress Book (3rd ed.). Berkeley: Peachpit Press. ISBN 1-56609-067-9.
