= Ditlieb Felderer =

Swedish historical negationist (b. 1942)

- Born: April 23, 1942 (age 84); Innsbruck, Austria
- Known for: Holocaust denial

Ditlieb Felderer (b. 23 April 1942), also spelled Dietlieb Felderer, is a Swedish Holocaust denier. He was an acolyte of Einar Åberg who was as committed to antisemitism as Åberg himself.

== Background ==
Ditlieb Felderer was born 23 April 1942 in Innsbruck, Austria. His family fled German-conrolled territory, first to Italy, then to Sweden.

He was born Jewish but converted to the Jehovah's Witnesses in 1959. He began to research the persecution of Jehovah's Witnesses in Nazi Germany and in the early 1970s, produced a thesis on the persecutions. It had been claimed that 60,000 Jehovah's Witnesses had been persecuted by the Nazis, but Felderer claimed that was more likely around 200. He was excommunicated from the church when his findings challenged the official view of the church. As he took an interest in the Holocaust, he traveled to Auschwitz concentration camp in the 1970s.

Under Sweden's antisemitism laws, he was charged with expressing contempt for Jews and spreading antisemitic material, a crime for which he was sentenced to 10 months in prison. He was the first person in Sweden to receive a sentence of this length for this crime. Founder of the Institute for Historical Review David McCalden supported Felderer during this time.

== Holocaust denial ==
In 1978, in a book published under his own imprint, Bible Researcher, titled Anne Frank's Diary—A Hoax (Swedish: Il Diario Di Anna Frank: Una Frod), he claimed that The Diary of a Young Girl was a hoax. It was later republished by Institute for Historical Review in 1990. In the book, Felderer questions the feasibility that a young girl wrote the diary.

In 1979, he published Auschwitz Exit using the nom de plume Abraham Cohen.

In the 1980s, Felderer began publishing Holocaust porn known as "pornocaust".

In 1981, Felderer was included in a lawsuit against Liberty Lobby, Institute for Historical Review, and Willis Carto brought by Holocaust survivor Mel Mermelstein. IHR had offered a $50,000 reward to anyone who could prove that Jews were killed by poison gas at Auschwitz. Mermelstein, who said his mother and sister were killed by the Nazis, attempted to collect the reward. Mermelstein sought damages of $17 million when the IHR refused to pay.

In 1983, the Swedish government ordered Felderer to undergo psychiatric treatment.

Felderer sent flyers to the staff of the Auschwitz museum in Poland with the title Please Accept This Hair of a Gassed Victim. In 1985, he stood trial in Sweden for sending the flyers and served 10 months in prison.

Felderer was a witness in R v Zundel in which he testified that the gas chambers at Auschwitz were only used for storage. During the trial, attorney for the Crown Peter Griffiths used Felderer's pamphlets to expose the abusive language of negationism. During the defense examination, Felderer was permitted to present slides from his visit to Auschwitz and he testified that Auschwitz had a swimming pool, a dance hall, and a music auditorium. The Toronto Star would report this with the headline "Prisoners at Auschwitz Dined, Danced to Bands Zundel Witness Testified".

Some of Felderer's claims against the validity of Auschwitz as a death camp were that the ovens were manufactured in 1966-1967 and that there were no exhaust chimneys, which would have made them inoperable.

Felderer also claimed the existence of the Treblinka extermination camp was based on hearsay and weak evidence, concluding that its existence was doubtful.

By the mid-1990s, Felderer began to lose interest in Holocaust denial and was ultimately dropped from the IHR editorial board. He moved to the Canary Islands and began publishing pornography.

== Works ==
- Anne Frank's Diary—A Hoax
- Tortured in Sweden

== Bibliography ==
- Atkins, Stephen E. (2009). Holocaust Denial as an International Movement. Bloomsbury Publishing. ISBN 979-8-216-09856-0.
- Barnes, Ian R.; Barnes, Vivienne R.P. (1 January 1981). "A 'revisionist historian' manipulates Anne Frank's diary". Patterns of Prejudice. 15 (1): 27–32. doi:10.1080/0031322X.1981.9969603. ISSN 0031-322X.
- Budick, Emily Miller (2015). The Subject of Holocaust Fiction. Indiana University Press. ISBN 9780253016324.
- "Chipping Away at the Holocaust". Instauration. Independent Voices. Reveal Digital. 5 (11). 1 October 1980.
- Ensel, Remco; Gans, Evelien (2016). The Holocaust, Israel and 'the Jew': Histories of Antisemitism in Postwar Dutch Society. Amsterdam University Press. ISBN 978 90 8964 848 8.
- Felderer, Ditlieb (1979). McCalden, David (ed.). Anne Frank's Diary: A Hoax (David McCalden ed.). Institute for Historical Review. ISBN 91-85560-02-2.
- Gilman, Sander L. (1988). "The Dead Child Speaks: Reading "The Diary of Anne Frank"". Studies in American Jewish Literature (1981-). 7 (1): 9–25. ISSN 0271-9274.
- Greene, Wallace (1984). "The Holocaust Hoax: A Rejoinder". Jewish Social Studies. 46 (3/4): 263–276. ISSN 0021-6704.
- Kaplan, Jeffrey; Weinberg, Leonard (1998). The Emergence of a Euro-American Radical Right. Rutgers University Press. ISBN 978-0-8135-2564-8.
- Kahn, Robert A. (2004). Holocaust Denial and the Law. New York: Palgrave Macmillan US. doi:10.1057/9781403980502. ISBN 978-1-349-52830-1.
- Neander, Joachim (2006). "The Danzig Soap Case: Facts and Legends around "Professor Spanner" and the Danzig Anatomic Institute 1944-1945". German Studies Review. 29 (1): 63–86. ISSN 0149-7952.
- Porat, Dina (2023). "A Forty-Year-Old Campaign: Anne Frank's Diary and the Holocaust Deniers, 1958–1998". Modern Judaism. 43 (3): 243–273..
- Van Pelt, Robert Jan (2016). The Case for Auschwitz: Evidence from the Irving Trial. Indiana University Press. ISBN 0-253-34016-0.
- Wästberg, Olle (April 1984). "Sweden: The Felderer case". Index on Censorship. 13 (2): 2. doi:10.1080/03064228408533683. ISSN 0306-4220.
- Wistrich, Robert S. (2012). Holocaust Denial: The Politics of Perfidy. Hebrew University Magnes Press. ISBN 978-3-11-028814-8.
