= David McCalden =

British far-right activist (1951–1990)

- McCalden in 1980
- Born: 20 September 1951; Belfast, Northern Ireland
- Died: 15 October 1990 (aged 39); El Segundo, California, U.S.
- Other name: Lewis Brandon
- Education: Goldsmiths College
- Occupations: Political activist, publisher, writer
- Known for: Involvement in British politics and Holocaust denial
- Spouse: Virginia McCalden

William David McCalden (20 September 1951 – 15 October 1990), also known by his pseudonym Lewis Brandon, was a British far-right political activist, publisher, and writer, primarily known for Holocaust denial. He became active in the British neo-Nazi scene in the 1970s as a member of the National Front. He was an active member of the Hunt Saboteurs Association and an editor of their journal, but was expelled in 1978 for being a member of the National Front.

After moving to the United States, he was the co-founder of the Institute for Historical Review in 1978 alongside Willis Carto. He became its first director and helped found their Journal of Historical Review. He left or was fired from the IHR in 1981 after getting into a dispute with Carto, founding his own organization, Truth Missions, and periodicals in the aftermath, including his Revisionist Newsletter. He was additionally the founder of an American Unionist organization, the Ulster-American Heritage Foundation (UHAF) and a newsletter, the Ulster American Newsletter.

== Early life ==
William David McCalden was born in 1951 in Belfast, Northern Ireland. He was born to a working class family. He left Northern Ireland in 1972 to study at Goldsmiths College in London. He graduated in 1974 with a Certificate in Education (Sociology).

== British far-right politics ==
McCalden first became involved in British neo-Nazi politics as a member of the National Front. He became a leading contributor to the party journal Britain First. He was a member of the National Union of Journalists, but was expelled for his ties to the far-right. McCalden was a founding member of the National Party.

He was an active member of the anti-hunting organisation Hunt Saboteurs Association (HSA), a member of their national committee, and edited their journal HOWL for a few years. His other works at this time included Beacon, another journal. His involvement made the news due to his far-right involvement, resulting in bad press for the HSA. On 4 June 1978, HSA held a debate and vote on his expulsion at their annual general meeting in Newcastle. Ronnie Lee, the founder of the Animal Liberation Front and a vegan, abstained from voting against him, and criticized the others for voting out a fascist while still eating meat, which he thought was hypocritical. While some opposed his expulsion, McCalden was ultimately expelled.

== Life in the United States ==
=== Willis Carto and the Institute for Historical Review ===
After reading the Holocaust denial pamphlet Did Six Million Really Die?, he shifted towards Holocaust denialism, though he later assessed the book as flawed.

McCalden emigrated to the United States and arrived in California in 1978 to work for the Holocaust denier Willis Carto. He worked on Carto's magazine The American Mercury and for his publishing company Noontide Press. He attempted to adapt the tactics of Noontide to make them more popular on the radical right, encouraging Carto to de-emphasize the more straightforwardly aggressive and racist books they published, to instead focus more totally on Holocaust denial books. At the time, they only published one, The Myth of the Six Million by David L. Hoggan; McCalden despised Hoggan's book, and said that it was "so full of mistakes it was a perpetual embarrassment" to Noontide. Carto refused to stop publishing the more generally racist books, but agreed to increase the focus on Holocaust denial.

The two men also founded the Institute for Historical Review, of which McCalden was appointed the first director. According to the later director of the IHR, Mark Weber, founding it was McCalden's idea. McCalden hoped that the Institute would help to validate Holocaust denial ideas and to make it seem academic in approach. He often used the name Lewis Brandon in these roles. The pseudonym was the name of the first husband of LaVonne Furr, who had inherited the Mercury. He also used the pseudonym Sandra Ross. He helped found their Journal of Historical Review, serving as editor.

As a publicity stunt thought up by McCalden, the IHR offered a $50,000 reward for proof that Jews were gassed to death in the Auschwitz concentration camp. After McCalden declined an acceptance by Auschwitz survivor Mel Mermelstein, a lawsuit against Carto, McCalden, and the IHR was filed by public interest attorney William John Cox. In October 1981, a Los Angeles County Superior Court judge ruled that "this court does take judicial notice of the fact that Jews were gassed to death at Auschwitz Concentration Camp in Poland during the summer of 1944." The IHR were ordered to apologize and pay $90,000 in damages.

McCalden and Carto had a falling out in 1981, and McCalden left the IHR, or was fired by Carto. McCalden wrote that by 1980 he felt like Carto was pressuring him to do things a certain way. In 1982, Carto began to write articles in his newspaper The Spotlight which accused McCalden of being an agent of the Anti-Defamation League (a pattern of Carto's), while McCalden became bitter that Carto did not acknowledge his involvement in the founding of the IHR. Carto eventually declared himself as having been the sole founder of the IHR; McCalden and Carto were thereafter engaged in a "lengthy" and "vitriolic" public and legal dispute for the rest of McCalden's life.

He was married to Virginia McCalden.

=== Unionism ===
While living in the US, McCalden continued to follow British and Irish politics. Aggravated by the pro-Irish Republicanism he encountered in California and by the presence of NORAID, McCalden founded the Ulster-American Heritage Foundation (UHAF) in 1981. He established a newsletter called the Ulster American Newsletter, which had a circulation of about 500. McCalden and his UHAF supporters wrote letters, debated American Irish republicans, and counterprotested NORAID.

The UHAF and his newsletter promoted what scholar Andrew J. Wilson called a "maverick brand of Unionism, which could be as scathing in its attacks on the IRA as it was in deriding what [McCalden] described as 'the quiche-eating liberal bourgeois Unionists of the North Down "Gold Coast."'" He criticized both Protestants and Catholics (McCalden being a staunch atheist) and accused the IRA of "ethnic cleansing". He was for a time a well regarded activist among Unionists, and made regular appearances on television promoting these views; however, when the connection between his Unionism and his far-right ties was made, he lost much favour and other figures cut ties with him as a liability to the cause.

=== Continuing Holocaust denial ===
McCalden went on to found another organization in Manhattan Beach, Truth Missions, which issued two periodicals: David McCalden's Revisionist Newsletter and Holocaust News. According to Kevin Coogan, "McCalden attacked anyone involved with the IHR".

In his newsletter, McCalden outed his former friend Keith Stimely, another Holocaust denier and member of the IHR, as a gay man; McCalden also criticized H. Keith Thompson. Stimely also quit the IHR after also getting into a personal dispute with Carto, though McCalden and Stimely continued to feud for years. Stimely in turn accused McCalden of authoring the notorious Deguello Report. McCalden and Stimely had a lengthy feud, and would frequently accuse each other of being homosexuals, deriding homosexuality all the while. McCalden was, like Stimely, gay, though was less open about it than Stimely; Stimely also died of AIDS complications. McCalden said in a letter to Stimely in 1982 that: "I have learned to spot a fag at 50 meters, mostly for reasons of self-preservation." In a letter, Stimely wrote a poem about McCalden's alleged sexual interaction with him:

Now Ulster one night he got drunk/And went up to Keith (it took spunk)/And said with face red/'Will you with me to bed?'/Thus admitting the truth of his funk [...]/Secondly, did Keith then continue/You've obviously got problems within you/You'll find no help here/To get over your fear/And conquer that self-hate within you.

In 1985, McCalden sued the California Library Association (CLA) for damages for refusing to display his Holocaust denial materials at their conference. The case became a high-profile battle over freedom of speech. A book was authored about the case in 1989, The Freedom to Lie, a debate between two people opposed on the question of whether McCalden should have been able to present the book exhibit.

In June 1989 McCalden, aiming to attend a debate on antisemitism at the Congregation Mogen David Synagogue in Los Angeles, showed up drunk, made several racist comments, and was "physically ejected from the synagogue". He fell through a window and was severely injured; in 1990 he was charged with assault with a deadly weapon, civil rights violations, and property destruction in connection with the incident.

== Death ==
On 15 October 1990, at the age of 39, McCalden died in El Segundo, California, from complications due to viral pneumonia caused by AIDS. He had been suffering from AIDS since November 1988. He had told the subscribers to his newsletter that he had chronic fatigue syndrome. His widow continued the lawsuit against the CLA. He was memorialized in the National Front's Vanguard newsletter.

== Bibliography ==
- Barnes, Harry Elmer (1979). The Barnes Trilogy: Three Revisionist Booklets. Introduction by David McCalden. Torrence: Institute for Historical Review. ISBN 0-911038-56-6.
- —— (1982). Exiles from History: A Psychohistorical Study of Jewish Self-Hate. London: Londinium Press. ISBN 0-906832-02-0.
- —— (1988). The Amazing, Rapidly Shrinking "Holocaust". Manhattan Beach: Truth Missions.
- —— (1988). Trial by Jewry: The Great Holocaust Trials in Toronto 1983 – 1988. Manhattan Beach: Truth Missions.
