= David L. Hoggan =

American author (1923–1988)

- Born: David Leslie Hoggan; March 23, 1923; Portland, Oregon, U.S.
- Died: August 7, 1988 (aged 65); Menlo Park, California, U.S.
- Occupation: History writer

David Leslie Hoggan (March 23, 1923 – August 7, 1988) was an American author of The Forced War: When Peaceful Revision Failed and other works in the German and English languages. He was antisemitic, maintained a close association with various neo-Nazi groups, chose a publishing house run by an unregenerate Nazi, and engaged in Holocaust denial.

== Early life ==
Hoggan was born in Portland, Oregon, and received his education at Reed College and Harvard University. At Harvard, Hoggan was awarded a PhD in 1948 for a dissertation on relations between Germany and Poland in the years from 1938 to 1939, The Breakdown of German-Polish Relations in 1939: The Conflict Between the German New Order and the Polish Idea of Central Eastern Europe. His adviser described it as "no more than a solid, conscientious piece of work, critical of Polish and British policies, but not beyond what the evidence would tolerate". The American historian and chair of the board of the Center for Jewish History, Peter Baldwin noted that it was easily the most reasonable and sane of all Hoggan's writings.

During his time at Harvard, Hoggan befriended Harry Elmer Barnes, whose thinking would have much influence on Hoggan. Subsequently, Hoggan had a series of teaching positions at the Ludwig-Maximilians-Universität München, San Francisco State College, the University of California, Berkeley, the Massachusetts Institute of Technology, and Carthage College. When teaching at the Ludwig-Maximilians-Universität München between 1949 and 1952, Hoggan became fluent in German and married a German woman. Reflecting his pro-German tendencies, Hoggan claimed in a 1960 review of a book by an Austrian writer, Hans Uebersberger, that the assassination of Archduke Franz Ferdinand was a result of a conspiracy involving the governments of Serbia and Russia, and that as such, Austria-Hungary and its ally Germany were the victims of a Russo-Serbian provocation designed to cause a world war.

== Der erzwungene Krieg ==
In 1955, Barnes encouraged Hoggan to turn his dissertation into a book and it was published in West Germany as Der erzwungene Krieg (The Forced War). It blamed the outbreak of World War II on an alleged Anglo-Polish conspiracy to wage aggression against Germany. Hoggan charged that the alleged conspiracy was headed by the British Foreign Secretary Lord Halifax, who, Hoggan contended, had seized control of British foreign policy in October 1938 from Prime Minister Neville Chamberlain, allegedly assisted by Polish Foreign Minister Colonel Józef Beck in what Hoggan called a monstrous anti-German plot. In Hoggan's opinion, after the Munich Agreement an obsessively anti-German Lord Halifax decided to wage a war of annihilation against the German people. Hoggan argued that Hitler's foreign policy was entirely peaceful and moderate, and that it was Nazi Germany that was an innocent victim of Anglo-Polish aggression in 1939:

[Hitler] had made more moderate demands on Poland than many leading American and British publicists had recommended in the years after Versailles. Moreover, Hitler had offered in return an amazing concession to Poland that the Weimar Republic would never even remotely countenance.

The crux of Hoggan's thesis appears in his words as follows:

In London, Halifax succeeded in forcing on the British Government a deliberate policy of war despite the fact that most of the prominent British experts on Germany argued for a policy of German-English friendship. In Warsaw, Beck was prepared to collaborate fully with Halifax's war plans despite the warnings from numerous Poles who were horrified by the prospect of seeing their land destroyed.

German, Italian, French, and other European leaders did all they could to avert the great catastrophe, but in vain, while Halifax's war policy, accompanied by the secret blessings of Roosevelt and Stalin, carried the day ...

The Second World War arose from the attempt to destroy Germany.

Accordingly, Hoggan claimed that Britain was guilty of aggression against the German people. He also accused the Polish government of engaging in what he called hideous persecution of its German minority, and claimed that the Polish government's policies towards the ethnic German minority were far worse than the Nazi regime's policies towards the Jewish minority; and that all of the German anti-Semitic laws were forced on the Germans by anti-Semitism in Poland as – he claimed – German anti-Semitic laws were the only thing that stopped the entire Jewish population of Poland from emigrating to the Reich. He justified the huge one billion Reichsmark fine (equivalent to DM4.5×10^{9} in 2021) imposed on the entire Jewish community in Germany after the 1938 Kristallnacht pogrom as a reasonable measure to prevent what he called "Jewish profiteering" at the expense of German insurance companies and alleged that no Jews were killed in the Kristallnacht (in fact, 91 German Jews died). A particular area of controversy centered around Hoggan's claim that the situation of German Jewry before World War II was extremely favorable to the Jewish community in Germany, and that none of the various antisemitic laws and measures of the Nazis had any deleterious effects on German Jews.

Hoggan noted that as late as 1938 German-Jewish doctors and dentists could still participate in the German national insurance program, and argued that this proved that Nazi anti-Semitism was not that harsh. Critics of Hoggan such as Deborah Lipstadt contend that Hoggan ignored the efforts on the part of the Nazi regime to stop "Aryan" Germans from seeing Jewish physicians and dentists throughout the 1930s, and that in July 1938 a law was passed withdrawing the licenses from Jewish doctors. Likewise, Hoggan cited a September 1938 cable from the American Embassy in Berlin to the State Department, which mentioned that 10% of all German lawyers were Jews, and argued that this proved the mildness of Nazi anti-Semitism. Lipstadt argued that Hoggan was guilty of disregarding the reason for the cable, which was that on September 27, 1938, German Jews were forbidden to practice law in Germany, and of selective quotation since the cable as a whole concerns the discriminatory laws against German Jewish lawyers.

Another area of criticism concerned Hoggan's treatment of the decision to end Judaism as an officially recognized religion in Germany. In Germany, the government had traditionally imposed a religion tax; the proceeds of this were turned over to the individual taxpayer's faith organization. In the Nazi era, Jews continued to pay the tax, but synagogues no longer received the proceeds. Hoggan claimed that this meant that synagogues could not "profit" at the expense of non-Jewish Germans, and falsely presented this move as merely a secularization measure (Christian churches continued to receive the proceeds of the religion tax in Nazi Germany).

In the early 1960s, Hoggan's book attracted much attention, and was the subject of a cover story in Der Spiegel magazine in its edition of May 13, 1964. Hoggan's thesis of Germany as victim of aggression was widely attacked as simply wrong-headed. In regards to his sympathies, it was argued that Hoggan was an ardent Germanophile and a compulsive Anglophobe and Polophobe and an anti-Semite.

Critics alleged that Hoggan had wilfully misinterpreted and falsified historical evidence to fit his argument; further fanning the flames of criticism was the revelation that Hoggan had received his research funds from and was himself a member of several neo-Nazi groups in the United States and West Germany. Another source of controversy was Hoggan's choice of publisher, the firm of Grabert Verlag. This was run by Herbert Grabert, a former Nazi who had led a neo-pagan cult before World War II, had served as an official in Alfred Rosenberg's Ministry of the East during the war, and after the war made little secret of what he regarded as the rightness of Germany's cause during the war. When Der erzwungene Krieg was translated into English in 1989, it was published by the Institute for Historical Review.

In a critical review of Hoggan's book, the British historian Frank Spencer took issue with its claim that all of the incidents that occurred in Danzig (modern Gdańsk, Poland) in 1939 were Polish provocations of Germany egged on by Britain. Spencer stated that all these incidents were cases of German provocations of Poland rather than vice versa, and that the Poles would have defended their rights in Danzig regardless of what British policy was. Likewise, Spencer took issue with Hoggan's claim that the Reich Protectorate of Bohemia and Moravia was a generous German move to offer autonomy to the Czechs, and thought that Hoggan's complaint that it was most unjust that German minorities in Eastern Europe did not enjoy the same "autonomy" that Hitler offered to the Czechs in March 1939 was simply laughable. Spencer also stated that Hitler's order on April 3, 1939, to begin planning for Fall Weiss was not a sign of moderation on the part of Hitler, as Hoggan claimed, and noted Hoggan simply ignored Hitler's instructions to the German Foreign Office's to ensure that all German-Polish talks over the Danzig issue failed by making unreasonable demands on the Poles. In particular, Spencer argued against Hoggan's claim that the German-Soviet Non-Aggression Pact was not designed to partition Poland, but was instead a thoughtful attempt on the part of Joachim von Ribbentrop to persuade Joseph Stalin to abandon the idea of world revolution.

The American historian Donald Detwiler wrote that for Hoggan, Hitler was a basically reasonable statesman who tried to undo an unjust Treaty of Versailles. Detwiler went on to write that Hoggan's book was "false" and "vicious" in its conclusion that Britain was the aggressor and Germany the victim in 1939.

Andreas Hillgruber, one of Germany's leading military-diplomatic historians, noted that there was a certain "kernel of truth" to Hoggan's thesis, in that Hitler and Ribbentrop believed that attacking Poland in 1939 would not result in a British declaration of war against the Reich, but went on to argue that the major point of Hoggan's argument, that Britain was seeking a war to destroy Germany, was simply a "preposterous" misreading of history.

One of Hoggan's leading detractors was the historian Hans Rothfels, the director of the Institute for Contemporary History, who used the journal of the institute, the Vierteljahrshefte für Zeitgeschichte to attack Hoggan and his work, which Rothfels saw as sub-standard pseudo-history attempting to masquerade as serious scholarship. In a lengthy letter to the editor of the American Historical Review in 1964, Rothfels exposed the Nazi background of Hoggan's patrons. Another leading critic was the U.S. historian Gerhard Weinberg, who wrote a harsh book review in the October 1962 edition of the American Historical Review. Weinberg stated that Hoggan's method involved taking of all Hitler's "peace speeches" at face value, and ignored evidence in favor of German intentions for aggression, such as the Hossbach Memorandum. Weinberg also stated that Hoggan often rearranged events in a chronology to support his thesis, such as placing the Polish rejection of the German demand for the return of the Free City of Danzig (modern Gdańsk, Poland) to the Reich in 1939 (it was in October 1938), thereby giving a false impression that the Polish refusal to consider changing the status of Danzig was due to British pressure. On this point, Weinberg noted that Hoggan's account of a meeting between Neville Chamberlain and Adam von Trott zu Solz in June 1939 had Chamberlain saying that the British guarantee of Polish independence given in March 1939 "did not please him personally at all" and that Hoggan "thereby gave the impression that Halifax was solely responsible for British policy". As Weinberg noted, what Chamberlain actually said, in response to Trott zu Solz's criticism of the Polish guarantee, was: "Do you believe that I undertook these commitments gladly? Hitler forced me into them!". More generally, Weinberg stated that Hoggan had appeared to engage in forgery by manufacturing documents and attributing statements that were not found in documents in the archives. Barnes and Hoggan responded with a series of letters, to which Weinberg replied. The exchange became increasingly rancorous and vitriolic; in October 1963 the editors of the American Historical Review announced that in the interest of decorum they would cease publishing letters relating to Hoggan's book.

In a 1963 article, the German historian Helmut Krausnick, who was one of the leading scholars associated with the Institute for Contemporary History, accused Hoggan of manufacturing much of his "evidence". Krausnick commented: "rarely have so many inane and unwarrented theses, allegations, and 'conclusions' ... been crammed into a volume written under the guise of history". Hoggan's former professors at Harvard described his book as bearing no resemblance to the PhD dissertation that he had submitted in 1948.

Another controversy surrounded the decision of two German historical societies to award Hoggan the Leopold von Ranke and Ulrich von Hutten Prizes for outstanding scholarship; many, such as the historian Gordon A. Craig, felt that by honouring Hoggan, these societies had destroyed the value of the awards. The Berliner Tagesspiegel newspaper criticized "these spectacular honors for a historical distortion". The German Trade Union Council and the Association of German Writers both passed resolutions condemning the awards, while the Minister of the Interior in the Bundestag called the awards a "crude impertinence". In a letter, Rothfels commented that most of the people associated with the two historical societies had a "clear-cut Nazi past".

Support for Hoggan came from the historian Kurt Glaser, after examining The Forced War and its critics' arguments in Der Zweite Weltkrieg und die Kriegsschuldfrage (The Second World War and the Question of War Guilt), found that while some criticisms had merit, "It is hardly necessary to repeat here that Hoggan was not attacked because he had erred here and there—albeit some of his errors are material—but because he had committed heresy against the creed of historical Orthodoxy." The German historian and philosopher Ernst Nolte has often defended Hoggan as one of the great historians of World War II. The Italian historian Rosaria Quartararo praised Der erzwungene Krieg as "perhaps still ... the best general account from the German side" of the period immediately before World War II. Hoggan's mentor, Barnes, besides helping Hoggan turn his dissertation into the book Der erzwungene Krieg wrote a glowing blurb for the book's jacket.

In 1976, the book March 1939: the British Guarantee to Poland by the British historian Simon K. Newman was published. Newman's thesis was somewhat similar to Hoggan's in that he argued that Britain was willing to risk a war with Germany in 1939, though Newman's book – based on British archives that were still closed in the 1950s, when Hoggan's was published – differed sharply from Hoggan's in that it was Neville Chamberlain rather than Lord Halifax who was seen as driving British foreign policy. Newman denied there was ever a policy of appeasement as popularly understood.

Newman maintained that British foreign policy under Chamberlain aimed at denying Germany a "free hand" in Europe, and to the extent that concessions were offered, they were due to military weaknesses, compounded by the economic problems of rearmament. Most controversially, Newman contended that the British guarantee to Poland in March 1939 was motivated by the desire to have Poland as a potential anti-German ally, thereby blocking the chance for a German-Polish settlement of the Danzig question by encouraging what Newman claimed was Polish obstinacy over that issue, and thus causing World War II. Newman argued that German-Polish talks on the question of returning Danzig had been going well until Chamberlain's guarantee, and that it was Chamberlain's intention to sabotage the talks as a way of causing an Anglo-German war. In Newman's opinion, the guarantee of Poland was meant by Chamberlain as a "deliberate challenge" to Germany in 1939. Newman wrote that World War II was not "Hitler's unique responsibility" and rather contended that "Instead of a German war of aggrandizement, the war become one of Anglo-German rivalry for power and influence, the culmination of the struggle for the right to determine the future configuration of Europe". Newman's conclusions were controversial in their own right, and historians such as Anna Cienciala and Anita Prazmowska have published refutations of his conclusions.

Based upon extensive interviews with the former French foreign minister Georges Bonnet, Hoggan followed up Der erzwungene Krieg with Frankreichs Widerstand gegen den Zweiten Weltkrieg (France's Resistance to the Second World War) in 1963. In that book, Hoggan argued that the Third Republic had no quarrel with the Third Reich and had been forced by British pressure to declare war on Germany in 1939.

== The Myth of the 'New History' ==
In his 1965 book, The Myth of the 'New History': The Techniques and Tactics of the New Mythologists of American History, Hoggan attacked all of the so-called "mythologist" historians who justified dragging America into unnecessary wars with Germany twice in the 20th century. According to Hoggan, the "mythologists" were Anglophiles, Liberals, internationalists, and "anti-Christians" (by which Hoggan apparently meant Jews). Repeating his argument from Der erzwungene Krieg, Hoggan argued that Hitler was a man of peace who was "the victim of English Tory conspiracy in September 1939 ... Halifax conducted a single-minded campaign to plunge Germany into war and in such a way as to make Germany appear the guilty party". Hoggan again argued that, incited by Britain, Poland was planning to attack Germany in 1939, and went on to argue that Operation Barbarossa was a "preventive war" forced on Germany in 1941. Hoggan blamed the German defeat in World War II on Hitler's reluctance to rearm on the proper scale due to his alleged love of peace, argued that Germany was defeated only because of overwhelming material odds, and praised the "grit and courage" of the Germans in resisting the Allied onslaught against them. In Hoggan's opinion, too many American historians were "slow to grasp the central British role in bringing about either the Second World War and the Cold War". In a review of The Myth of the 'New History', the American historian Harvey Wish commented that the book appeared to be little but an isolationist, pro-German Anglophobic rant about the fact that the United States in alliance with Britain had fought Germany in the two world wars.

== Holocaust denial ==
In following years Hoggan maintained a close association with various neo-Nazi and Holocaust denial groups. In 1969 a short book was published called The Myth of the Six Million, denying the Holocaust. The book had a foreword, by "E. L. Anderson", but listed no author; it was by Hoggan (written in 1960) but published without his permission (it is not to be confused with his The Myth of the 'New History').

The publisher was the Noontide Press, a small Los Angeles-based publisher specializing in explicitly antisemitic literature owned and operated by Willis Carto (apparently the "E. L. Anderson" of the foreword). Hoggan sued Carto in 1969 for publishing without his permission; the case was settled out of court in 1973.

The book was one of the first, possibly the first, in the English language, to promote Holocaust denial. In it Hoggan argued that all the evidence for the Holocaust was manufactured after the war as a way of trying to justify what Hoggan called a war of aggression against Germany. It included an appendix comprising five articles first published in The American Mercury: "Zionist Fraud" by Harry Elmer Barnes, "The Elusive Six Million" by Austin App, "Was Anne Frank's Diary a Hoax" by Teressa Hendry, "Paul Rassinier: Historical Revisionist" by Herbert C. Roseman, "The Jews that Aren't" by Leo Heiman, and a favorable review of Paul Rassinier's work by Barnes.

Its author (Hoggan) was accused of re-arranging words from documents to support his contentions. One of Hoggan's critics, Lucy Dawidowicz, used the example of the memoirs of an Austrian Social Democrat named Benedikt Kautsky, imprisoned at Buchenwald concentration camp and later at the Auschwitz death camp, who wrote: "I should now like briefly to refer to the gas chambers. Though I did not see them myself, they have been described to me by so many trustworthy people that I have no hesitation in reproducing their testimony". Dawidowicz accused Hoggan of re-arranging the sentence to make it sound like Kautsky declared there were no gas chambers at Auschwitz rather than declaring that he had not seen them but only heard of them by hearsay.

In the 1970s, Hoggan turned to writing about American history in German. Hoggan's books about American history, his Der unnötige Krieg (The Unnecessary War) and the Das blinde Jahrhundert (The Blind Century) series, have been described as "a massive and bizarre critique of the course of American history from a racialist and wildly anti-Semitic perspective".

In the 1980s, Hoggan was a leading member of the Institute for Historical Review (IHR) and a featured speaker at its Sixth Conference in 1985. His work has remained popular with antisemitic groups.

== Final years ==
During his final years David Hoggan lived with his wife in Menlo Park, California. He died there of a heart attack on 7 August 1988. Hoggan's last book, published posthumously in 1990, was Meine Anmerkungen zu Deutschland: Der Anglo-amerikanische Kreuzzugsgedanke im 20. Jahrhundert (My comments on Germany: The Anglo-American crusade idea in the 20th century) which detailed what he claimed were Germany's innocence in and incredible suffering in both world wars due to an anti-German Anglo-American "crusader mentality" reflecting "envy" of German economic success.

== Work ==
=== Books ===
- Der erzwungene Krieg. Tübingen: Grabert Verlag (1961).
  - Translated into English as The Forced War : When Peaceful Revision Failed. Costa Mesa, Calif.: Institute for Historical Review (1989). ISBN 0939484285.
- Frankreichs Widerstand gegen den Zweiten Weltkrieg. Tübingen: Verlag der Deutschen Hochschullehrer-Zeitung (1963).
- The Myth of the Six Million. Los Angeles, Calif.: Noontide Press (1969). ISBN 0906879892.
- Der unnötige Krieg. Tübingen: Grabert Verlag (1976).
- Das blinde Jahrhundert: Amerika—das messianische Unheil. Tübingen: Grabert Verlag (1979).
- Das blinde Jahrhundert: Europa—Die verlorene Weltmitte. Tübingen: Grabert Verlag (1984).
- The Myth of New History Techniques and Tactics of Mythologists. Costa Mesa, Calif.: Institute for Historical Review (1985). ISBN 0317385119.
- Meine Anmerkungen zu Deutschland: Der Anglo-amerikanische Kreuzzugsgedanke im 20. Jahrhundert. Tübingen: Grabert Verlag (1990).

=== Articles ===
- "President Roosevelt and the Origins of the 1939 War." Journal of Historical Review, vol. 4, no. 2, Special Issue: Roosevelt and War in Europe, 1938-1940 (Summer 1983), pp. 205–255.

=== Reviews ===
- Review of Oesterreich Zwischen Russland und Serbien: Zur Suedslawischen Frage und der Entstehung des Ersten Weltkrieges by Hans Uebersberger. Journal of Modern History, vol. 32, no. 1 (Mar. 1960), p. 87.
