= Dobson v North Cumbria NHS Foundation Trust =

UK labour law case

- Court: Employment Appeal Tribunal
- Citation: [2021] IRLR 729 (EAT)

Keywords
- Childcare disparity

Dobson v North Cumbria NHS Foundation Trust [2021] IRLR 729 (EAT) is a UK labour law case, concerning the child care disparity that women face.

== Facts ==
Dobson claimed that NHS Trust's demand for "flexible" work at weekends amounted to indirect sex discrimination, because it disadvantaged her in her care for 3 children, two of whom were disabled.

The Tribunal decided there was no particular disadvantage because other women could do it, and so could the only man in the team.

This case will be at the Employment Appeal Tribunal for the second time on 16th December 2025. ………………

== Judgment ==
Choudhury J, reversing the Tribunal, found that the Tribunal was wrong in comparing only people in the team, as the proper comparison would be all people who were required to work flexibly. It was uncontroversial that there was a disparity in child care burdens for women. Tribunals could and should take judicial notice of this matter, even if it is not pleaded.

2. Permission to intervene was given to Working Families, a charity helping parents and carers find a balance between responsibilities at home and in the workplace, in relation to whether the Tribunal ought to have taken judicial notice of the greater childcaring responsibilities of women. Working Families is represented by Ms Darwin and Ms Foubister.

...

45. Mr Sethi contends that judicial notice ought to have been taken of the fact that “women are more likely to be child carers than men”. We were taken to a number of cases where that fact was judicially noticed: a. In London Underground v Edwards (No.2) [1999] ICR 494 (CA), the Court of Appeal agreed with a submission that the tribunal was “entitled to take into account their own knowledge and experience that the burden of childcare falls upon many more women than men and that a far greater proportion of single parents with care of children are women than men.” Potter LJ also stated as follows: “24…An industrial tribunal does not sit in blinkers. Its members are selected in order to have a degree of knowledge and expertise in the industrial field generally. The high preponderance of single mothers having care of a child is a matter of common knowledge. Even if the "statistic," i.e., the precise ratio referred to, is less well known, it was in any event apparently discussed at the hearing before the industrial tribunal without doubt or reservation on either side. It thus seems clear to me that, when considering A as a basis for their decision the reliability of the figures with which they were presented, the industrial tribunal were entitled to take the view that the percentage difference represented a minimum rather than a maximum so far as discriminatory effect was concerned.”

- b. In Essop, Baroness Hale considered that one of the “context factors” relevant to a claim of indirect discrimination may be that “the expectation that women will bear the greater responsibility for caring for the home and family than will men” (at [26]) and at [39], stated as follows:

“39… There is nothing peculiar to womanhood in taking the larger share of caring responsibilities in a family. Some do and some do not. But (in the context of equal pay) it has been acknowledged that a length of service criterion can have a disparate impact on women because they tend to have shorter service periods as a result of career breaks or later career starts owing from their child care responsibilities: see Wilson v Health and Safety Executive (Equality and Human Rights Commission intervening) [2010] ICR 302, following Cadman v Health and Safety Executive (Equal Opportunities Commission intervening) (Case C-17/05) [2006] ICR 1623; [2006] ECR I-9583…”

- c. Similarly, in Chief Constable of West Midlands Police v Blackburn and anor [2008] ICR 505 (EAT), the EAT (Elias P) concluded that disparate impact in relation to a benefit for night working could be established from the fact that the female claimants had childcare responsibilities;
- d. In Shackleton Garden Centre Ltd v Lowe, UKEAT/0161/10 (EAT) (27 July 2010), the EAT (Wilkie J) agreed (at [9] and [10]) that the tribunal had been entitled, “based on what is now well recognised in industrial and employment circles” to conclude that “… the ability of women to work particular hours is substantially restricted because of those child care commitments in contrast to that of men”.
- e. Finally, in Cumming v British Airways Plc UKEAT/0337/19/JOJ (EAT) (22 January 2021), the EAT (HHJ Shanks) stated that:

“12…in the light of Lady Hale’s observations [in Essop], I do not think that there was any need for evidence to show that female cabin crew (like any other group of females) bear the bulk of child care responsibilities”.

46. Two points emerge from these authorities:

- a. First, the fact that women bear the greater burden of childcare responsibilities than men and that this can limit their ability to work certain hours is a matter in respect of which judicial notice has been taken without further inquiry on several occasions. We refer to this fact as “the childcare disparity”;
- b. Whilst the childcare disparity is not a matter directed by statute to be taken into account, it is one that has been noticed by Courts at all levels for many years. As such, it falls into the category of matters that, according to Phipson, a tribunal must take into account if relevant.

47. That is not to say that the matter is set in stone: many societal norms and expectations change over time, and what may have been apt for judicial notice some years ago may not be so now. However, that does not apply to the childcare disparity. Whilst things might have progressed somewhat in that men do now bear a greater proportion of child caring responsibilities than they did decades ago, the position is still far from equal. The assumptions made and relied upon in the authorities above are still very much supported by the evidence presented to us of current disparities between men and women in relation to the burden of childcare.’ ... 51. We therefore reject Ms Darwin’s contention that taking judicial notice of the childcare disparity should invariably result in the group disadvantage being made out with the question for the Tribunal simply being one of justification. Such a blanket approach could give rise to unfairness and illogical outcomes. Where, for example, an arrangement is, on analysis, generally favourable to those with childcare responsibilities, it would be incongruous to treat that arrangement as nevertheless giving rise to group disadvantage falling to be justified. … 56. In summary, when considering whether there is group disadvantage in a claim of indirect discrimination, tribunals should bear in mind that particular disadvantage can be established in one of several ways, including the following:

- a. There may be statistical or other tangible evidence of disadvantage. However, the absence of such evidence should not usually result in the claim of indirect discrimination (and of group disadvantage in particular) being rejected in limine;
- b. Group disadvantage may be inferred from the fact that there is a particular disadvantage in the individual case. Whether or not that is so will depend on the facts, including the nature of the PCP and the disadvantage faced. Clearly, it may be more difficult to extrapolate from the particular to the general in this way when the disadvantage to the individual is because of a unique or highly unusual set of circumstances that may not be the same as those with whom the protected characteristic is shared;
- c. The disadvantage may be inherent in the PCP in question; and/or
- d. The disadvantage may be established having regard to matters, such as the childcare disparity, of which judicial notice should be taken. Once again, whether or not that is so will depend on the nature of the PCP and how it relates to the matter in respect of which judicial notice is to be taken.

In 2023 the case was reheard at ET. The judgement again went in favour of Cumbria Partnership Trust.

== See also ==
- UK labour law
