= Journal of Historical Review =

Pseudocademic journal advancing Holocaust denial

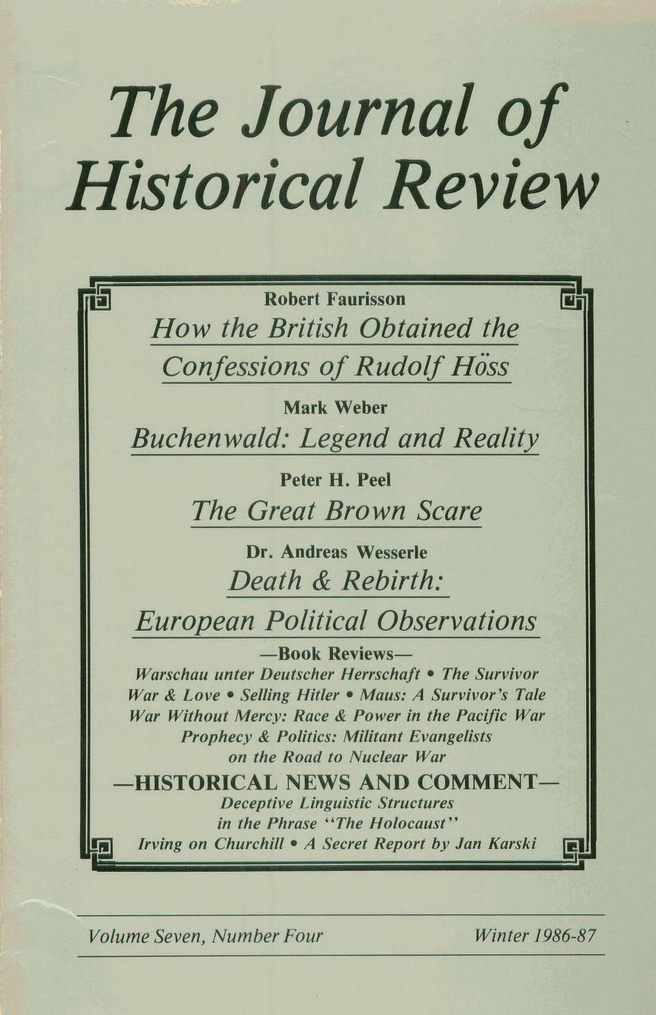
- Cover of vol. 7, no. 4, Winter 1986–1987
- Discipline: Pseudohistory
- Peer-reviewed: No
- Language: English

Publication details
- History: 1980–2002
- Publisher: Institute for Historical Review (United States)
- Frequency: Bimonthly

Standard abbreviations
- ISO 4: J. Hist. Rev.

Indexing
- ISSN: 0195-6752
- LCCN: 82644024
- OCLC no.: 5584935

Links
- Journal homepage

The Journal of Historical Review was a non-peer-reviewed, pseudoacademic periodical focused on promoting Holocaust denial. It was published by the Institute for Historical Review (IHR), based in Torrance, California. It ran quarterly from 1980 until 1992, and then bimonthly from 1993 until publication ceased due to financial issues in 2002.

== History ==
The journal was established in 1978 by the far-right political activist Willis Carto, derived from Carto's The American Mercury. Its first issue appeared in 1980.

Its first editor was David McCalden, who then left the periodical in 1981 after a dispute with Carto. He was replaced by Tom Marcellus, who was replaced in February 1983 with Keith Stimely, until Stimely quit the IHR in February 1985 after he got into a dispute with Carto. The impetus for this was his claim that Carto had, without consulting him, removed part of an article by Robert Faurisson that was critical of David Irving (both Holocaust deniers) from the Journal. Stimely was replaced as editor by Robert Berkel, but he also left in 1988 after getting into a dispute with Carto. In 1985, Mark Weber joined the institute's editorial advisory committee and was made editor of the journal in 1992. He was the editor from then until the journal's end.

Publication was suspended for a time due to the Mel Mermelstein case, which caused the IHR great financial difficulties. It was revived in 1988, with a magazine rather than academic style. This was accompanied by an aggressive marketing campaign, which increased the periodical's circulation to 7,000 from 4,500. Its circulation was at 6,000 in 1993, but this fell to 3,000 by the time of the periodical's end.

In the 1980s, the IHR's members (principally Marcellus and Weber), seeing the IHR as a serious group, became increasingly embarrassed by how outspoken Carto was in his antisemitism; they also came into conflict over Carto's usage of funds (alleging he had stole several million dollars from them). in 1993, they wrote a document, published in the Journal, rebuking him and calling him a liability that had contributed little to the IHR. They voted to oust him and filed a lawsuit against Carto. After Carto was ousted, he launched another Holocaust denial magazine in 1994, The Barnes Review, as a competitor to the JHR.

The journal commenced publication in the spring of 1980 as a quarterly periodical. No issues were published between April 1996 and May 1997. It continued until 2002, when it became defunct due to financial problems. After publication of the journal ceased, the IHR publishes its Bulletin only in an online format, although back issues are still made available on the Institute website.

== Contents ==
Its subject was primarily Holocaust denial, though other topics were discussed, if only at times to fill space. In terms of topics covered it was heavily European in orientation, though a majority of its contributors were Americans. The journal published original content but also sometimes reprinted articles from deceased authors to fill space. In an analysis of its contents, historian Stephen E. Atkins found that 34.4% of articles were on exclusively Holocaust denial articles, while "revisionist" history of all kinds (including on the Holocaust) was 41.5% of its coverage, and 13% was on topics unrelated to Holocaust denial. Its contents were initially academic in style, but following the 1988 revival were changed to a magazine format with photographs and colors.

Writer Spencer Sunshine described it as the "premier Holocaust denial publication in the United States". The journal became a platform for Holocaust deniers around the world, with the editorial board including, among others, Germans Udo Walendy, Wilhelm Stäglich, and Georg Franz-Willing; French Robert Faurisson and Henri Roques; Argentinian W. Beweraggi-Allende, Australian John Tuson Bennett; Spanish Enrique Aynat; Italian Carlo Mattogno; and American M. A. R. Barker.

== Editors ==
- David McCalden (1980–1981)
- Tom Marcellus (1981–1983)
- Keith Stimely (1983–1985)
- Robert Berkel (1985–1988)
- Mark Weber (1992–2002)

== Reception ==
The Journal's critics have included the Anti-Defamation League, the Danish Center for Holocaust and Genocide Studies, and scholars including Robert Hanyok, a National Security Agency historian, and many others who have described the journal as pseudo-scientific. Scholar of the radical right Jeffrey Kaplan called it a "serious-looking, pseudo-academic journal". Historian Stephen E. Atkins wrote that the contents of the journal were "cleverly intertwined between Holocaust denial and what might be considered as historical revisionism".

Jonathan Petropoulos wrote in The History Teacher that the "[journal] is shockingly racist and antisemitic: articles on 'America's Failed Racial Policy' and anti-Israel pieces accompany those about gas chambers... They clearly have no business claiming to be a continuation of the revisionist tradition, and should be referred to as 'Holocaust Deniers'."

Russian historians Igor Ryzhov and Maria Borodina commented that the fact that the Institute for Historical Review published its own historical journal "helped not only to unite the deniers into a single movement, but also to give their activities a form of pseudo-scientificness." The Organization of American Historians commissioned a study of the journal in which a panel had found that it was "nothing but a masquerade of scholarship".
