= Never Forget (film) =

- Genre: Drama; War
- Written by: Ronald Rubin
- Directed by: Joseph Sargent
- Starring: Leonard Nimoy; Blythe Danner; Dabney Coleman
- Theme music composer: Henry Mancini
- Country of origin: United States
- Original language: English

Production
- Producers: Robert B. Radnitz; Terence Nelson
- Cinematography: Kees Van Oostrum
- Editor: Michael Brown
- Running time: 94 minutes
- Production companies: Nimoy/Radnitz Productions; Turner Pictures

Original release
- Network: TNT
- Release: April 8, 1991

Never Forget is a 1991 American made-for-television drama film starring Leonard Nimoy and directed by Joseph Sargent. It originally aired April 8, 1991 on TNT.

== Plot ==
Mel Mermelstein and his wife Jane are a California couple thrown into the spotlight of judicial history in the 1980s. Mel is a Hungarian-born Jew, sole survivor of his family's extermination at Auschwitz, and Jane is a Southern Baptist from Tennessee. Their four children are good kids, typical Americans, with just enough orneriness to irritate each other, but enough love and class to pull together when it counts. When challenged by a hate group to prove that Jews were actually gassed at Auschwitz, Mel rises to the occasion with the support of his wife and children, in spite of the dangers to himself, his business, and his family. William John Cox, a Roman Catholic lawyer originally from Texas, provides pro bono legal help.

== Cast ==
- Leonard Nimoy as Mel Mermelstein
- Blythe Danner as Jane Mermelstein
- Dabney Coleman as William John Cox
- Paul Hampton as Richard Fusilier
- Jason Presson as Bernie Mermelstein
- Juliet Sorci as Edie Mermelstein
- Nicholas Fee as David Mermelstein
- Benji Gregory as Kenny Mermelstein
- David Margulies as Rabbi Hier
- Thomas Bellin as Rabbi Cooper

== Reception ==
Writing for The New York Times, John O'Connor found Never Forget was a "small, well-crafted movie". Slashfilm lists the film as Nimoy's best performance, outside the Star Trek universe.
