= Jürgen Graf =

Swiss Holocaust denier (1951–2025)

- Born: Jürgen Graf; 15 August 1951; Basel, Switzerland
- Died: 14 January 2025 (aged 73); Basel, Switzerland
- Occupations: Teacher, author, translator
- Known for: Holocaust denial
- Criminal charges: Holocaust denial

Jürgen Graf (15 August 1951 – 14 January 2025) was a Swiss author, teacher and Holocaust denier. From August 2000 he was living in exile, later in his life in Russia, working as a translator, with his wife.

== Background ==
Born in Basel, Graf studied philology at the University of Basel; English, Romance and Scandinavian studies, and in 1979 completed his licentiate. He spent several years working as a school teacher teaching languages and later taught German at a Taipei school in Taiwan. On his return to Basel, he worked as interrogator of asylum seekers at the receiving agency on the repurposed Rhine cruise ship Basilea. He described his experiences in his 1990 book The Ship of Fools (Das Narrenschiff), over which he was accused of xenophobia.

By the early 1990s, Graf was a convert to Holocaust denial, and was introduced to the field by his friend and retired school teacher Arthur Vogt through the works of Serge Thion, Arthur Butz and Wilhelm Stäglich. During the 1990s, he published several Holocaust denial works, his first titled The Holocaust on trial: Eyewitness accounts versus natural laws (Der Holocaust auf dem Prüfstand: Augenzeugenberichte versus Naturgesetze), several of his later books co-authored with the Italian Holocaust denier Carlo Mattogno. Graf distributed his book to journalists and parliamentarians, establishing a reputation as a Holocaust denier. As the result, he was dismissed from his teaching position; he was later employed in a private school in Basel, teaching German to foreign students.

Graf's publications eventually led Swiss authorities to persecute him for violating Swiss anti-racism laws. Graf and his then-publisher, Gerhard Förster, were tried by a Swiss court in July 1998; Graf was sentenced to a substantial fine and 15 months imprisonment. He fled the country while awaiting his appeal, travelling through Poland, Russia, Ukraine and Turkey, ending in Iran, where a group of Iranian Holocaust deniers sheltered him in Tehran. Graf subsequently relocated to Moscow, Russia, where he met and married a Belarusian woman in 2001. He lived and worked in Moscow as a translator until 2018.

Graf died on 14 January 2025, at the age of 73.
