= Carlo Mattogno =

Italian writer and Holocaust denier (born 1951)

- Born: 12 January 1951 (age 75); Orvieto, Italy
- Occupation: Writer
- Known for: Holocaust denial

Carlo Mattogno (born 1951) is an Italian writer, Holocaust denier, and neo-Nazi. He served on the Advisory Board of the Institute for Historical Review and as an editor of its publication Journal of Historical Review. As of 2016, Mattogno is an editorial advisor and columnist for a journal published by the Committee for Open Debate on the Holocaust, also a Holocaust denial organisation.

== Life ==
There is little information available about Mattogno aside from revisionist or right-wing websites. According to these sources, he was born in Orvieto, Italy and is now living with his family in a suburb of Rome. It is claimed that he has studied Latin, Greek, Philosophy, and has undertaken Oriental and religious studies. There is nonetheless no verifiable evidence concerning the date or length of his studies nor whether he has graduated.

Mattogno is among Holocaust deniers who design themselves as a "school" of historiography. He first came to attention with two pseudoscientific studies, Il rapporto Gerstein: anatomia di un falso (The Gerstein Report – Anatomy of a Fraud) and Il mito dello sterminio ebraico (The Myth of the Extermination of the Jews), which he published in the Italian neo-fascist publishing house Sentinella d'Italia in 1985. Further outlets for his works are the neofascist publisher Edizioni di Ar, noted holocaust denier Germar Rudolf's Vierteljahreshefte für freie Geschichtsforschung and Rudolf's Castle Hill Publishers in Uckfield, UK, the revisionist L'Association des Anciens Amateurs de Récits de Guerres et d'Holocaustes, and Ahmed Rami's extreme right-wing-islamistic website "Radio Islam".

Together with his brother, the Traditionalist Catholic Gian Pio Mattogno, he regularly publishes in the extreme right-wing magazine Orion. Carlo Mattogno collaborated with Holocaust denier Jürgen Graf. He served on the Advisory Board of the "revisionist" Institute for Historical Review and as an editor of its publication Journal of Historical Review.

He is an editorial advisor and columnist for the journal published by the Committee for Open Debate on the Holocaust (CODOH). The group is also a promoter of Holocaust denial.
