= David Blatner =

American author specializing in desktop publishing (born 1966)

- Born: February 13, 1966 (age 60); Palo Alto, California, U.S.
- Education: Pomona College
- Occupations: Author, speaker, publisher

David Blatner (born February 13, 1966) is an American author and speaker who writes about desktop publishing software, including Adobe InDesign, Adobe Photoshop, and QuarkXPress. He has also written general-interest non-fiction on subjects such as the number pi, aviation, and the scale of the universe. He is the co-founder of the InDesignSecrets website and InDesign Magazine and the president of CreativePro Network, which produces the annual CreativePro Week conference.

== Early life ==
Blatner was born in Palo Alto, California, and attended Palo Alto High School. His father is the psychiatrist Adam Blatner and his step-father is the computer scientist Richard Fikes. In the late 1980s he performed with the Palo Alto improvisational theatre troupe Creative Mayhem. He graduated from Pomona College.

== Career ==
=== Desktop publishing books ===
Blatner's first widely noted book was The QuarkXPress Book, co-written with Keith Stimely and published by Peachpit Press in 1990. It appeared on Publishers Weekly's list of computer bestsellers in March 1991. The book won a 1991 Benjamin Franklin Award for technical writing; later editions were retitled Real World QuarkXPress.

Through the 1990s and 2000s Blatner co-wrote a series of books for Peachpit Press focused on desktop publishing, production, and color management. Several of these were co-written with color and imaging specialist Bruce Fraser, including multiple editions of Real World Photoshop. As Adobe InDesign supplanted QuarkXPress in professional publishing, Blatner shifted his focus to InDesign, co-writing Real World Adobe InDesign with Olav Martin Kvern (and, in later editions, with Bob Bringhurst) and Adobe InDesign CS/CS2 Breakthroughs with Anne-Marie Concepción.

=== InDesignSecrets, CreativePro, and conferences ===
In 2005 Blatner and Anne-Marie Concepción launched InDesignSecrets, a blog and podcast for InDesign users. In 2013 their company acquired InDesign Magazine, The InDesign Conference, and the long-running design portal CreativePro.com (founded 1999), consolidating them as the CreativePro Network, of which Blatner serves as president. The company launched PePcon, a print and e-publishing conference, in 2010, and in 2017 began CreativePro Week, an annual multi-track event for creative professionals. Blatner has also produced InDesign and Photoshop video courses for Lynda.com/LinkedIn Learning.

=== General-interest books ===
Blatner has written popular non-fiction as well. The Joy of Pi (1997), a mixed-format treatment of the history and culture of pi, was reviewed by the Mathematical Association of America and led to Blatner being cited as an authority on the number in general-interest coverage. His later book Spectrums: Our Mind-Boggling Universe from Infinitesimal to Infinity (2012) was reviewed by Kirkus Reviews. He is also the author of The Flying Book (2003), Silicon Mirage: The Art and Science of Virtual Reality (with Steve Aukstakalnis, 1992), and Judaism for Dummies (with Ted Falcon, 2001).

== Personal life ==
Blatner lives near Seattle, Washington.

== Bibliography ==
- Aukstakalnis, Steve; Blatner, David (1992). Silicon Mirage: The Art and Science of Virtual Reality. Berkeley, California: Peachpit Press. ISBN 0-938151-82-7.
- Blatner, David; Stimely, Keith (1991). The QuarkXPress Book (2nd ed.). Berkeley, California: Peachpit Press. ISBN 0-938151-86-X.
- Blatner, David; Fraser, Bruce. Real World Adobe Photoshop. Berkeley, California: Peachpit Press.
- Blatner, David (1997). The Joy of Pi. New York: Walker & Company. ISBN 978-0-8027-1332-2.
- Blatner, David; Falcon, Ted (2001). Judaism for Dummies. New York: Hungry Minds. ISBN 978-0-7645-5299-1.
- Blatner, David (2003). The Flying Book: Everything You've Ever Wondered About Flying on Airplanes. New York: Walker & Company. ISBN 978-0-8027-1378-0.
- Kvern, Olav Martin; Blatner, David; Bringhurst, Bob. Real World Adobe InDesign. Berkeley, California: Peachpit Press.
- Blatner, David (2012). Spectrums: Our Mind-Boggling Universe from Infinitesimal to Infinity. New York: Walker & Company. ISBN 978-0-8027-1770-2.
