= Georg Franz-Willing =

German historian (1915–2008)

Georg Franz-Willing (11 March 1915 – September 2008) was a German revisionist historian. He was a speaker at the Holocaust denying Institute for Historical Review (IHR), where he was also one of the editors of their newsletter and published it.

He also was a referent in the right wing of the Society for Free Journalism and mostly published in a publishing company in Germany, such as Druffel Verlag, Grabert Verlag, Schütz-Verlag and Nation Europa Verlag or Hohenrain-Verlag.

His early works on the history of the NSDAP were occasionally used from historians with "seriously deficient" studies and research as a source of material, a takeover of his ratings however, is because of his "closeness to radical light" or "an apologetic tendency" were avoided.

He believed that the Diary of Anne Frank was a forgery, but that "the Jewish declaration of war on Germany" was real.
