= Austin App =

Professor of literature and Holocaust denier (1902–1984)

Austin Joseph App
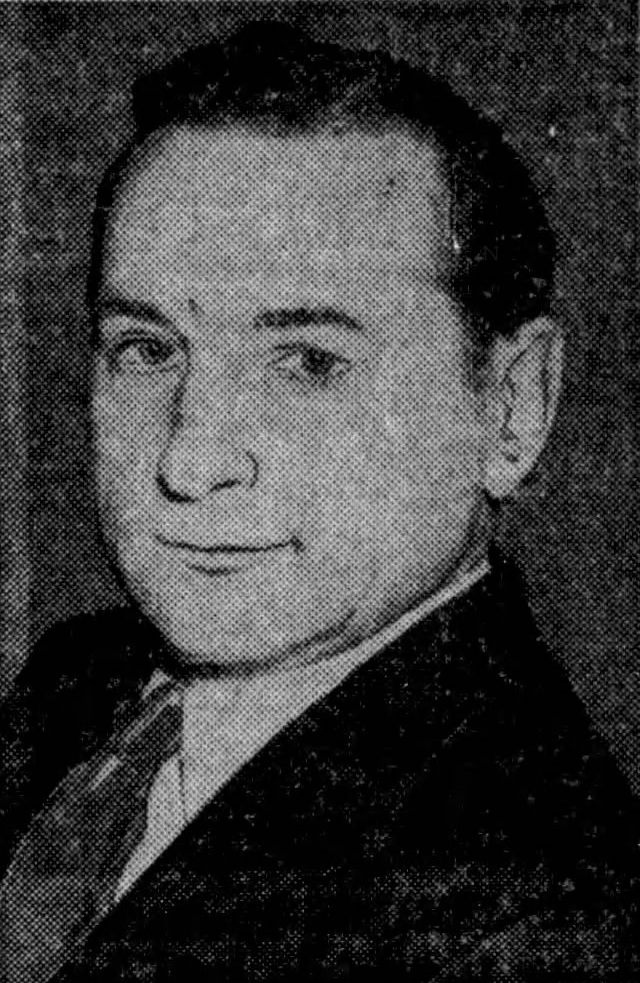
- App, pictured 1944
- Born: Austin Joseph App; May 24, 1902; Milwaukee, Wisconsin, U.S.
- Died: May 4, 1984 (aged 81)
- Occupation: Literature professor

Austin Joseph App (May 24, 1902 – May 3, 1984) was an American professor of medieval English literature who taught at the University of Scranton and La Salle University. App defended Nazi Germany during World War II. He is known for his work denying the Holocaust, and he has been called the first major American Holocaust denier.

== Early life and education ==
App was born in Milwaukee, on May 24, 1902, to German immigrant parents who were farmers, he attended St. Francis Seminary near Milwaukee and graduated in 1923. He studied English Literature at the Catholic University of America in Washington, D.C., where he received a Ph.D. in 1929.

== Career ==
App served as an instructor of English at Catholic University of America from 1929 to 1935. From 1935 to 1942 he served as the head of the English Department at the University of Scranton, publishing widely in scholarly and popular journals. He wrote for The Catholic Home Journal, Magnificat, Queen's Work, and The Victorian. By his own account, he was particularly devoted to the cultural value of good manners, well-developed public speaking, and chivalry.

App never married. He was a frequent public speaker. He wrote many letters to the editors of magazines and newspapers. He complained about the American declaration of war on Germany, and argued that without American intervention the Axis powers would have won World War II. He blamed Jews and communists for Germany's postwar problems. Few of his letters were published.

In a manner of criticism typical for his generation, App often examined literary aesthetics according to categories of virtue and truth. In a collection of essays printed in 1948, he argued for a Christian interpretation of literature in chapters titled “Presenting Sin and Temptation in Literature” and “How to Judge a Novel Ethically.”

He became president of the Federation of American Citizens of German Descent in 1945, serving in this position for several years. In the 1950s, App often wrote articles for Conde McGinley's antisemitic newspaper Common Sense. He later founded The Boniface Press and served as an editor there. It was named after Saint Boniface, the Anglo-Saxon missionary who brought the faith to Germanic Europe. He served on the editorial advisory committee of the revisionist Journal of Historical Review from 1980 until his death.

=== Holocaust denial ===
App laid out eight axioms, or what he described as "incontrovertible assertions", about the Holocaust in his 1973 pamphlet The Six Million Swindle: Blackmailing the German People for Hard Marks With Fabricated Corpses, which denied the existence of gas chambers and tried to show it was impossible for six million Jews to have been killed.

In February 1976, App published an article "The Sudeten-German Tragedy" in Reason magazine, criticizing the post-World War II expulsion of the Sudeten Germans as "one of the worst mass atrocities in history." The article was later printed as a pamphlet.

App also published A Straight Look at the Third Reich, a defense of Nazi Germany, and The Curse of Anti-Anti-Semitism, arguing that the entire Jewish community is responsible for the death of Christ. App's work inspired the Institute for Historical Review, a Holocaust denial center in California, founded in 1978.

== Selected works ==
- Lancelot in English Literature: His Role and Character, doctoral dissertation, Catholic University of America, 1929
- Edwin Arlington Robinson’s Arthurian Poems, in: Thought 10.3 (1935), p. 468-479
- History's Most Terrifying Peace. 1947
- Ravishing the Women of Conquered Europe. Pamphlet, 1948
- The Way to Creative Writing. Milwaukee: Bruce Publishers, 1954
- Making the Later Years Count. For a healthy, well-provided, blessed Old Age. Milwaukee: Bruce Publishers, 1960
- The Rooseveltian concentration camps for Japanese-Americans, 1942-46. Philadelphia: Boniface Press, 1967
- A straight look at the Third Reich: Hitler and National Socialism, how right? how wrong? Takoma Park, Maryland: Boniface Press, 1974
- The Six Million Swindle: Blackmailing the German People for Hard Marks with Fabricated Corpses. Takoma Park, Maryland: Boniface Press, 1973. Second edition printed in 1976.
- The Curse of Anti-Anti-Semitism. 1976
- German-American Voice for Truth and Justice: Autobiography. Takoma Park, Maryland: Boniface Press, 1977
- The Sudeten-German Tragedy. Takoma Park, Maryland: Boniface Press, 1979- (several volumes)
