= Willis Carto =

American political activist (1926–2015)

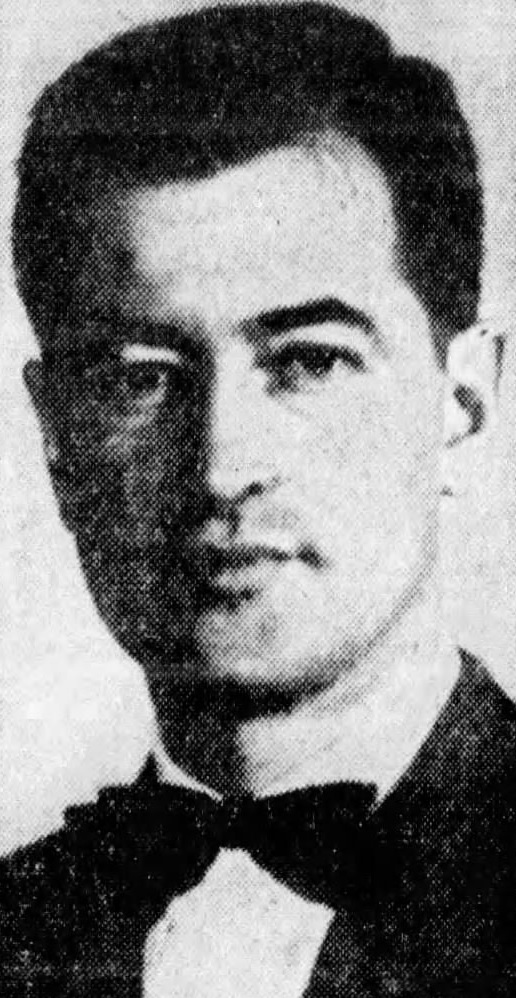
- Carto in 1958
- Born: Willis Allison Carto; July 17, 1926; Fort Wayne, Indiana, U.S.
- Died: October 26, 2015 (aged 89); Virginia, U.S.
- Other name: E. L. Anderson
- Organization(s): Liberty Lobby, Institute for Historical Review
- Political party: Populist
- Spouse: Elisabeth Oldemeier (m. 1958)

Willis Allison Carto (July 17, 1926 – October 26, 2015) was an American far-right political activist and publisher. He described himself as a Jeffersonian and a populist, but was primarily known for his promotion of antisemitic conspiracy theories and Holocaust denial. Throughout his life, Carto established and controlled a variety of right-wing periodicals and organizations, most significantly the Liberty Lobby.

Carto ran a group supporting segregationist George Wallace's 1968 presidential campaign and reorganized the group into the National Youth Alliance, later taken over by Carto's associate William Luther Pierce and turned into the National Alliance. Carto founded the Holocaust denial organization the Institute for Historical Review, though later lost control of the organization in a dispute. Carto helped found the Populist Party, which served as an electoral vehicle for white supremacists. He also ran a number of far-right periodicals throughout his career, including Right, Liberty Letter, The American Mercury, The Spotlight, and the American Free Press, among others.

An intensely private person despite his influence, Carto remains little known and had a reputation as a "shadowy" figure even among other far-right activists. He was also known for his frequent, bitter disputes with other right-wing figures and former associates. Extremism scholar George Michael, the author of a biography of Carto, argued that despite his public obscurity, Carto was "undoubtedly the central figure in the post-World War II American far right".

== Early life ==
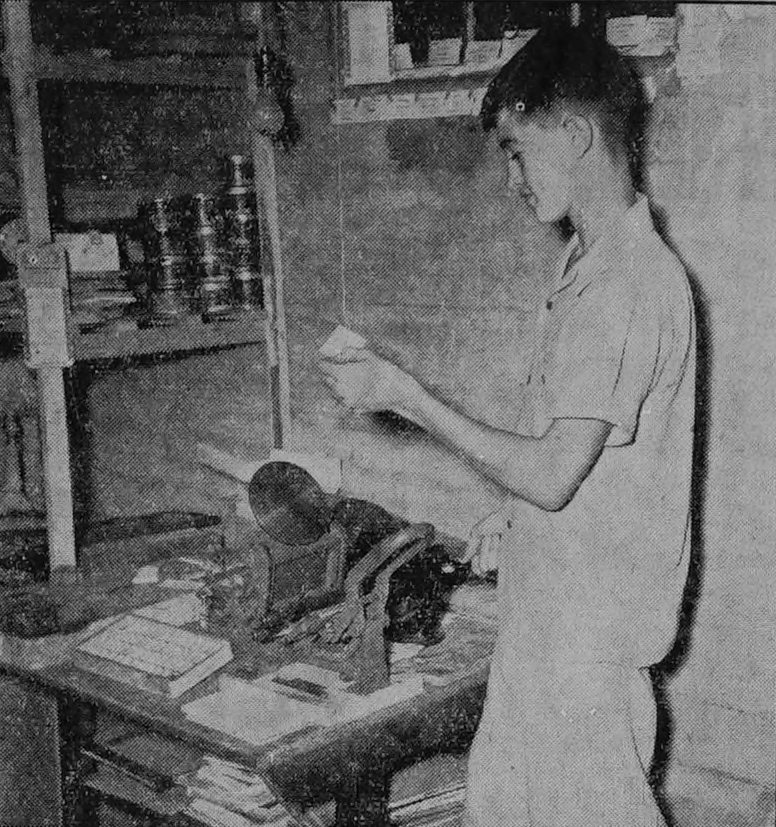
Carto at his printing press in 1941, aged 15

Willis Allison Carto was born in Fort Wayne, Indiana on July 17, 1926, to Willis Frank Carto, a paper salesman, and Dorothy Louise Carto (née Allison). He was of French and German descent through his father, descended from Huguenot settlers; his family originally spelled their surname Carteaux, which was anglicized to Carto by his grandfather. Carto had one brother, David, four years his junior. The family was Methodist and attended the Wayne Street Methodist Church. As a child, Carto served as the church's head usher.

In his youth, Carto and his family listened to the broadcasts of antisemitic preacher Charles Coughlin. His family varied politically and often had heated political debates; his father was a Republican, but was not politically active, which Carto later derided him for. He attended Harrison Hill Grade School, before attending South Side High School. Fort Wayne was highly segregated while he was growing up, though Carto had a childhood friend who was black. As an adolescent, Carto was generally not exposed to racial tensions and did not think much about race.

He had an early interest in newspapers and other printing, describing his childhood hero as Robert R. McCormick of the Chicago Tribune. He worked a variety of odd jobs, and eventually at a print shop and was a door-to-door magazine salesman. His father bought him a printing press and Carto learned to manually set type. As a teenager he published his own free paper targeted at a young audience, the Canteen Chronicle. Carto graduated from high school in June 1944.

== Military service ==
With World War II ongoing, Carto attempted to join the United States Navy but was rejected due to having an illness. After the illness was cured, the United States Army drafted him. He attended basic training at Camp Fannin in Texas, and was thereafter sent to Fort Ord in California. He went on to serve in the Philippines with the Americal Division.

While serving in the Philippines, one of his closest friends was killed in combat, which affected Carto. Additionally, Carto was shot in the arm by a Japanese sniper; this earned him the Purple Heart, and he was also awarded the Combat Infantry Badge for his service. He would ultimately rise to the rank of corporal. Following the United States's victory over Japan, Carto was transferred there and served as part of the occupying force in Sendai. He was transferred back to the United States in 1946 and stationed at Illinois's Fort Sheridan. He received an honorable discharge that year.

== Political career ==
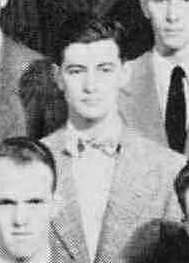
Carto in 1947 at Denison University

After leaving the military, Carto lived with his parents in Mansfield, Ohio. At the behest of his parents, he studied law for two years at Denison University, but did not graduate, instead moving onto University of Cincinnati Law School where he studied for a semester before dropping out in 1949. His grades were apparently average; Carto attributed his decision to drop out to wanderlust.

He came to work as a distributor for Procter & Gamble. This job allowed Carto to travel frequently distributing the company's products. These travels exposed Carto to racial and other political issues in a way that he had not been previously, such as Southern black slums. Initially, he was relatively sympathetic to the plight of poor black Americans, but soon came to view them as fundamentally inferior to white Americans, "content to live in slums". He was promoted to crew manager with the company, at the same time becoming politically discontent with the establishment as out of touch. With the outbreak of the Korean War, his department was terminated by the company and Carto was out of a job.

=== Liberty Lobby, Yockey, and publications (1950s–1960s) ===
In the early 1950s, Carto moved west to San Francisco, California where he worked for the Household Finance Company, a loan company. While at this job he began working as a political organizer, first entering the right-wing political scene in 1952. Carto met Willis Stone, a right-wing activist and the founder of the Liberty Amendment Group. Stone introduced Carto to Aldrich Blake, the founder of Liberty and Property, a right-wing political organization; shortly after, Blake had Carto work on a publication against racial integration, The Job Can Be Done!, and followed it with similar publications.

Throughout the mid to late 1950s, Carto worked selling coffee and printing machines. In 1955, Blake, being substantially older than Carto, decided to give over control of Liberty and Property to him. Carto proceeded to incorporate the organization. The same year, Carto launched the magazine Right. It focused on far-right politics and ceased in 1960. One writer for Right was George Lincoln Rockwell, another far-right activist and a close friend of Carto's; he later became far more notorious as the founder of the American Nazi Party. After his shift to open Nazism, Rockwell ceased writing for the periodical, but continued to work with Carto and maintain their friendship many years afterwards; Carto wrote positively about Rockwell and his American Nazi Party.

Seeing Liberty and Property as unsuccessful, Carto shuttered the organization. It was eventually replaced by the Liberty Lobby, though it is unclear when, exactly, this occurred. The organization was formally incorporated in Washington, D.C. on February 1, 1962, though its own materials variously claim June 5, 1955 or July 17, 1957 as its founding date. The first public declaration of an intent to create the Liberty Lobby came in an August 1957 article in Right magazine. In the 1960s, the Liberty Lobby launched several periodicals, the most important of which was the Liberty Letter. In 1966, Carto acquired control of the preexisting magazine The American Mercury.

Carto met Elisabeth Waltraud Oldemeier at a National Review gathering in the 1950s. Oldemeier was 11 years Carto's junior and had been born in Germany. They married on November 15, 1958. They remained married until Carto's death; the couple never had any children. She was deeply loyal to Carto and his politics and frequently collaborated with him on his political efforts.

In the 1950s, Carto acquired a copy of the book Imperium, authored by fascist activist Francis Parker Yockey; then rare, obscure, and out of print, it had been published in the late 1940s to little fanfare. After reading the book, Carto became a devotee of Yockey and the ideology he espoused in Imperium. In 1960, Carto obtained a 15-minute interview with Yockey on June 10, 1960, while the latter was held in jail for passport fraud. Yockey committed suicide in jail six days later on June 16. Carto was the last person to see Yockey alive (excepting Yockey's attorney). Following his death, Carto became the lead promoter of Yockey's writings and republished it with his Noontide Press, bringing the book to a much wider audience. For some decades after the suicide there was a persistent, but likely false, rumor among far-righters that Carto had assisted in Yockey's suicide. Noontide also published books on Holocaust denial, including David L. Hoggan's The Myth of the Six Million, one of the first books to deny the Holocaust. Rockwell and Carto's friendship ceased in 1964 when they had a split after Rockwell accused Yockey of being a Soviet agent.

Carto ran a group called "Youth for George Wallace" to aid the third party presidential campaign of George Wallace in 1968. When the campaign failed, he converted what remained of the Youth for George Wallace organization into the National Youth Alliance. As National Chairman for the group, Carto recruited William Luther Pierce. Carto eventually lost control of the National Youth Alliance and its magazine Attack! to Pierce who transformed it into the National Alliance, a white nationalist and white separatist political organization.

=== Historical revisionism, Holocaust denial, and the Populist Party (1970s–1980s) ===
Like Yockey at their meeting, Carto is a shadow—a furtive man of middle height and middle build who shuns reporters, hates to have his picture taken, prefers to control his empire from behind the scenes while others front for him. His friendships are few and brief, degenerating usually into acrimony. He favors 75-cent haircuts and $40 suits, and once raged at an employee for buying a gross of paperclips. He delights in secrecy, conspiracy, and power. He is every bit as "strange and lonely" a man as his hero.

— C. H. Simonds, National Review

On September 10, 1971, the conservative magazine National Review published an expose on Carto's activities up to that point as a cover story. It was titled "The Strange Story of Willis Carto" and authored by C. H. Simonds; it was highly critical of him and his organization, portraying Carto's ideology as inherently at odds with American conservatism and tradition. The cover showed Carto as a shadowy figure hiding behind the mask of Uncle Sam.

With the Liberty Lobby Carto launched a radio program, This Is Liberty Lobby; the Anti-Defamation League launched a campaign to get the show off the air, which succeeded, much to Carto's chagrin. After the Liberty Letter ceased in 1975, the Liberty Lobby replaced it with a new publication, The Spotlight, a newspaper which was published between then and 2001.

Carto founded the Institute for Historical Review in 1979. The IHR and Carto were sued in 1981 by public interest attorney William John Cox on behalf of Auschwitz survivor Mel Mermelstein. In that case, which was to eventually last eleven years, the court took "judicial notice of the fact that Jews were gassed to death at Auschwitz concentration camp in Poland during the summer of 1944." The court went on to state that the Holocaust was "not reasonably subject to dispute". During the case Carto claimed that the Jewish Defense League had tried to firebomb his home.

The law firm of Robert Von Esch Jr., representing the defendants, settled with the plaintiff to remove themselves from the case by agreeing to pay $100,000 and an explicit apology for having filed an August 1986 libel suit by the IHR against Mermelstein. The Von Esches also formally acknowledged that Jews had been gassed at Auschwitz and that millions of Jews had perished in German wartime camps. On September 19, 1991, the plaintiffs withdrew complaints of libel, conspiracy to inflict emotional distress and intentional infliction of emotional distress, following Los Angeles Superior Court Judge Stephen M. Lachs' dismissal of the malicious prosecution portion of the case.

In 1984, Carto was involved in starting a new political party called the Populist Party, combining various far right groups. Carto was the chairman of the party's Program Committee and avoided the public spotlight in this venture and was never formally the leader of the party. Several white supremacists were involved in the party, with its first chairman, Robert Weems, being a leading member of the Ku Klux Klan, though many in the white supremacist movement refused to be involved. The party ran a presidential ticket with Bob Richards that same year. A schism emerged, with Carto's schism eventually outlasting the other faction and coming to reinstate the original platform. The party ran several white supremacist candidates, including, in 1988, David Duke, who Carto admired. In 1989, the party schismed again, and in the early 1990s Carto ceased involvement with any form of the Populist Party.

=== Later career (1990s–2000s) ===
Carto also formed the Foundation to Defend the First Amendment, one of several nonprofits Carto used to spread money to political causes. After losing control of Noontide Press and the IHR in a hostile takeover by former associates, Carto started another publication in 1994, The Barnes Review, with the focus also on Holocaust denial as a competitor to the IHR's Journal of Historical Review.

In 1998, following owner George Burdi's arrest, Carto bought the white power music label Resistance Records and their magazine Resistance; Carto's involvement was kept private and it was legally owned by a shell corporation owned by right-wing activist and former Reagan administration staffer Todd Blodgett. The company was moved to San Diego County. Under Carto's ownership, Resistance magazine was not restarted and no issues were printed; as compensation, Resistance subscribers were sent six months of Carto's The Spotlight. The Spotlight was very different in tone and content than Resistance. According to Leonard Zeskind, this may have been because Carto did not want competition with his own periodical, and instead wanted Resistance Records to increase subscriptions for The Spotlight.

Less than six months after acquiring Resistance Records, due to a lawsuit brought by Carto's former colleagues at the Holocaust denial organization the Institute for Historical Review, Carto was forced to declare bankruptcy and could no longer support Resistance Records. Blodgett sold it to William Luther Pierce (who Carto despised). In 2001, Liberty Lobby became defunct following the lawsuit.

After The Spotlight became defunct in 2001, Carto and several Spotlight staff members and writers subsequently founded a new newspaper called American Free Press. Outside of the name change, that paper is otherwise basically identical to The Spotlight.

In 2004, Carto joined in signing David Duke's New Orleans Protocol on behalf of American Free Press. The New Orleans Protocol sought to "mainstream our cause" by reducing internecine warfare. Carto let himself be extensively interviewed for extremism scholar George Michael's 2008 book Willis Carto and the American Far Right, which was the first substantial biography of Carto.

== Death ==
Carto died on October 26, 2015, at the age of 89, reportedly from cardiac arrest. In February 2016, he was buried at Arlington National Cemetery (which the family had the right to request because he had earned a Purple Heart). Far-right and white nationalist Pastor Thomas A. Robb presided at the funeral.

== Views and influence ==
Later, Carto would define his ideology as Jeffersonian and populist rather than National Socialist, particularly in Carto's 1982 book, Profiles in Populism. That book presented sympathetic profiles of several United States political figures including Thomas Jefferson, Huey Long, Robert M. La Follette, Andrew Jackson, and Henry Ford, as well as antisemitic Catholic priest Father Charles Coughlin. He was primarily known for his promotion of antisemitic conspiracy theories and Holocaust denial. Leonard Zeskind said of Carto's beliefs that he "marketed racism and anti-Semitism as if they were the solution to all the world’s ills." On religion, Carto said he was a "cultural Christian", but did not actually attend Church.

Willis Carto was a devotee of the writings of Francis Parker Yockey, a far-rightist who heralded Adolf Hitler's Third Reich as the "European Imperium" against both Bolshevism and the United States, which he considered Jewish-controlled. Scholars have asserted that Yockey would have probably been forgotten without Carto's marketing of Imperium to the American audience. While he did not regret serving in the military, Carto later advocated for noninterventionism (with the exception of the Vietnam War, which he favored) and was, according to scholar George Michael, "generally very critical of war".

Carto was an intensely private man, with little known about him publicly for many decades. Upon his death in 2015, The New York Times described him as the "reclusive behind-the-scenes wizard of the far-right". He had a reputation even among other right wing activists as a "shadowy figure", and despite his immense influence on the far right, remains little known to those who study American political developments. George Michael noted that "over the past several decades, he has raised millions of dollars for his causes, yet he has received very little national publicity and has been virtually ignored by the mainstream press. Despite this obscurity, Carto is undoubtedly the central figure in the post-World War II American far right. More than any other person, he has fostered continuity within this movement and has been involved in virtually all of its major projects." Leonard Zeskind argued that "when a resurgence of white supremacist activity began in the mid-1970s, the footprints of [...] Carto were found at almost every point."

Carto was also known for his frequent, acrimonious disputes with former friends and other far-right activists. George Michael noted him as falling out with numerous other far-right activists who he had previously had working relationships with. Jeffrey Kaplan noted Carto's career in racism as "remarkable" and "remarkably consistent. None of his innumerable associations over the years has ended amicably. Rather, bitter splits and even more bitterly contested lawsuits have long been the lot of the irascible Carto." He wrote of Carto's ouster from the IHR that this "nasty public divorce is simply par for the course for most of Willis Carto’s associations." John George and Laird Wilcox noted the existence of an article in the publication Populist Observer from another far-right activist, Don Wassall, titled simply "Carto's Endless Feuds", dedicated to criticizing Carto. In part, this article listed those who Carto had feuded with, described by Kaplan as "a virtual Who’s Who of the American right":

Although probably not more than one in a hundred Spotlight readers is even aware of who he is, the shadowy Carto has clashed with an impressive list of conservatives, nationalists, populists, racialists, and religious conservatives. Although the following list is not complete, it gives a good idea of some of the individuals and organizations Carto has clashed with or attacked over the years:

Eustace Mullins, Harold Covington, Tom Metzger, George Dietz, Dr. Revilo Oliver, Dr. Edward Fields, Ben Klassen, David McCalden, Michael Hoffman, Robert DePugh, Dr. William Pierce, the John Birch Society, John Rees, William F. Buckley, Robert Bork, Reed Irvine, Human Events, Richard Vigurie, Rep. Vin Weber, Rep. Robert K. Dornan, Rep. Newt Gingrich, Jerry Falwell, Moral Majority, Pat Robertson, Jim Yarborough, Bob Richards, Don Kimball, Don Wassall, Pat Buchanan, and David Duke.

Kaplan further noted that "the erstwhile authors of this impressive but far from complete name check of Willis Carto’s legion of enemies may have run out of energy long before they ran out of names."

== Publications ==
- Introduction to Imperium (1963)
- Introduction to The Myth of the Six Million (1969), as E. L. Anderson
- Profiles in Populism (as editor). Old Greenwich, CT: Flag Press (1982), ISBN 978-0815965183.
- Afterword to Best Witness: The Mermelstein Affair, by Michael C. Piper. America First Books. Washington: Center for Historical Review (1994)
- Populism vs. Plutocracy: The Universal Struggle (as editor). Liberty Lobby.
