= Grabert Verlag =

German publishing house

Grabert-Verlag together with its subsidiary Hohenrain-Verlag is one of the largest and best-known extreme-right publishing houses in the Federal Republic of Germany. It is notorious for publishing antisemitic works, for example those of Wilhelm Stäglich. It also published works of historical revisionism, such as David Hoggan's Der erzwungene Krieg and books authored by Holocaust deniers such as Georg Franz-Willing.

Herbert Grabert (1901–1978), a former senior civil servant and lecturer in Alfred Rosenberg's Reich Ministry for the Occupied Eastern Territories, founded a publishing house named Verlag der Deutschen Hochschullehrer-Zeitung (engl. "Publisher of the German University Teacher-Newspaper") in 1953. In 1961, Grabert published the book Der erzwungene Krieg (The Forced War) by David L. Hoggan, which blamed the outbreak of World War II on an alleged Anglo-Polish conspiracy to wage aggression against Germany. Hoggan's book became one of the many extreme-right wing, revisionist publications that followed. The book was a best seller significantly contributing to the commercial success of the publishing house. In 1974 Grabert named his publishing house after himself. His son Wigbert (born 1941) took over the management. He received a DM 30,000 fine after he had published a book by Germar Rudolf denying the Holocaust in 1994.
