= Wilhelm Stäglich =

German Holocaust denier (1916–2006)

- Born: 11 November 1916; Berlin, Germany
- Died: 5 April 2006 (aged 89)
- Occupations: Army officer, judge, author, historian, Holocaust denier

Wilhelm Stäglich (11 November 1916 – 5 April 2006) was a World War II army officer, later a financial judge in Hamburg, and a prominent Holocaust denier.

== Background ==
Born on 11 November 1916, he studied law and political science at the University of Rostock and the University of Göttingen, from where he received a doctorate in law (Dr. jur.) in 1951. For years he served as a Fiscal Court judge in Hamburg. He was the author of numerous articles on legal and historical subjects. During the Second World War he served from mid-July to mid-September 1944 as an Ordonnanzoffizier (orderly officer) on the staff of an anti-aircraft detachment stationed near the Auschwitz camp.

== Holocaust denial charges ==
In 1974 a disciplinary hearing was conducted against Stäglich, then a financial judge, owing to his membership in the far-right NPD party and his incessant publications in far-right magazines; the result was a forced early retirement with a reduced pension for five years.

In 1979 the Tübingen-based Grabert Verlag published Stäglich's book Der Auschwitz-Mythos - Legende oder Wirklichkeit (The Auschwitz Myth – Legend or Reality), in which he denied the existence of gas chambers in the Nazi concentration camps and death camps, based on his personal observations during the war, and claimed that all documents relating to the Holocaust were forgeries. As early as 1980 this book was seized nationwide on the order of the state court of Stuttgart, and in 1982 it was placed on a list of materials that may not be distributed to young readers, following a decision by Germany's Federal Department for Media Harmful to Young Persons. The decision to confiscate the book was upheld by the Federal Court of Justice in 1983. Following this, the University of Göttingen instituted proceedings against Stäglich to formally discredit the doctoral degree he had received there in 1951,

Eckhard Jesse, a German political scientist and authority on radical politics, has defended the publication of the book The Auschwitz Myth. Stäglich, he says, was stripped of his doctoral title because it was deemed to be undeserved, under a law dating from 1939. Jesse wrote: "Even those who see his work as anti-Semitic – and here comes the warning – must question these decisions for two reasons. Firstly it is patronising to the public, who are assumed to lack judgment, hardly evidence of liberality; second, the far-right sees the decision as an affirmation, and outsiders might also believe, that there 'must be something' to Stäglich's arguments. You get the impression an example is being made [of Stäglich]."

For years Stäglich was a member of the Editorial Advisory Committee of the Institute for Historical Review's Journal of Historical Review. His address in 1983 at the Fifth Conference of the Institute for Historical Review was published in the Spring 1984 issue of the IHR's journal. In 1986 an English-language edition of his book was published by the IHR under the title Auschwitz: A Judge Looks at the Evidence.

Stäglich appeared together with Jürgen Rieger as a speaker at a far-right event commemorating the Holocaust denier Thies Christophersen, who died in 1997.

In February 2015, Germar Rudolf's Castle Hill Publishers reissued Stäglich's book Auschwitz: A Judge Looks at the Evidence, and it is a "corrected and slightly revised" edition.

== Notes ==
- Much of this article is translated from the German Wikipedia article of 2 March 2007
