= Noontide Press =

American antisemitic publisher

- Parent company: Institute for Historical Review
- Founded: 1960s
- Founder: Willis Carto
- Country of origin: United States
- Official website: noontidepress.com

Noontide Press is an American publisher founded by far-right activist Willis Carto and his wife Elisabeth Carto in the 1960s. It was founded as the publishing arm of the Liberty Lobby, before becoming one for the Institute for Historical Review. Many of its books deny the Holocaust; it describes itself as a publisher of "hard-to-find books and recordings from a dissident, 'politically incorrect' perspective." The company has been listed as a hate group by the Southern Poverty Law Center due to its Holocaust denial and white-separatist activities.

== History ==
Noontide Press was founded by far-right activist Willis Carto and his wife Elisabeth Carto in the early 1960s. It was initially founded as a subsidiary of the Liberty Lobby, an organization operated by Carto, then the largest antisemitic group in North America.

Originally, most of its books were generally racist and it did not specifically focus on Holocaust denial; their earliest, and initially only, offering focusing on that was The Myth of the Six Million by David L. Hoggan. In 1978, the British white supremacist David McCalden met Carto and joined him in working for Noontide. McCalden attempted to adapt the tactics of Noontide to make them more popular on the radical right, by encouraging Carto to de-emphasize the more straightforwardly racist books they published, to instead focus more totally on Holocaust denial books; McCalden despised Hoggan's book and said that it was "so full of mistakes it was a perpetual embarrassment" to Noontide. Carto refused to stop publishing the more generally racist books, but agreed to increase the focus on Holocaust denial.

Together McCalden and Carto founded the Institute for Historical Review (IHR), a Holocaust denial organization; Noontide later became the publishing arm of the IHR. McCalden stopped working with Carto in the IHR in 1981 after a personal dispute and ideological differences. In the 1990s, the IHR also cut ties with Carto due to financial allegations and a difference in ideology.

The company has been listed as a hate group by the Southern Poverty Law Center due to its Holocaust denial and white-separatist activities. The perpetrator of the 2009 United States Holocaust Memorial Museum shooting James von Brunn was a former employee of the organization.

== Works published ==
It describes itself as a publisher of "hard-to-find books and recordings from a dissident, 'politically incorrect' perspective." The publisher offered a means for holocaust deniers to sell and publish their writings, and many of its books deny the Holocaust, it and World War II revisionism being its two leading categories.

Another source said that as of 2005 they were "the major publisher of antisemitic, revisionist, and racist texts in the United States". Noontide Press is also the distributor of the remaining backstock of books published by Ralph Myles, a company set up by libertarian revisionist historian James J. Martin, who sold the remaining stock of Ralph Myles books to the IHR before his death.

- Imperium by Francis Parker Yockey (1963)
- White America by Earnest Sevier Cox (1966)
- The Myth of the Six Million by David L. Hoggan (1969)
- The International Jew
- The Protocols of the Elders of Zion
- Debunking the Genocide Myth by Paul Rassinier (1978)
- Impeachment of Man by Savitri Devi (1991)
- The works of Lawrence Dennis
- Which Way Western Man? by William Gayley Simpson (1986)

== See also ==
- The Barnes Review
- American Free Press
