= William John Cox =

American lawyer (born 1941)

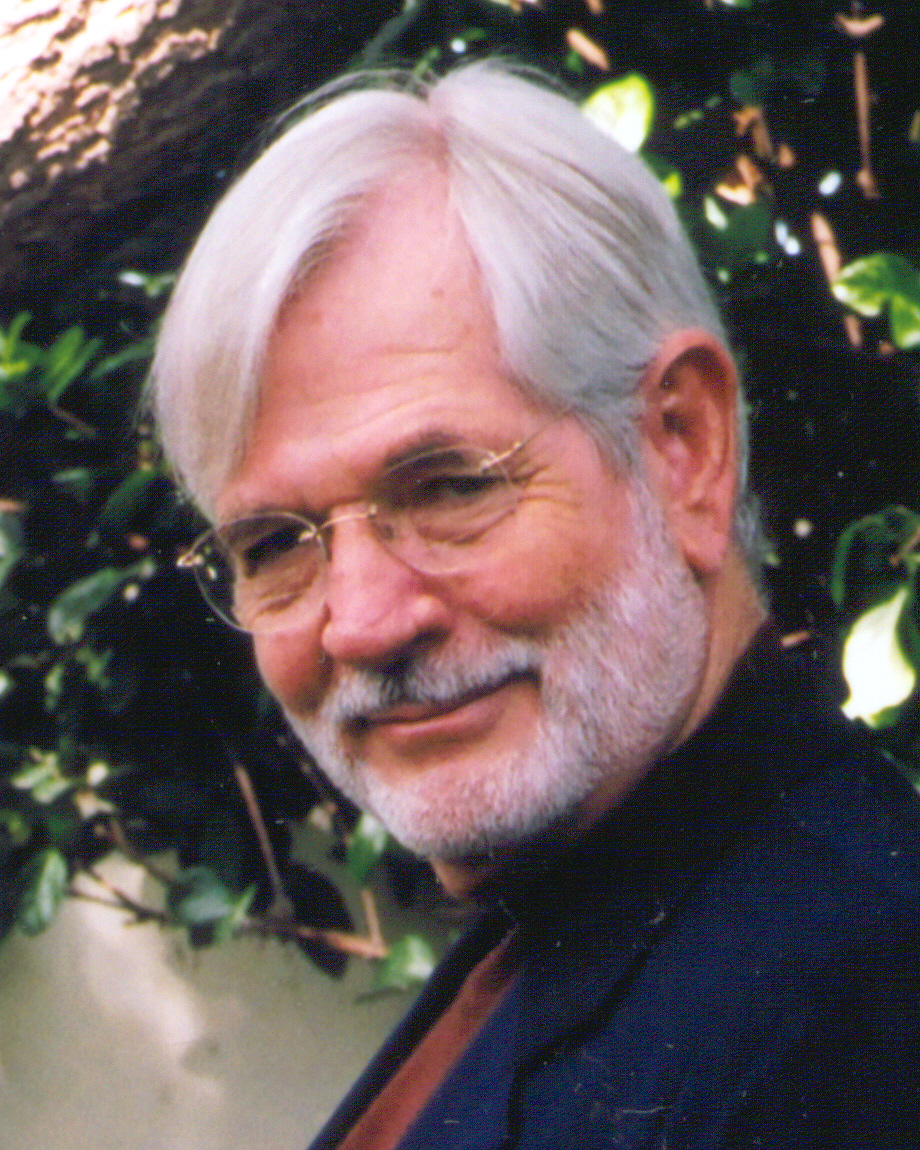
- Cox in 2004
- Born: February 15, 1941 (age 85); Lubbock, Texas, U.S.
- Education: Rio Hondo College (AS); Southwestern Law School (JD)
- Occupations: Lawyer; author

William John "Billy Jack" Cox (born February 15, 1941) is an American public interest lawyer and author.

== Biography ==
=== Early career ===
Employed in 1962 by the El Cajon Police Department, he attended the nearby San Diego Police Department Academy. In 1968, Cox transferred to the Los Angeles Police Department where he graduated from the Police Academy. He received an associate degree in Police Administration from Rio Hondo College.

In 1974 he was appointed a Deputy Los Angeles County District Attorney.

Believing that control of the United States government had been seized by special interest groups and no longer cared for the voters who elected it, Cox filed a pro bono class action lawsuit on July 9, 1979, on behalf of every American citizen directly in the Supreme Court of the United States, which was denied without comment.

=== Holocaust Case ===
Cox later represented Mel Mermelstein, a Jewish survivor of the Auschwitz concentration camp. Cox investigated and sued a group of radical right-wing organizations, including the Liberty Lobby and Institute for Historical Review, that engaged in Holocaust denial and which had offered a reward for proof of Nazi gas chambers. The primary legal issue in the case was resolved in October 1981, when Los Angeles County Superior Court Judge Thomas T. Johnson took judicial notice of the fact that "Jews were gassed to death at Auschwitz in the summer of 1944." The Holocaust Case was the subject of the 1991 TNT motion picture, Never Forget, produced by and starring Leonard Nimoy.

=== Dead Sea Scrolls ===
In 1991, Cox arranged for the publication of almost 1,800 photographs of the Dead Sea Scrolls under the control of the École Biblique that had been suppressed for more than 40 years. He signed a contract with the Biblical Archaeology Society to publish A Facsimile Edition of the Dead Sea Scrolls in November 1991. The Huntington Library in California subsequently allowed all "qualified scholars" to study its set of photographs, and the Israel Antiquities Authority permitted the publication of a microfiche edition.

=== Later career ===
Between 1999 and 2007, Cox served as a supervising trial counsel for the State Bar of California. In 2012, Cox drafted and commenced circulation of the United States Voters' Rights Amendment (USVRA) to the U.S. Constitution, which provides for national paid voting holidays, a national hand-countable paper ballot, and a process for the people to have a more direct role in the formulation of public policy. Moreover, it mandates voter registration and prohibits voter suppression, restricts gerrymandering and lengthy campaigns, and it encourages public financing of elections and discourages paid lobbying. Finally, it eliminates the Electoral College to allow for open primaries and the popular election of presidents.
