= Imperium (Yockey book) =

1948 book by Francis Parker Yockey

Imperium: The Philosophy of History and Politics
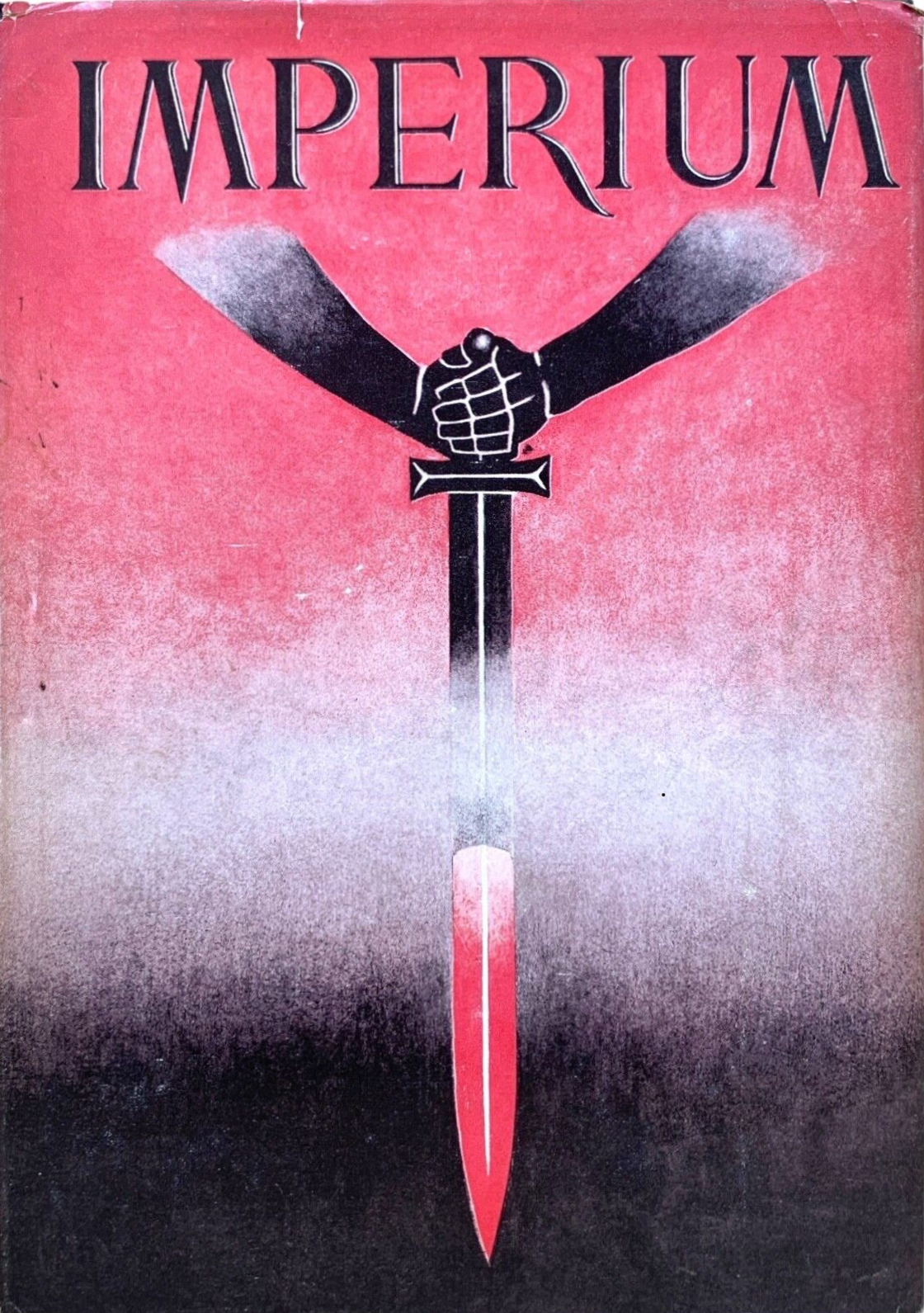
- Cover of the 1963 Noontide issue
- Author: Francis Parker Yockey
- Language: English
- Subject: Philosophy of history Political philosophy
- Published: Westropa Press (1948); Noontide Press (1963)
- Publication place: United Kingdom
- Media type: Print
- Pages: 405
- OCLC: 12745996
- Dewey Decimal: 901.94
- LC Class: CB425 .Y6 1948

Imperium (later editions subtitled The Philosophy of History and Politics) is a 1948 book by Francis Parker Yockey, using the pen name Ulick Varange, that argues for a pan-European fascist empire. It was originally published in the United Kingdom in 1948 by Westropa Press. Later that year, the book's rights were bought by American antisemite Willis Carto, who republished the book in several editions with his Noontide Press starting in 1963. The book sold over 20,000 copies in the United States, and has been translated into several languages.

Imperium presents an antisemitic theory of history, asserts that the Holocaust was a hoax, and is dedicated to "the hero of the Second World War", meant to describe Adolf Hitler. The book was influential on the far-right and on antisemitic thought.

== Summary ==
The book is dedicated to "the hero of the Second World War", meant to describe Adolf Hitler. Following Spengler, Yockey identified eight "high cultures" in world history, which he saw as spiritual superorganisms which impress humans into their service. He argued that these cultures have their own souls which determine their religious expression, science, art forms, politics and morality through succeeding life phases of birth, growth, maturity, fulfillment of destiny, and death. He described races as "spirituo-biological" entities, raw material for cultural expression and history, but criticized strictly biological racial theories as crude.

Yockey wrote that the fulfillment of the Western high culture was threatened by "cultural pathology", including what he claimed were interrelated sicknesses of "culture-parasitism", "culture-retardation" and "culture-distortion". He alleged that Jews were most harmful to the West because he saw them as aggravating its organic "culture-crisis", which he associated with the rise of materialism and rationalism since 1750. He wrote that America was more susceptible to "culture-distortion" than any other Western nation because, he argued, America as a colonial offshoot of Western culture was founded on an ideology of rationalism and materialism, lacking the spiritual depth of Europe.

Imperium presents an antisemitic theory of history, believing that each life phase of high culture has its unique "Spirit of the Age", Yockey considered fascism and Nazism to be expressions of this spirit in the new epoch. According to him, Hitler set the West toward a proper fulfillment of its destiny as a unified empire, while in order to stop it America sided with Russia, which Yockey saw as distinct from the Western culture. Yockey alleged that the postwar Nuremberg trials were "show trials" directed by these "extra-European forces". He denied the Holocaust (although he reportedly praised it in private), and claimed that photographic evidence of the Nazis' gas chambers was faked.

== Background ==
Despite the influential status of the book, Yockey was a mysterious figure and very little is known about his life. Yockey adopted the ideas of German philosopher of history Oswald Spengler in Imperium, although Yockey's explicit antisemitism differentiated him from Spengler. Spengler's The Decline of the West was the most important single source. Yockey's views on the role of the state drew from the friend–enemy thesis of Nazi political theorist Carl Schmitt (whom Yockey has been accused of plagiarizing). Yockey heavily drew on the great man theory of Thomas Carlyle, seeing the creative ability of heroic individuals as a vehicle for progress. The book allegedly was written in six months beginning in 1947.

== Publication ==
Yockey wrote Imperium at an inn in Brittas Bay, Ireland. The book spanned 600 pages in two volumes. In Yockey's pseudonym, Ulick Varange, Ulick was meant to be an Irish name, and Varange was a reference to Norsemen. Yockey invited the British fascist Oswald Mosley to publish Imperium in his name, but Mosley refused. Publication was financed by the Mosleyites Guy Chesham, Peter Huxley-Blythe and Yockey's mistress Baroness Alice von Pflugl. A thousand copies of the first volume, and 200 copies of the second volume, were printed in London by Westropa Press.

The American far-right activist and antisemite Willis Carto, a Yockey supporter, acquired the rights to Imperium from Westropa. The 1963 Noontide Press edition, published after Yockey's suicide in jail in 1960, included an introduction by Carto. This edition carried the subtitle The Philosophy of History and Politics. Carto republished Imperium as a paperback with Noontide in 1969, and they published it in a third edition in 1991. The book sold well in the United States, at over 20,000 copies from the Noontide editions. It has been translated into several languages, including Spanish and German.

== Analysis and reception ==
Imperium has been called one of the most influential antisemitic books since Hitler's Mein Kampf, and a "neo-Mein Kampf for neo-Nazis". It is known for being extremely difficult to read. Writers John George and Laird Wilcox wrote that "much of the book's enduring reputation lies in its incomprehensibility [...] In the tiny community of neo-Nazism, Imperium is the 'bible' few people have thoroughly read and almost nobody understands", though "many have tried". They further wrote that it was distinguished by a partial "flight of ideas" aspect, which they argued "suggests instability and disorganization".

It has influenced various far-right activists worldwide, including supporters of a "Eurasian" racial imperium in Europe and Russia. It influenced the American neo-Nazi occultist James H. Madole, the racial Odinist Else Christensen, the fascist Christian Bouchet and the British neo-Nazi David Myatt. But according to academic Jeffrey Kaplan, some others on the far right considered Imperium the "impenetrable ramblings of a madman".

The book's ideology was adopted by Willis Carto for the National Youth Alliance and some members of groups such as the Liberty Lobby (founded by Carto) and the American Independent Party. Liberty Lobby and its spinoffs promoted Imperium as the Mein Kampf of postwar Nazism. The book was also sold for several years through the catalog of David Duke, the former Ku Klux Klan grand wizard.
