= Mark Weber =

American Holocaust denier (born 1951)

- Born: October 9, 1951 (age 75); Portland, Oregon, USA
- Education: Portland State University, Indiana University
- Occupation: historian

Mark Edward Weber (born October 9, 1951) is an American Holocaust denier, who is the director of the Institute for Historical Review, a United States, California-based Holocaust denial organization. Weber has been associated with the IHR since the 1980s. In 1992, he became editor-in-chief of the IHR's pseudoacademic Journal of Historical Review. Weber was subsequently named the institute's Director in 1995.

Weber was born in Portland, Oregon, in 1951. After graduating from Jesuit High School in 1969, he studied history in Chicago at the University of Illinois. He continued his studies for two semesters at LMU Munich, and, returning to Oregon, took a B.A. degree in history with high honors from Portland State University. In graduate school, he continued his study of history at Indiana University, receiving an M.A. degree in modern European history in 1977. Beginning in 1978, Weber became involved with the National Alliance, a far-right white supremacist organization. In 1979 Weber served as the editor of the group's magazine, the National Vanguard. Throughout the 1980s, Weber functioned as the treasurer of the National Alliance's Cosmotheist Church. During this period, Weber became more heavily involved with the IHR as well as collaborating with Bradley Smith and the Committee for Open Debate on the Holocaust (CODOH).

In 2018, Weber was denied entry to the United Kingdom.
