= Stipulation =

Formal legal acknowledgment and agreement

In United States law, a stipulation is a formal legal acknowledgment and agreement made between opposing parties before a pending hearing or trial.

For example, both parties might stipulate to certain facts and so not have to argue them in court. After the stipulation is entered into, it is presented to the judge.

The word is derived from the Latin word stipula "straw." The Ancient Roman custom was that the negotiating parties, upon reaching an agreement, broke a straw as a sign of their agreement and wrote down the agreement's rules (stipulationes).
