= Mel Mermelstein =

Hungarian-born Jewish Holocaust survivor (1926–2022)

- Born: Moric Mermelstein; September 22, 1926; Örösveg, Czechoslovakia (now part of Ukraine, near Munkacs)
- Died: January 28, 2022 (aged 95); Long Beach, California, United States

Melvin Mermelstein (born Moric Mermelstein; September 25, 1926 – January 28, 2022) was a Czechoslovak-born American Holocaust survivor and autobiographer. A Jew, he was the sole survivor of his family's extermination at Auschwitz concentration camp.

He is best known for his litigation with the Institute for Historical Review over evidence of gas chambers in German concentration camps during World War II. The legal dispute was resolved in Mermelstein's favor, without the court giving an opinion on the merits of the dispute, since it ruled that the existence of gas chambers at Auschwitz is a legally indisputable fact.

== Life and career ==
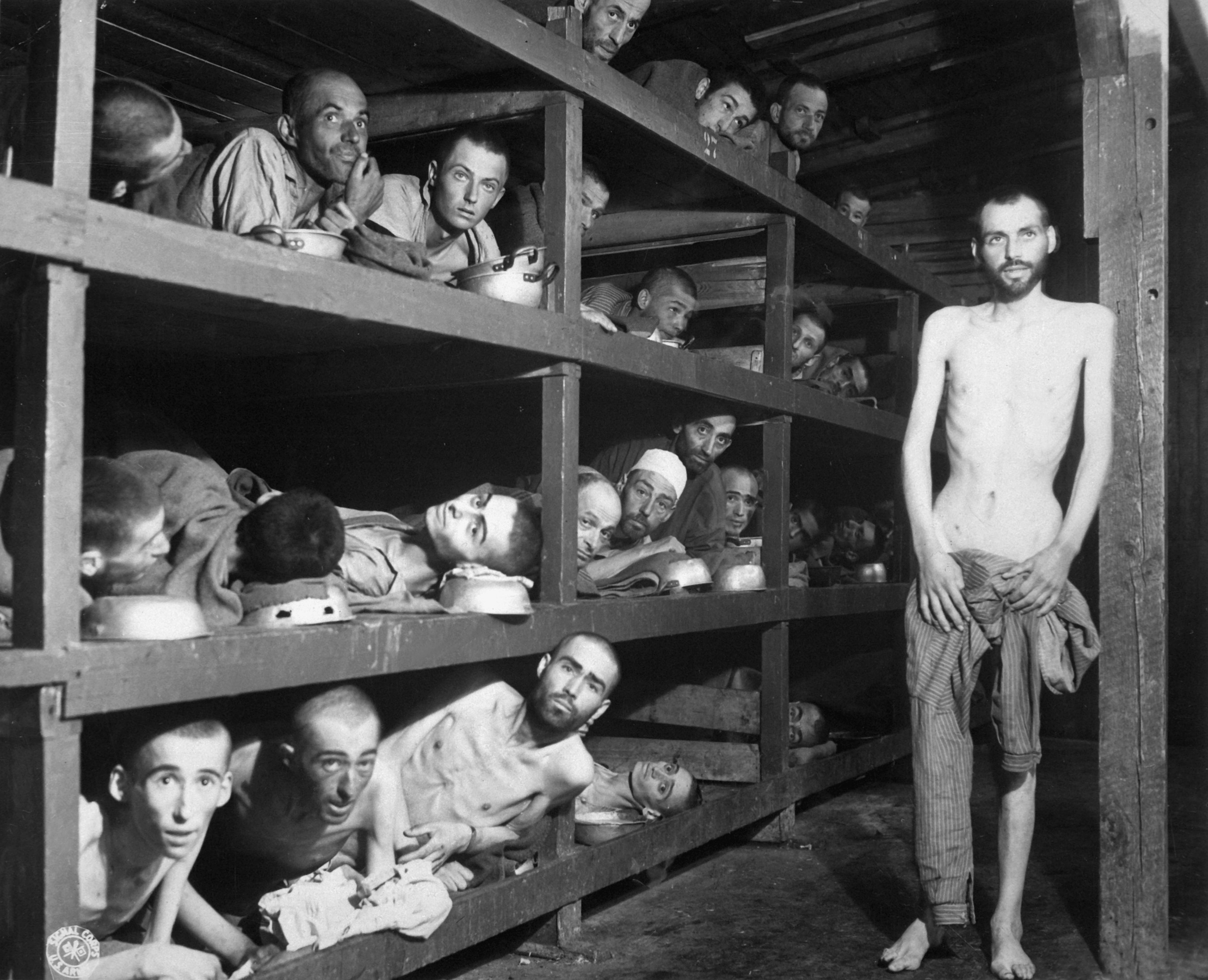
Buchenwald, 1945. Mel Mermelstein is on the top bunk at the far right

Mermelstein was born in Örösveg, the son of Fani, a homemaker, and Herman-Bernad Mermelstein, a winemaker. Before World War II broke out, Mermelstein lived in Munkacs, then part of Czechoslovakia (occupied by Hungary in 1938). On May 19, 1944, he was deported to the Auschwitz concentration camp. Mermelstein spent a little less than one year at Auschwitz, then in January 1945 he was sent on a death march with 3,200 other prisoners to the Gross-Rosen concentration camp. From there he was sent on a train without food or water to Buchenwald concentration camp, where he arrived suffering with typhus and weighing only 68 pounds. He spent two months at Buchenwald until he was liberated by U.S. troops on April 11, 1945. His parents, two sisters, and a brother were murdered in the camps. Before his father's death, Mermelstein had promised his father he would tell everyone what the Nazis were doing.

=== The Institute for Historical Review ===
In 1980, the Institute for Historical Review (IHR) promised a $50,000 reward to anyone who could prove that Jews were gassed at Auschwitz.

Mermelstein wrote a letter to the editors of the Los Angeles Times and others, including The Jerusalem Post. The Institute for Historical Review wrote back, offering him $50,000 for proof that Jews were, in fact, gassed in the gas chambers at Auschwitz. Mermelstein, in turn, submitted a notarized account of his internment at Auschwitz and how in 1944 he witnessed Nazi guards ushering his mother and two sisters and others towards (as he learned later) gas chamber number five.

The IHR refused to pay the reward, stating that Mermelstein's notarized account was "not sufficient proof". Represented by public interest attorney William John Cox, Mermelstein subsequently sued the IHR in the Superior Court of Los Angeles County for breach of contract, anticipatory repudiation, libel, injurious denial of established fact, intentional infliction of emotional distress, and declaratory relief (see case no. C 356 542). On October 9, 1981, both parties in the Mermelstein case filed motions for summary judgment in consideration of which Judge Thomas T. Johnson of the Superior Court of Los Angeles County took "judicial notice of the fact that Jews were gassed to death at the Auschwitz Concentration Camp in Poland during the summer of 1944", judicial notice meaning that the court treated the gas chambers as common knowledge, and therefore did not require evidence that the gas chambers existed. On August 5, 1985, Judge Robert A. Wenke entered a judgment based upon the Stipulation for Entry of Judgment agreed upon by the parties on July 22, 1985. The judgment required IHR and other defendants to pay $90,000 to Mermelstein and to issue a letter of apology to "Mr. Mel Mermelstein, a survivor of Auschwitz-Birkenau and Buchenwald, and all other survivors of Auschwitz" for "pain, anguish and suffering" caused to them.

In a pre-trial determination, Judge Thomas T. Johnson declared:

This court does take judicial notice of the fact that Jews were gassed to death at Auschwitz Concentration Camp in Poland during the summer of 1944. It is not reasonably subject to dispute. And it is capable of immediate and accurate determination by resort to sources of reasonably indisputable accuracy. It is simply a fact.

In California, the Evidence Code permits the Court to take judicial notice of "facts and propositions of generalized knowledge that are so universally known that they cannot reasonably be the subject of dispute".

In 1986, the IHR, along with its founder Willis Carto, sued Mermelstein for allegedly libeling them during an interview with a New York City radio station, but dropped the lawsuit in 1988. Mermelstein also sued the IHR in 1988 for an article in the IHR Newsletter that examined what it considered to be flaws and inconsistencies in his 1981 lawsuit testimony.

In 1988, Mermelstein (who was a member of the International Auschwitz Committee) included photo-enlarged copies of IHR's checks to him totaling $90,000 along with their apology letter in the exhibit "From Ashes to Life" at the Mills House Art Gallery in Garden Grove, California. The exhibit also included other Holocaust documentation from Mermelstein's collection, including photos of his family and of other emaciated camp victims and survivors.

Mermelstein was portrayed by Leonard Nimoy and Cox was played by Dabney Coleman in a 1991 TV film, Never Forget, about the 1981 lawsuit. He wrote of the court battle in his autobiography, titled By Bread Alone.

About these so-called deniers of The Holocaust, and who they really are, see my letter to the editors dated August 1980 in my book By Bread Alone, The Story of A-4685.

— Mel Mermelstein

== Death ==
Mermelstein died from complications of COVID-19 at home in Long Beach, California, on January 28, 2022. He was 95.

== Works ==
- By bread alone (1981) Auschwitz Study Foundation. ISBN 0-9606534-0-6.
