= Judicial notice =

Evidence law rule about commonly known facts

Judicial notice is a rule in the law of evidence that allows a fact to be introduced into evidence if the truth of that fact is so notorious or well-known, or so authoritatively attested, that it cannot reasonably be doubted. This is done upon the request of the party seeking to rely on the fact at issue. Facts and materials admitted under judicial notice are accepted without being formally introduced by a witness or other rule of evidence, even if one party wishes to plead evidence to the contrary.

Judicial notice is frequently used for the simplest, most obvious common sense facts, such as which day of the week corresponded to a particular calendar date or the approximate time at sunset. However, it could even be used within one jurisdiction to notice a law of another jurisdiction.

== Judicial notice in the United States ==
=== Judicial notice in the Federal Rules of Evidence ===
In the United States, Article II of the Federal Rules of Evidence ("FRE") addresses judicial notice in federal courts, and this article is widely copied by U.S. States. Article II of the FRE consists of a single rule, Rule 201. FRE 201 covers judicial notice of adjudicative facts, which are those concerning the parties to a proceeding, but not of legislative facts, which are general.

FRE 201(b) permits judges to take judicial notice of two categories of facts:

1. Those that are "generally known within the territorial jurisdiction of the trial court" (e.g. locations of streets within the court's jurisdiction) or
2. Those that are "capable of accurate and ready determination by resort to sources whose accuracy cannot reasonably be questioned" (e.g. the day of the week on a certain date).

FRE 201(c) notes that judicial notice may be permissive or mandatory. Under the wording of the rule, judicial notice is permissive if the court takes such notice on its own but mandatory if a party requests it and the court is supplied with the necessary information.

Courts have ruled that judicial notice must be taken of federal public laws and treaties, state public laws, and official regulations of both federal and local government agencies.

A trial court's decision to take judicial notice or not to do so is reviewed on appeal under the standard of abuse of discretion.

=== Judicial notice and the burden of proof ===
FRE 201(f) establishes that the effect of the court taking judicial notice is different in civil and criminal trials. In a civil trial, the fact taken notice of is thereby conclusively proved. In a criminal case, the defendant has the right to contest every fact that might tend to incriminate him. Therefore, the court taking judicial notice would simply allow the jury to make the finding that the court took notice of, but would not require this outcome, and would not prevent the defense from presenting evidence to rebut the noticed fact.

=== Judicial notice in foreign affairs ===
Legal disputes about foreign affairs are generally settled by judicial notice by obtaining the information directly from the office of the Secretary of State (in the United States). For example, if a litigant in an extradition hearing attempted to argue that Israel was not a sovereign state, a statement from the Secretary of State that the U.S. recognized Israel as a sovereign state would settle the issue and no evidence could be led to the contrary. (In the United Kingdom, similar result could be had to information from the Foreign Secretary.)

Federal courts and the courts of most jurisdictions have determined that matters of foreign law are subject to permissive judicial notice.

=== Official notice ===
During the prosecution phase of U.S. patent applications, a similar concept to judicial notice is applied by patent examiners, but the process is referred to as taking "official notice". In a typical patent claim rejection, the examiner has to present prima facie evidence from the prior art, usually patent documents or other printed publications, that the subject matter of a rejected claim was known or would have been obvious prior to the application for patent by the inventor. However, examiners may officially notice facts that "are capable of instant and unquestionable demonstration as being well-known". Patent applicants are then allowed to traverse the official notice given by an examiner, in which case the examiner must present an evidentiary document to prove the fact or limitation is well known.

=== Historical examples ===
In the 1858 murder trial of William Armstrong, his attorney, then-former Congressman Abraham Lincoln, used judicial notice to establish that a claim by a witness to have used moonlight to see events could not have taken place since there was no visible moon that evening. This led to Armstrong's acquittal.

In the 1934 United States Supreme Court case Home Building & Loan Association v. Blaisdell, Chief Justice Charles Evans Hughes took judicial notice of the economic conditions of the Great Depression to help conclude that a state of emergency existed, and thus the State of Minnesota could properly impose on the contracts made by private persons to promote a broad societal interest. Specifically, the Court upheld a Minnesota statute preventing loan companies from foreclosing on homes before 1935, despite mortgage agreements allowing companies the right to do so.

In the 1981 case of Mel Mermelstein v. Institute for Historical Review, the Superior Court of Los Angeles County took judicial notice of the fact that Jews were gassed to death at the Auschwitz Concentration Camp in 1944.

== Judicial notice in Australia ==
In Australia, judicial notice may be taken of facts that are "not reasonably open to question". This may include, for example, the location of well-known geographical features. However, both parties must be given notice of the judicial officer's intention to rely upon the information.

== Judicial notice in Canada ==
Besides the categories of judicially noticed facts found in other common law jurisdictions, the Supreme Court of Canada has required Canadian courts to take judicial notice (connaissance d'office) of such facts as the history of colonialism in Canada and its harmful effects on Indigenous peoples:

To be clear, courts must take judicial notice of such matters as the history of colonialism, displacement, and residential schools and how that history continues to translate into lower educational attainment, lower incomes, higher unemployment, higher rates of substance abuse and suicide, and of course higher levels of incarceration for Aboriginal peoples.

—R. v. Ipeelee, at para. 60

Some judges have taken a similar approach to the history of racism against other ethnic groups in Canada, such as African Canadians, concerning whom Justice Nakatsuru of the Ontario Superior Court of Justice wrote:

I find that for African Canadians, the time has come where I as a sentencing judge must take judicial notice of such matters as the history of colonialism (in Canada and elsewhere), slavery, policies and practices of segregation, intergenerational trauma, and racism both overt and systemic as they relate to African Canadians and how that has translated into socio-economic ills and higher levels of incarceration.

—R. v. Jackson, at para. 82

However, some other judges have declined to follow this approach.
