= Institute for Historical Review =

American Holocaust denial group

- Abbreviation: IHR
- Formation: 1978
- Location: Fountain Valley, California, U.S.
- Key people: David McCalden (founder); Willis Carto (co-founder); Mark Weber (president)
- Parent organization: Legion for the Survival of Freedom
- Website: ihr.org

The Institute for Historical Review (IHR) is a United States–based nonprofit organization that promotes Holocaust denial. It is considered by many scholars to be central to the international Holocaust denial movement. Self-described as a "historical revisionist" organization, the IHR promotes antisemitic viewpoints and has links to several neo-Nazi and neo-fascist organizations.

The group was founded in 1978 in Torrance, California, by David McCalden and Willis Carto, and is headquartered in Fountain Valley, California. It published the Journal of Historical Review until 2002, but now disseminates its materials through its website and via email. The parent corporation of the IHR and the affiliated Noontide Press is the Legion for the Survival of Freedom.

== History ==
The IHR was founded in 1978 by David McCalden, also known as Lewis Brandon, a former member of the British National Front, and Willis Carto, the head of the now-defunct Liberty Lobby. Liberty Lobby was an antisemitic organization best known for publishing The Spotlight, now reorganized as the American Free Press. Austin App, a La Salle University professor credited with being the first major American Holocaust denier, inspired the creation of the IHR.

=== Mel Mermelstein case ===
At the IHR's first conference in 1979, IHR publicly offered a reward of $50,000 for verifiable "proof that gas chambers for the purpose of killing human beings existed at or in Auschwitz." This money (and an additional $40,000) was eventually paid in 1985 to Auschwitz survivor Mel Mermelstein, who, represented by public-interest lawyer William John Cox, sued the IHR for breach of contract for initially ignoring his evidence (a signed testimony of his experiences in Auschwitz). On October 9, 1981, both parties in the Mermelstein case filed motions for summary judgment in consideration of which Judge Thomas T. Johnson of the Superior Court of Los Angeles County took "judicial notice of the fact that Jews were gassed to death at the Auschwitz Concentration Camp in occupied Poland during the summer of 1944."

On August 5, 1985, Judge Robert A. Wenke entered a judgment based upon the Stipulation for Entry of Judgment agreed upon by the parties on July 22, 1985. The judgment required IHR and other defendants to pay $90,000 to Mermelstein and to issue a letter of apology to "Mr. Mel Mermelstein, a survivor of Auschwitz-Birkenau and Buchenwald, and all other survivors of Auschwitz" for "pain, anguish and suffering" caused to them.

McCalden and Carto had a falling out over the Mel Mermelstein case, and in 1981 Carto fired McCalden as IHR director. In response, McCalden attacked IHR members and associates in his Revisionist Newsletter, including Carto, H. Keith Thompson, and Keith Stimely. From 1982 to 1983, Stimely was assistant director of the IHR and was the editor of their Journal of Historical Review from 1983 to 1985.

In February 1985, Stimely quit the IHR, claiming that Carto had, without consulting him, removed part of an article by Robert Faurisson that was critical of David Irving from the Journal of Historical Review; he was also aggrieved that Carto had refused to include a Francis Parker Yockey book, The Enemy of Europe, in his Noontide Press catalog because he considered it too anti-American. Stimely proceeded to denounce Carto and say that he had never understood Yockey, writing that "Yockey was, at the bottom of his heart, an artist; Carto is, at the bottom of his heart, a travelling salesman". He wrote a resignation letter entitled The Problem of Willis A. Carto or Goodbye to All That!

Tom Marcellus became its director. in 1971, Marcellus was a field staff member for the Church of Scientology and was an editor for one of the church's publications. When Marcellus left IHR in 1995, Mark Weber, the editor of the IHR's Journal of Historical Review (JHR) since 1992, took over as its director, and has been the IHR's director and spokesman since then.

=== Attacks by the JDL ===
The IHR was the target of the far-right Jewish organization the Jewish Defense League for many years. Shortly before the IHR's office got firebombed on June 25, 1981, a man claiming to represent the "Jewish Defenders" called the news agency United Press International threatening to firebomb the IHR's HQ. The office only sustained minor damage, a search turned up no bombs in the building, and no one was arrested. On April 5, 1982, the office was firebombed for a second time, this time causing damage to a copy machine, some furniture and some records. A man once again called into a news agency claiming to represent the "Jewish Defenders", this time to the newspaper Daily Breeze. On Sept. 5, 1982, the office was the target of a drive-by shooting, which only caused minimal damage and no injuries.

On July 4, 1984, a third firebombing destroyed the institute's offices and warehouse. Thousands of books, cassette tapes, pamphlets, and 90% of its inventory were lost. Carto had not insured the facilities or stock. They then moved to a new building in Costa Mesa, California. In 2002, during the trial of Earl Krugel for trying to send explosives to congressman Darrell Issa and the King Fahd Mosque in Culver City, California, it was revealed that Krugel had admitted to an FBI informant in November 2001 that he firebombed a "Nazi bookstore". The FBI informant was originally trying to get information on if JDL members had ever firebombed ADL offices, and Krugel replied with "Nobody hit the ADL although they deserve it richly.", and then "Uh, no it was on the uh, bookstore... that Nazi bookstore... the Holocaust deniers." The informant then replied with "I remember you telling me something about that.". Krugel then said "That was beautiful, man. I did it. It was better than I expected." A law enforcement source familiar with the probe said investigators strongly believe Krugel is referring to firebombings of IHR offices and warehouses.

The JDL had been known to protest the IHR's conferences where a few hundred attendees come to listen or give speeches. According to JDL chairman Irv Rubin, the JDL threatened to protest inside and outside the Red Lion Inn, which was the first location for the 1989 conference. Rubin also reportedly said that several Jewish groups and newspapers agreed to call the hotel to "apply pressure in that regard. If it worked, it worked beautifully.”. However Steve Giblin, executive vice president of Red Lion Hotels & Inns in Vancouver, stated it was a mutual agreement to cancel the event and change venues because of scheduling conflicts. He also stated that he did not receive an ultimatum from the JDL, and only received two or three phone calls about the IHR. Their 1989 conference had reportedly been forced to move locations twice after protests from the JDL, before finally carrying out the conference in the basement of the German Community Church in the Old World Village of Huntington Beach, California.

=== Ouster of Carto and later history ===
In the 1980s, the IHR's members, principally Marcellus and Weber, seeing the IHR as a serious group, became increasingly embarrassed by how outspoken Carto was in his antisemitism. They also began to dispute over Carto's usage of funds. They alleged that Carto fled with several millions of dollars that were supposed to have gone to the IHR. This resulted in a lawsuit. in 1993, they wrote a document, published in the Journal, rebuking him and calling him a liability that had contributed little to the IHR. They voted to oust him. In 1996, IHR won a $6,430,000 judgment in the lawsuit against Carto in which IHR alleged that Carto embezzled $7.5 million that had been left to Legion for the Survival of Freedom, the parent corporation of IHR, from the estate of Jean Edison Farrel.

In 2001, Eric Owens, a former employee, alleged that Mark Weber and Greg Raven from the IHR's staff had been planning to sell their mailing lists to either the Anti-Defamation League or the Church of Scientology.

Since 2009, Weber has pushed to broaden the institute's mandate. In January 2009, Weber released an essay titled, "How Relevant Is Holocaust Revisionism?" In it, he acknowledged the death of millions of Jews but did not wholly reject Holocaust denial. He noted that Holocaust denial had attracted little support over the years: "It's gotten some support in Iran, or places like that, but as far as I know, there is no history department supporting writing by these folks." Accordingly, he recommended that emphasis be placed instead on opposing "Jewish-Zionist power", which some commentators claim was a shift to a directly antisemitic position.

== Holocaust denial ==
Although the IHR comments on a variety of subjects, it is most criticized for its Holocaust denial. IHR is widely regarded as antisemitic and as having links to neo-Nazi organizations. Multiple writers have stated that its primary focus is denying key facts of Nazism and the genocide of Jews.

When the IHR devoted itself to publishing Holocaust-denial material, it insisted that its work in this regard was "revisionism" rather than denial:

The Institute does not "deny the Holocaust." Every responsible scholar of twentieth century history acknowledges the great catastrophe that befell European Jewry during World War II. All the same, the IHR has over the years published detailed books and numerous probing essays that call into question aspects of the orthodox, Holocaust-extermination story, and highlight specific Holocaust exaggerations and falsehoods.

On the IHR website, Barbara Kulaszka defends the distinction between "denial" and "revisionism" by arguing that considerable revisions to history have been made over the years by historians and concludes:

For purposes of their own, powerful, special-interest groups desperately seek to keep substantive discussion of the Holocaust story taboo. One of the ways they do this is by purposely mischaracterizing revisionist scholars as "deniers."

American environmentalist Paul Rauber wrote:

The question [of whether the IHR denies the Holocaust] appears to turn on IHR's Humpty-Dumpty word game with the word Holocaust. According to Mark Weber, associate editor of the IHR's Journal of Historical Review [now Director of the IHR], "If by the 'Holocaust' you mean the political persecution of Jews, some scattered killings, if you mean a cruel thing that happened, no one denies that. But if one says that the 'Holocaust' means the systematic extermination of six to eight million Jews in concentration camps, that's what we think there's not evidence for." That is, IHR doesn't deny that the Holocaust happened; they just deny that the word 'Holocaust' means what people customarily use it for.

According to British historian of Germany Richard J. Evans:

Like many individual Holocaust deniers, the Institute as a body denied that it was involved in Holocaust denial. It called this a 'smear' which was 'completely at variance with the facts' because 'revisionist scholars' such as Faurisson, Butz 'and bestselling British historian David Irving acknowledge that hundreds of thousands of Jews were killed and otherwise perished during the Second World War as a direct and indirect result of the harsh anti-Jewish policies of Germany and its allies'. But the concession that a relatively small number of Jews were killed [has been] routinely used by Holocaust deniers to distract attention from the far more important fact of their refusal to admit that the figure ran into the millions, and that a large proportion of these victims were systematically murdered by gassing as well as by shooting.

In 2007, the United Kingdom's Channel 4 described the IHR as a "pseudo-academic body based in the United States which is dedicated to denying that the Holocaust happened," while the Pittsburgh Post-Gazette called the IHR a "blatantly anti-Semitic assortment of pseudo-scholars".

The Southern Poverty Law Center lists the IHR as a hate group. In an article for The Jewish Chronicle, British writer Oliver Kamm, described the IHR as being "a pseudo-scholarly body". The British Holocaust denier David Irving delivered a speech to the organisation's congress in 1983. Irving returned to speak at IHR conferences on at least four more occasions, in 1989, 1990, 1992, and 1994.

== Criticism of methods ==
The "Holocaust revisionist" arguments published by the IHR are not regarded as serious historical research by historians and academics; rather, they are regarded as works of pseudo-science aimed at proving that the Holocaust did not happen. The editorial board of one of the leading historical journals, The Journal of American History, wrote, "We all abhor, on both moral and scholarly grounds, the substantive arguments of the Institute for Historical Review. We reject their claims to be taken seriously as historians." In response, IHR printed Weber's letter disputing the claims.

In April 2004, following a complaint by the David S. Wyman Institute for Holocaust Studies, The Nation magazine refused to accept advertising from the IHR, stating "[T]here is a strong presumption against censoring any advertisement, especially if we disagree with its politics. This case, however, is different. Their arguments are 'patently fraudulent.'" Weber responded with critical commentary in a letter to Leigh Novog of the advertising department of The Nation.

== Connections with Arab, Islamic opponents of Israel ==
Issa Nakhleh, an attorney who has served as U.N. Observer of the Arab Higher Committee for Palestine, who already in 1972 openly denied the Holocaust, and, "who, during the 1960s and early 1970s, was associated with Gerald L.K. Smith (writing for Smith’s publication, The Cross and the Flag), and with the racist West Coast group, Western Front, in 1981,... spoke at the Third Annual Convention of the Institute for Historical Review,..." Described as the "chairman of the Palestine-Arab Committee," he was a highlighted speaker and in 1982, he published an article for IHR.

In an article published in Hit List magazine in 2002, author Kevin Coogan claimed there had been attempts to forge ties between American and European Holocaust-denial groups such as the IHR and "radical Middle Eastern extremists." According to Coogan, Ahmed Rami, a former Moroccan military officer "founded Radio Islam to disseminate antisemitic, Holocaust denying, and often pro-Nazi propaganda," and tried to organize, with the IHR, a conference in a Hezbollah-controlled section of Beirut, Lebanon.

The Daily Star, the leading English-language paper in Lebanon, in response to a planned IHR meeting in the country, called its members "loathsome pseudo-historians" and the institute itself an "international hate group." The paper reported "one former PLO official [stating], 'with friends like that, we don't need enemies'." With the help of the anti-Israeli Jordanian Writers Association, an alternative event was held with the theme "What happened to the Revisionist Historians' Conference in Beirut?"

== Journal of Historical Review ==
The IHR published the Journal of Historical Review, which its critics – including the Anti-Defamation League, the Danish Center for Holocaust and Genocide Studies, and other scholars, such as Robert Hanyok, a National Security Agency historian – accused of being pseudo-scientific. Hanyok described IHR as "a well-known forum for that faction of scholars and researchers associated with a movement known as 'Holocaust denial'".

Jonathan Petropoulos wrote on The History Teacher that the "[journal] is shockingly racist and antisemitic: articles on 'America's Failed Racial Policy' and anti-Israel pieces accompany those about gas chambers... They clearly have no business claiming to be a continuation of the revisionist tradition, and should be referred to as 'Holocaust Deniers'."

Weber was the editor of JHR from 1992 to 2002, when the JHR ceased publication. Since 2002, the IHR's main method of spreading its message has been through its website IHR Update and by e-mail.

== Bradley Smith and the CODOH ==
In 1987, Bradley R. Smith, a former media director of the Institute for Historical Review, founded the Committee for Open Debate on the Holocaust (CODOH). In the United States, CODOH has repeatedly attempted to place advertisements questioning whether the Holocaust happened, especially in college campus newspapers.

Bradley Smith took his message to college students—with little success. Smith referred to his tactics as the CODOH campus project. He said, "I don't want to spend time with adults anymore, I want to go to students. They are superficial. They are empty vessels to be filled." "What I wanted to do was I wanted to set forth three or four ideas that students might be interested in, that might cause them to think about things or to have questions about things. And I wanted to make it as simple as possible, and to set it up in a way that could not really be debated." Holocaust deniers have placed "Full-page advertisements in college and university newspapers, including those of Brandeis University, Boston College, Pennsylvania State University, and Queens College. Some of these ads arguing that the Holocaust never happened ran without comment; others generated op-ed pieces by professors and students". On September 8, 2009, student newspaper The Harvard Crimson ran a paid ad from Bradley R Smith. It was quickly criticized, and the editor issued an apology, saying publishing the ad was a mistake.
