= Sabina Citron =

Polish-Canadian Jewish activist (1928–2023)

- Citron in 1983
- Born: August 4, 1928; Łódź, Poland
- Died: September 27, 2023 (aged 95); Jerusalem, Israel
- Known for: Holocaust survivor; founder and spokesperson of the Canadian Holocaust Remembrance Association; author

Sabina Citron (August 4, 1928 – September 27, 2023) was a Polish-Canadian Holocaust survivor. She was a founder and spokesperson of the Canadian Holocaust Remembrance Association, charged a Nazi propagandist under the Canadian Criminal Code with spreading false news in relation to the Holocaust, and prevailed in a civil lawsuit for libel against Hungarian war criminal Imre Finta. She authored The Indictment.

== Early life ==
Sabina Citron was born in Łódź, Poland on August 4, 1928. She performed forced labour in an ammunition factory during World War II.

Later during the Holocaust, she was incarcerated in Auschwitz concentration camp, where her oldest brother died. Although the rest of Citron's close relatives managed to survive, almost all of her extended family were killed. She moved to Israel in 1948, later immigrated to Toronto, Canada. She later returned to Israel, living in Jerusalem until her death in 2023.

== Later life ==
Citron became a founder and spokesperson of the Canadian Holocaust Remembrance Association.

In 1983 Citron began a private prosecution under the Canadian Criminal Code against Nazi propagandist Ernst Zündel, a Holocaust denier and pamphleteer, charging him with spreading false news.

The charges were based on two pamphlets he had published. Citron alleged that the publications were "likely to cause mischief to the public interest in social and racial tolerance". The case was taken over by the Crown Attorney's office, and Zündel was convicted and sentenced to 15 months in jail.

However, on appeal to the Ontario Court of Appeal, the conviction was set aside and a re-trial ordered, due to procedural errors made by the trial judge. Zündel was again convicted at the re-trial and appealed, first to the Ontario Court of Appeal, which dismissed the appeal, and then to the Supreme Court of Canada, which allowed the appeal, overturning the decisions of the courts below. In its decision, the Supreme Court held that the charge of spreading false news was unconstitutional, because it infringed the guarantee of freedom of expression in the Canadian Charter of Rights and Freedoms.

Citron also prevailed in a civil lawsuit for libel against Imre Finta, after he accused her of being a liar for saying that he had committed war crimes.

Citron was the author of The Indictment: The Arab-Israeli Conflict in Historical Perspective (Gefen Publishing House Ltd, 2006). The book primarily focuses on the Arab–Israeli conflict rather than Citron's experiences during the Holocaust.

== Death ==
Sabina Citron died at her apartment in Jerusalem on September 27, 2023, at the age of 95.
