= Nizkor Project =

Website dedicated to countering Holocaust denial

- Website type: Educational, anti-fascism
- Available in: English
- Owner: B'nai Brith Canada
- Website: nizkor.org

The Nizkor Project (Hebrew: נִזְכּוֹר, "we will remember") is an Internet-based project run by B'nai Brith Canada which is dedicated to countering Holocaust denial.

== About the project ==
The website was founded by Ken McVay as a central Web-based archive for the large numbers of documents made publicly available by the users of the newsgroup alt.revisionism and gifted to B'nai Brith Canada in 2010.

The site also archives numerous postings made to the newsgroup since the early 1990s. It does not archive every single posting ever made to the newsgroup; rather, the maintainers of the web site have selected various messages for display that are seen as presenting factual information about the Holocaust; or, in the case of some posters, about the authors of the messages themselves.

In addition to providing an extensive archive of documents regarding the Holocaust, including the transcripts of the 1st Nuremberg Tribunal, the Nizkor Project also seeks to expose the activities of Holocaust deniers themselves. Based on the postings to the newsgroup over the years, it has compiled extensive writings from self-proclaimed revisionists, including David Irving, Ernst Zündel, Michael A. Hoffman II, and others. Among the various pieces of information stored at Nizkor is a sound recording of an answering machine message allegedly made by white supremacist Tom Metzger, encouraging various individuals to "take action" against "Zinkor [sic] on the Internet."

In 2009, the Simon Wiesenthal Center congratulated the Nizkor Project for having initiated an effort which led to the successful prosecution of three Nazi war criminals.

=== Criticisms ===
Holocaust denial web sites and spokespersons challenged McVay's neutrality and attacked him personally. The original Nizkor web site was accused by self-proclaimed "Holocaust revisionists" and neo-Nazi Web sites as being funded by Israel and other Zionist sources, though McVay consistently denied these charges. He stated that the Nizkor Project was funded solely by donations from the general public, as well as his own personal finances.

In the late 1990s, the Simon Wiesenthal Center criticized the Nizkor Project for increasing the visibility of hate groups and Holocaust deniers, even as it sought to debunk them. This debate between free speech advocates such as McVay and those who favor the suppression of speech with hate crime laws continued throughout the late 1990s, but has now mostly been resolved with the two sides agreeing on the common goal of confronting Holocaust deniers and keeping their disagreements over specific tactics private. In 1996, McVay spoke out against Internet hate crime laws in Canada in front of a committee of the Canadian parliament, stating that it is better to address the false claims of Holocaust deniers, rather than to censor them.
