= Rimland (surname) =

Rimland is a surname. Notable people with the surname include:

- Bernard Rimland (1928–2006), American psychologist, writer, and lecturer
- Ingrid Rimland (1936–2017), Ukrainian-born American writer
