= Did Six Million Really Die? =

Holocaust denial pamphlet

- Did Six Million Really Die? The Truth at Last by Richard Harwood (pseudonym of Richard Verrall)
- Author: Richard Verrall (as Richard E. Harwood)
- Subject: Holocaust denial
- Genre: Pamphlet, propaganda
- Publisher: Samisdat Publishers (Ernst Zündel)
- Publication date: 1974
- Subject of the landmark legal case R v Zundel

Did Six Million Really Die? The Truth at Last is a pamphlet that promotes Holocaust denial and other neo-Nazi sentiments, allegedly written by British National Front (NF) member Richard Verrall under the pseudonym Richard E. Harwood and published in 1974 by neo-Nazi propagandist Ernst Zündel, another Holocaust denier and pamphleteer. The NF denied that Verrall was the author in a 1978 edition of World in Action.

In 1983, Holocaust survivor Sabina Citron began a private prosecution under s.181 of the Canadian Criminal Code against Zündel, charging him with spreading false news. She was subsequently joined in her proceedings against Zündel by the government of Ontario. The Supreme Court concluded in the 1988 trial that "The pamphlet Did Six Million Really Die? does not fit with received views of reality because it is not part of reality."

== Claims ==
In the work, Verrall doubts the Holocaust death toll, opposing the historical consensus which says that "no less than six million Jews [were] exterminated" in concentration camps. The booklet targets various war crime trials, the best known of these being the Nuremberg trials and the Adolf Eichmann trial, criticising their legal integrity and the standards of evidence presented, as well as the impartiality and objectivity of the judges.

Verrall also attempts to demonstrate in the book that censuses and population charts show that the European Jewish population figures do not allow for a figure of six million Jews to have been murdered. He argues that the total Jewish population in Nazi-controlled Europe after emigrations and evacuations was "around three million".

He further argues that the scale of the Holocaust had been exaggerated by the Allies:

1. To hide their own guilt over such things as the atomic bombs dropped on Japanese cities, the air raids of predominantly civilian towns such as Dresden, and the Allies' own human-rights abuses
2. And as a pretext for the establishment of the state of Israel, which he predicates on the commission of atrocities against the Palestinian population.

Verrall's aim is to argue that the history of the 'six million' holocaust is used to discourage any form of nationalism and is a danger to the preservation of the Anglo-Saxon race: "No one could have anything but admiration for the way in which the Jews have sought to preserve their race through so many centuries, and continue to do so today. In this effort they have frankly been assisted by the story of the Six Million, which, almost like a religious myth, has stressed the need for greater Jewish racial solidarity. Unfortunately, it has worked in quite the opposite way for all other peoples, rendering them impotent in the struggle for self-preservation."

In discussing the Gerstein report, the pamphlet states that "Gerstein's sister was congenitally insane and died by euthanasia", effectively admitting the mass murder of civilians by the Nazis in the T4 program.

In writing his booklet, Verrall had used material published in the 1950s and 1960s and most of the inaccuracies of his booklet were errors originally made by Paul Rassinier whose works Verrall had used extensively.

== Supreme Court of Canada case ==
The booklet was examined by the Supreme Court of Canada in 1985 and 1988 in the prosecution of the publisher Zündel under the Criminal Code, section 181, of spreading false news. The 1985 conviction was overturned on appeal, leading to a second prosecution in 1988 which again resulted in a sentence of 15 months.

As part of Zündel's legal defence, Zündel hired Fred A. Leuchter to visit the Auschwitz and Majdanek concentration camps. At the trial, Leuchter was required to defend his report in his capacity as expert witness; however, he was dismissed because during the proceedings it became apparent that he had neither the qualifications nor experience to act as such. The 1988 trial judge concluded that the booklet "misrepresented the work of historians, misquoted witnesses, fabricated evidence, and cited non-existent authorities."

The Supreme Court did find that in the previous lower court trial, the jury were improperly instructed:

The jury was instructed that it was entitled to infer from the judge's instruction that because the Holocaust must be regarded as proven, the accused must have known it to be proven and must be taken to have published his pamphlet deliberately for personal motives, knowing the falsity of his assertion to the contrary. ... The verdict flowed inevitably from the indisputable fact of the publication of the pamphlet, its contents' divergence from the accepted history of the Holocaust, and the public interest in maintaining racial and religious tolerance.

However, in reviewing the proceedings of the lower court trial, the Supreme Court were convinced that the facts in the pamphlet were indeed false:

[During the previous trial] the appellant's allegations of fact in the pamphlet were divided into 85 extracts and rebutted one by one. The trial judge summarized this material at length for the jury but it will suffice here to point only to some of the more egregious examples. The pamphlet alleged that a memorandum from Joseph Goebbels revealed that the Final Solution was never more than a plan to evacuate Jews to Madagascar. It was shown that there was no such memorandum but that the reference was to Goebbels' diary entry of March 7, 1942. This diary extract was adduced and shown to state nothing of the kind. The Crown went on to point out that the entry for March 27, 1942 made clear that the Final Solution was, in fact, genocide: "Not much will remain of the Jews. On the whole, it can be said that about 60 per cent of them will have to be liquidated, whereas only about 40 per cent can be used for forced labor ..."

The pamphlet alleges that no documentary evidence exists of the Nazi plan to exterminate the Jews. The Crown adduced speeches by Heinrich Himmler, head of the SS, made on October 4, 1943, to his troops in Posen in which he refers to the program of extermination of the Jews. Himmler stated: "I also want to talk to you, quite frankly, on a very grave matter. Among ourselves it should be mentioned quite frankly, and yet we will never speak of it publicly. ... I mean the clearing out of the Jews, the extermination of the Jewish race ..."

The appellant argued that the term "exterminate" used in this passage really meant "deport". It was left to the jury to consider whether they accepted that this was a possible interpretation.

The Crown also adduced the December 9, 1942, entry in the diary of Hans Frank, Governor-General of occupied Poland's 'General Government' territory, describing the annihilation of 3.5 million Jews in the General Government and numerous documents adduced at the Nuremberg trials, including the daily reports of the Einsatzgruppen (action groups) enumerating the death tolls of Jews in the USSR. In a report to Hitler of December 20, 1942, Himmler indicates that the Einsatzgruppen had executed 363,211 Jews between August and November, 1942.

The pamphlet alleged, purportedly relying on a Red Cross report, that all concentration camps were really humane work camps. Mr. Biedermann, a delegate of the International Committee of the Red Cross, testified that the Red Cross Report pertained exclusively to prisoner of war camps as the Red Cross personnel had not been inside any camps in which civilians were detained. The Crown adduced evidence from Professor Hilberg that while some camps had labour facilities annexed to them, Belzec, Treblinka, Sobibor and Chelmno were exclusively "killing factories" and that gas chambers were in operation at Auschwitz-Birkenau and Majdanek. The numbers of Jews slaughtered was verifiable from railway records showing the payments per person made for transport to the camps. These numbers were compared with those having left the camps or who were found there after liberation.

On and on, the Crown showed that the appellant misrepresented the work of historians, misquoted witnesses, fabricated evidence, and cited non-existent authorities.

Ultimately the Supreme Court concluded:

The conflict between the assertions made by the appellant and those made by orthodox Holocaust historians cannot be resolved through reasoned debate. Orthodox historians point to sources which support their theories; the appellant and other "revisionist" historians point to documents which do not exist or which do not say what they claim they do. The pamphlet Did Six Million Really Die? does not fit with received views of reality because it is not part of reality.

=== Hugh Trevor-Roper ===
Although in the end he was not required to do so, the historian Hugh Trevor-Roper offered to give evidence, stating that "behind a simulated objectivity of expression, it is in fact an irresponsible and tendentious publication which avoids material evidence and presents selected half-truths and distortions for the sole purpose of sowing anti-Semitic propaganda".

== Royalties ==
Anthony Hancock re-published Did Six Million Really Die? and made a significant amount of money from doing so, to the point where he was sued for royalties in the Canadian High Court in 1982.

== International reactions ==
In 1975, South African authors Arthur Suzman and Denis Diamond published a book confronting the claims made by Verrall titled Six Million Did Die (Johannesburg). A second edition of the book was published in 1978. The first half of the book seeks to disprove claims made by Verrall and the second to provide further evidence of the Holocaust.

In the 1978 official bulletin, entitled "False Propaganda", the ICRC denounced Holocaust denial and confirmed that the agency "Never published—or even compiled—statistics of this kind which are being falsely attributed to it" and stated that its mission was "to help war victims, not to count them". Verrall also misused ICRC statistics to conclude that the number of people who died in Nazi prisons and camps from 1939 to 1945 was "300,000, not all of whom were Jews", but this was only in reference to "Germans and German Jews" and not nationals of other countries, later (and more complete) counts of the dead concord with estimates given by the International Tracing Service and other Holocaust researchers.

In 1985 and 1988, Verrall's publisher Ernst Zündel was tried in Canada on charges of "false news". He was found guilty and sentenced to 15 months in prison. On appeal his conviction was overturned by the Canadian Supreme Court's landmark decision R v Zundel, when it declared that the law under which he had been charged, reporting false news, was unconstitutional.

Did Six Million Really Die? was banned in Germany and South Africa.

In 2017, Amazon.com removed the book along with other Holocaust-denying books from its US and UK sites.
