= Richard Verrall =

British Holocaust denier (born 1948)

- Born: 1948 (age 77–78)
- Education: History
- Alma mater: Westfield College
- Spouse: Tessa Sempik
- Writing career
- Pen name: Richard E. Harwood
- Notable work: Did Six Million Really Die?
- Political party: NF
- Other political affiliations: Conservative Party
- Movement: Fascism

Richard Verrall (born 1948) is a British Holocaust denier and former deputy chairman of the British National Front (NF) who edited the magazine Spearhead from 1976 to 1980. Under the nom de plume of Richard E. Harwood, Verrall wrote the pamphlet Did Six Million Really Die?

== National Front involvement ==
Verrall studied history at Westfield College, now part of Queen Mary University of London, obtaining a first class honours degree. Initially a member of the Conservative Party, Verrall left in the early 1970s, along with a number of members on the right who supported Enoch Powell, to join the NF. Initially a close supporter of John Tyndall, he was appointed Spearhead editor by Tyndall and used the magazine to deny the Holocaust. He was also known for his endorsement of eugenics and biological determinism, adding to this theory that it was equally natural for members of a genetic group to sacrifice themselves for the benefit of others of the same group, thus attacking the criticism that the notion of sacrifice makes this theory inapplicable to humanity.

Despite his initial support for Tyndall, Verrall did not follow him into the New National Front and indeed was appointed deputy chairman of the NF by Andrew Brons in 1980. In 1985, he testified before a British court that he was disassociated from the NF, testimony that was corroborated by that of his Canadian publisher in a separate trial held in Ontario.

== Holocaust denial career ==
Verrall is best known for his pamphlet (under the pseudonym Richard Harwood), Did Six Million Really Die?, a Holocaust denial pamphlet which was the subject of criminal action against its Canadian-based German publisher, Ernst Zündel. The Supreme Court of Canada found the pamphlet contained fabrications and distortions, noting it "misrepresented the work of historians, misquoted witnesses, fabricated evidence, and cited non-existent authorities".

In 2017, Amazon in the UK removed the pamphlet from its site.

== Personal life ==
Verrall married Tessa Sempik, a British solicitor. They were mentioned in a 1996 article about tenancy law.
