= The Wanderers (Rimland novel) =

1977 novel about Ukrainian Mennonites

- First edition
- Author: Ingrid Rimland
- Language: English
- Genre: Novel
- Publisher: Concordia
- Publication date: 1977
- Publication place: United States
- Media type: Print (hardback & paperback)
- Pages: 323 (hardcover)
- ISBN: 0-570-03266-0

The Wanderers is a novel by Ingrid Rimland published in 1977 loosely based upon her own experiences from growing up in a Mennonite community in Ukraine. Rimland wanted to write a novel about her people, and The Wanderers tells the story of the plight of Mennonite women caught in the social upheavals of revolution and war. The novel traces the decimation of a pacifist people during the Russian Revolution, anarchy, famine, the Stalinist purges, escape from Ukraine, and eventual resettlement in the rain forests of Paraguay.

The novel remains Rimland's most acclaimed book. It earned her the California Literature Medal Award for best fiction in 1977.
