= R v Zundel =

Free speech case in Supreme Court of Canada

- Supreme Court of Canada

Hearing: December 10, 1991 Judgment: August 27, 1992
- Full case name: Ernst Zundel v Her Majesty The Queen
- Citations: [1992] 2 S.C.R. 731
- Docket No.: 21811
- Prior history: R. v. Zundel, 1990 CanLII 11025 (ON CA); R. v. Zundel, 1988 CarswellOnt 2425, [1988] O.J. No. 4657, 7 W.C.B. (2d) 26; R. v. Zundel, 1987 CanLII 121 (ON CA)
- Ruling: Zundel appeal allowed

Court membership
- Chief Justice: Antonio Lamer; Puisne Justices: Gérard La Forest, Claire L'Heureux-Dubé, John Sopinka, Charles Gonthier, Peter Cory, Beverley McLachlin, William Stevenson, Frank Iacobucci

Reasons given
- Majority: McLachlin; La Forest, L'Heureux-Dubé and Sopinka concurring
- Dissent: Cory and Iacobucci; Gonthier concurring
- Lamer and Stevenson took no part in the consideration or decision of the case.

R v Zundel [1992] 2 S.C.R. 731 is a Supreme Court of Canada decision where the Court struck down the provision in the Criminal Code that prohibited publication of false news on the basis that it violated the freedom of expression provision under section 2(b) of the Canadian Charter of Rights and Freedoms.

In 1985, German-born Ernst Zündel was charged with "spreading false news" under the Criminal Code. Initially, Zündel was found guilty, but this conviction was overturned in the Court of Appeal for Ontario, and a re-trial ordered. However, during his second trial, Zündel was once again found guilty and sentenced to nine months in prison. At the Court of Appeal, Zündel's conviction was upheld. When Zündel's case reached the Supreme Court of Canada, his conviction was overturned.

In a 4–3 decision, the Supreme Court of Canada found section 181 of the Criminal Code violated section 2(b) of the Charter, infringing on Zündel's rights. The Court declared section 181 inoperative, and Zündel's conviction was quashed.

== Background ==
The German-born Ernst Zündel (1939–2017) immigrated to Toronto in 1958 where he became associated with antisemitic groups and read extensively on antisemitic ideologies. In the 1970s, he established Samisdat Books, a publishing house, right in his Toronto residence, with the intent to disseminate Holocaust denial literature worldwide.

The Canadian Holocaust Remembrance Association brought forward a private prosecution against Zundel, which was suggested to the organization by former Crown attorney Robert McGee. Prior to this point the Ontario government and Attorney General of Ontario Roy McMurtry were hesitant to bring charges under section 281 of the Criminal Code for hate-literature as it was felt such a case was unwinnable.

In 1985 the Crown took over the case and Zündel was charged with "spreading false news" by publishing the pamphlet Did Six Million Really Die? (1974) in Canada, contrary to Section 181 of the Criminal Code. This section states that "[e]very one who wilfully publishes a statement, tale or news that he knows is false and causes or is likely to cause injury or mischief to a public interest is guilty of an indictable offence and liable to imprisonment".

=== First trial ===
Zündel was initially found guilty at trial before Justice Hugh Russell Locke and subsequently sentenced to fifteen months of imprisonment and three years of probation. As part of the probation, Zündel was not permitted to publish any material pertaining to the Holocaust. Throughout the trial, Zündel's defence rested on his honest belief of the truth of the pamphlet.

Zündel filed an appeal, and on January 23, 1987, a unanimous decision of the Court of Appeal for Ontario overturned the decision and ordered a new trial. The panel composed of Chief Justice of Ontario William Goldwin Carrington Howland, and Justices John Watson Brooke, G. Arthur Martin, Maurice Norbert Lacourcière, and Lloyd William Houlden, ordered a new trial because of errors in the conduct of the trial, particularly regarding jury selection and misdirection on elements of the offence. The Court of Appeal also considered the constitutionality of section 181 of the Criminal Code and found it did not violate section 2(b) Charter rights, and even if it did, the provision would be justified under section 1 of the Charter.

=== Second trial ===
On May 13, 1988, Zündel was convicted in the subsequent trial, and was sentenced to nine months in prison. District Court Judge Thomas noted that his sentence was less severe than the sentence in the first trial, as he could not find evidence that Zündel was able to have a "significant part of the community react to his beliefs". On February 5, 1990, a panel of the Court of Appeal composed of Justices John Watson Brooke, John Wilson Morden, and Patrick Thomas Galligan unanimously upheld both the judgment and the sentence. In response, Zündel pursued an appeal to the Supreme Court.

The issue before the Supreme Court was whether section 181 (formerly section 177) of the Code infringed "the guarantee of freedom of expression in section 2(b) of the Canadian Charter of Rights and Freedoms and, if so, whether section 181 is justifiable under section 1 of the Charter".

== Supreme Court of Canada ==
Zündel appealed the decision of the Court of Appeal for Ontario to the Supreme Court of Canada, which heard the case on December 10, 1991. On August 27, 1992, Justice Beverley McLachlin authored the majority ecision representing four justices, while Justices Peter Cory and Frank Iacobucci wrote the dissenting reasons. The Court concluded that section 181 of the Criminal Code, which prohibited the dissemination of false news was unconstitutional because it encroached upon the right to freedom of expression provided in section 2(b) of the Charter. Furthermore, the Court ruled that this infringement was not justified under section 1 of the Charter. Consequently, Zündel's appeal was successful, and his conviction was overturned.

=== Majority decision ===
Justice Beverley McLachlin, writing for a narrow majority of the Court, concluded that Zündel had indeed violated section 181. The Court thoroughly examined the book in question and determined that it "misrepresented the work of historians, misquoted witnesses, fabricated evidence, and cited non-existent authorities".

When assessing section 181 against the backdrop of section 2(b) of the Charter, the court applied the test established in Irwin Toy Ltd v Quebec (AG). The Court found section 181 met both elements of this test. In the first element of the test, the Court observed that all form of speech is protected unless it is violent, a criterion which Zündel's speech did not meet. The second element of the test, the Court acknowledged that government action aimed at curbing such expression was undeniably present, given that section 181 sought to suppress this type of speech.

In the context of determining whether section 181 could be justified under section 1 of the Charter, the Court found there was no evidence to the purpose or objective underlying section 181. The Court also rejected the Crown's assertion of a "shifting purpose" of the provision towards promoting "social harmony". In Justice McLachlin's perspective, the Court "cannot assign objectives, nor invent new ones according to the perceived current utility of the impugned provision". Furthermore, Justice McLachlin asserted that section 181 could not be justified under section 1 of the Charter, as the restriction on all expressions "likely to cause injury or mischief to a public interest" was far too broad. Consequently, the ultimate outcome of the Court's decision was that section 181 was struck down and rendered null and void.

=== Dissenting reasons ===
The dissenting reasons noted that section 2(b) safeguards all forms of non-violent expression, rendering the content itself irrelevant (section 2(b) is content neutral). The dissenting justices employed section 15 (equal protection) and section 27 (enhancement of multicultural heritage) of the Charter as support to the objective of section 181 of the Criminal Code. The objective of section 181 was deemed the promotion of "social harmony", and therefore met the "rational connection" element of the proportionality test. The dissent also found that section 181 had minimal impairment on freedom of expression as the Crown was required to prove the accused willfully published false materials, and the statement was likely to cause injury to the public interest.

== Aftermath ==
Section 181 of the Criminal Code was struck down, but remained in the statute. On June 21, 2019, the provision was repealed from the Criminal Code in An Act to amend the Criminal Code, the Youth Criminal Justice Act and other Acts and to make consequential amendments to other Acts after being passed by the 42nd Canadian Parliament.
