= Kenneth McVay =

American activist

Kenneth Neal McVay October 2, 1940 December 15, 2024 (aged 84) OBC
- Born: San Jose, California
- Occupation: Activist

Kenneth "Ken" McVay (born October 2, 1940), a Canadian-American dual citizen, was an Internet activist against Holocaust denial. He was the founder of the Nizkor Project, one of the first websites against Holocaust denial.

An active participant on the newsgroup alt.revisionism, McVay describes himself as a person who found himself moved to action by the efforts of Holocaust deniers on the newsgroup to promote "evidence" that he found to be poorly presented and claims that were vague at best. He also opposed the idea of censoring and suppressing the deniers, as authorities and experts on hate groups often did.

A former active-duty United States Marine and retired service station manager, McVay found that he had an ample amount of spare time to dedicate to researching and transcribing historical documents, so that they could be made available online to counter the arguments of the deniers. In various interviews, he has stated his belief that of the many reasons for the deniers to oppose him and despise him, one of the most frustrating to them is the fact that their arguments have been so thoroughly debunked by a man who is not Jewish and has never professed to be a world-class scholar.

McVay's efforts in combatting Holocaust denial with speech and documentation instead of censorship won him praise among many activists, and in 1995 he was awarded the Order of British Columbia by the Province of British Columbia.
