= Ingrid Rimland =

American novelist (1936–2017)

- Born: May 22, 1936; Molochansk, Dnipropetrovsk Oblast, Ukrainian SSR, USSR
- Died: October 12, 2017 (aged 81); Tennessee, U.S.
- Occupations: Author and child psychologist
- Spouse(s): Ernst Zündel (2001–2017, his death)
- Writing career
- Notable work: The Wanderers
- Website: soaringeaglesgallery.com

Ingrid A. Rimland, also known as Ingrid Zündel (May 22, 1936 – October 12, 2017), was an American writer. She wrote several novels based upon her own experiences growing up in a Mennonite community in Ukraine and as a refugee child during World War II. Her novel The Wanderers (1977), which won her the California Literature Medal Award for best fiction, tells the story of the plight of Mennonite women caught in the social upheavals of revolution and war. In the 1990s, she became a prominent collaborator of Neo-Nazi and Holocaust denier Ernst Zündel, whom she married in 2001. Rimland died on October 12, 2017.

== Biography ==
Born into a Russian-German Mennonite community in Ukraine she grew up trilingual (German, Russian and Ukrainian) in the Soviet Union. Her family had been wealthy prior to the Russian revolution, but the community faced persecution under the communist regime due to their pacifist beliefs and heritage. In 1941, when she was five years old, her father was deported to Siberia. Fleeing the Red Army, she ended up in Germany with her mother in 1945.

In Paraguay, she married and had one son. The family immigrated to Canada in 1960, settling in St. Catharines, Ontario, where their second son was born, and then to the United States in 1967, where she eventually became a US citizen. In 1971, she graduated from Wichita State University with a bachelor's degree. She earned a Master's and then, in 1979, a doctorate of education (Ed.D) from the University of the Pacific, California.

== Literary works ==
Most of her literary work is autobiographical to various extents. Her 1977 novel The Wanderers traces the decimation of the pacifist Russian Mennonite community during the Russian Revolution, anarchy, famine, the Stalinist purges, escape from Ukraine, and eventual resettlement in the rain forests of Paraguay. Her 1984 book, The Furies and the Flame, is her autobiography as an immigrant and deals with her struggle to raise her handicapped child.

In her third book, Demon Doctor, Rimland recounts her quest to find Nazi war criminal Josef Mengele in the 1980s with the help of Simon Wiesenthal. She had believed that Mengele worked as a doctor in her Paraguayan Mennonite community of Volendam, but was unable to prove this.

Her trilogy Lebensraum was written after she began to deny the Holocaust in the 1990s and is "permeated with anti-Semitism."

== Relationship with Ernst Zündel ==
In September 1994, Rimland first met German-born Holocaust denier Ernst Zündel, who was then a resident in Canada, at the twelfth International Revisionist Conference held by the Institute for Historical Review, a Holocaust denial organization. Interviewed by Zündel on his television programs at the time, she said Adolf Hitler “brought into our colonies the values that we had always held dear, namely the family cohesion, the pride in race, which was part of my upbringing.” She founded his website Zundelsite.org from her home in California. Zündel became her second husband in 2001 and the couple moved to Tennessee. Around 2011, Rimland produced the film Off Your Knees, Germany! which was about Zündel's two trials in Canada for deliberately publishing fake news about the Holocaust, for which he was ultimately imprisoned and deported.

When Zündel died in August 2017, The New York Times contacted Rimland: "whoever calls will get the same answer from me: I will give no comment because the mainstream media is too biased". Aside from an announcement of her own death and an undated picture of the then-alive couple, Rimland's former website is now defunct.

== See also ==
- Anabaptist–Jewish relations
