= Holocaust denial =

Denial of the Holocaust

Holocaust denial is the negationist and antisemitic fringe claim that Nazi Germany and its collaborators did not commit genocide against European Jews during World War II, ignoring overwhelming historical evidence to the contrary. Deniers assert that the Holocaust is a fabrication or exaggeration, making one or more of the following false claims: that Nazi Germany's "Final Solution" was aimed only at deporting Jews from the Third Reich and did not include their extermination; that Nazi authorities did not use extermination camps and gas chambers for the mass murder of Jews; that the actual number of Jews murdered is significantly lower than the accepted figure of approximately six million; and that the Holocaust is a hoax perpetrated by the Allies, Jews, or the Soviet Union.

Holocaust denial has roots in postwar Europe, beginning with writers such as Maurice Bardèche and Paul Rassinier. In the United States, the Institute for Historical Review gave Holocaust denial a pseudo-scholarly platform and helped spread it globally. In the Islamic world, Holocaust denial has been used to delegitimize Israel; deniers portray the Holocaust as a fabrication to justify the creation of a Jewish state. Iran is the leading state sponsor, embedding Holocaust denial into its official ideology through state-backed conferences and cartoon contests. In former Eastern Bloc countries, deniers do not deny the mass murder of Jews but deny the participation of their own nationals.

The methodologies of Holocaust deniers are based on a predetermined conclusion that ignores historical evidence. Scholars use the term denial to describe the views and methodology of Holocaust deniers in order to distinguish them from legitimate historical revisionists, who challenge orthodox interpretations of history using established historical methodologies. Holocaust deniers generally do not accept denial as an appropriate description of their activities and use the euphemism revisionism instead. Holocaust denial is considered a serious societal problem in many places where it occurs. It is illegal in Canada, Israel, and many European countries, including Germany itself. In 2007 and 2022, the United Nations General Assembly adopted resolutions condemning Holocaust denial.

== Terminology and etymology ==
Holocaust deniers prefer to refer to their work as historical revisionism, and object to being referred to as "deniers". Emory University professor Deborah Lipstadt has written that: "The deniers' selection of the name revisionist to describe themselves is indicative of their basic strategy of deceit and distortion and of their attempt to portray themselves as legitimate historians engaged in the traditional practice of illuminating the past." Scholars consider this misleading since the methods of Holocaust denial differ from those of legitimate historical revision. Legitimate historical revisionism is explained in a resolution adopted by the Duke University History Department, November 8, 1991, and reprinted in Duke Chronicle, November 13, 1991, in response to an advertisement produced by Bradley R. Smith's Committee for Open Debate on the Holocaust:

That historians are constantly engaged in historical revision is certainly correct; however, what historians do is very different from this advertisement. Historical revision of major events ... is not concerned with the actuality of these events; rather, it concerns their historical interpretation – their causes and consequences generally.

Lipstadt writes that modern Holocaust denial draws its inspiration from various sources, including a school of thought which used an established method to question government policies.

In 1992, Donald L. Niewyk gave some examples of how legitimate historical revisionism—the re-examination of accepted history and its updating with newly discovered, more accurate, or less-biased information—may be applied to the study of the Holocaust as new facts emerge to change the historical understanding of it:

With the main features of the Holocaust clearly visible to all but the willfully blind, historians have turned their attention to aspects of the story for which the evidence is incomplete or ambiguous. These are not minor matters by any means, but turn on such issues as Hitler's role in the event, Jewish responses to persecution, and reactions by onlookers both inside and outside Nazi-controlled Europe.

In contrast, the Holocaust denial movement bases its approach on the predetermined idea that the Holocaust, as understood by mainstream historiography, did not occur. Sometimes referred to as "negationism", from the French term négationnisme introduced by Henry Rousso, Holocaust deniers attempt to rewrite history by minimizing, denying, or simply ignoring essential facts. Koenraad Elst writes:

Negationism means the denial of historical crimes against humanity. It is not a reinterpretation of known facts, but the denial of known facts. The term negationism has gained currency as the name of a movement to deny a specific crime against humanity, the Nazi genocide on the Jews in 1941–45, also known as the Holocaust (Greek: complete burning) or the Shoah (Hebrew: disaster). Negationism is mostly identified with the effort at re-writing history in such a way that the fact of the Holocaust is omitted.

In "Secondary Anti-Semitism: From Hard-Core to Soft-Core Denial of the Shoah", political scientist Clemens Heni writes:

Contrary to the hard-core version, soft-core denial is often not easily identifiable. Often it is tolerated, or even encouraged and reproduced in the mainstream, not only in Germany. Scholars have only recently begun to unravel this disturbing phenomenon. Manfred Gerstenfeld discusses Holocaust trivialization in an article published in 2008. In Germany in 2007 two scholars, Thorsten Eitz and Georg Stötzel, published a voluminous dictionary of German language and discourse regarding National Socialism and the Holocaust. It includes chapters on Holocaust trivialization and contrived comparisons, such as the infamous "atomic Holocaust", "Babycaust", "Holocaust of abortion", "red Holocaust" or "biological Holocaust".

== Causes ==
There are a wide variety of motivations for denying the Holocaust, which can include antisemitism, German nationalism, and sympathy for National Socialism. Enzo Traverso argues that instrumentalization of the Holocaust could lead to Holocaust denial: "many will come to believe that the Holocaust is a myth invented to defend the interests of Israel and its allies".

Although some have argued that Holocaust denial is rising over time, other evidence indicates that it remains a fringe belief.

== Background ==
=== Denial as a means of genocide ===
Lawrence Douglas argues that denial was invented by the perpetrators and employed as a means of genocide. For example, trucks of Zyklon B were labeled with Red Cross symbols and victims were told that they would be "resettled". Douglas also cites the Posen speeches as an example of denial while genocide was ongoing, with Himmler referring to the Holocaust as "an unnamed and never to be named page of glory". According to Douglas, the denial of mass murder using gas chambers recalls the Nazi efforts to persuade the victims that they were actually harmless showers.

=== Efforts to conceal the historical record ===
==== German efforts ====
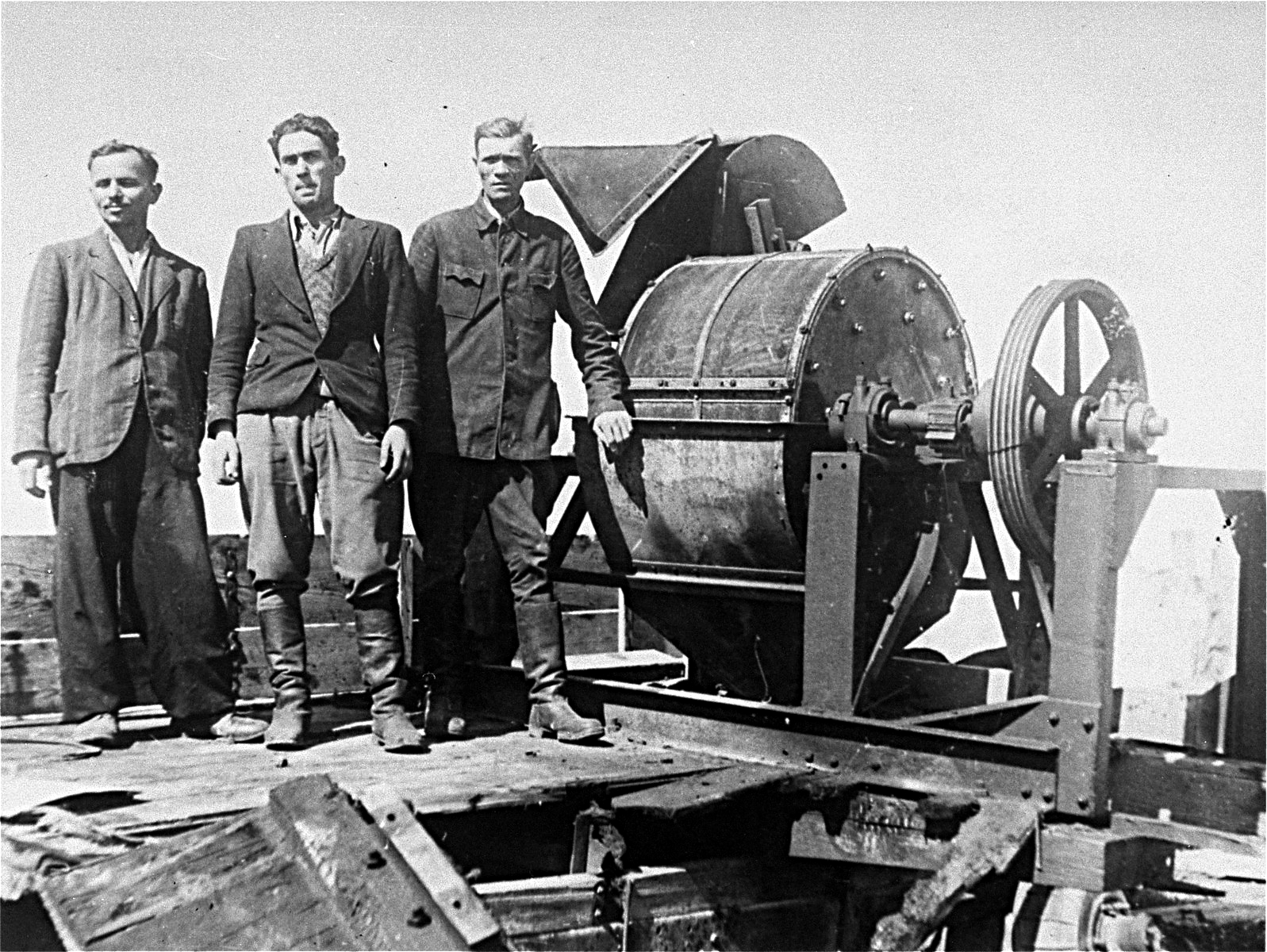
Members of a Sonderkommando 1005 unit pose next to a bone-crushing machine in the Janowska concentration camp (photo taken in August 1944, after camp's liberation).

While the Second World War was still underway, the Nazis had already formed a contingency plan that if defeat was imminent they would carry out the total destruction of German records. Historians have documented evidence that as Germany's defeat became imminent and Nazi leaders realized they would most likely be captured and brought to trial, great effort was made to destroy all evidence of mass extermination. Heinrich Himmler instructed his camp commandants to destroy records, crematoria, and other signs of mass extermination. As one of many examples, the bodies of the 25,000 mostly Latvian Jews whom Friedrich Jeckeln and the soldiers under his command had shot at Rumbula (near Riga) in late 1941 were dug up and burned in 1943. Similar operations were undertaken at Belzec, Treblinka and other death camps.

==== French collaboration in archive destruction ====
In occupied France, the situation with respect to preserving war records was not much better, partly as a result of French state secrecy rules dating back to well before the war aimed at protecting the French government and the state from embarrassing revelations, and partly to avoid culpability. For example, at Liberation, the Prefecture of Police destroyed nearly all of the massive archive of Jewish arrest and deportation.

=== Efforts to preserve the historical record ===
==== During the war ====
One of the earliest efforts to save historical record of the Holocaust occurred during the war in France, where Drancy internment camp records were carefully preserved and turned over to the new National Office for Veterans and Victims of War. However, the bureau then held them in secret, refusing to release copies later, including to the Center of Contemporary Jewish Documentation (CDJC).

In 1943, Isaac Schneersohn, anticipating the need for a center to document and preserve the memory of the persecution for historical reasons and also support claims post-war, gathered together 40 representatives from Jewish organizations in Grenoble which was under Italian occupation at the time in order to form a center de documentation. Exposure meant the death penalty, and as a result little actually happened before liberation. Serious work began after the center moved to Paris in late 1944 and was renamed the CDJC.

==== Immediate post-war period ====
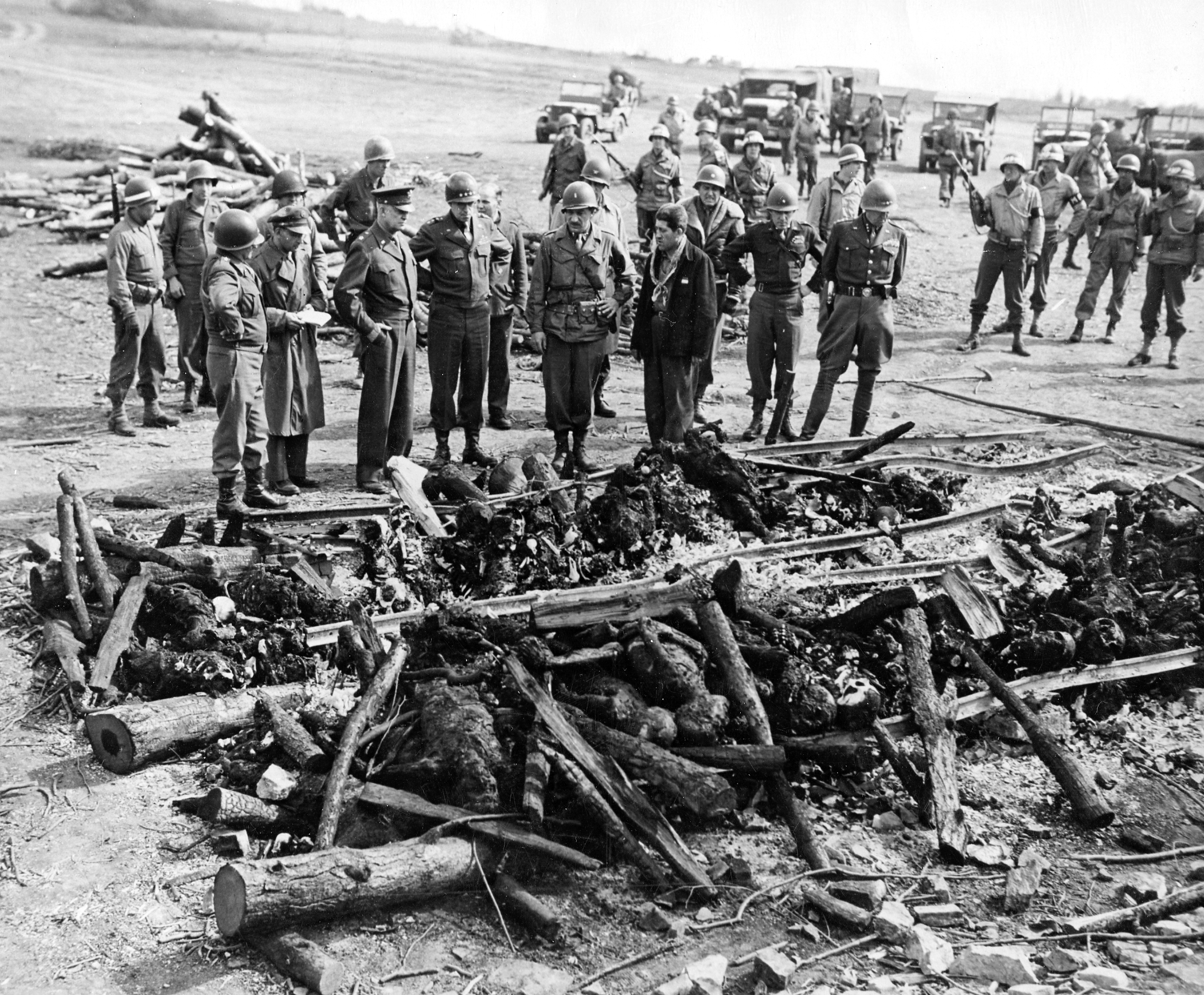
April 12, 1945: Generals Dwight D. Eisenhower, Omar Bradley and George S. Patton inspect an improvised crematory pyre at Ohrdruf concentration camp.

In 1945, General Dwight D. Eisenhower, Supreme Allied Commander, anticipated that someday an attempt would be made to recharacterize the documentation of Nazi crimes as propaganda and took steps against it. Eisenhower, upon finding the victims of Nazi concentration camps, ordered all possible photographs to be taken, and for the German people from surrounding villages to be ushered through the camps and made to bury the dead.

==== Nuremberg trials ====
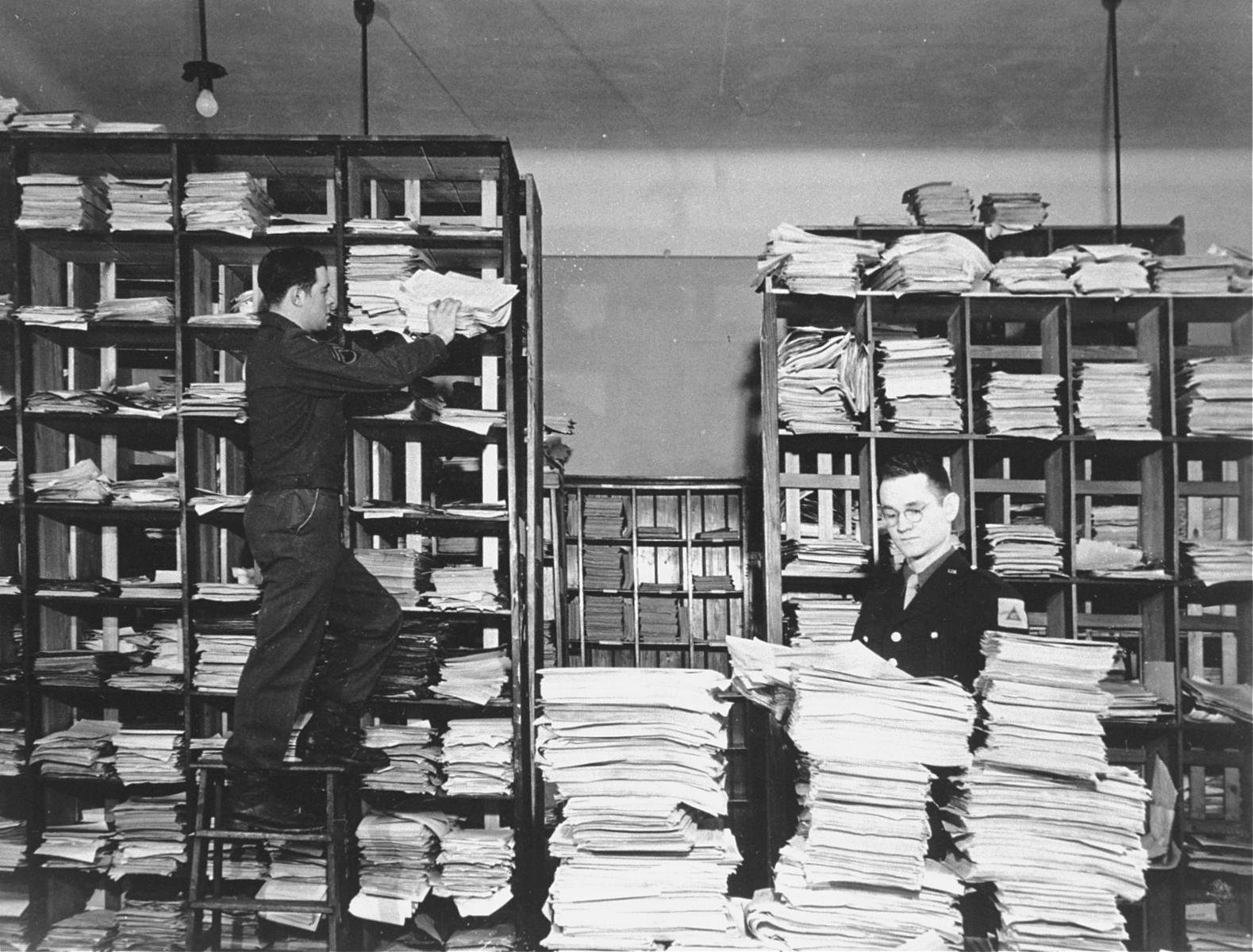
United States Army clerks with evidence collected for the Nuremberg trials

The Nuremberg trials took place in Germany after the war in 1945–1946. The stated aim was to dispense justice in retribution for atrocities of the German government. This Allied intention to administer justice post-war was first announced in 1943 in the Declaration on German Atrocities in Occupied Europe and reiterated at the Yalta Conference and at Berlin in 1945. While the intention was not specifically to preserve the historical record of the Holocaust, some of the core documents required to prosecute the cases were provided to them by the CDJC, and much of the huge trove of archives were then transferred to the CDJC after the trials and became the core of future Holocaust historiography.

The Nuremberg trials were important historically, but the events were still very recent, television was in its infancy and not present, and there was little public impact. There were isolated moments of limited public awareness from Hollywood films such as The Diary of Anne Frank (1959) or the 1961 Judgment at Nuremberg which had some newsreel footage of actual scenes from liberated Nazi concentration camps including scenes of piles of naked corpses laid out in rows and bulldozed into large pits, which was considered exceptionally graphic for the time.

Public awareness changed when the Eichmann trial riveted the world's attention fifteen years after Nuremberg.

==== Trial of Adolf Eichmann ====
In 1961, the Israeli government captured Adolf Eichmann in Argentina and brought him to Israel to stand trial for war crimes. Chief prosecutor Gideon Hausner's intentions were not only to demonstrate Eichmann's guilt personally but to present material about the entire Holocaust, thus producing a comprehensive record.

The Israeli government arranged for the trial to have prominent media coverage. Many major newspapers from all over the globe sent reporters and published front-page coverage of the story. Israelis had the opportunity to watch live television broadcasts of the proceedings, and videotape was flown daily to the United States for broadcast the following day.

== Key proponents and organizations ==
In the immediate aftermath of the war, before the Allied forces had fully documented the extent of the Holocaust, many people reacted with disbelief and even denied the first reports of what had happened. Compounding this disbelief was the memory of forged newspaper accounts of the German Corpse Factory, an anti-German atrocity propaganda campaign during WWI, which was widely known to be false by 1945.

During the 1930s, the Nazi government used this propaganda against the British, claiming allegations of concentration camps were malicious lies put forward by the British government, and historians Joachim Neander and Randal Marlin note that this story "encouraged later disbelief when early reports circulated about the Holocaust under Hitler". Victor Cavendish-Bentinck, chairman of the British Joint Intelligence Committee, noted that these reports were similar to "stories of employment of human corpses during the last war for the manufacture of fat which was a grotesque lie"; likewise, The Christian Century commented that "The parallel between this story and the 'corpse factory' atrocity tale of the First World War is too striking to be overlooked." Neander notes that "There can be no doubt that the reported commercial use of the corpses of the murdered Jews undermined the credibility of the news coming from Poland and delayed action that might have rescued many Jewish lives."

The Neo-Nazi movement has been revitalized by Holocaust denial. Small but vocal numbers of neo-Nazis realized that recreation of a Hitlerite-style regime may be impossible, but a replica might be produced in the future; the rehabilitation of Nazism, they concluded, required the discrediting of the Holocaust. Neo-fascism has likewise relied upon Holocaust denial as a means of rehabilitation.

As a movement, modern Holocaust denial is associated with historical revisionism based on pseudoscientific evidence and fringe academic networks including intradiegetic pseudoscientific journals, conferences, and professional organizations (e.g. Journal of Historical Review, International Conference to Review the Global Vision of the Holocaust, Committee for Open Debate on the Holocaust).

=== Maurice Bardèche ===
The first person to openly write after the end of World War II that he doubted the reality of the Holocaust was French art critic Maurice Bardèche in his 1948 book Nuremberg ou la Terre promise ("Nuremberg or the Promised Land"). In the 1950 book Nuremberg II, ou les Faux-Monnayeurs, designed around the tale of Paul Rassinier, a former deportee from Nazi concentration camps (not to be confused with extermination camps) turned into a Holocaust denier, Bardèche concluded that kapos were in reality worse than SS, and expressed his "doubts" about the existence of gas chambers.

Viewed as "the father-figure of Holocaust denial", Bardèche introduced in his works many aspects of neo-fascist and Holocaust denial propaganda techniques and ideological structures; his work is deemed influential in regenerating post-war European far-right ideas at a time of identity crisis in the 1950–1960s. His arguments formed the basis of numerous works of Holocaust denial that followed: "testimonies are not reliable, essentially coming from the mouth of Jews and communists", "atrocities committed in camps were the work of deportees [essentially the kapos]", "disorganization occurred in Nazi camps following the first German defeats", "the high mortality is due to the 'weakening' of prisoners and epidemics", "only lice were gassed in Auschwitz", etc.

=== Harry Elmer Barnes ===
Harry Elmer Barnes, at one time a mainstream American historian, assumed a Holocaust-denial stance in his later years. Between World War I and World War II, Barnes was an anti-war writer and a leader of the historical revisionism movement. Starting in 1924, Barnes worked closely with the Centre for the Study of the Causes of the War, a German government-funded think tank whose sole purpose was to disseminate the official government position that Germany was the victim of Allied aggression in 1914 and that the Versailles Treaty was morally invalid. Headed by Major Alfred von Wegerer, a völkisch activist, the organization portrayed itself as a scholarly society, but historians later described it as "a clearinghouse for officially desirable views on the outbreak of the war."

Following World War II, Barnes became convinced that allegations made against Germany and Japan, including the Holocaust, were wartime propaganda that had been used to justify the United States' involvement in World War II. Barnes claimed that there were two false claims made about World War II, namely that Germany started the war in 1939, and the Holocaust, which Barnes claimed did not happen.

In his 1962 pamphlet, Revisionism and Brainwashing, Barnes claimed that there was a "lack of any serious opposition or concerted challenge to the atrocity stories and other modes of defamation of German national character and conduct". Barnes argued that there was "a failure to point out the atrocities of the Allies were more brutal, painful, mortal and numerous than the most extreme allegations made against the Germans". He claimed that in order to justify the "horrors and evils of the Second World War", the Allies made the Nazis the "scapegoat" for their own misdeeds.

Barnes cited the French Holocaust denier Paul Rassinier, whom Barnes called a "distinguished French historian" who had exposed the "exaggerations of the atrocity stories". In a 1964 article, "Zionist Fraud", published in The American Mercury, Barnes wrote: "The courageous author [Rassinier] lays the chief blame for misrepresentation on those whom we must call the swindlers of the crematoria, the Israeli politicians who derive billions of marks from nonexistent, mythical and imaginary cadavers, whose numbers have been reckoned in an unusually distorted and dishonest manner." Using Rassinier as his source, Barnes claimed that Germany was the victim of aggression in both 1914 and 1939 and that reports of the Holocaust were propaganda to justify a war of aggression against Germany.

=== Beginnings of modern denialism ===
In 1961, a protégé of Barnes, David L. Hoggan, published Der erzwungene Krieg (The Forced War) in West Germany, which claimed that Germany had been the victim of an Anglo-Polish conspiracy in 1939. Though Der erzwungene Krieg was primarily concerned with the origins of World War II, it also down-played or justified the effects of Nazi antisemitic measures in the pre-1939 period. For example, Hoggan justified the huge one billion Reichsmark fine imposed on the entire Jewish community in Germany after the 1938 Kristallnacht as a reasonable measure to prevent what he called "Jewish profiteering" at the expense of German insurance companies and alleged that no Jews were killed in the Kristallnacht (in fact, 91 German Jews were murdered in the Kristallnacht). Subsequently, Hoggan explicitly denied the Holocaust in 1969 in a book entitled The Myth of the Six Million, which was published by the Noontide Press, a small Los Angeles publisher specializing in antisemitic literature.

In 1964, Paul Rassinier published The Drama of the European Jews. Rassinier was himself a concentration camp survivor (he was held in Buchenwald for having helped French Jews escape the Nazis), and modern-day deniers continue to cite his works as scholarly research that questions the accepted facts of the Holocaust. Critics argued that Rassinier did not cite evidence for his claims and ignored information that contradicted his assertions; he nevertheless remains influential in Holocaust denial circles for being one of the first deniers to propose that a vast Zionist/Allied/Soviet conspiracy faked the Holocaust, a theme that would be picked up in later years by other authors.

Austin App, a La Salle University medieval English literature professor, is considered the first major mainstream American holocaust denier. App defended the Germans and Nazi Germany during World War II. He published numerous articles, letters, and books on Holocaust denial, quickly building a loyal following. App's work inspired the Institute for Historical Review, a California center founded in 1978 whose sole task is the denial of the Holocaust.

The publication of Arthur Butz's The Hoax of the Twentieth Century: The case against the presumed extermination of European Jewry in 1976 brought other similarly inclined individuals into the fold. Butz was a tenured associate professor of electrical engineering at Northwestern University. In December 1978 and January 1979, Robert Faurisson, a French professor of literature at the University of Lyon, wrote two letters to Le Monde claiming that the gas chambers used by the Nazis to exterminate the Jews did not exist. A colleague of Faurisson, Jean-Claude Pressac, who initially shared Faurisson's views, later became convinced of the Holocaust's evidence while investigating documents at Auschwitz in 1979. He published his conclusions along with much of the underlying evidence in his 1989 book, Auschwitz: Technique and operation of the gas chambers.

Henry Bienen, the former president of Northwestern University, has described Arthur Butz's view of the Holocaust as an "embarrassment to Northwestern". In 2006, sixty of Butz's colleagues from the Department of Electrical Engineering and Computer Science faculty signed a censure describing Butz's Holocaust denial as "an affront to our humanity and our standards as scholars". The letter also called for Butz to "leave our Department and our University and stop trading on our reputation for academic excellence".

=== Institute for Historical Review ===
In 1978, the American far-right activist Willis Carto founded the Institute for Historical Review (IHR), an organization dedicated to publicly challenging the commonly accepted history of the Holocaust. The IHR's founding was inspired by Austin App, a La Salle professor of medieval English literature and considered the first major American holocaust denier. The IHR sought from the beginning to establish itself within the broad tradition of historical revisionism, by soliciting token supporters who were not from a neo-Nazi background such as James J. Martin and Samuel Edward Konkin III, and by promoting the writings of French socialist Paul Rassinier and American anti-war historian Harry Elmer Barnes, in an attempt to show that Holocaust denial had a base of support beyond neo-Nazis. The IHR republished most of Barnes's writings, which had been out of print since his death. While it included articles on other topics and sold books by mainstream historians, the majority of material published and distributed by IHR was devoted to questioning the facts surrounding the Holocaust.

In 1980, the IHR promised a $50,000 reward to anyone who could prove that Jews were gassed at Auschwitz. Mel Mermelstein wrote a letter to the editors of the Los Angeles Times and others including The Jerusalem Post. The IHR wrote back, offering him $50,000 for proof that Jews were, in fact, gassed in the gas chambers at Auschwitz. Mermelstein, in turn, submitted a notarized account of his internment at Auschwitz and how he witnessed Nazi guards ushering his mother and two sisters and others towards (as he learned later) gas chamber number five. Despite this, the IHR refused to pay the reward. Represented by public interest attorney William John Cox, Mermelstein subsequently sued the IHR in the Los Angeles County Superior Court for breach of contract, anticipatory repudiation, libel, injurious denial of established fact, intentional infliction of emotional distress, and declaratory relief. On October 9, 1981, both parties in the Mermelstein case filed motions for summary judgment in consideration of which Judge Thomas T. Johnson of the Los Angeles County Superior Court took "judicial notice of the fact that Jews were gassed to death at the Auschwitz Concentration Camp in Poland during the summer of 1944," judicial notice meaning that the court treated the gas chambers as common knowledge, and therefore did not require evidence that the gas chambers existed. On August 5, 1985, Judge Robert A. Wenke entered a judgment based upon the Stipulation for Entry of Judgment agreed upon by the parties on July 22, 1985. The judgment required IHR and other defendants to pay $90,000 to Mermelstein and to issue a letter of apology to "Mr. Mel Mermelstein, a survivor of Auschwitz-Birkenau and Buchenwald, and all other survivors of Auschwitz" for "pain, anguish and suffering" caused to them.

In the "About the IHR" statement on their website, the IHR states, "The IHR does not 'deny' the Holocaust. Indeed, the IHR as such has no 'position' on any specific event...." British historian Richard J. Evans wrote that the Institute's acknowledgment "that a relatively small number of Jews were killed" was a means to draw attention away from its primary beliefs, i.e. that the number of victims was not in the millions and that Jews were not systematically murdered in gas chambers.

=== James Keegstra ===
In 1984, James Keegstra, a Canadian high-school teacher, was charged under the Canadian Criminal Code for "promoting hatred against an identifiable group by communicating anti-Semitic statements to his students". During class, he would describe Jews as a people of profound evil who had "created the Holocaust to gain sympathy." He also tested his students in exams on his theories and opinion of Jews.

Keegstra was charged under s 281.2(2) of the Criminal Code (now s 319(2)), which provides that "Every one who, by communicating statements, other than in private conversation, wilfully promotes hatred against any identifiable group" commits a criminal offense. He was convicted at trial before the Alberta Court of Queen's Bench. The court rejected the argument, advanced by Keegstra and his lawyer, Doug Christie, that promoting hatred is a constitutionally protected freedom of expression as per s 2(b) of the Canadian Charter of Rights and Freedoms. Keegstra appealed to the Alberta Court of Appeal. That court agreed with Keegstra, and he was acquitted. The Crown then appealed the case to the Supreme Court of Canada, which ruled by a 4–3 majority that promoting hatred could be justifiably restricted under s 1 of the Charter. The Supreme Court restored Keegstra's conviction. He was fired from his teaching position shortly afterward.

=== Zündel trials ===
The Toronto-based photo retoucher Ernst Zündel operated a small-press called Samisdat Publishers, which published and distributed Holocaust-denial material such as Did Six Million Really Die? by Richard Harwood (a pseudonym of Richard Verrall – a British neo-Nazi). In 1985, he was tried in R. v. Zundel and convicted under a "false news" law and sentenced to 15 months imprisonment by an Ontario court for "disseminating and publishing material denying the Holocaust". The Holocaust historian Raul Hilberg was a witness for the prosecution at the 1985 trial. Zündel's conviction was overturned in an appeal on a legal technicality, leading to a second trial in 1988, in which he was again convicted. The 1988 trial included, as witnesses for the defense, Fred A. Leuchter, David Irving and Robert Faurisson. The pseudo-scientific Leuchter report was presented as a defense document and was published in Canada in 1988 by Zundel's Samisdat Publishers, and in Britain in 1989 by Irving's Focal Point Publishing. In both of his trials, Zündel was defended by Douglas Christie and Barbara Kulaszka. His conviction was overturned in 1992 when the Supreme Court of Canada declared the "false news" law unconstitutional.

Zündel had a website, web-mastered by his wife Ingrid, which publicized his viewpoints. In January 2002, the Canadian Human Rights Tribunal delivered a ruling in a complaint involving his website, in which it was found to be contravening the Canadian Human Rights Act. The court ordered Zündel to cease communicating hate messages. In February 2003, the American INS arrested him in Tennessee, US, on an immigration violations matter, and few days later, Zündel was sent back to Canada, where he tried to gain refugee status. Zündel remained in prison until March 1, 2005, when he was deported to Germany and prosecuted for disseminating hate propaganda. On February 15, 2007, Zündel was convicted on 14 counts of incitement under Germany's Volksverhetzung law, which bans the incitement of hatred against a portion of the population and given the maximum sentence of five years in prison.

=== Ernst Nolte ===
The German philosopher and historian Ernst Nolte, starting in the 1980s, advanced a set of theories, which though not denying the Holocaust appeared to flirt with an Italian Holocaust denier, Carlo Mattogno, as a serious historian. In a letter to the Israeli historian Otto Dov Kulka of December 8, 1986, Nolte criticized the work of the French Holocaust denier Robert Faurisson on the ground that the Holocaust did occur, but went on to argue that Faurisson's work was motivated by what Nolte claimed were the admirable motives of sympathy towards the Palestinians and opposition to Israel. In his 1987 book Der europäische Bürgerkrieg 1917–1945 (The European Civil War 1917–1945), Nolte wrote that the intentions of Holocaust deniers are "often honourable", and that some of their arguments are "not obviously without foundation". Nolte himself, though he has never denied the occurrence of the Holocaust, has claimed that the Wannsee Conference of 1942 never happened and that the minutes of the conference were post-war forgeries done by "biased" Jewish historians designed to discredit Germany.

The British historian Ian Kershaw has argued that Nolte was operating on the borderlines of Holocaust denial with his implied claim that the "negative myth" of Nazi Germany was created by Jewish historians, his allegations of the domination of Holocaust scholarship by "biased" Jewish historians, and his statements that one should withhold judgment on Holocaust deniers, whom Nolte takes considerable pains to stress are not exclusively Germans or fascists. In Kershaw's opinion, Nolte is attempting to imply that perhaps Holocaust deniers are on to something.

In a 1990 interview, Nolte implied that there was something to the Leuchter report: "If the revisionists [Holocaust deniers] and Leuchter among them have made it clear to the public that even 'Auschwitz' must be an object of scientific inquiry and controversy then they should be given credit for this. Even if it finally turned out that the number of victims was even greater and the procedures were even more horrific than has been assumed until now." In his 1993 book Streitpunkte (Points of Contention), Nolte praised the work of Holocaust deniers as superior to "mainstream scholars". Nolte wrote that "radical revisionists have presented research which, if one is familiar with the source material and the critique of the sources, is probably superior to that of the established historians of Germany". In a 1994 interview with Der Spiegel magazine, Nolte stated "I cannot rule out the importance of the investigation of the gas chambers in which they looked for remnants of the [chemical process engendered by Zyklon B]", and that "'Of course, I am against revisionists, but Fred Leuchter's 'study' of the Nazi gas ovens has to be given attention because one has to stay open to 'other' ideas."

The British historian Richard J. Evans in his 1989 book In Hitler's Shadow expressed the view that Nolte's reputation as a scholar was in ruins as a result of these and other controversial statements on his part. The American historian Deborah Lipstadt in a 2003 interview stated:

Historians such as the German Ernst Nolte are, in some ways, even more dangerous than the deniers. Nolte is an anti-Semite of the first order, who attempts to rehabilitate Hitler by saying that he was no worse than Stalin; but he is careful not to deny the Holocaust. Holocaust-deniers make Nolte's life more comfortable. They have, with their radical argumentation, pulled the center a little more to their side. Consequently, a less radical extremist, such as Nolte, finds himself closer to the middle ground, which makes him more dangerous.

=== Arno Mayer controversy ===
In 1988, the American historian Arno J. Mayer published a book entitled Why Did the Heavens Not Darken?, which did not explicitly deny the Holocaust, but according to Lucy Dawidowicz lent support to Holocaust denial by stating that most people who died at Auschwitz were the victims of "natural causes" such as disease, not gassing. Dawidowicz argued that Mayer's statements about Auschwitz were "a breathtaking assertion". Holocaust historian Robert Jan van Pelt has written that Mayer's book is as close as a mainstream historian has ever come to supporting Holocaust denial. Holocaust deniers such as David Irving have often cited Mayer's book as one reason for embracing Holocaust denial. Though Mayer has been often condemned for his statement about the reasons for the Auschwitz death toll, his book does not deny the use of gas chambers at Auschwitz, as Holocaust deniers often claim.

Some mainstream Holocaust historians have labeled Mayer a denier. The Israeli historian Yehuda Bauer wrote that Mayer "popularizes the nonsense that the Nazis saw in Marxism and Bolshevism their main enemy, and the Jews unfortunately got caught up in this; when he links the destruction of the Jews to the ups and downs of German warfare in the Soviet Union, in a book that is so cocksure of itself that it does not need a proper scientific apparatus, he is really engaging in a much more subtle form of Holocaust denial".

Defenders of Mayer argue that his statement that "Sources for the study of the gas chambers are at once rare and unreliable" has been taken out of context, particularly by Holocaust deniers. Michael Shermer and Alex Grobman observe that the paragraph from which the statement is taken asserts that the SS destroyed the majority of the documentation relating to the operation of the gas chambers in the death camps, which is why Mayer feels that sources for the operation of the gas chambers are "rare" and "unreliable".

== False equivalence and effect ==
=== Denialist focus on Allied war crimes ===
In countries where outright denial of the Holocaust is illegal, Holocaust denial authors focus "on so-called Allied atrocities against the Germans during and after the war." According to historian Deborah Lipstadt, the concept of "comparable Allied wrongs", such as the expulsion of Germans after World War II and the bombing of Dresden, is at the center of, and a continuously repeated theme of, contemporary Holocaust denial; she calls the phenomenon "immoral equivalencies". In 1977, historian Martin Broszat, in a review of David Irving's book Hitler's War, maintained that the picture of World War II drawn by Irving was done in a such way to imply moral equivalence between the actions of the Axis and Allied states with both sides equally guilty of terrible crimes, leading to Hitler's "fanatical, destructive will to annihilate" being downgraded to being "no longer an exceptional phenomenon".

=== Propaganda ===
Holocaust deniers working for the Institute for Historical Review are not trained in history and "put out sham scholarly articles in the mock-academic publication, the Journal of Historical Review". They appeal to "our objectivity, our sense of fair play, and our distrust of figurative language". They rely on facts that are re-interpreted for their use in Holocaust denial.

Holocaust denial propaganda in all forms has been shown to influence the audiences that it reaches. In fact, even the well-educated—that is, college graduates and current university students alike—are susceptible to such propaganda when it is presented before them. This stems from the growing disbelief that audiences feel after being exposed to such information, especially since Holocaust witnesses themselves are decreasing in number. Studies centered on the psychological effects of Holocaust denial propaganda confirm this assertion. Linda M. Yelland and William F. Stone, professors of psychology at the University of Maine, published "Belief in the Holocaust: Effects of Personality and Propaganda" in Political Psychology, which shows that Denial essays decrease readers' belief in the Holocaust, regardless of their prior Holocaust awareness.

== Eastern Europe ==
In some Eastern European countries, such as Ukraine, Lithuania, Latvia, and Romania, Holocaust deniers do not deny the very fact of mass murder of Jews but deny some national or regional elements of the Holocaust.

=== Soviet Union and Russia ===
According to Zvi Gitelman, Soviet writers tended either to ignore or downplay the Holocaust, treating it as one small part of a larger phenomenon of 20 million dead Soviet citizens during the Great Patriotic War. According to Gitelman, Soviet authorities were concerned about raising the consciousness of Soviet Jews and retarding their assimilation to the greater Soviet population. The Holocaust also raised the issue of collaboration with the Nazi occupiers, an uncomfortable topic for Soviet historiography. In modern Russia, the holocaust denial is prohibited by article 354.1 of Criminal Code of Russia; however, according to historian Yuri Pivovarov, this trend has returned. Natella Boltyanskaya notes that in the context of the 2022 Russian invasion of Ukraine, which Russia presents as a "denazification of Ukraine", a 2023 article of Maria Zakharova argued that it were the Soviet citizens who were the victims of Holocaust in the first place. In a number of popular history projects sponsored by the Russian state Jews were mentioned as one of many victim groups, or not mentioned at all.

=== Ukraine ===
The post-Soviet radical right activists in Ukraine do not question the existence of Nazi death camps or Jewish ghettos. However, they deny the participation of local population in anti-Jewish pogroms or the contribution of national paramilitary organizations in capture and execution of Jews. Thus, denial of the antisemitic nature and participation in the Holocaust of the Organisation of Ukrainian Nationalists and the Ukrainian Insurgent Army has become a central component of the intellectual history of the Ukrainian diaspora and nationalists.

=== Croatia ===
In 2018, the United States Department of State warned about "the glorification of the Ustasha regime and denial of the Holocaust" in Croatia, citing the placement of a plaque with the Ustasha-era salute 'Za dom spremni' on the grounds of a concentration camp memorial site, far-right rallies and the concert of the controversial band Thompson among other events. Efraim Zuroff of the Simon Wiesenthal Center describes Croatia as a "cradle of Holocaust distortion". Holocaust denial in Croatia typically involves the downplaying or denial of the Holocaust carried out by the Ustasha regime, particularly against Serbs and Jews at the Jasenovac concentration camp and it is done by public figures, though the regime's victims also included Roma and anti-fascist Croats. The Society for Research of the Threefold Jasenovac Camp in Croatia, an NGO with authors and academics among its members, claims that Jasenovac was a labor camp during World War II and that it was later used by Yugoslav Communists to imprison Ustasha members and regular Croatian Home Guard army troops until 1948, then alleged Stalinists until 1951. Following a series of book publications denying the Ustashe regime's crimes, the Simon Wiesenthal Center urged Croatian authorities in 2019 to ban such works, noting that they "would immediately be banned in Germany and Austria and rightfully so".

=== Hungary ===
In Hungary, Holocaust distortion and denial take place in the form of downplaying the country's role in the killing and deportation of Jews. The Arrow Cross Party committed numerous crimes and killed or deported Jews. A total of 437,000 Jews were deported by Miklós Horthy's government in the Kingdom of Hungary, an Axis collaborator.

=== Serbia ===
In Serbia, Holocaust distortion and denial is manifested in the downplaying of Milan Nedić and Dimitrije Ljotić's roles in the extermination of Serbia's Jews in concentration camps in Nedić's Serbia, by a number of Serbian historians. Serb collaborationist armed forces, including the Chetniks, were involved, either directly or indirectly, in the mass killings of mainly Jews and Roma as well as Croats, Muslims and those Serbs who sided with any anti-German resistance. Since the end of the war, Serbian collaboration in the Holocaust has been the subject of historical revisionism by Serbian leaders.

=== Slovakia ===
In Slovakia, some anti-communist writers claim that Jozef Tiso was a savior of Jews or that the Slovak State was not responsible for the Holocaust in Slovakia.

== Western and Northern Europe ==
=== Belgium ===
In Belgium in 2001, Roeland Raes, the ideologue and vice-president of one of the country's largest political parties, the Vlaams Blok, gave an interview on Dutch TV where he cast doubt over the number of Jews murdered by the Nazis during the Holocaust. In the same interview, he questioned the scale of the Nazis' use of gas chambers and the authenticity of Anne Frank's diary. In response to the media assault following the interview, Raes was forced to resign his position but vowed to remain active within the party. Three years later, the Vlaams Blok was convicted of racism and chose to disband. Immediately afterwards, it legally reformed under the new name Vlaams Belang (Flemish Interest) with the same leaders and the same membership.

In September 2024, the Belgian far-right Vlaams Belang party sparked controversy by putting a convicted Holocaust denier as one of its candidates in the upcoming municipal elections.

=== Finland ===
Holocaust denial started in Finland almost immediately after the war, with many Finns who had been involved in the far-right and Nazi movements publishing articles questioning the Holocaust. Prominent early Finnish Holocaust deniers include professor C. A. J. Gadolin, CEO Carl-Gustaf Herlitz, architech Carl O. Nordling and ambassador Teo Snellman. In early 1970s, a Finnish translation of a pamphlet denying the Holocaust written by Vera Oredsson was distributed in Finland. Pekka Siitoin's Patriotic Popular Front started distributing a Finnish translation of Richard Harwood's Did Six Million Really Die? in 1976.

In the late 1980 and early 1990s, the newspaper Uusi Suunta published by the National Radical Party wrote how the supposed Jewish owned media maligned fascism with Holocaust "sob stories" that "have never been proven" to undermine the nationalist movement. One issue of Uusi Suunta stated that "The horrors of the concentration camps, that are not true by half, have been tied to the nationalist movement regardless of nationality." In the 1990s the party secretary of the National Democratic Party Olavi Koskela said that "the unbelievable Holocaust lies" enable the Jewish rulership over multicultural, multiracial and multilingual society. Finland - Fatherland's newspaper Kansallinen Rintama made similar arguments.

Antisemitism has experienced a resurgence after the Cold War, both in the internet and real life. Medical Licentiate Vesa-Ilkka Laurio wrote a blog frequently denying the Holocaust and criticizing democracy from a Christian fundamentalist perspective. Swedenborgian Nova Hierosolyma society's Uusi Jerusalem website also publishes Holocaust denial material, an article written by Erkki Kivilohkare claiming only 100,000 Jews died in the Holocaust. Another Swedenborgian fundamentalist Markku Juutinen has also denied holocaust in the Kumouksen ääni magazine.

In 2013, the newspaper Magneettimedia and its editor-in-chief, department store tycoon Juha Kärkkäinen, were convicted of agitation against a population group in connection with antisemitic content published in the newspaper. Originally launched as a customer and advertising paper, Magneettimedia was distributed to hundreds of thousands of households through the mail and the Kärkkäinen department store chain. It combined alternative health content and conspiracy theories with increasingly explicit antisemitic material. The newspaper published articles denying the Holocaust and articles such as "Zionist terrorism" and "CNN, Goldman Sachs and Zionist Control" translated from David Duke. Following the conviction, Juha Kärkkäinen withdrew from the publication, and the newspaper continued as an online publication under the control of the association Pohjoinen Perinne, whose leadership has been linked to the neo-Nazi Nordic Resistance Movement. Members of the movement have also distributed Holocaust-denial material in schools. Other alternative media sites, including MV-media and Verkkomedia, are known for publishing articles denying the Holocaust.

Far-right Finns Party General Secretary Olli Immonen has also multiple times shared a blog criticizing the "Holocaust-religion". The Finns Party leader Jussi Halla-aho also referred to Holocaust as "holohoax". Pseudonymous Thomas Dalton who is a prolific author of Holocaust denial books and has republished On the Jews and Their Lies and The Protocols of the Elders of Zion is suspected of being a researcher in University of Helsinki according to Demokraatti.

=== France ===
In France, Holocaust denial became more prominent in the 1990s as négationnisme, though the movement has existed in ultra-left French politics since at least the 1960s, led by figures such as Pierre Guillaume (who was involved in the bookshop La Vieille Taupe during the 1960s). Elements of the extreme far-right in France have begun to build on each other's negationist arguments, which often span beyond the Holocaust to cover a range of antisemitic views, incorporating attempts to tie the Holocaust to the Biblical massacre of the Canaanites, critiques of Zionism, and other material fanning what has been called a "conspiratorial Judeo-phobia" designed to legitimize and "banalize" antisemitism.

=== Germany ===
The trial of a Canadian woman, Monika Schaefer, and her German-Canadian brother, Alfred Schaefer started in Germany in early July 2018. They were charged with Volksverhetzung (literally 'incitement of the people', often phrased as 'incitement to hatred' in English-language media). The pair had published video clips on YouTube of their denial of the genocide of Jews. In the clips, Alfred Schaefer said that Jews wanted to destroy Germans, blamed them for starting both World Wars, and referred to the Holocaust as a "Jewish fantasy". Monika Schaefer was arrested in January 2018 in Germany while attending a court hearing of Sylvia Stolz. Schaefer had been the Green Party candidate in the Alberta riding of Yellowhead during the federal elections in 2006, 2008, and 2011, but was expelled from the party after news reports surfaced of a July 2016 video where she describes the Holocaust as "the most persistent lie in all of history" and insisted that those in concentration camps had been kept as healthy and as well-fed as possible. In late October 2018, Monika Schaefer was convicted of the charge of 'incitement of hatred'. She was sentenced to ten months while Alfred Schaefer, also convicted, received a sentence of three years and two months.

=== United Kingdom ===
In January 2019, a survey conducted by Opinion Matters, on behalf of the Holocaust Memorial Day Trust found that 5% of UK adults did not believe the Holocaust took place and one in 12 (8%) believed its scale has been exaggerated. One in five respondents incorrectly answered that less than 2 million Jews were murdered, and 45% couldn't say how many people were murdered in the Holocaust. Speaking in light of the survey's findings, Karen Pollock, chief executive of the Holocaust Educational Trust, said: "One person questioning the truth of the Holocaust is one too many, and so it is up to us to redouble our efforts to ensure future generations know that it did happen and become witnesses to one of the darkest episodes in our history." The BBC Radio 4 programme More or Less, specializing on statistics, investigated the survey finding it was unlikely to be accurate. Participants were incentivized to complete the online survey by shopping vouchers encouraging speedy answering, and the principal question was a "reverse question" with most participants having to give the reverse answer to surrounding questions requiring careful answering. Another question asked how many Jewish people had been murdered in the holocaust with only 0.2% of participants giving the answer zero, which was considered to be a closer estimate of the number of UK adults that did not believe the Holocaust took place.

== Middle East ==
Gamal Abdel Nasser, the President of Egypt, told a German newspaper in 1964 that "no person, not even the most simple one, takes seriously the lie of the six million Jews that were murdered [in the Holocaust]."

Denials of the Holocaust have been promoted by various Middle Eastern figures and media. Holocaust denial is sponsored by some Middle Eastern governments, including Iran and Syria. In 2006 Robert Satloff writing in The Washington Post, reported that "A respected Holocaust research institution recently reported that Egypt, Qatar and Saudi Arabia all promote Holocaust denial and protect Holocaust deniers."

Prominent figures from the Middle East have rarely made publicized visits to Auschwitz—Israel's Arab community being the exception. In 2010, Hadash MK Mohammed Barakeh visited, following a previous visit of two other Arab-Israeli lawmakers, and a group of about 100 Arab-Israeli writers and clerics in 2003.

=== Iran ===
Until recently, the Islamic Republic was the only state whose leadership and institutions openly engaged in Holocaust denial (and at times, justification) as part of official ideology. Iranian discourse often portrays the Holocaust as a fabricated myth, allegedly invented by a Zionist–American alliance to justify the creation of Israel and expand Western influence. This framing serves to delegitimize Jewish statehood and legitimize the destruction of Israel. The Iranian government has also shifted blame for global injustice during World War II from Nazi Germany to the United States, which is seen as greatest cultural threat to Islam. Mark Weitzman of the World Jewish Restitution Organization described Iran as the "center of Muslim Holocaust denial."

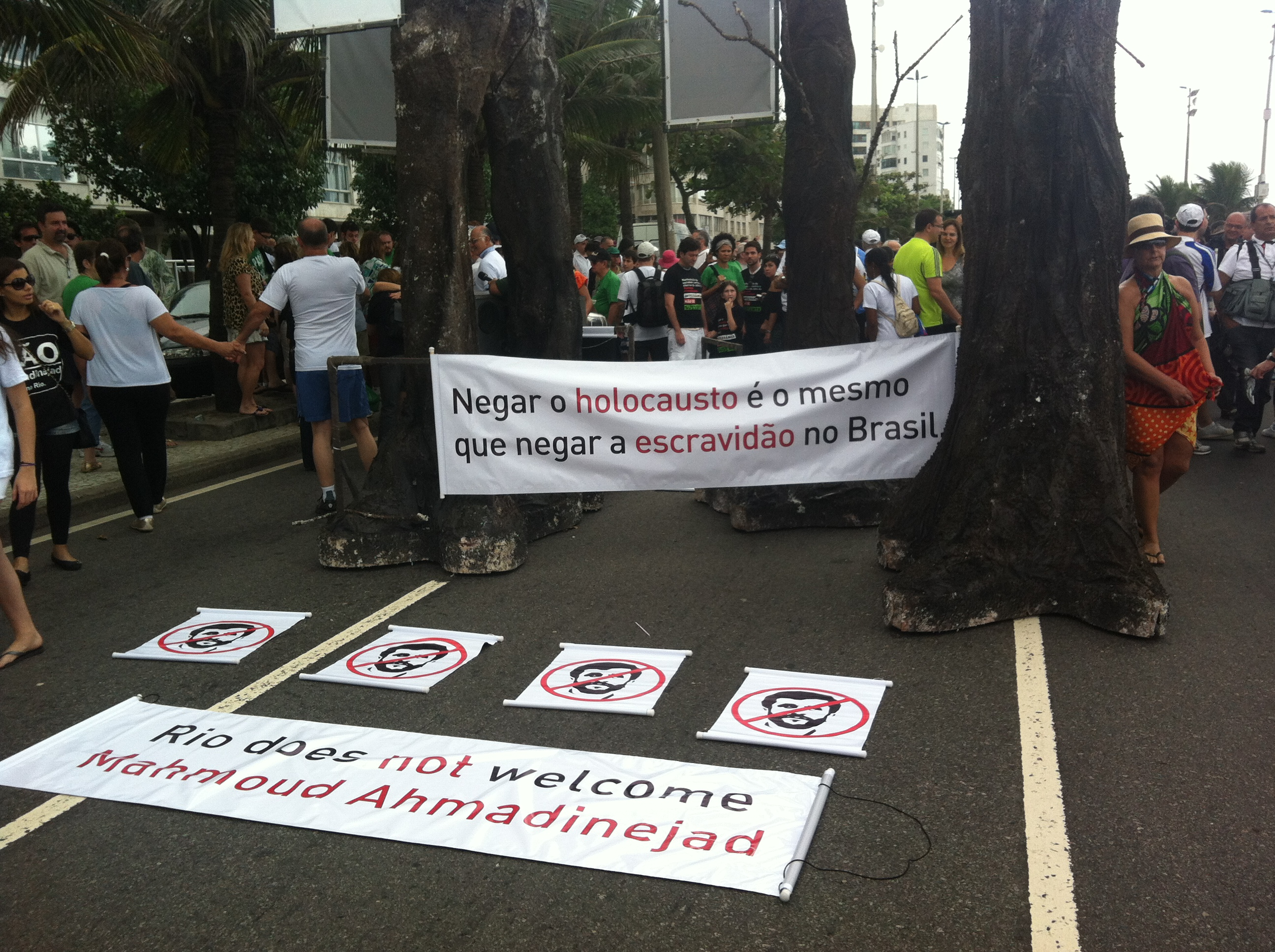
Protest in Brazil against former Iranian President Mahmoud Ahmadinejad, criticizing his Holocaust denial

Former Iranian President Mahmoud Ahmadinejad frequently denied the Holocaust, formally 'questioning' the reliability of the historical evidence, although he on occasion confirmed belief in it. In a December 2005 speech, Ahmadinejad said that a legend was fabricated and had been promoted to protect Israel.

The Supreme Leader of Iran Khamenei denied the Holocaust on multiple occasions.

He said:

They have fabricated a legend, under the name of the Massacre of the Jews, and they hold it higher than God himself, religion itself and the prophets themselves.... If somebody in their country questions God, nobody says anything, but if somebody denies the myth of the massacre of Jews, the Zionist loudspeakers and the governments in the pay of Zionism will start to scream.

The remarks immediately provoked international controversy as well as swift condemnation from government officials in Israel, Europe, and the United States. All six political parties in the German parliament signed a joint resolution condemning Ahmadinejad's Holocaust denial. In contrast, Hamas political leader Khaled Mashal described Ahmadinejad's comments as "courageous" and stated, "Muslim people will defend Iran because it voices what they have in their hearts, in particular the Palestinian people." In the United States, the Muslim Public Affairs Council condemned Ahmadinejad's remarks. In 2005, the Egyptian Muslim Brotherhood leader, Mohammed Mahdi Akef, denounced what he called "the myth of the Holocaust" in defending Ahmadinejad's denial of the Holocaust.

On December 11, 2006, the Iranian state-sponsored "International Conference to Review the Global Vision of the Holocaust" began to widespread condemnation. The conference, called for and held at the behest of Ahmadinejad, was widely described as a "Holocaust denial conference" or a "meeting of Holocaust deniers", though Iran denied it was a Holocaust denial conference. A few months before it opened, the Iranian Foreign Ministry spokesman Hamid Reza Asefi stated: "The Holocaust is not a sacred issue that one can't touch. I have visited the Nazi camps in Eastern Europe. I think it is exaggerated."

Iran was the only country to vote against UN Resolution 61/255 condemning Holocaust denial in 2007. The editor of Kayhan, a newspaper linked to the Supreme Leader, dismissed the resolution as "“preparing the United Nations' corpse for burial in the graveyard of history." Some Iranian officials claim the Holocaust was exploited to suppress anti-Zionist sentiment in Europe and enable Zionist "murderous goals."

In 2013, in an interview with CNN, newly elected Iranian President Hassan Rouhani condemned the Holocaust, stating: "I can tell you that any crime that happens in history against humanity, including the crime the Nazis created towards the Jews as well as non-Jews is reprehensible and condemnable. Whatever criminality they committed against the Jews, we condemn." Iranian media later accused CNN of fabricating Rouhani's comments.

In his official 2013 Nowruz address, Supreme Leader of Iran Grand Ayatollah Ali Khamenei questioned the veracity of the Holocaust, remarking that "The Holocaust is an event whose reality is uncertain and if it has happened, it's uncertain how it has happened." This was consistent with Khamenei's previous comments regarding the Holocaust.

In 2015, the House of Cartoon and the Sarcheshmeh Cultural Complex in Iran organized the Second International Holocaust Cartoon Competition, a competition in which artists were encouraged to submit cartoons on the theme of Holocaust denial. The winner of the contest received $12,000. Hamshahri, a popular Iranian newspaper, held a similar contest in 2006.

=== Israel ===
Israel's Prime Minister, Benjamin Netanyahu, at a speech to the World Zionist Congress in 2015, claimed Adolf Hitler did not want to exterminate Jews but only wanted to expel them from Europe, and the extermination of the Jews was the idea of Haj Amin al-Husseini, the Grand Mufti of Jerusalem. Scholars denied this claim, including Moshe Zimmermann who said that it reinforced the opinions of the far-right and Holocaust deniers. Zimmerman stated that "Any attempt to deflect the burden from Hitler to others is a form of Holocaust denial". Netanyahu later told reporters that he was not letting Hitler off the hook for the Holocaust and that the Mufti's role should not be ignored.

=== Palestine ===
Individuals from the Palestinian Authority, Hamas, and a number of Palestinian groups have engaged in various aspects of Holocaust denial.

Hamas has promoted Holocaust denial; Abdel Aziz al-Rantisi held the view that the Holocaust never occurred, that Zionists were behind the action of Nazis, and that Zionists funded Nazism. A press release by Hamas in April 2000 decried "the so-called Holocaust, which is an alleged and invented story with no basis". In August 2009, Hamas' told UNRWA that it would "refuse" to allow Palestinian children to study the Holocaust, which it called "a lie invented by the Zionists" and referred to Holocaust education as a "war crime". Hamas continued to hold this position in 2011, when the organization's Ministry for Refugee Affairs said that Holocaust education was "intended to poison the minds of our children."

The thesis of the 1982 doctoral dissertation of Mahmoud Abbas, a co-founder of Fatah and president of the Palestinian Authority, was "The Secret Connection between the Nazis and the Leaders of the Zionist Movement". In his 1983 book The Other Side: the Secret Relationship Between Nazism and Zionism based on the dissertation, Abbas denied that six million Jews had died in the Holocaust; dismissing it as a "myth" and a "fantastic lie". At most, he wrote, 890,000 Jews were murdered by the Germans. Abbas claimed that the number of deaths has been exaggerated for political purposes. "It seems that the interest of the Zionist movement, however, is to inflate this figure [of Holocaust deaths] so that their gains will be greater. This led them to emphasize this figure [six million] in order to gain the solidarity of international public opinion with Zionism. Many scholars have debated the figure of six million and reached stunning conclusions—fixing the number of Jewish victims at only a few hundred thousand."

In his March 2006 interview with Haaretz, Abbas stated, "I wrote in detail about the Holocaust and said I did not want to discuss numbers. I quoted an argument between historians in which various numbers of casualties were mentioned. One wrote there were 12 million victims and another wrote there were 800,000. I have no desire to argue with the figures. The Holocaust was a terrible, unforgivable crime against the Jewish nation, a crime against humanity that cannot be accepted by humankind. The Holocaust was a terrible thing and nobody can claim I denied it." While acknowledging the existence of the Holocaust in 2006 and 2014, Abbas has defended the position that Zionists collaborated with the Nazis to perpetrate it. In 2012, Abbas told Al Mayadeen, a Beirut TV station affiliated with Iran and Hezbollah, that he "challenges anyone who can deny that the Zionist movement had ties with the Nazis before World War II".

Surveys conducted by Sammy Smooha of the University of Haifa found that the fraction of Palestinian citizens of Israel denying the Holocaust increased from 28% in 2006 to 40% in 2008. Smooha commented:

In Arab eyes disbelief in the very happening of the Shoah is not hate of Jews (embedded in the denial of the Shoah in the West) but rather a form of protest. Arabs not believing in the event of Shoah intend to express strong objection to the portrayal of the Jews as the ultimate victim and to the underrating of the Palestinians as a victim. They deny Israel's right to exist as a Jewish state that the Shoah gives legitimacy to. Arab disbelief in the Shoah is a component of the Israeli-Palestinian conflict, unlike the ideological and anti-Semitic denial of the Holocaust and the desire to escape guilt in the West.

Mohammed Dajani, a Palestinian professor at Al-Quds University and founding director of its American Studies Institute, took a group of students to visit the Auschwitz concentration camp in 2014. Following the trip, he faced strong opposition and pressure from within the university, ultimately leading to his resignation. Dajani later explained that critics believed the knowledge students might gain from the visit would contradict the prevailing collective narrative, in which some viewed the Holocaust as a Zionist narrative intended to garner international support for Israel. Still, he defended Holocaust education as essential for peace, stating:

Holocaust denial and distortion are historically incorrect, and factually wrong, and constitute a significant threat to morality and human dignity, and to the prospects of reconciliation and peace between Palestinians and Israelis.

=== Syria ===
In a speech delivered at the Arab Socialist Ba'ath Party's central committee meeting in December 2023, the Ba'ath party secretary-general Bashar al-Assad claimed that there was "no evidence" of the killings of six million Jews during the Holocaust. Assad alleged that the Holocaust was "politicized" by Allied powers to facilitate the mass-deportation of European Jews to Palestine. Assad also accused the U.S. government of financially and militarily sponsoring the rise of Nazism during the inter-war period. Highlighting the deaths of 26 million Soviet citizens during the Second World War, Assad said: "there was no specific method of torture or killing specific to the Jews. The Nazis used the same methods everywhere."

=== Turkey ===
In Turkey, in 1996, the Islamic preacher Adnan Oktar under the pen name of Harun Yahya, distributed thousands of copies of a book which was originally published the previous year, entitled Soykırım Yalanı ("The Genocide Lie", referring to the Holocaust) and mailed unsolicited texts to American and European schools and colleges. The publication of Soykırım Yalanı sparked much public debate. This book claims, "what is presented as Holocaust is the death of some Jews due to the typhus plague during the war and the famine towards the end of the war caused by the defeat of the Germans." In March 1996, a Turkish painter and intellectual, Bedri Baykam, published a strongly worded critique of the book in the Ankara daily newspaper Siyah-Beyaz ("Black and White"). A legal suit for slander was brought against him. During the trial in September, Baykam exposed the real author of the book as Adnan Oktar. The suit was withdrawn in March 1997.

== Other ==
=== Japan ===
Japanese Holocaust denial first appeared in 1989 and reached its peak in 1995 with the publication in February 1995 by the Japanese magazine Marco Polo, a 250,000-circulation monthly published by Bungeishunju, of a Holocaust denial article by physician Masanori Nishioka which stated: "The 'Holocaust' is a fabrication. There were no execution gas chambers in Auschwitz or in any other concentration camp. Today, what is displayed as 'gas chambers' at the remains of the Auschwitz camp in Poland are a post-war fabrication by the Polish communist regime or by the Soviet Union, which controlled the country. Not once, neither at Auschwitz nor in any territory controlled by the Germans during the Second World War, was there 'mass murder of Jews' in 'gas chambers." The Los Angeles-based Simon Wiesenthal Center instigated a boycott of Bungei Shunju advertisers, including Volkswagen, Mitsubishi, and Cartier. Within days, Bungei Shunju shut down Marco Polo and its editor, Kazuyoshi Hanada, quit, as did the president of Bungei Shunju, Kengo Tanaka.

=== United States ===
According to a 2020 survey of US youth by the Claims Conference, 23% of US adults aged 18–39 said they believed the Holocaust was a myth, had been exaggerated, or were not sure.

== Reactions ==
In 2022, the United Nations adopted a resolution aimed at combating Holocaust denial and antisemitism. The resolution was proposed by Germany and Israel.

=== Scholars ===
Scholarly response to Holocaust denial can be roughly divided into three categories. Some academics refuse to engage Holocaust deniers or their arguments at all, on grounds that doing so lends them unwarranted legitimacy. The second group of scholars, typified by the American historian Deborah Lipstadt, have tried to raise awareness of the methods and motivations of Holocaust denial without legitimizing the deniers themselves. "We need not waste time or effort answering the deniers' contentions," Lipstadt wrote. "It would be never-ending.... Their commitment is to an ideology and their 'findings' are shaped to support it." A third group, typified by the Nizkor Project, responds to arguments and claims made by Holocaust denial groups by pointing out inaccuracies and errors in their evidence.

In December 1991 the American Historical Association, the oldest and largest society of historians and teachers of history in the United States, issued the following statement: "The American Historical Association Council strongly deplores the publicly reported attempts to deny the fact of the Holocaust. No serious historian questions that the Holocaust took place." This followed a strong reaction by many of its members and commentary in the press against a near-unanimous decision that the AHA had made in May 1991 that studying the significance of the Holocaust should be encouraged. The association's May 1991 statement was in response to an incident where certain of its members had questioned the reality of the Holocaust. The December 1991 declaration is a reversal of the AHA's earlier stance that the association should not set a precedent by certifying historical facts. The AHA has also stated that Holocaust denial is "at best, a form of academic fraud".

Literary theorist Jean Baudrillard described Holocaust denial as "part of the extermination itself". Holocaust survivor and Nobel Prize winner Elie Wiesel, during a 1999 discussion at the White House in Washington, D.C., called the Holocaust "the most documented tragedy in recorded history. Never before has a tragedy elicited so much witness from the killers, from the victims and even from the bystanders—millions of pieces here in the museum what you have, all other museums, archives in the thousands, in the millions."

Deborah Lipstadt's 1993 book, Denying the Holocaust, sharply criticized various Holocaust deniers, including British author David Irving, for deliberately misrepresenting evidence to justify their preconceived conclusions. In the book, Lipstadt named Irving as "one of the more dangerous" Holocaust deniers, because he was a published author, and was viewed by some as a legitimate military historian. He was "familiar with historical evidence", she wrote, and "bends it until it conforms with his ideological leanings and political agenda". In 1996, Irving filed a libel suit against Lipstadt and her publisher, Penguin Books. Irving, who appeared as a defense witness in Ernst Zündel's trial in Canada, and once declared at a rally of Holocaust deniers that "more women died in the back seat of Edward Kennedy's car than ever died in a gas chamber at Auschwitz", claimed that Lipstadt's allegation damaged his reputation. American historian Christopher R. Browning, an expert witness for the defense, wrote a comprehensive essay for the court summarizing the voluminous evidence for the reality of the Holocaust, and under cross-examination, effectively countered all of Irving's principal arguments to the contrary.[96] Cambridge historian Richard J. Evans, another defense expert witness, spent two years examining Irving's writings and confirmed his misrepresentations, including evidence that he had knowingly used forged documents as source material. After a two-month trial in London the trial judge, Justice Charles Gray, issued a 333-page ruling against Irving, which referred to him as a "Holocaust denier" and "right-wing pro-Nazi polemicist".

Ken McVay, an American resident in Canada, was disturbed by the efforts of organizations like the Simon Wiesenthal Center to suppress the speech of the Holocaust deniers, feeling that it was better to confront them openly than to try to censor them. On the Usenet newsgroup alt.revisionism he began a campaign of "truth, fact, and evidence", working with other participants on the newsgroup to uncover factual information about the Holocaust and counter the arguments of the deniers by proving them to be based upon misleading evidence, false statements, and outright lies. He founded the Nizkor Project to expose the activities of the Holocaust deniers, who responded to McVay with personal attacks, slander, and death threats.

=== Public figures ===
A number of public figures have spoken out against Holocaust denial. In 2006, UN Secretary-General Kofi Annan said: "Remembering is a necessary rebuke to those who say the Holocaust never happened or has been exaggerated. Holocaust denial is the work of bigots; we must reject their false claims whenever, wherever and by whomever they are made." In January 2007, the United Nations General Assembly condemned "without reservation any denial of the Holocaust", though Iran disassociated itself from the resolution.

In July 2013, Iran's then president-elect Hassan Rohani described Ahmadinejad's remarks about the Holocaust and Israel as "hate rhetoric" and in September 2013 Rohani stated that "The Nazis carried out a massacre that cannot be denied, especially against the Jewish people" and "The massacre by the Nazis was condemnable. We never want to sit by side with the Nazis...They committed a crime against Jews — which is a crime against ... all of humanity." While declining to give a specific number of Jewish victims, Iranian analysts suggested that "Rouhani pushed the envelope as far as it could go ... without infuriating the supreme leader, Ayatollah Ali Khamenei, and other conservatives back home."

=== Former Auschwitz SS personnel ===
Critics of Holocaust denial also include members of the Auschwitz SS. Camp physician and SS-Untersturmführer Hans Münch considered the facts of Auschwitz "so firmly determined that one cannot have any doubt at all", and described those who negate what happened at the camp as "malevolent" people who have "personal interest to want to bury in silence things that cannot be buried in silence". Zyklon B handler and SS-Oberscharführer Josef Klehr said that anyone who maintains that nobody was gassed at Auschwitz must be "crazy or in the wrong". SS-Unterscharführer Oswald Kaduk stated that he did not consider those who maintain such a thing as normal people. Hearing about Holocaust denial compelled former SS-Rottenführer Oskar Gröning to publicly speak about what he witnessed at Auschwitz, and denounce Holocaust deniers, stating:

I would like you to believe me. I saw the gas chambers. I saw the crematoria. I saw the open fires. I was on the ramp when the selections took place. I would like you to believe that these atrocities happened because I was there.

=== Relation to antisemitism ===
Holocaust denial is given as an example of antisemitism in the IHRA definition of antisemitism, adopted by the International Holocaust Remembrance Alliance as well as the United Kingdom, Israel, Austria, Scotland, Romania, Germany and Bulgaria. The European Parliament voted in favor of a resolution calling for member states to adopt the definition on June 1, 2017.

The Encyclopedia of Genocide and Crimes Against Humanity defines Holocaust denial as "a new form of anti-Semitism, but one that hinges on age-old motifs". The Anti-Defamation League has stated that "Holocaust denial is a contemporary form of the classic anti-Semitic doctrine of the evil, manipulative and threatening world Jewish conspiracy" and French historian Valérie Igounet has written that "Holocaust denial is a convenient polemical substitute for anti-semitism."

According to Walter Reich, psychiatrist and then a senior scholar at the Woodrow Wilson International Center for Scholars, one-time director of the United States Holocaust Memorial Museum, and now professor of international affairs at George Washington University:

The primary motivation for most deniers is anti-Semitism, and for them the Holocaust is an infuriatingly inconvenient fact of history. After all, the Holocaust has generally been recognized as one of the most terrible crimes that ever took place, and surely the very emblem of evil in the modern age. If that crime was a direct result of anti-Semitism taken to its logical end, then anti-Semitism itself, even when expressed in private conversation, is inevitably discredited among most people. What better way to rehabilitate anti-Semitism, make anti-Semitic arguments seem once again respectable in civilized discourse and even make it acceptable for governments to pursue anti-Semitic policies than by convincing the world that the great crime for which anti-Semitism was blamed simply never happened—indeed, that it was nothing more than a frame-up invented by the Jews, and propagated by them through their control of the media? What better way, in short, to make the world safe again for anti-Semitism than by denying the Holocaust?

The French historian Pierre Vidal-Naquet described the motivation of deniers more succinctly, explaining, "One revives the dead in order the better to strike the living." German political scientist Matthias Küntzel has argued, "Every denial of the Holocaust... contains an appeal to repeat it."

== Examination of claims ==
The key claims which cause Holocaust denial to differ from established fact are:

- The Nazis had no official policy or intention of exterminating Jews.
- The Nazis did not use gas chambers to mass murder Jews.
- The figure of 5 to 6 million Jewish deaths is a gross exaggeration, and the actual number is an order of magnitude lower, with many online claims saying only 271,000 Jews were murdered.

Other claims include the following:

- Stories of the Holocaust were a myth initially created by the Allies of World War II to demonize Germans, Jews having spread this myth as part of a grander plot intended to enable the creation of a Jewish homeland in Palestine, and now to garner continuing support for the state of Israel.
- Documentary evidence of the Holocaust, from photographs to The Diary of Anne Frank, is fabricated.
- Survivor testimonies are filled with errors and inconsistencies and are thus unreliable.
- Interrogators obtained Nazi prisoners' confessions of war crimes through the use of torture.
- The Nazi treatment of Jews was no different from what the Allies did to their enemies in World War II.

Holocaust denial is widely viewed as failing to adhere to principles for the treatment of evidence that mainstream historians (as well as scholars in other fields) regard as basic to rational inquiry.

The Holocaust was well documented by the bureaucracy of the Nazi government itself. It was further witnessed by the Allied forces who entered Germany and its associated Axis states towards the end of World War II. It was also witnessed from the inside by non-Jewish captives such as Catholic French Resistance member André Rogerie who wrote extensively and testified about his experiences in seven camps including Auschwitz-Birkenau and also produced the oldest contemporary sketch of a camp crematorium.

According to researchers Michael Shermer and Alex Grobman, there is a "convergence of evidence" that proves that the Holocaust happened. This evidence includes:

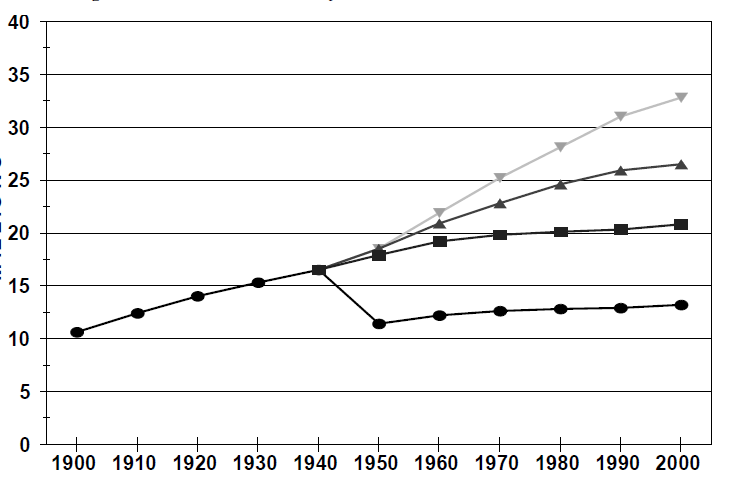
Jewish World Population without Holocaust (mln people) by Sergio Della Pergola

1. Written documents—hundreds of thousands of letters, memos, blueprints, orders, bills, speeches, articles, memoirs, and confessions.
2. Eyewitness testimony—accounts from survivors, Jewish Sonderkommandos (who helped load bodies from the gas chambers into the crematoria in exchange for a chance of survival), SS guards, commandants, local townspeople, and even high-ranking Nazis who spoke openly about the mass murder of the Jews.
3. Photographs—including official military and press photographs, civilian photographs, secret photographs taken by survivors, aerial photographs, German and Allied film footage, and unofficial photographs taken by the German military.
4. The camps themselves—concentration camps, work camps, and extermination camps that still exist in varying degrees of originality and reconstruction.
5. Inferential evidence or argument from silence—population demographics, reconstructed from the pre–World War II era; if six million Jews were not murdered, what happened to them?

Much of the controversy surrounding the claims of Holocaust deniers' centers on the methods used to present arguments that the Holocaust allegedly never happened as commonly accepted. Numerous accounts have been given by Holocaust deniers (including evidence presented in court cases) of claimed facts and evidence; however, independent research has shown these claims to be based upon flawed research, biassed statements, or even deliberately falsified evidence. Opponents of Holocaust denial have documented numerous instances in which such evidence was altered or manufactured (see Nizkor Project and David Irving). According to Pierre Vidal-Naquet, "in our society of image and spectacle, extermination on paper leads to extermination in reality."

== Laws against Holocaust denial ==
Countries where Holocaust denial is illegal

Holocaust denial is explicitly or implicitly illegal in 18 countries: Austria, Belgium, Canada, the Czech Republic, France, Germany, Hungary, Israel, Liechtenstein, Lithuania, Luxembourg, the Netherlands, Poland, Portugal, Romania, Russia, Slovakia, and Switzerland. Romania officially denied the Holocaust occurred on its territory up until the Wiesel Commission in 2004. The European Union's Framework decision on Racism and Xenophobia states that denying or grossly trivializing "crimes of genocide" should be made "punishable in all EU Member States".

Such legislation remains controversial. In October 2007, a tribunal declared Spain's genocide denial law unconstitutional. In 2007 Italy rejected a denial law proposing a prison sentence of up to four years. In 2006 the Netherlands rejected a draft law proposing a maximum sentence of one year on denial of genocidal acts in general, although specifically denying the Holocaust remains a criminal offense there. The United Kingdom has twice rejected Holocaust denial laws. Denmark and Sweden have also rejected such legislation.

A number of deniers have been prosecuted under various countries' denial laws. French literature professor Robert Faurisson, for example, was convicted and punished under the Gayssot Act in 1990. Some historians oppose such laws, among them Pierre Vidal-Naquet, an outspoken critic of Faurisson, on the grounds that denial legislation imposes "historical truth as legal truth". Other academics favor criminalization. Holocaust denial, they contend, is "the worst form of racism and its most respectable version because it pretends to be a research". Holocaust historian Deborah Lipstadt expressed her opposition to laws against expressing Holocaust denial, saying, "I don't think they work. I think they turn whatever is being outlawed into forbidden fruit." She also said that politicians should not be able to decide what can and cannot be said.

=== David Irving conviction ===
In February 2006, Irving was convicted in Austria, where Holocaust denial is illegal, for a speech he had made in 1989 in which he denied the existence of gas chambers at Auschwitz. Irving was aware of the outstanding arrest warrant but chose to go to Austria anyway "to give a lecture to a far-right student fraternity". Although he pleaded guilty to the charge, Irving said he had been "mistaken", and had changed his opinions on the Holocaust. "I said that then, based on my knowledge at the time, but by 1991 when I came across the Eichmann papers, I wasn't saying that anymore and I wouldn't say that now. The Nazis did murder millions of Jews." Irving served 13 months of a 3-year sentence in an Austrian prison, including the period between his arrest and conviction, and was deported in early 2007. The episode sparked intense international debate over the limits of freedom of speech. Upon hearing of Irving's sentence, Lipstadt said:

I am not happy when censorship wins, and I don't believe in winning battles via censorship.... The way of fighting Holocaust deniers is with history and with truth.

According to CNN, upon Irving's return to the UK, he "vow[ed] to repeat views denying the Holocaust that led to his conviction" stating he felt "no need any longer to show remorse" for his Holocaust views.

== Comparison to other genocide denials ==
Other acts of genocide have met similar attempts to deny and minimize them. Gregory Stanton, formerly of the US State Department and the founder of Genocide Watch, lists denial as the final stage of a genocide development: "Denial is the eighth stage that always follows a genocide. It is among the surest indicators of further genocidal massacres. The perpetrators of genocide dig up the mass graves, burn the bodies, try to cover up the evidence and intimidate the witnesses. They deny that they committed any crimes, and often blame what happened on the victims."

Holocaust denial is often compared to Armenian genocide denial because of similar tactics of misrepresenting evidence, false equivalence, claiming that atrocities were invented by war propaganda and that powerful lobbies manufacture genocide allegations for their own profit, subsuming one-sided systematic extermination into war deaths, and shifting blame from the perpetrators to the victims of genocide. Both forms of negationism share the goal of rehabilitating the ideologies which brought genocide about.

== See also ==
Holocaust:

- Double genocide theory
- Romani Holocaust
- Secondary antisemitism

Other:

- Anti-BDS laws
- Denialism
- Khazar hypothesis of Ashkenazi ancestry
- Myth of the clean Wehrmacht
- Denial of the October 7 attacks
- Gaza genocide denial
- Pseudohistory
- Temple denial
