= Ernst Zündel =

German Holocaust denier (1939–2017)

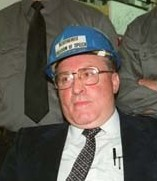
- Zündel in 1992
- Born: Ernst Christof Friedrich Zündel; 24 April 1939; Calmbach, Württemberg, Nazi Germany
- Died: 5 August 2017 (aged 78); Bad Wildbad, Baden-Württemberg, Germany
- Occupations: Graphic artist; photographer; photo retoucher; printer
- Known for: Neo-Nazism; Holocaust denial
- Political party: Ralliement créditiste (before 1968); Liberal (1968); Social Credit (1983–1987)
- Spouses: Janick Larouche (m. 1959; div. 1975), Irene Margarelli (m. 1996; div. 1997), Ingrid Rimland (m. 2001)
- Children: 2

Ernst Christof Friedrich Zündel (German: [ˈtsʏndl̩]; 24 April 1939 – 5 August 2017) was a German neo-Nazi publisher and pamphleteer of Holocaust denial literature. He was jailed several times: in Canada for publishing literature "likely to incite hatred against an identifiable group", and on charges of being a threat to national security; in the United States, for overstaying his visa; and in Germany for charges of "inciting racial hatred". He lived in Canada from 1958 to 2000.

In 1977, Zündel founded a small press publishing house called Samisdat Publishers, which issued neo-Nazi pamphlets such as his co-authored The Hitler We Loved and Why and Richard Verrall's Did Six Million Really Die? The Truth At Last, which were both significant documents to the Holocaust denial movement. (Note: Verrall's pamphlet should not be confused with Barbara Kulaszka's book Did Six Million Really Die? Report on the Evidence in the Canadian "False News" Trial of Ernst Zündel, 1988.)

On 5 February 2003, Ernst Zündel was detained by local police in the U.S. and deported to Canada, where he was detained for two years on a security certificate for being a foreign national considered a threat to national security pending a court decision on the validity of the certificate. Once the certificate was upheld, he was deported to Germany and tried in the state court of Mannheim on outstanding charges of incitement of Holocaust denial dating from the early 1990s. On February 15, 2007, he was convicted and sentenced to the maximum term of five years in prison. All these imprisonments and prosecutions were for inciting hatred against an identifiable group. He was released on March 1, 2010.

== Early life ==
Zündel was born in Calmbach (now part of Bad Wildbad) in Baden-Württemberg, Germany, in 1939 and was raised mostly by his mother, Gertrude. According to Toronto Sun columnist Mark Bonokoski, Zündel's mother was Gertrude Mayer, the daughter of Isadore and Nagal Mayer. Isadore Mayer was a trade union organizer for the garment industry in the Bavarian city of Augsburg. According to Bonokoski, Ernst's ex-wife, Irene Zündel, claimed that the possibility of being at least partly Jewish bothered Zündel so much that he returned to Germany in the 1960s in search of his family's Ariernachweis, a Third Reich certificate of pure Aryan blood, but was unable to find any such document.

In 1997, Zündel granted an interview to Tsadok Yecheskeli of the Israeli newspaper, Yedioth Ahronoth, in which he acknowledged that he "had a little fright there in the '60s" as to whether he might have had Jewish ancestry through his grandfather Isadore, but in the end after a series of non-committal answers denied to the interviewer that he was of Jewish descent. According to his second wife, he had at times considered evading a possible jail sentence in Germany by declaring himself to be a Jew in order to exercise the "right of return" under Israeli law and seek asylum there.

His father, Fritz, a lumberjack, was drafted into the German Army shortly after Ernst's birth and served as a medic on the Eastern Front. His father was captured and incarcerated as a prisoner of war and did not return home until 1947, by which time he had become an alcoholic. Ernst was the fourth in a family of six children consisting of a brother, who later became a lawyer in the United States, and four sisters.

He studied graphic art at trade school, graduating in 1957 and emigrated to Canada in 1958, when he was 19, to avoid conscription by the German military. In 1960, he married French-Canadian Janick Larouche, whom he had met in 1959 in a language class in Toronto, and with whom he had sons Pierre and Hans. The couple moved to Montreal in 1961, where Zündel would eventually come under the tutelage of Canadian fascist politician Adrien Arcand.

== Career ==
Professionally, Zündel worked as a graphic artist, photographer, photo retoucher, and printer. He got his first job in the art department at Simpson-Sears in Toronto before opening his own art studio in Montreal. In 1969, he moved back to Toronto, where he founded Great Ideas Advertising, a commercial art studio.

On several occasions in the 1960s he was commissioned to illustrate covers for Maclean's magazine. His controversial views were not well known in the 1960s and 1970s, since he published his opinions under the pseudonym Christof Friedrich. At the time, he was also an organizer among immigrants for the Ralliement des créditistes, Quebec's Social Credit party. In 1968, he joined the Liberal Party of Canada and ran in that year's Liberal leadership convention under the anglicized name Ernest Zundel as a self-described "nuisance candidate", running on an "immigrant rights" platform. He used his candidacy to campaign against anti-German attitudes. He dropped out of the contest prior to the election, but not before delivering his campaign speech to the convention.

In 1978 Zündel founded Concerned Parents of German Descent, a group that claimed German-Canadians and their children were the target of discrimination due to anti-German stereotyping in the media. In that year, Zündel, as the group's spokesman and its self-proclaimed "führer", issued press releases protesting the NBC Holocaust miniseries for its depiction of Germans, describing the show as "Zionist propaganda". In the late 1970s, reporter Mark Bonokoski unmasked Zündel, revealing that he was publishing neo-Nazi and antisemitic pamphlets such as The Hitler We Loved and Why under the pseudonym Christof Friedrich.

== Holocaust denial ==
His publishing company, Samisdat Publishers, disseminated neo-Nazi literature, including Zündel's The Hitler We Loved and Why, Richard Verrall's Did Six Million Really Die?, and works by Malcolm Ross.

By the early 1980s, Samisdat Publishers had grown into a worldwide distributor of Nazi and neo-Nazi posters, audiotapes, and memorabilia, as well as pamphlets and books devoted to Holocaust denial and what he claimed were Allied and Israeli war crimes. In 1981, he claimed that he was distributing literature in 14 languages to 45 different countries. He also claimed that he had a mailing list of 29,000 in the United States alone. Advertisement space for Samisdat Publishers was purchased in well-known reputable American magazines and even comic books. West Germany became another large market, in violation of West German Volksverhetzung (incitement of the masses) laws preventing Holocaust denial and dissemination of Nazi and neo-Nazi material, with Samisdat going so far as to send mass mailings to every member of the West German Bundestag (parliament).

In December 1980, the West German Federal Ministry of Finance told the Bundestag that between January 1978 and December 1979, "200 shipments of right-wing content, including books, periodicals, symbols, decorations, films, cassettes, and records" had been intercepted entering West Germany; these shipments "came overwhelmingly from Canada." On 23 April 1981, the West German government sent a letter to the Canadian Jewish Congress, confirming that the source of the material was Samisdat Publishers.

From 1981 to 1982, Zündel had his mailing privileges suspended by the Canadian government on the grounds that he had been using the mail to send hate propaganda, a criminal offence in Canada. Zündel then began shipping from a post office box in Niagara Falls, New York, until the ban on his mailing in Canada was lifted in January 1983. Under his pseudonym Christof Friedrich, he wrote a preface to Savitri Devi's esoteric neo-Nazi book The Lightning and the Sun. Under the same pseudonym, he also wrote various articles for George P. Dietz's neo-Nazi magazine Liberty Bell, and was a contributor and on the editorial staff of Dietz's other periodical, the White Power Report.

=== Trials in the 1980s ===
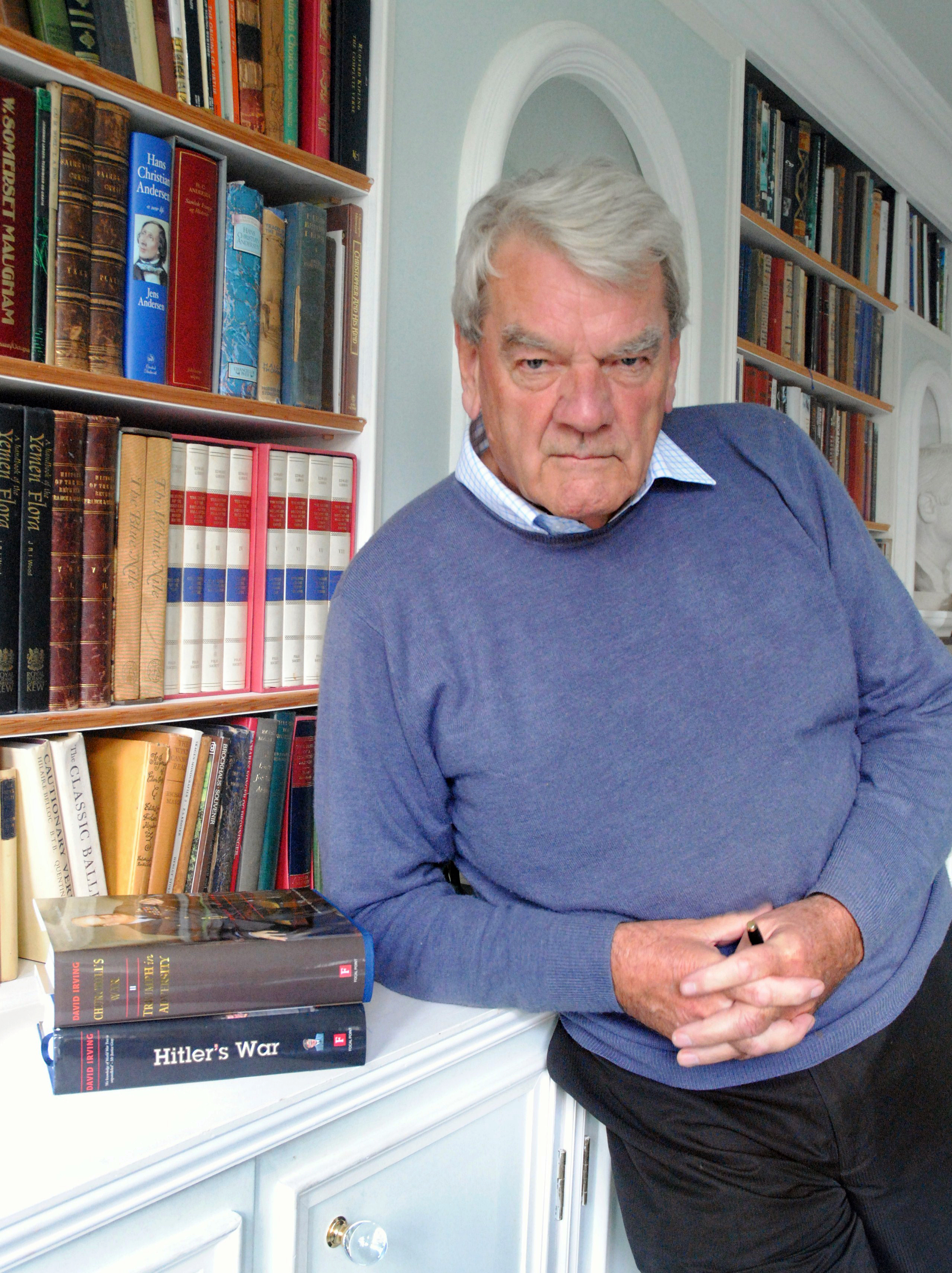
David Irving, whom Zündel met in 1986 and who helped Zündel in 1988 in his second trial for denying the Holocaust. Irving was himself jailed in Austria in 2005 for the same crime.

In 1983, Sabina Citron, a Holocaust survivor and founder of the Canadian Holocaust Remembrance Association, filed a private complaint against Zündel before the Canadian Human Rights Tribunal. In December of 1983, she filed a private criminal prosecution against Zundel for the crime of spreading false news, as set out in section 181 of Canada's Criminal Code. In 1984, the Ontario government joined the criminal proceedings against Zündel based on Citron's complaint.

Zündel underwent two criminal trials in 1985 and 1988. The charge against Zündel alleged that he "did publish a statement or tale, namely, Did Six Million Really Die? that he knows is false and that is likely to cause mischief to the public interest in social and racial tolerance, contrary to the Criminal Code". After a much publicized trial in 1985, Zündel was found guilty. One of the prosecution witnesses, Auschwitz survivor Arnold Friedman, a Holocaust educator in Toronto, testified that "prisoners marched off to the ovens never returned" to which Zündel's lawyer, Doug Christie, responded by asking "if those who disappeared might not have been led out a nearby gate".

His conviction was later overturned in an appeal on a legal technicality, leading to a second trial in 1988, in which he was again convicted, by a second jury.

The defence at the 1988 trial relied on testimony from Holocaust deniers David Irving and Fred A. Leuchter, a self-taught execution technician. Leuchter's testimony as an expert witness was accepted by the court on a very limited range of issues, and his accompanying Leuchter report was excluded, based on his lack of engineering credentials. He was allowed to testify only about what he saw on his trip to Auschwitz, and to compare what he saw with the execution technology that he worked with, but was ruled to have no qualifications to testify about toxicology or the construction of crematoria. In 1985, key expert testimony against Zündel's Holocaust denial was provided at great lengths by Holocaust historian Raul Hilberg, who refused to testify at Zündel's 1988 trial. Zündel was convicted in 1988 and sentenced to 15 months imprisonment by an Ontario court. However his conviction was overturned by the Supreme Court of Canada which held in 1992 that section 181 (formerly known as section 177) was a violation of the guarantee of freedom of expression under the Canadian Charter of Rights and Freedoms.

=== Other activities ===
In 1994, Zündel campaigned in Canada to ban the movie Schindler's List as "hate speech" and celebrated the movie being banned in Malaysia and effectively banned in Lebanon and Jordan.

On 8 May 1995, his Toronto residence was the target of an arson attack, resulting in $400,000 in damage. A group calling itself the "Jewish Armed Resistance Movement" claimed responsibility for the arson attack; according to the Toronto Sun, the group had ties to extremist organizations, including the Jewish Defense League and Kahane Chai. The leader of the Toronto wing of the Jewish Defense League, Meir Weinstein (known then as Meir Halevi), denied involvement in the attack; however, five days later, Weinstein and American JDL leader Irv Rubin were caught trying to break into the Zündel property, where they were apprehended by police. No charges were ever filed in the incident. Weeks after the fire, Zündel was targeted with a parcel bomb that was detonated by the Toronto Police bomb squad. The investigation into the parcel bomb attack led to charges being laid against David Barbarash, an animal rights activist based in British Columbia, but they were eventually stayed.

== Canadian Human Rights Commission; first departure from Canada ==
In 1997, Zündel's marriage with his second wife, Irene Marcarelli, ended after 18 months. She subsequently testified against him in the late 1990s when he was under investigation by the Canadian Human Rights Commission for promoting hatred against Jews via his website. In January 2000, before the commission had completed its hearings, he left Canada for Sevierville, Tennessee, in the US, where he married his third wife, Ingrid Rimland, and vowed never to return to Canada. Rimland, described as "a pioneering voice of the neo-Nazi Internet", created and managed Zundel's website.

== Detention, deportation, and imprisonment ==
=== Deportation from the United States ===
In 2003, Zündel was arrested by the United States government for violating immigration rules, specifically visa waiver overstay, which he argued was a trumped up charge. After two weeks he was deported to Canada, where he was immediately jailed. A warrant for his arrest for Volksverhetzung (incitement of the masses) had been issued in Germany, where he remained a citizen, in the same year. At his hearing, Zündel described himself as "the Gandhi of the right".

=== Detention and deportation from Canada ===
Although Zündel lived in Canada for more than 40 years prior to moving to the United States, he never gained Canadian citizenship. Applications for citizenship were rejected in 1966 and 1994 for undisclosed reasons. On his return to Canada, he had no status in the country as he was not a citizen and as his landed immigrant status had been forfeited by his prolonged absence from the country. When returning to Canada, Zündel claimed refugee status in hopes of preventing his deportation to Germany. This claim elicited public ridicule; Rex Murphy, a columnist for The Globe and Mail and a well-known commentator on the Canadian Broadcasting Corporation, wrote, "If Ernst Zündel is a refugee, Daffy Duck is Albert Einstein ... Some propositions are so ludicrous that they are a betrayal of common sense and human dignity if allowed a moment's oxygen."

On May 2, 2003, Canadian Citizenship and Immigration Minister Denis Coderre and Solicitor General Wayne Easter issued a "national security certificate" against Zündel under the provisions of the Canadian Immigration and Refugee Protection Act, indicating that he was a threat to Canada's national security owing to his alleged links with violent neo-Nazi groups, including Aryan Nations leader Richard Girnt Butler, neo-Nazi Christian Worch, and former Canadian Aryan Nations leader Terry Long, as well as Ewald Althans, convicted in a German court in 1995 of charges that included insulting the memory of the dead and insulting the state.

Zündel moved twice to have Canadian Federal Court justice Pierre Blais recuse himself from the case for "badgering and accusing the witness of lying" and exhibiting "open hostility" towards Zündel, and filed two constitutional challenges, one in the Ontario courts and one in the federal courts, both unsuccessful. During the hearing, Zündel characterized his position as "Sometimes I feel like a black man being convicted on Ku Klux Klan news clippings."

Zündel meanwhile moved to be released from detention on his own recognizance while the legal proceedings were ongoing. His lawyer, Doug Christie, introduced as a "surprise witness" Lorraine Day, a California doctor who practiced alternative cancer treatments, to testify that Zündel's incarceration at Toronto's Toronto West Detention Centre was causing his chest tumor (revealed to the court a few weeks previously) to grow and his blood pressure to rise, that the medication supplied to control his blood pressure was causing side effects such as a slow heart rate and loss of memory, and that he needed "exercise, fresh air, and freedom from stress. The whole point is we need to have his high blood pressure controlled without the drug." On January 21, 2004, after three months of hearings including both public and secret testimony, Justice Blais again ruled against Zündel with a damning statement.

During his imprisonment, Canadian right-wing leader Paul Fromm attempted to hold numerous rallies in support of Zündel, both in Ontario and in Alberta. The rallies were met with formidable opposition, namely by the Anti-Racist Action group, which heightened its opposition to Fromm's pro-Zündel work in the summer of 2004. The anti-racist efforts included participation by numerous Toronto activist groups and individuals, including Shane Ruttle Martinez and Marcell Rodden, and successfully managed to prevent similar future congregations of the neo-Nazis. Fromm eventually ceased his efforts after being advised by Zündel's attorneys that public clashes between supporters and opponents of Zündel were not assisting the image of their client's case.

On February 24, 2005, Justice Blais ruled that Canada could deport Zündel back to Germany at any time, and on February 25, Zündel's lawyer, Peter Lindsay, announced that his client would not attempt to obtain a stay against the deportation and that his fight to remain in Canada was over. In his decision, Justice Blais noted that Zündel had had the opportunity to respond to the allegations of the decision of January 21 by explaining the nature of his contacts with the extremists mentioned and/or providing exonerating witnesses, but had failed to do so. Blais found that "Mr. Zündel's activities are not only a threat to Canada's national security, but also a threat to the international community of nations."

Zündel was deported to Germany on March 1, 2005. Upon his arrival at Frankfurt airport, he was immediately arrested and detained in Mannheim prison awaiting trial for inciting racial hatred. In 2007, Zündel's appeal to the UN Human Rights Committee against deportation was rejected, partly for his failure to exhaust all domestic remedies through a thorough defence as required by its charter, and partly because the committee ruled the case inadmissible as it did not find his rights had been violated.

=== Trial and imprisonment in Germany ===
German prosecutors charged Zündel on July 19, 2005, with 14 counts of inciting racial hatred, which is punishable under German penal code, Section 130, 2.(3) with up to 5 years in prison. The indictment stated Zündel "denied the fate of destruction for the Jews planned by National Socialist powerholders and justified this by saying that the mass destruction in Auschwitz and Treblinka, among others, were an invention of the Jews and served the repression and extortion of the German people."

His trial was scheduled for five days beginning November 8, 2005, but ran into an early delay when Judge Ulrich Meinerzhagen ruled that lawyer Horst Mahler could not be part of the defence team, as his licence to practise law had been withdrawn in 2004 and he had been sentenced in January 2005 to nine months in prison for inciting racial hatred. Mahler had been associated with the violent far-left Red Army Faction in the 1970s, but had since become a supporter of far-right and antisemitic groups. Zündel's public defender Sylvia Stolz was also dismissed on the grounds that her written submissions to the court included Mahler's ideas. On November 15, 2005, Meinerzhagen announced that the trial was to be rescheduled to allow new counsel time to prepare.

The trial resumed on February 9, 2006, for several court sessions but then adjourned on March 9 when the trial judge asked for Sylvia Stolz to be removed as Zündel's defence lawyer after she repeatedly disrupted the trial and had to be dragged out of the court by two bailiffs. Stolz signed "Heil Hitler" on court motions, said the Holocaust was "the biggest lie in world history," and yelled that the judge deserved the death penalty for "offering succour to the enemy". In 2008, Stolz was sentenced to three-and-a-half years in prison and stripped of her licence to practice law for five years.

The trial again resumed on June 9, 2006, and continued, intermittently, into early 2007. The prosecution concluded its case on January 26, 2007, calling for Zündel to be handed the maximum sentence of five years' imprisonment with state prosecutor Andreas Grossman calling him a "political con man" from whom the German people needed protection. After quoting extensively from Zündel's writings on the Holocaust, Grossman argued "[you] might as well argue that the sun rises in the West ... But you cannot change that the Holocaust has been proven." In its closing arguments the defence called for Zündel to be acquitted. One of Zündel's lawyers, Jürgen Rieger, a leading member of Germany's NPD, was forbidden to voice petitions and ruled to put them down in writing; he let another lawyer read them aloud. Another lawyer read parts of Mein Kampf and parts of the NS race legislation aloud in his closing speech. Zündel asked for the inception of an expert's commission to examine the Holocaust. The judge in his emotional closing speech called Zündel a "Brunnenvergifter und Brandstifter, einen Verehrer dieses menschenverachtenden Barbaren Adolf Hitler, von dem er dummdreist daherschwafelt" ("well-poisoner and arsonist, an admirer of this human-despising barbarian Adolf Hitler, of whom he rambles on with brash impertinence").

On February 15, 2007, Zündel was sentenced to five years in prison, the maximum sentence possible for violating the Volksverhetzung law in the German penal code which bans incitement of hatred against a minority of the population, which is how his Holocaust denial was interpreted by the Federal German court.

His time in pre-trial confinement in Canada was not taken into account on his sentence, but only the two years he was confined in Germany since 2005. Holocaust deniers used Zündel's trial to claim that freedom of speech was impaired in Germany, depending on the ideology of the speaker.

=== Release from prison ===
Zündel was released on March 1, 2010, five years after his deportation to Germany. Following the end of his prison term, Canadian Minister of Public Safety Vic Toews reiterated that Zündel would not be permitted to return to Canada. "In 2005, a Federal Court judge confirmed that Zündel is inadmissible on security grounds for being a danger to the security of Canada", Toews said in a written statement, adding that, "The decision reinforced the government of Canada's position that this country will not be a safe haven for individuals who pose a risk to Canada's national security."

Zündel returned to his childhood home in the Black Forest, which had been vacant since his mother's death in the 1990s, and lived there until his own death.

=== Barred from entering the United States ===
On March 31, 2017, the U.S. Department of Homeland Security Administrative Appeals Office ruled Zündel inadmissible to the United States, rejecting his application for an immigrant visa which he had sought in order to be reunited with his wife. He was classified as inadmissible, because he has been convicted of foreign crimes for which the sentence was five years or more and a waiver deemed unwarranted due to Zündel's "history of inciting racial, ethnic, and religious hatred". Legal writer and law professor Eugene Volokh expressed the opinion that while his exclusion from the United States on hate speech grounds was not a violation of the First Amendment, it may have been an incorrect application of immigration law.

== UFOlogy ==
When Zündel started Samisdat Publishers in the 1970s, he became interested in ufology when the subject was at its peak of worldwide attention. His main offerings were his own books claiming that flying saucers were secret weapons developed by the Third Reich and now based in Antarctica.

Under the pseudonyms Christof Friedrich and Mattern Friedrich, Zündel also wrote several publications promoting the idea that UFOs were craft developed by German scientists who had fled to New Swabia, Antarctica. These titles include "Secret Nazi Polar Expeditions" (1978) and "Hitler at the South Pole" (1979). He promoted the idea of Nazi secret bases in Antarctica, Nazi UFOs, secret polar bases and Hollow Earth theories.

Along with Willibald Mattern, a German émigré living in Santiago, Chile, Zündel also wrote UFOs: Nazi Secret Weapon? on Nazi UFOs.

It is not clear whether Zündel really believed these theories or whether they were merely speculative fiction.

In the Samisdat Publishers newsletter of 1978, Zündel advertised an expedition to Antarctica to find these bases and UFOs. A ticket would cost $9,999 for a seat on an exploration team to locate the polar entrance to the hollow earth. This expedition never took place.

According to Frank Miele, a member of The Skeptics Society in the United States, Zündel told him that his book UFOs: Nazi Secret Weapon? (which became an underground bestseller, going through several printings) was nothing more than popular fiction to build publicity for Samisdat. Zündel said in a telephone conversation with Miele: "I realized that North Americans were not interested in being educated. They want to be entertained. The book was for fun. With a picture of the Führer on the cover and flying saucers coming out of Antarctica it was a chance to get on radio and TV talk shows. For about 15 minutes of an hour program I'd talk about that esoteric stuff. Then I would start talking about all those Jewish scientists in concentration camps, working on these secret weapons. And that was my chance to talk about what I wanted to talk about." "In that case," [Miele] asked him, "do you still stand by what you wrote in the UFO book?" "Look," he replied, "it has a question mark at the end of the title." Zündel continued to defend these views as late as 2002.

== Death ==
Zündel died at his home in Germany, of a heart attack, on August 5, 2017. He was survived by two children, and his widow Ingrid Rimland, who died on October 12, 2017.

== Bibliography ==
- Mattern, Willibald; Freidrich, Christof (1974). UFOs: Nazi Secret Weapon?. Toronto: Samisdat Publishers.
- Friedrich, Christof; Thomson, Eric (1977). The Hitler We Loved & Why. Reedy: White Power Publications.
- Friedrich, Christof (1977). Secret Nazi Polar Expeditions: Germany's Antartic Claim. Toronto: Samisdat Publishers.
- Zündel, Ernst (1980). Hitler am Südpol? (in German). Toronto: Samisdat Publishers.

== See also ==
- Neo-Nazism in Canada
