= Herbert Romerstein =

American historian

- Born: August 19, 1931; Brooklyn, New York
- Died: May 7, 2013 (aged 81); Clinton, Maryland
- Occupations: ex-communist, federal government employee, historian, author
- Movement: Anti-communism
- Spouse: Pat Romerstein
- Children: 4
- Relatives: William Romerstein (brother)

Herbert "Herb" Romerstein (August 19, 1931 – May 7, 2013) was an American ex-communist and historian who became a writer specializing in anticommunism and was appointed Director of the U.S. Information Agency’s Office to Counter Soviet Disinformation and Active Measures. As an author he is best known for his book The Venona Secrets (written with Eric Breindel).

== Background ==
Herbert Romerstein was born in 1931 in Brooklyn, New York into the Jewish family of Sam (1883 – 6 October 1946) and Rose (29 March 1909 – 27 March 1970) Romerstein. Two years after his cheder, while still in high school in Brooklyn he joined the Communist Party USA.

== Career ==
Romerstein worked for anticommunist newsletter Counterattack

Romerstein gained employment with C. Ludwig Baumann, "a retail furniture establishment."

In 1949, as the Truman administration continued its crackdown on communists, the party's denials that it had ever intended to overthrow the US "knocked the props from under all my teaching... Stop this shilly-shallying, I yelled at one of my party bosses." During the Korean War, Romerstein left the party for accusing South Korea of attacking North Korea, and he fought in that war.

In September 1950, Romerstein had become a research analyst and investigator for American Business Consultants, publishers of the anticommunist newsletter Counterattack as well as for Bookmailer, which published his first book, Communism and Your Child, in 1962.

On April 12, 1951, Romerstein, at "19 1/2", testified before the Senate Sub-Committee on Internal Security regarding Communist infiltration into the American Communications Association and United Office and Professional Workers (now Retail, Wholesale and Department Store Union, or RWDSU). The same year, he also testified before the Subversive Activities Control Board.

From 1965 to 1983, Romerstein served as a staff member for the US House of Representatives and worked as investigator for the House Committee on Un-American Activities (HUAC), as minority chief investigator for the House Committee on Internal Security, and on the staff of the House Permanent Select Committee on Intelligence.

In 1983, he joined the Reagan administration full-time as a director of the Office to Counter Soviet Disinformation at the U.S. Information Agency. He served in this capacity until President Reagan left office in 1989.

Thereafter, he became director of the Center for Security Research at the Education and Research Institute (ERI). ERI's board members include Ralph Bennett, M. Stanton Evans, Patrick Korten, James C. Roberts, Allan H. Ryskind, and Terrence M. Scanlon. Later, he worked at the Institute of World Politics as a specialist on espionage, Soviet political warfare, international terrorism, and internal security.

He conducted research in both U.S. and foreign archives, such as the Ukrainian archives in 1992 and the archives of the Communist International in Moscow, Russia, in 1993.

In 1992, Romerstein and Ray Kerrison reported in the New York Post that Oleg Kalugin had identified I. F. Stone as a Soviet agent, developed in The Venona Secrets, co-authored with Eric Breindel.

Romerstein defined counterpropaganda as "carefully prepared answers to false propaganda with the purpose of refuting the disinformation and undermining the propagandist."

== Personal life and death ==
Romerstein was married to Pat Romerstein. He moved to Clinton, Maryland, in the early 1970s.

Romerstein died on May 7, 2013, age 81.

He was buried on May 9, 2013, at the Mount Lebanon Cemetery in Adelphi, Maryland.

== Legacy ==
In January 2013, the Hoover Institution Library and Archives at Stanford University acquired his collection of papers. According to the archive, after being processed and registered the Romerstein papers will be Hoover's largest collection on communist subversion and the activities of communist front organizations, complementing its previous holdings of papers of the Subversive Activities Control Board and William T. Poole.

== Works ==
=== Books ===
- Communism and Your Child. New York: Bookmailer (1962).
- Communist International Youth and Student Apparatus. Washington, D.C.: U.S. Government Printing Office (1963).

"A monograph prepared for the Subcommittee to Investigate the Administration of the Internal Security Act and Other Internal Security Laws of the Committee on the Judiciary, United States Senate."

- Official Guide to Confederate Money & Civil War Tokens, Tradesmen & Patriotic, with Grover Criswell. New York: HC Publishers (1971).
- Soviet Support for International Terrorism. Washington, D.C.: Foundation for Democratic Education (1981).
- The World Peace Council and Soviet "Active Measures". Washington, D.C.: The Hale Foundation (1983). ISBN 0935067019, 978-0935067019.
- Grenada Documents: An Overview and Selection. Washington, D.C.: U.S. Government Printing Office (1984).
- Soviet Active Measures and Propaganda: "New Thinking" & Influence Activities in the Gorbachev Era. Toronto: Mackenzie Institute for the Study of Terrorism, Revolution, and Propaganda (1989).
- The KGB Against the 'Main Enemy': How the Soviet Intelligence Service Operates against the United States, with Stanislav Levchenko. Lexington, MA: Lexington Books (1989).
- The KGB Enters the 1990s. Alexandria, VA: Center for Intelligence Studies (1990).
- Soviet Agents of Influence. Intelligence Issues Series No. 3. Alexandria, VA: Center for Intelligence Studies (1991).
- Heroic Victims: Stalin's Foreign Legion in the Spanish Civil War. Washington, D.C.: Council for the Defense of Freedom (1994).
- The Venona Secrets: Exposing Soviet Espionage and America's Traitors, with Eric Breindel. Washington, D.C.: Regnery Publishing (2000).
- Historical Dictionary of American Propaganda, with Martin Manning. Westport, CT: Greenwood Press (2004).
- Stalin's Secret Agents: The Subversion of Roosevelt's Government, with M. Stanton Evans. Old Saybrook, CT: Tantor Media (2012).

=== Articles and essays ===
- "I Was a Kid Communist" (3-part article). New York Daily Mirror (ca. 1962)
- "The Campaign Against Anti-Communism." National Review (February 12, 1963), p. 108.
- "American Friends of the Vietcong." National Review (April 6, 1965), pp. 278–281.
- "A Transnational Threat." National Review (November 25, 1977), pp. 1364–1366.
- "Stalin's Day of Infamy: The Soviet-Nazi Pact Was Responsible for World War?" Policy Review (Summer 1989), pp. 58–61.
- "'The Attack on I.F. Stone': An Exchange." New York Review of Books (1992), p. 49.
  - In response to "The Attack on I.F. Stone" by Andrew Brown in New York Review of Books (October 8, 1992).
- "Hiss: Still Guilty," with Eric Breindel. The New Republic, vol. 215, no. 27 (December 30, 1996), pp. 12–14.
- "Disinformation as a KGB Weapon in the Cold War." Journal of Intelligence History, vol. 1, no. 1 (Summer 2001), pp. 54–67. doi:10.1080/16161262.2001.10555046.
- "Can we win the war against terrorism?" Institute of World Politics (October 29, 2002).
- "Axis of Evil Acts Up." Human Events (February 24, 2003).
- "Cuba Belongs in Axis of Evil." Human Events (May 23, 2003).
- "Tricks of the Terror Trade." Institute of World Politics (July 21, 2003).
- "Impediments to effective counterintelligence and counterterrorism." Institute of World Politics (October 3, 2003).
- "Who 'Blew' Mrs. Wilson's Cover?" Human Events (October 10, 2003).
- "Ted Kennedy Was a 'Collaborationist.'" Human Events (December 5, 2003).
- "The spy who saved Poland." Institute of World Politics (February 26, 2004).
- "Professor warned not to abolish police intelligence units – in 1977." Institute of World Politics (March 17, 2004)
- "Why we could not connect the dots before 9/11." Institute of World Politics (April 18, 2004).
- "Tricks of the Terror Trade." Institute of World Politics (July 21, 2004).
- "Divide and Conquer: The KGB Disinformation Campaign Against Ukrainians and Jews." Institute of World Politics (Dec. 1, 2004).
- "Aspects of World War II History Revealed through 'ISCOT' Radio Intercepts." Journal of Intelligence History (Summer 2005).
- "Like Old Times, KGB Murders Continue." Human Events (Dec. 1, 2006).
- "Katyn Murder Cover-up." Institute of World Politics (Mar. 3, 2008).
- "Strategic Influence: Public Diplomacy, Counterpropaganda, and Political Warfare." Institute of World Politics (2009).

== See also ==
- Venona
- Anti-communism
- Counterattack (newsletter)
- Alger Hiss
- Whittaker Chambers
