= U.S. intelligence involvement with German and Japanese war criminals after World War II =

While the United States was involved in the prosecution of people involved in the war crimes of World War II, US military and intelligence agencies protected some war criminals in the interest of obtaining technical or intelligence information from them, or to recruit them for intelligence work. The relationships with German war criminals started immediately after the end of the Second World War, but some of the relationships with Japanese war criminals were slower to develop.

The concealment was not always deliberate, as some records were scattered among a huge volume of government records. In some cases, prosecutors actively developed cases against individuals, yet were unaware the US had recruited them. The US Congress instituted the Nazi War Crimes and Japanese Imperial Government Records Interagency Working Group, under the auspices of the National Archives and Records Administration, to investigate the issue. Many of these relationships were formed by the Counter-Intelligence Corps (CIC) before the creation of the CIA in 1947. The CIA took over the relationships and, in some cases, concealed them for nearly 60 years.

== Containment and anticommunism ==
Several doctrines affected the postwar policy under which these relationships were formed, although not all historians agree that all applied. Containment, general anti-Communism, and so called McCarthyism were generally accepted.

Containment, as a concept in US foreign policy after World War II, was intellectually given support by George F. Kennan, first in an internal document called "the long telegram" and then the "X article" in Foreign Affairs, "The Sources of Soviet Conduct" published under the pseudonym "X". While Kennan advocated a nuanced implementation of limiting Soviet options, US policy became increasingly absolutist: that which was bad for communism was good, and preventing modifications of democratic capitalism was considered important enough to justify co-work with war criminals.

The actions of Senator Joe McCarthy, however, were more reflexively anti-communist. The mere accusation of communism was often sufficient grounds to act against individuals or organizations.

== Searching for order or opportunities? ==
According to Kisatsky, Byroade's comment, that only by "[convincing] the Germans that they are equals" could the United States "retain . . . power" and achieve its global objectives. showed that U.S.-German policy, in a broader policy of Atlantic politics, had multiple dimensions and multiple time periods. During Allied occupation (1945–55), Denazification helped remove totalitarian practices and promote democracy. Post occupation (1955-1990), "Allied leaders could best ensure the Federal Republic's allegiance to the West by granting full autonomy and by treating West Germans as equals", thus alleviating resentment of occupation. While economic and limitary integration with the rest of Europe "minimized risk of a third World War by enhancing mutual interdependence among the major Continental states." Post German reunification in 1990, cooperative Allied-German relations facilitated progress and enabled the United States to "retain power" in Europe.

Within the US government, and by its critics, was a constant debate between absolute morality and the perceived needs of realpolitik with respect to communists and allies. Elizabeth Holtzman, a former US Congresswoman from New York and member of the Nazi War Crimes and Japanese Imperial Government Records Interagency Working Group, said the documents showed that the CIA "failed to lift a finger" to hunt Eichmann and "force us to confront not only the moral harm but the practical harm" of relying on intelligence from ex-Nazis. According to Holtzman, information from the former Nazis was often tainted both by their "personal agendas" and their vulnerability to blackmail. "Using bad people can have very bad consequences," Holtzman said. She and other group members suggested that the findings should be a cautionary tale for intelligence agencies today."

== Evaluating the intelligence process ==
Timothy Naftali and others have suggested that a useful, if amoral choice, is to consider whether the results of the use of tainted resources produced good results, saying "it's healthy for a society to have the tools to evaluate the performance of its intelligence community -- even if the performance involves activities that are 50 years old. And I would also hope that the intelligence community itself will take lessons from the past. "

Hans-Georg Wieck, head of the German BND intelligence organization between 1985 and 1990, commented that "with the disclosure of documents on the U.S. Army's and the CIA's relationships with Gehlen, the downside of that cooperation has become known. The upside-the quality of the intelligence project-remains undisclosed. Hence even with righteous, detached hindsight, a cost-benefit analysis of hiring Gehlen and his people remains far more difficult to make, even today, than Naftali thinks. He concedes that contacts with unsavory characters sometimes prove beneficial. This was the case with Gehlen's organization."

== European Policy ==
=== Gehlen Organization ===
Much of the immediate postwar activity, until the mid-fifties when it became part of West Germany's BND intelligence agency, was the Gehlen Organization. Reinhard Gehlen approached US Army intelligence shortly after the end of the war, and offered his files and staff on the Eastern Front and Soviet Union. Gehlen himself was not considered to be a war criminal, but some of his staff may have been.

Gehlen originally had an excellent reputation in intelligence, but recent information has brought this into question. At the GHI symposium, Michael Wala, managing editor of the German publication, Journal of Intelligence History, said Gehlen was assumed to have transformed German intelligence during the war. Wala, however, said it was less that Gehlen was so good as a Soviet analyst, but that his predecessors, prior to his taking over the Fremde Heere Ost (FHO, English "Foreign Armies East") had been so bad. Prior to 1942, Nazi racism caused FHO to deprecate Soviet strength and equipment, such as the T-34, widely believed to be the best tank of the Second World War. Even though Gehlen was not able to keep Nazi ideology out of estimates, leading to such things as a failure to predict the Soviet resistance at Stalingrad, he remained highly regarded by the Oberkommando der Wehrmacht (OKW, English: High Command of the Armed Forces).

Timothy Naftali devalues the early postwar cooperation between the CIA and what became West Germany's BND. According to Naftali, Gehlen's organization and its successor, the BND, was of "questionable" value and that "CIA records show that Gehlen was insubordinate, his organization was insecure, and the entire operation provided intelligence of questionable value. Fifty years later, the German government still refuses to declassify its own records on the subject. Until it does, and unless those documents paint a dramatically new picture of the situation, the account of the Gehlen organization in the early Cold War will remain damning."

According to Wieck, the Gehlen Organization may have recruited up to 100 former SS men who may have been guilty of war crimes. Critchfield, the US liaison with Gehlen from 1948 to 1956, "had in mind a good greater than intelligence collection: assuring that the security elite of the new German state would be firmly Atlanticist. This contributed in no small way both to the development of mutual trust between the Federal Republic of Germany and the United States and to the preclusion of a domestic neofascist or nationalist threat to the former." Schmitz, a member of Critchfield's staff from 1949 to 1954, and his deputy in 1953 and 1954, said "the implication is that these former SS personnel-indeed, all former SS personnel-were unexposed war criminals and, as such, were subject to blackmail by the Soviets."

=== Planning Stay-Behind Networks ===
Alongside the Gehlen Organisation, CIC had set up stay-behind networks in West Germany, who were supposed to stay put in the event of a Soviet invasion and transmit intelligence from behind enemy lines, some of which included ex-Nazis. Most of the networks were dismantled in the early 1950s.

One example was an apparent equivalent to the East German Freie Deutsche Jugend (Free German Youth), the Bund Deutscher Jugend (BDJ, League of German Youth) seemed, at first, to be a youth group that countered Communist movements. Its increasing militancy and secretiveness about its financing, however, brought it to the attention of Georg August Zinn, the Socialist Minister President of Hesse. Zinn discovered that BDJ was US-funded, and inside BDJ was a covert operations service, Technischer Dienst ("Technical Service") made up of former German officers, some Nazis and SS men, between 35 and 50 years old. Their mission was to wage guerilla warfare against a Soviet invasion. "The BDJ affair demonstrated that at least some agencies of the U.S. government willingly worked with undemocratic elements in service to American power."

After Zinn's presentation, the US High Commissioner for Germany (HICOG), Walter J. Donnelly, asked the West German government and Socialist Party to join in a U.S.-German investigation of the whole affair: "Let's get to the bottom of this. Let the chips fall where they may." Donelley and the United States Department of State were correct in that senior HICOG personnel had refused to meet with BDJ. John J. McCloy, the previous HICOG, refused to meet with BDJ, but US intelligence organized BDJ after becoming concerned by the invasion of Korea. US intelligence seemed to have been unaware of the BDJ blacklist and tried, too late, to denounce it and avoid Soviet propaganda. The Communists, however, termed it a proof of US-Nazi conspiracy.

=== CIA name file analysis ===
A CIA document, dated 19 March 1958, from the Munich station chief to headquarters, stated that German intelligence had provided a list of former Nazis and their locations. Eichmann was third on the list. The memo passed on a rumour that he was in Jerusalem "despite the fact that he was responsible for mass extermination of Jews", but also states, matter-of-factly: "He is reported to have lived in Argentina under the alias Clemens since 1952." There is no record of a follow-up in the CIA to this tip-off.

When Eichmann was captured the CIA combed files it had captured from the Nazis to find information that might be useful to the Israeli prosecution. The results caused near panic among the CIA's leadership because, unknown to the junior staff who had looked through the files, a few of Eichmann's accomplices being investigated had been CIA "assets", and who might be discovered through Soviet knowledge of the Israeli prosecution records.

==== Heinz Felfe ====
The recruitment of Heinz Felfe, an SS officer who rose through the ranks of West Germany's Gehlen organization to become its counterintelligence chief in 1955 did not only raise questions of ethics, but produced a major security failure. In 1961, Felfe was identified as a Soviet spy who was very familiar with CIA operations in Eastern Europe, which put him in position to sabotage a CIA operations against the KGB base in East Germany. The CIA subsequently estimated that Felfe had compromised 15,000 items

==== Handling Nazis outside Germany ====
Erhard Dabringhaus, a U.S. Army (CIC) intelligence officer in post-war Germany from 1946 to 1952 (i.e., the year that the OPC clandestine service was brought under CIA control), and later a language professor at Detroit's Wayne State University, was Klaus Barbie's case officer. Dabringhaus said he was ordered to house and pay Barbie, and did inform his command of Barbie's past actions. In 1951, Barbie turned up in Genoa, Italy, before escaping to Bolivia with documents issued by the International Committee of the Red Cross.

According to Bill Moyers, Barbie worked with ex-Nazi Germans reporting on the Soviets. Once his work was done, the US did not turn him over to the French, but helped him escape, via Italy, to Bolivia. An analysis of Barbie's U.S. Army file, by the IWG, recounted that in May 1949, the French Ministry of Interior pressed the U.S. military government of Germany, HICOG, for Barbie's extradition. The CIC, however, was concerned both that Barbie knew too much about CIC espionage networks, but also about the adverse publicity if it became known he had been recruited. From the HICOG file,

To have exposed BARBIE to interrogation and public trial would not have been in consonance with accepted clandestine intelligence operational doctrine. . . . [H]e was knowledgeable of high level operations and operational procedures, which would have been compromised. Through procedures in effect at that time, BARBIE was therefor [sic] assisted in 1951 in leaving Europe for resettlement. U.S. Army Intelligence has had no further contact with BARBIE subsequent to his departure from Europe.

CIC arranged for Barbie to reach South America through Italy. Barbie, using an alias but otherwise living openly in Bolivia, was extradited to France in 1983. While in Bolivia, he was also a security advisor to Alfredo Stroessner, President of Paraguay from 1954 to 1989. The United States Attorney General ordered the Office of Special Investigations of the United States Department of Justice to produce an investigative report. Alan Ryan, outgoing head of OSI, detailed the use by U.S. intelligence of Barbie, including his escape using a line that included assistance from a Croatian priest in the Vatican. Ryan concluded that "no other case was found where a suspected Nazi war criminal was placed in the rat line, or where the rat line was used to evacuate a person wanted…" But, he did find, "that officers of the CIC engaged in obstruction of justice… although prosecution is moot because of the statute of limitations"

Weitzman referred to a 22 May 1999 report, in The Times, which painted a much larger scope. It cited Dabringhaus as personally having recruited hundreds of Nazis, operating at least into the 1960s. Some SS men may have worked for the CIA in Latin America, and may have taught methods of torture.

== Pacific Policy ==
General Douglas MacArthur essentially banned the OSS from his South West Pacific Area (SWPA), while OSS simply was less relevant to the naval and "island hopping" operations in Fleet Admiral Chester Nimitz's Pacific Ocean Area theater. Since there was no postwar alliance to be preserved for US intelligence, there were few reasons to keep matters classified due to the sensitivities of a key ally. While the US did work with Australia and New Zealand, MacArthur had essentially subordinated their commands.

The number and types of Japanese who formed relationships with U.S. intelligence differ from their Nazi counterparts. The Japanese were fewer in number than the Germans who were directly to collect HUMINT from the Soviets or take part in stay-behind networks after invasion. Some of the Japanese were imprisoned for investigation, or actually served prison time for war crimes, perhaps being released early. Far more of the Japanese were later at a much higher level of authority than were the Germans.

=== U.S. intelligence conflict in postwar Japan ===
Until his relief, MacArthur used his own intelligence organization, G-2, headed by Major General Charles A. Willoughby, a confidante of MacArthur. Immediately after the war, Japanese ex-officers and nationalists created an informal network intended to preserve, as far as possible, the Imperial system and eventually to re-establish the military.

Most US contacts with the underground groups were combat rather than intelligence specialists. Most of the links established by U.S. authorities to the Japanese underground groups, were to high ranking officers with operational and combat experience. Another significant intelligence specialist, with an extensive network of contacts among officers, was Lieutenant General Kawabe Torashiro. Kawabe joined with Arisue in providing the services of former Japanese Army personnel to occupation authorities, particularly G-2. Kawabe's last headquarters assignment gave him informal authority over many groups and individuals within the army. His network was made up primarily of former high-ranking army general staff members and their subordinates. These individuals were in networks of subordinate organizations, called kikan, that would carry out actual operations.

In one important case, that of Shirō Ishii, the intelligence cooperation was not for shaping the political destiny of postwar Japan or for obtaining future intelligence, but as a trade of immunity for technical data.

=== Japanese who worked with US intelligence ===
A variety of relationships existed, first with G-2 and then with the CIA. Characteristic of the G-2 relationships was a significant amount of delegation of both planning and execution to Japanese, since SCAP did not itself have the manpower for detailed monitoring, nor would it work with CIA in the theater or in the US.

After his rehabilitation in 1950, Masanobu Tsuji received U.S. funding through the G-2's Historical Branch under Willoughby. Through Arisue, G-2 recruited and employed some 200 former Japanese officers to assist historian Gordon Prange's work on the history of MacArthur's Pacific campaign. A central figure in this effort was Colonel Hattori Takushiro. One of the most important members of the Hattori kikan, known in some CIA documents as "Willoughby's Stable," was Hattori's close friend Tsuji Masanobu.

The key individual in the "undergrounds" was Lieutenant General Arisue Seizo, chief of the intelligence department at Imperial General Headquarters at the end of the war. Shortly before the end of the war, Arisue began collecting intelligence documents to use as a bargaining chip with the Occupation. SCAP sentiment toward Arisue was mixed, and officers outside G-2 considered indicting Arisue as a Class A war criminal. Willoughby, however, had met and liked Lieutenant General Kawabe Torashiro who had been head of intelligence for the Kwantung Army, military attaché to Berlin, deputy chief of staff for Imperial GHQ, and the leader of the surrender delegation to Manila.

Willoughby asked Arisue, in September 1945, to set up a domestic intelligence network to warn of a potential Communist coup. Willoughby was unaware that Arisue and some of his associates, at various times, considered right-wing coups against the Japanese government.

Other prominent individuals who worked with US intelligence include Nobusuke Kishi, Shirō Ishii, Kaya Okinori, Kodama Yoshio, Tsuji Matsunobui, Takushiro Hattori and Ryuzo Sejima.
