= Instauration =

American magazine (1975–2000)

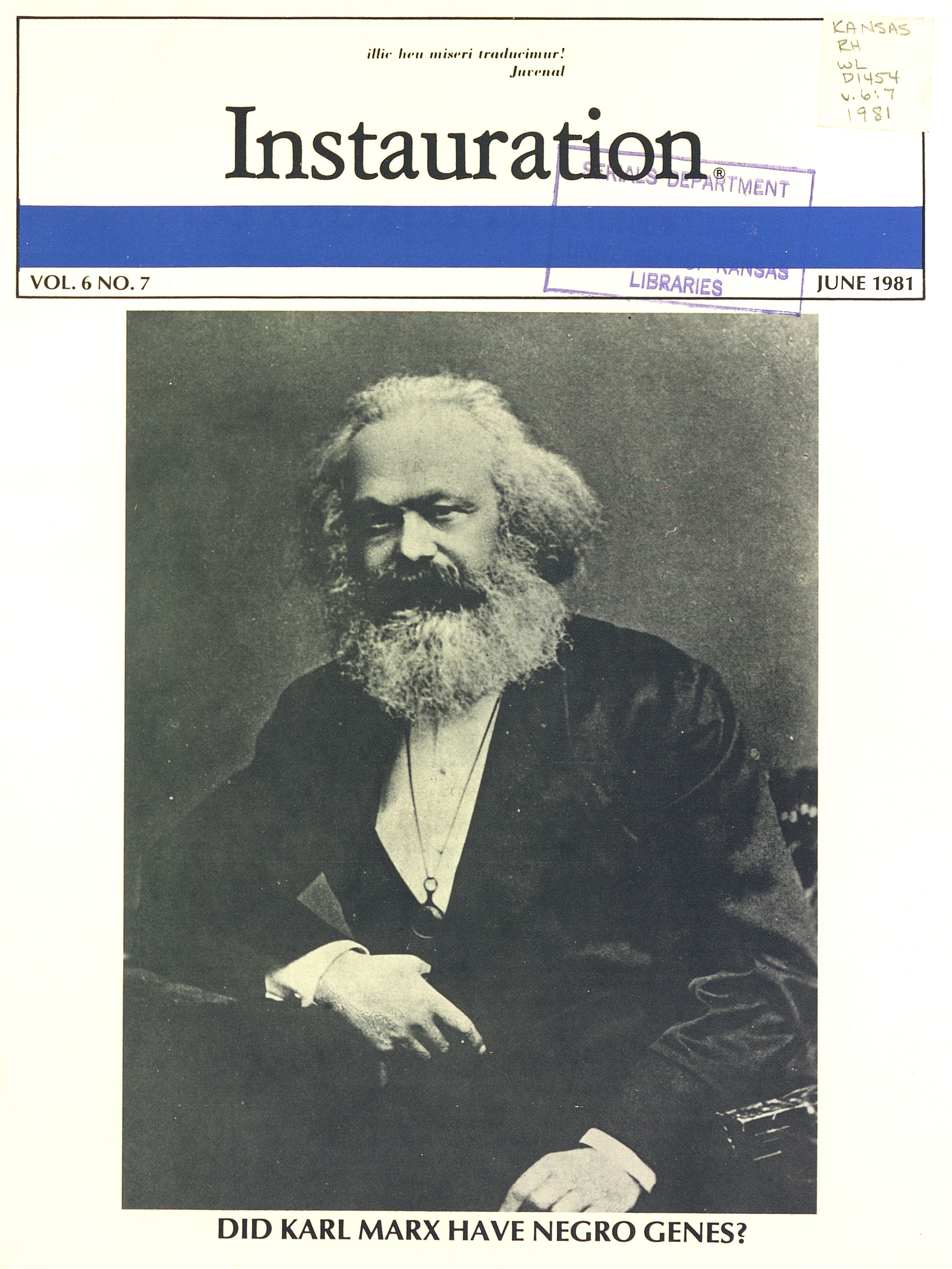
- Cover of the June 1981 issue, asking: "Did Karl Marx Have Negro Genes?"
- Editor: Wilmot Robertson
- Categories: Editorial
- Frequency: Monthly
- Publisher: Howard Allen Enterprises
- First issue: December 1975
- Final issue: February 2000
- Country: United States
- Based in: Cape Canaveral, Florida
- Language: English
- ISSN: 0277-2302
- OCLC: 6406234

Instauration was a monthly magazine published between December 1975 and February 2000 by white supremacist Wilmot Robertson. The magazine was based in Florida. The magazine was described as being hostile to African-Americans, Jews, immigrants, and the LGBT community. Thomas M. Konda noted that the magazine "marked the beginning of intellectual white supremacism".

== History ==
Instauration was established in December 1975 by white supremacist Humphrey Ireland, under the pen-name "Wilmot Robertson". Robertson was editor, publisher, and a major contributor to the magazine. He had previously written the book The Dispossessed Majority. This book became a cult classic among white supremacists. The magazine was based in Florida. The title "Instauration" is a term for the restoration of something after a significant amount of time has passed.

On February 15, 1986, Martin O'Toole, a white supremacist activist who had Instauration as one of his business customers, set up a conference display for the magazine at the seventh conference of the Holocaust denial organization the Institute for Historical Review in California. Far-right writer Revilo P. Oliver wrote for Instauration.

The magazine was published monthly. Unlike most ideological publications and especially white supremacist ones, it was notable for maintaining a regular publication schedule. It published an issue every month from its launch to at least 1999. The magazine ceased publication in February 2000.

== Content and influence ==
The magazine was described as being hostile to African-Americans, Jews, immigrants, and the LGBT community. The publication regularly denied the Holocaust. It was known for being, relative to other white supremacist publications, "highbrow" in an aware way. It also included media reviews of theater and artwork with a racist bent. It was printed in professional magazine format. In content, tone, and style it was similar to American Renaissance magazine, established in 1990 by Jared Taylor.

Thomas M. Konda noted that the magazine "marked the beginning of intellectual white supremacism". Mitch Berbrier, in an article titled "Impression Management for the Thinking Racist", described the magazine as an attempt "to present an intellectualized rhetoric of racism and white supremacy". He wrote that "If the reader is accustomed to white supremacist periodicals such as White Patriot, WAR, White Power, or even the slightly more upscale NAAWP News, she might be surprised by the relative paucity of demeaning racial slurs, the emphasis on correct spelling, proper grammar, and sophisticated vocabulary, and by the level of relative abstraction at which several of the contributors write." Leonard Zeskind described it as "high-toned". Arnold Birenbaum said the magazine was "heavy on ridicule" and "had a kind of musty nineteenth century right-wing French quality to it, from the time of the Dreyfus Affair."

Its letters to the editor section was named by Robertson "The Safety Valve", as a way for the "dispossessed" to express their rage. It was notable for the vitriol of its contents; writers here were addressed by the first three numbers of their zip codes, rather than their names, in order to protect their privacy. Readers would write in their complaints about non-white peoples. Another section was a comic that stereotyped black and Jewish people.

Robert Jay Mathews, the leader of The Order, was a reader, as was David Duke.
