= The Fame of a Dead Man's Deeds =

2000 book by Robert S. Griffin

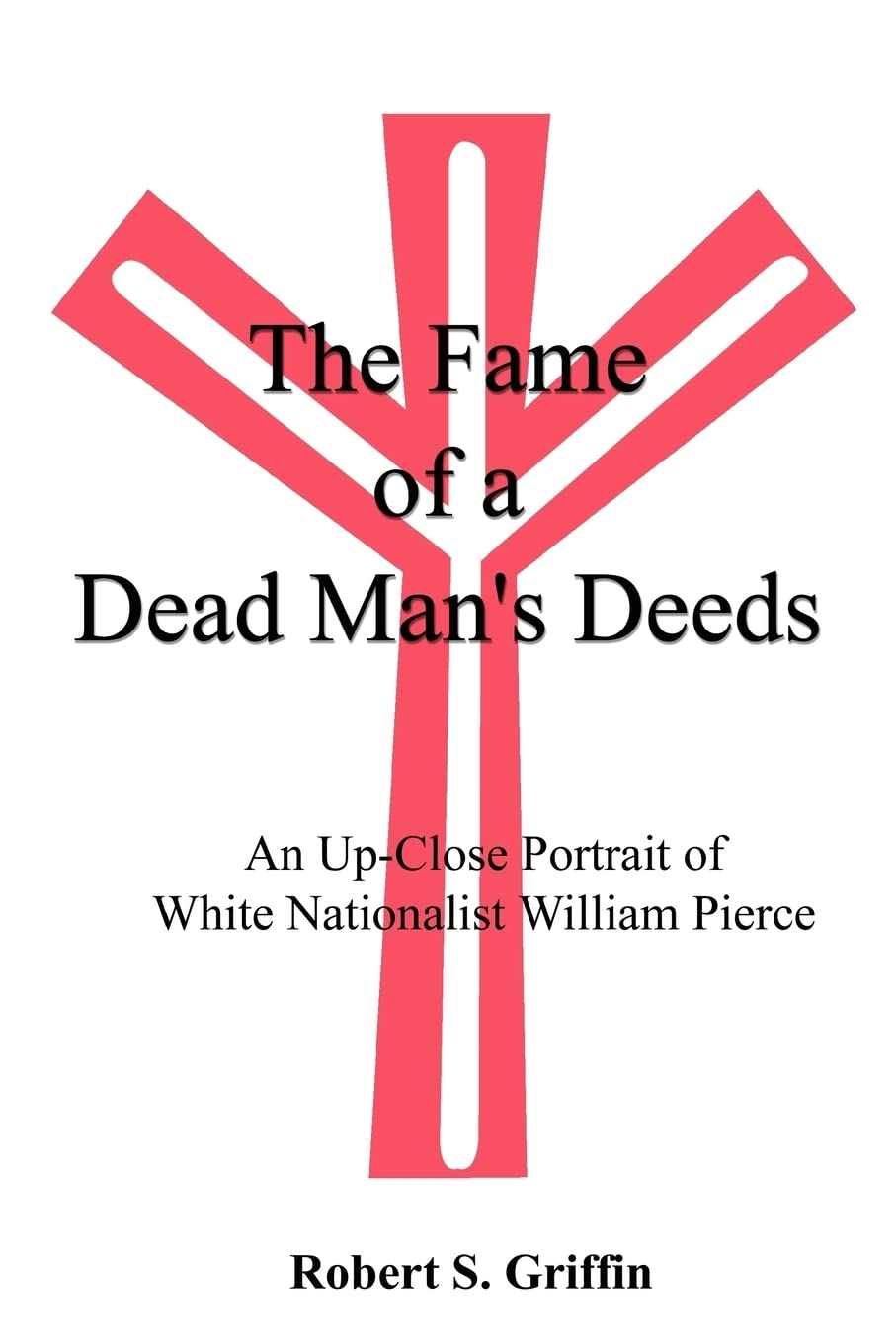
- Cover of 2001 edition
- Author: Robert S. Griffin
- Language: English
- Subject: William Luther Pierce
- Publisher: Self-published
- Publication date: 2000
- Publication place: United States
- Pages: 420
- ISBN: 0-7596-0933-0
- OCLC: 530177967

The Fame of a Dead Man's Deeds: An Up-Close Portrait of White Nationalist William Pierce is a biography of William Luther Pierce, the leader of the white supremacist group the National Alliance and the author of The Turner Diaries. It was written by Robert S. Griffin, an academic and professor of the University of Vermont. After Griffin failed to find a traditional publisher, he self-published the book online in 2000, and in print with 1stBooks Library the next year. In writing the book, Griffin interviewed Pierce, traveling with him to attend a neo-Nazi convention in Germany and spending a month at his West Virginia compound.

Based largely on interviews with Pierce, it recounts his early life and ideological influences, as well as his views. While Griffin claimed that he did not agree with Pierce, the book was controversial and was widely regarded as very sympathetic to him. Sources variously described it as "fawning", "admiring", and "offensively obsequious". Despite this, it has been often cited for information on Pierce, and received some praise from academics. Neo-Nazis, and Pierce himself, also praised the book.

== Background ==
Robert S. Griffin was then a tenured professor of education at the University of Vermont. He received both his masters and doctorate degrees from the University of Minnesota in 1967 and 1973. His works prior to The Fame of a Dead Man's Deeds were on education. He interviewed William Luther Pierce for the biography, spending a month with him at his compound in West Virginia, also traveling to Germany with him to attend a neo-Nazi convention. In writing the book, he said that "Pierce cooperated fully and never once asked me to delete or change a thing." Pierce was otherwise extremely reclusive and, with the exception of Griffin, rarely gave interviews.

On his website, Griffin said that he found Pierce to be "a person of remarkable capability, decency, integrity, courage, and dedication", and said in an interview that he found Pierce to be "the most fascinating human being I’ve ever been around — ever". He called The Fame of a Dead Man's Deeds a "book of explication", rather than one of apologetics, analysis, or critique. He said of writing it that "Am I proud of this book? Yes. Would I do it again? Yes. Would I think that it’s a positive contribution? Yes. Do I think that everybody thinks that? No." Pierce died of cancer in July 2002.

== Contents ==
The Fame of a Dead Man's Deeds is a biography of William Luther Pierce, the leader of the white supremacist group the National Alliance and the author of The Turner Diaries. Griffin largely leaves the readers to come to their own conclusions, and avoided terms such as "neo-Nazi" and "white supremacist" in labeling those involved, claiming labels would deflect the debate. He did however use the term "white nationalist". The book's title comes from an Old Norse poem from the Hávamál that Pierce enjoyed, which is included at the start of the book: "Cattle die and kinsman die, and so too must one die oneself. But there is one thing I know that never dies, and that is the fame of a dead man's deeds". There are numerous, mostly short, chapters.

In the preface, Griffin recounts an anecdote about Pierce's wife asking him not to use her name for her safety, the only name he changed. In an introduction, Griffin begins with the Oklahoma City bombing, which was inspired by The Turner Diaries, and how it began his interest in Pierce. It recounts Pierce's early life, his ideological influences, among them his interest in the John Birch Society, Revilo P. Oliver, and his eventual contact with George Lincoln Rockwell and the American Nazi Party. It tells of how he developed his views during his time as a university professor during the controversial 1960s counterculture period, which he called an "awakening experience". Griffin gives a background on authors who inspired Pierce; among them, Pierce praises Savitri Devi and her book The Lightning and the Sun. The book also includes summaries of both The Turner Diaries and Pierce's other novel, Hunter. Griffin profiles his contact with Oliver, portraying it as more substantial than Oliver otherwise admitted. Griffin says it was actually his contact with Oliver that inspired Pierce to begin writing fiction. Pierce was substantially influenced in his writing of The Turner Diaries by an anonymous book, The John Franklin Letters; Pierce guesses that this was actually written by Oliver, who had given him the book, a theory which Griffin is convinced of moreso than Pierce.

It also discusses Pierce's reaction to the Oklahoma City bombing. Towards the end of the book Griffin describes and analyzes Pierce's views on several topics, including World War II, men and women, immigration, multiculturalism, Jews, and racism, in individual chapters. Griffin argues that Pierce's creation of his cosmotheism philosophy was to provide a spiritual backing to the National Alliance's actions. The book ends with a description of Pierce and Griffin's last meeting. Griffin asks him what he would like his legacy to be. Pierce says that he would "love to be around a thousand years from now but I won't be", and so he accepts instead that he devotes his life to racist causes, which means that "a part of while I was alive goes on after my death". They exchange goodbyes.

== Publication ==
Griffin and his agent tried to find a traditional publisher for the book, but it was repeatedly rejected by publishers they sent it to. According to Griffin, this was not for political reasons, but because publishers thought no one would be interested. In October 2000, Griffin digitally self-published the book. It was 420 pages long. It is an authorized biography. It was initially self-published through MightyWords.com (a digital Barnes & Noble subsidiary, defunct by 2002), sold for $8 a copy. It was at #1 on the bestseller list of that site. In 2001, it was self-published in print through the self-publishing company 1stBooks Library. It was the first book-length writing on Pierce.

Griffin told The Village Voice that he did not agree with Pierce, but merely served as a conduit for his views, saying that "If you want to see what he says, where he comes from, here it is. Do I agree with him? No." He described his approach as "cultural anthropology" and that it was not a biography but a "relatively unfiltered look at Pierce". Griffin stated that his views and contact with Pierce changed him to be more "race conscious". He said writing the book "changed [his] life forever", that he "came away from my encounter with Pierce far more conscious of race from a white perspective and of myself as a white man and of my European cultural and historical roots." After the publication of the book, Griffin wrote two further books on white nationalism, which the SPLC criticized as being sympathetic, and he was later accused of being a neo-Nazi.

== Reception ==
The Fame of a Dead Man's Deeds was criticized by several commentators for being too sympathetic to Pierce. Sources variously described it as a "hagiography", "fawning", "admiring", and "offensively obsequious". The Southern Poverty Law Center said it was effectively an autobiography of Pierce, and said that Griffin clearly looked up to him. Martin A. Lee, writing for the SPLC, said it was not surprising that Pierce had not asked Griffin to change anything, as "there is very little, if anything, that Pierce would object to in the text" and "much of Griffin's tome consists of tedious regurgitations of Pierce’s own words". T.K. Kim, also for the SPLC, criticized it for presenting "an almost entirely one-sided justification of his racist beliefs", and said that Griffin portrayed Pierce as "a scholarly guardian of European cultural heritage" rather than "a racist advocate of mass murder who once said that Jews should be herded into '10,000 railroad cattle cars' and sent to the bottom of an abandoned coal mine". Vox said of the book that it "extensively quotes Pierce spouting unchallenged white supremacist propaganda".

Journalist Leonard Zeskind, while citing the work, called it "an extremely sympathetic portrait of Pierce's ideas and person", and criticized it for failing to "locate Pierce in a movement environment or make a critical assessment of his ideas". Scholar William H. Katerberg called it an "uncritical biography", though referred the reader to it for more information on Pierce. Lee stated that it provided "a few interesting details" about Pierce, saying it that though it was "hardly a penetrating or critical study [...] it does provide many details that will interest students of American neo-Nazism". Lee also called it dangerous, because Griffin's "repeated self-identification as a college professor, along with his completely uncritical presentation of his subject, help to lend an air of legitimacy" to Pierce's ideas. Rabbi Abraham Cooper of the Simon Wiesenthal Center said of the book that it was "fine for people who are familiar with hatemongers' elaborate rationalizations but may be a problem for the masses", due to Griffin's lack of criticism of Pierce's ideas. Cooper said it "certainly offered some insight into the mind of Dr. Pierce" but that it was missing "a greater sense of perspective. For someone just walking into this cold, there’s something missing. There's a lack of critical analysis."

Despite its sympathies, it did receive some amount of praise from academics. Extremism scholar George Michael described it as an "excellent biography", while scholar Nicholas Goodrick-Clarke praised its comprehensiveness. The Village Voice said it was "readable" and that it did "sprinkle in some perspective", but that Pierce's ideas got "a lengthy hearing". Academic Brad Whitsel (one of the few people to have also interviewed Pierce), writing for Studies in Conflict & Terrorism, gave the book a mixed review. He noted it as the rare self-published book to "attract the attention of the academic community", and said that Griffin's portrait of Pierce's disparate career was well-done, but that the book was derailed by "frequent digressions" about Griffin's own experiences in lieu of more in depth analysis. He called the section on Pierce's Cosmotheist philosophy the most interesting, and praised Griffin's analysis of the philosophy's origins. He argued the author was "willing to leave many stones unturned", and particularly singled out the relative brevity of the discussion of Pierce's authored works and their influence on terrorist acts. Whitsel also said that Griffin mostly left Pierce's views unchallenged, which sometimes had interesting results but otherwise seemed basically autobiographical. Whitsel said that the book was largely uncritical, sometimes lacked perspective, and "[had] its shortcomings", but that it filled a gap as the first book-length work on Pierce, and was a book "worth reading" for scholars of extremism; Whitsel said it provided "an initial and fairly comprehensive 'portrait' of the most controversial actor associated with the contemporary American far right".

Despite its sympathy to Pierce, it is widely cited as a source for information about him. One analysis said of the work that it was largely factually accurate, but that it "has been widely recognized that Griffin’s biographical work is tinged by the author's own opinions" on him, and that it "largely accepts Pierce’s ideological self-identification and interpretation of events at face value". Stephen Kurczy noted it as "controversial", but drew details from the work. An encyclopedia entry on Pierce by William V. Moore noted it provided "many details on Pierce's life", but lacked "much critical analysis of the man and his organization". Pierce himself praised the book, and promoted it on his website. Neo-Nazis and white supremacists largely approved of the book, leaving positive reviews for it on many platforms.
