= Jenny Odell =

American artist, writer and educator

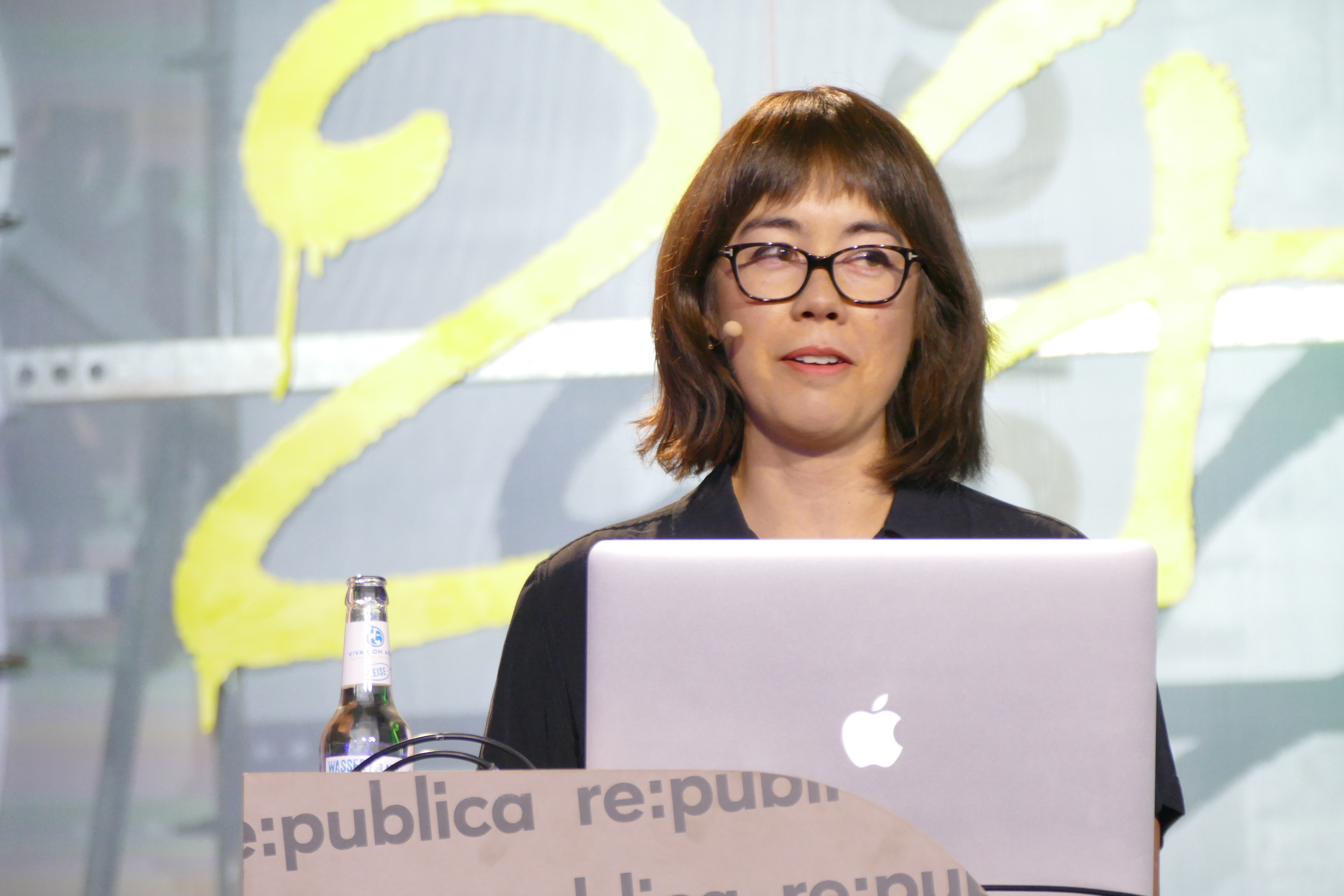
- Jenny Odell at Re:publica 2024
- Born: 1986 (age 39–40); San Francisco, California, U.S.
- Education: UC Berkeley; San Francisco Art Institute
- Occupations: Artist; writer; educator
- Notable work: How to Do Nothing: Resisting the Attention Economy (2019)
- Website: jennyodell.com

Jenny Odell (born 1986) is an American multidisciplinary artist, writer, and educator based in Oakland, California. She taught Internet art and digital/physical design at Stanford University from 2013 to 2021. She wrote The New York Times best-selling book How to Do Nothing: Resisting the Attention Economy (2019).

== Early life and education ==
Odell was born in San Francisco and grew up in Cupertino, California. She graduated from UC Berkeley in 2008 with a degree in English Literature and received her MFA in Design + Technology from the San Francisco Art Institute in 2010.

== Work ==
Odell's work consists of acts of close observations such as bird watching, collecting screenshots, or trying to parse bizarre forms of e-commerce. Many of her artistic projects re-use existing objects or images and put them in context, for example images from Google Earth and Google Maps. Odell has described where this approach comes from,

I often say that medium is context [...] Part of the reason I work this way is because I find existing things infinitely more interesting than anything I could possibly make.

=== The Bureau of Suspended Objects ===
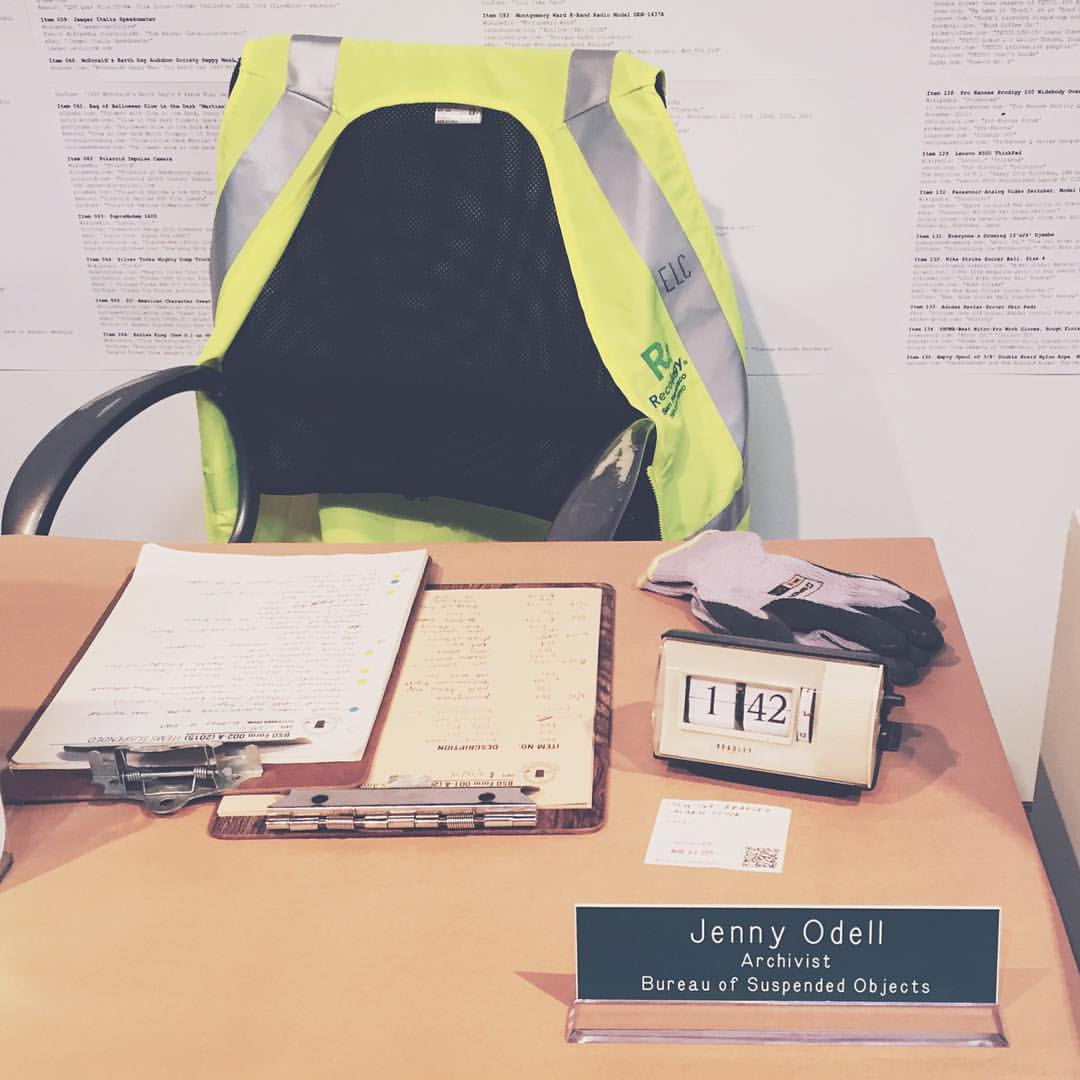
Jenny Odell's desk during her residency at Recology SF

In 2015, Odell was artist-in-residence at Recology SF, otherwise known as the San Francisco dump. The residency culminated in an exhibition of her work: The Bureau of Suspended Objects, a detailed archive of objects scavenged and selected at the dump. Odell conducted in-depth research into the manufacturing, distribution, popularity, and use of each object. Much of her art exists within and pulls from the Internet; this is no exception. The archive is accessible online and much of the content is pulled from the internet, such as Google street views of manufacturing plants and videos of commercials for products. The detailed history is meant to bring attention to resources involved in both the products' production and consumption.

=== Neo-Surreal ===
Neo-Surreal is a collection of work completed while Odell was artist-in-residence at the Internet Archive in 2017. While there, she came across a large collection of BYTE, an American computing magazine, from the 1980s. She pulled images from this archive, edited and curated in a way to highlight the surreal nature of the industry, both then and today. In her own words,

The reconfiguration of this material highlights the ways in which such imagery, viewed in hindsight, inadvertently portrays some of the stranger and more sinister aspects that technology eventually came to embody. For instance, one finds things like a computer wearing a policeman's hat and wielding a riding crop (evoking surveillance) or a pill opening to reveal a computer chip (evoking biometrics). Similarly to Richard Prince in his Cowboys series, I've done nothing here except to remove the text, restore some backgrounds, and re-title the images.

=== How to Do Nothing: Resisting the Attention Economy ===
Odell's book How to Do Nothing: Resisting the Attention Economy (2019) is about "how to disconnect from the attention economy". The book builds on the topics that had already surfaced in her previous artistic work: our relationship to technology and how observation can be a critical action. She explains how doing nothing can be a strategy to resist the profit-driven technology which attempts to hold our attention at all costs. Odell says doing nothing can be a refusal to take part in life online and instead re-engage with your physical surroundings. Jonah Bromwich praised the book in a review published by The New York Times "she goes on to construct a complex, smart and ambitious book that at first reads like a self-help manual, then blossoms into a wide-ranging political manifesto." In the end, the book is a criticism of capitalism, an argument against our standard definitions of productivity and an encouragement to re-engage with nature and local communities.

=== Saving Time: Discovering a Life Beyond the Clock ===
Published in March 2023 through Penguin Random House, Saving Time argues that how much of the world (particularly North American and Europe) perceives time is built around maximizing profit in a capitalist system rather than for the well-being of people. Sarah Jaffe's review in The Nation points out how Odell differentiates between what she labels as "kairos" and "chronos" time:

Chronos time is capitalist time: the employee time clock, the relentless pace of work, the “you have the same 24 hours in a day as Beyoncé” memes urging productivity. “Kairos,” Odell writes, “means something more like ‘crisis,’” and it is marked by a feeling of uncertainty, a feeling that time itself is passing in a different way, but also a time that is more hopeful. It is the time in which change—transformation—becomes possible. It is the time in which we become the creators of our own world.

== Publications ==
- Travel by Approximation: a virtual road trip. Self-published, 2010.
- I Hate to Part With It: Craigslist Farewells. Self-published, 2012.
- The Satellite Collections. Self-published, 2013.
- The Archive of the Bureau of Suspended Objects. Self-published, 2015. ISBN 9781364713102.
- Satellite Landscapes. Self-published, 2015.
- The Bureau of Suspended Objects at the Contemporary Jewish Museum. Self-published, 2016. ISBN 9781364465001. Exhibition catalogue.
- The Bureau of Suspended Objects at the Palo Alto Art Center. Self-published, 2016. ISBN 9781367171879. Exhibition catalogue.
- How to Do Nothing: Resisting the Attention Economy Brooklyn, NY: Melville House, 2019. ISBN 9781612197494.
- Saving Time: Discovering a Life Beyond the Clock, Random House, 2023. ISBN 9780593242704

== Exhibitions ==
- In That Case: Havruta in Contemporary Art. Odell and Philip Buscemi. January 28, 2016 – July 5, 2016.
- Peripheral Landscapes: The Art of Maps: A conversation with Odell and geospatial librarian Matt Knutzen. May 1, 2015.
- The Internet Archive's 2017 Artist in Residence Exhibition. August 5–26, 2017.
