= The John Franklin Letters =

1959 novel

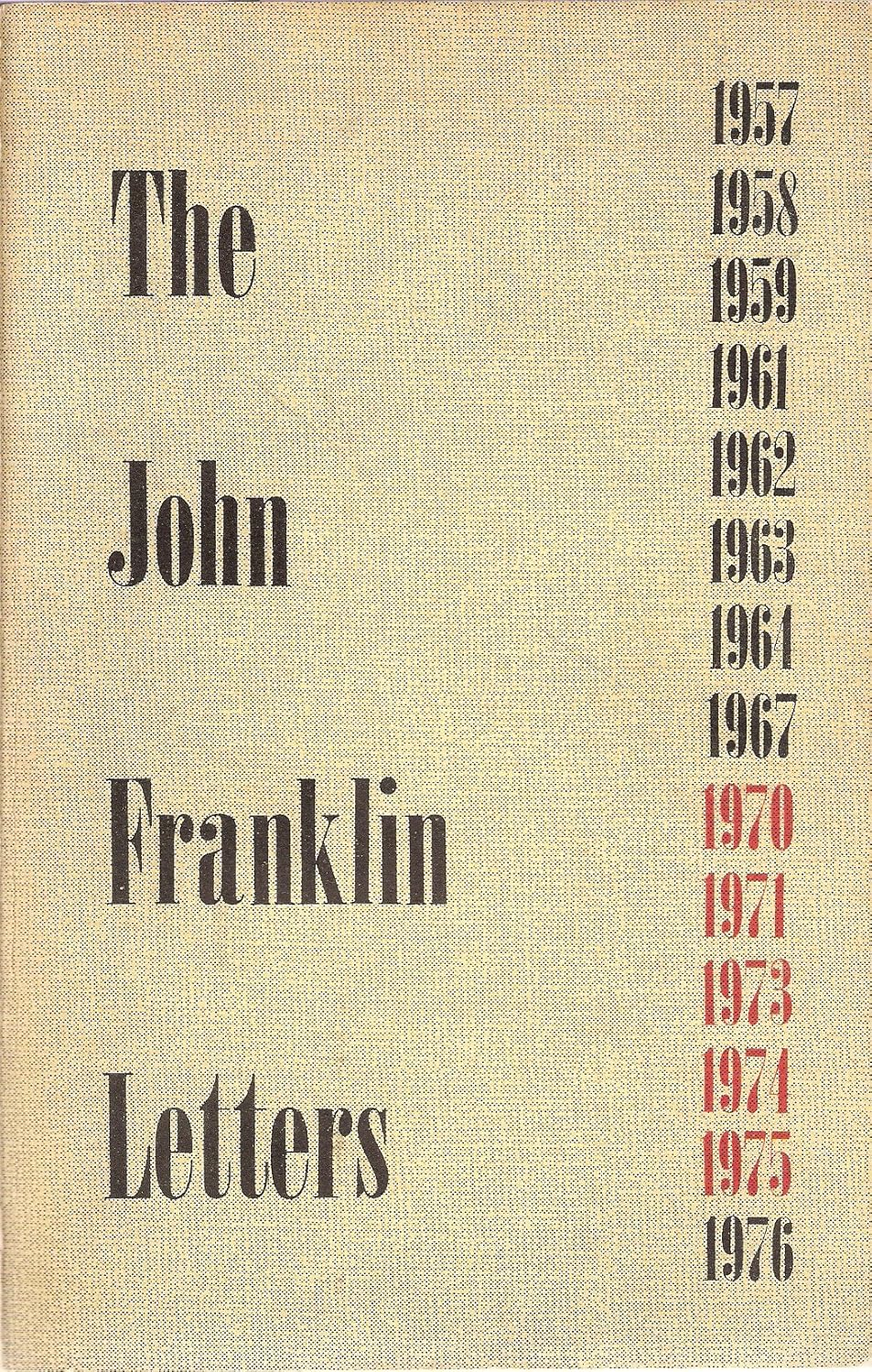
- Cover of the first edition
- Author: Anonymous (probably Revilo P. Oliver)
- Language: English
- Genre: Dystopian fiction
- Publisher: The Bookmailer
- Publication date: 1959
- Publication place: United States
- Pages: 178
- OCLC: 1060810
- Dewey Decimal: 901.9
- LC Class: CB160 .J6

The John Franklin Letters is a 1959 dystopian anti-communist novel. Published anonymously by The Bookmailer, it was likely written by far-right activist Revilo P. Oliver, a founding member of the John Birch Society and classics professor. The book was distributed and popularized by the John Birch Society. It is overtly politically right-wing and anti-communist, presenting communism as a system that can be easily overthrown with determined resistance. The book also focuses on racist themes; it was written in a period of division over race within the John Birch Society.

An epistolary novel, it utilizes a framing device with the eponymous letters being contextualized in a preface by a future historian. After the New Deal, the United States is taken over by the "Buros" (bureaucrats). The Buros eventually give power to the United Nations, who occupy the country with foreign fighters. They seize all guns, and in their first year of power, over 20 million Americans die. The protagonist, John Franklin, is a member of the Rangers, the resistance to the regime; their struggle to restore America is recounted in the letters between him and his elderly uncle.

The book was not a mainstream success. Contemporary commentary from the conservative National Review praised the book, while it was criticized by the left. Later commentators have described it as anti-communist propaganda. The book contains practical advice on insurgency, and as a result acquired a reputation of being an insurgency guide; it influenced the far-right into adopting a cellular model of organization. It inspired the creation of the Minutemen and the Patriot movement, and was the primary inspiration for the novel The Turner Diaries.

== Plot summary ==
The John Franklin Letters uses a framing device, with the letters in the story being collected by a future historian. The book's preface is dated July 17, 1989, with the historian contextualizing the letters, though he vows to "step aside" and let the reader take their own interpretation from them.

The bulk of the narrative is made up of correspondence between elderly farmer Jacob Semmes Franklin and his nephew John Semmes Franklin, born 1920. The letters begin in 1957. John Franklin bemoans the path the country has gone on since the election of president Franklin D. Roosevelt and his New Deal; he criticizes the latter as resulting in overreliance on government, as does welfare (which he says black Americans and Puerto Ricans are over-reliant on). Another complaint is that police are made to not police or lightly police non-whites, which has the result of some urban areas escalating into civil war.

In the late 1950s, various liberal factions, the subversive class of "Buros" (bureaucrats) launch a takeover of the government. They force the country into an overpowered bureaucracy, with the Buros running the nation. They give increased power to the United Nations, who eventually have their foreign fighters, mostly Chinese, occupy the country, suspending the right of the people to defend themselves due to America's "historic psychological genocide" against the black population. The regime becomes increasingly authoritarian and passes a law mandating all gun owners register their guns in preparation for their seizure. During the first year of this regime, 20 million Americans are either enslaved overseas or simply killed. Career military officers, especially a problem for the regime, are marched to the Grand Canyon and executed en masse. Many cities are annihilated with nuclear bombs.

The Rangers, a secretive organized resistance, form. Prior to the Buros taking control of the US, the Rangers predicted what was to come and stockpiled firearms and trained for war in preparation. John Franklin is one of them, having stockpiled rifles starting in 1967. In 1973 they begin a guerrilla war against the government, utilizing small cells to increase their secrecy and engaging in large-scale acts of sabotage, including at least fourteen murders recounted by Franklin. Slowly, the Rangers win over the American populace, who help the war effort by sabotaging the system, which buckles the government's distribution and manufacturing capabilities.

In 1976, the Rangers finally take control of Washington, D.C., inspiring similar revolts worldwide in countries with left-wing governments, including in Russia, China, England, Ireland, and France. At the end of the book, it is discovered that Mr. Harrison, a black Ranger and minor government officeholder, is constitutionally obligated to become president. The book ends with Harrison being inaugurated as president and the US returning to a constitutional republic.

== Background and publication history ==
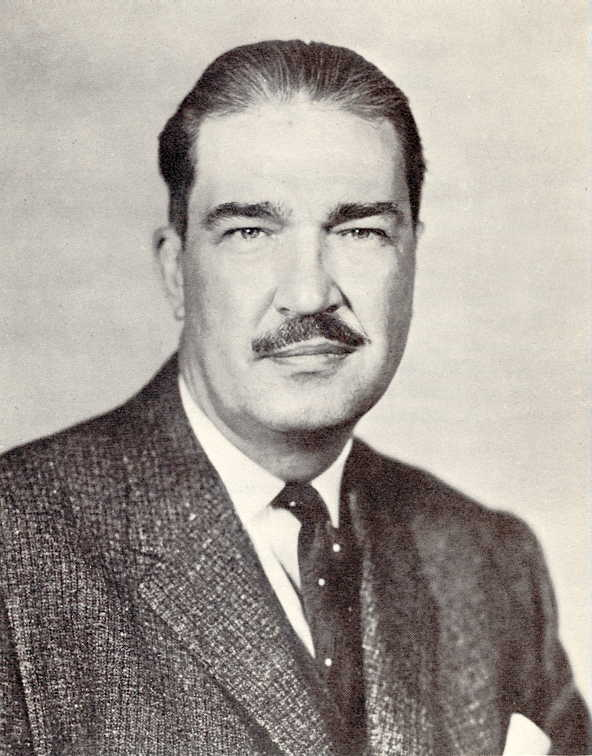
Oliver, pictured 1963

The book was published in 1959 by The Bookmailer. It was distributed by the John Birch Society (JBS), which contributed to its popularity. No author was listed for the book and it included no publishing information. The actual author is probably far-right activist Revilo P. Oliver, a founding member of the JBS and classics professor at the University of Illinois Urbana-Champaign; according to Jeffrey Kaplan his work was known for "dry intellectual prose". The book was edited by Harley N. Ogden, a professor at the same university as Oliver. Ogden is also a possible author. The introduction is credited to Ogden. Oliver had written at length about race and anti-Communism prior to the book's publication.

At the time of the book's publication in the 1950s, there was a deep divide in the JBS over race. Most members viewed race as a distraction from what they thought was the true issue, fighting a worldwide communist conspiracy, but there was a separate contingent motivated more by racism. Antisemitism and racism were eventually disavowed by the JBS's leadership, which was against the racial faction, in the 1963 book The Neutralizers. Members with more racist views exited and were eventually expelled. Oliver was one of the individuals expelled from the John Birch Society over his racist views.

== Reception and analysis ==
The book was not a mainstream success. Contemporaneously, it was criticized by the left while it was positively considered by the conservative National Review. Its mainstream notice was however short lived. It was withdrawn only a few years after its publication, and in 2017 was only available in archives and at extremely high online prices. Contemporary journalist Murray Kempton said of the book that:

This, of course, is the Bircher's dream. America slides unresistingly into Communism; a few Mike Hammers find their rifles; and in five years the world is free. The Birch mind is only the Mickey Spillane mind. There is that lingering over and savoring of pure physical violence, the daydream of the disarmed. Reading The John Franklin Letters we can recognize Robert Welch’s voice. He is Charles Atlas saying to us again that we need only mail the letter and back will come the muscles which we will use to throw the bully off the beach and have the girl turn to us with eyes shining with the sudden knowledge of how special we are.

The book focuses on some racist themes, mostly the fear whites will be genocided if they are no longer the majority, but is more focused on contemporaneous conservative issues of the time like communist infiltration and government overreach. Kaplan said that despite the preference for constitutionalism over race in the book, Oliver's racism was clear, but that it was "couched in the dogma of much of the radical right which saw Black people as indolent and somewhat malevolent, but essentially innocent pawns of the Jews."

George Michael called the ending of the novel, where a black man becomes president and this is portrayed in a positive light, ironic in light of its other racial grievances. Kaplan argued this was what separated The John Franklin Letters from The Turner Diaries, with this signaling a disavowal of the segregationists in the John Birch Society. Oliver was one of the individuals expelled from the John Birch Society over his racist views. Drawing an analogy to the 2016 United States presidential election, Kaplan said that "In a sense, the domestic side of the story of the 2016 American presidential election metaphorically begins where The John Franklin Letters ended: with the election of a Black president". Kaplan also noted that, given his later views, "one assumes that Oliver eventually found that the racially harmonious denouement of The John Franklin Letters to be a bit of an embarrassment".

Kaplan noted the book's "dogged faith in America and its Constitution" as contrasting with the views of later racist works of its ilk, as did its lack of "future millennial paradise". He further said it was "remarkable for the way it reflected the mood of the far right of the day", utilizing it as an example of a reformist mood of the 1950s far-right, compared to the 1970s apocalyptic Turner Diaries. J.M. Berger of the International Centre for Counter-Terrorism noted the book as "unabashedly right-wing in orientation" and "foremost a work of anti-Communist propaganda". The book assumes that communism is inherently fragile and inefficient, and with any determined resistance it can be overthrown. He compared it to the book The Iron Heel in its explanation of its ideology, though in contrast to that work called it "admirably succinct" in doing so. Another comparison was drawn to Anticipations of the Future, with both focusing on national level politics. Rob McAlear described it as "a straightforward tale of conservative resistance to what we would now call 'The New World Order'." McAlear argued that it provided "the foundation" for The Turner Diaries, and said its usage of "a new political timeline" stemming from initially real historical events was taken up by Pierce in that book.

== Legacy ==
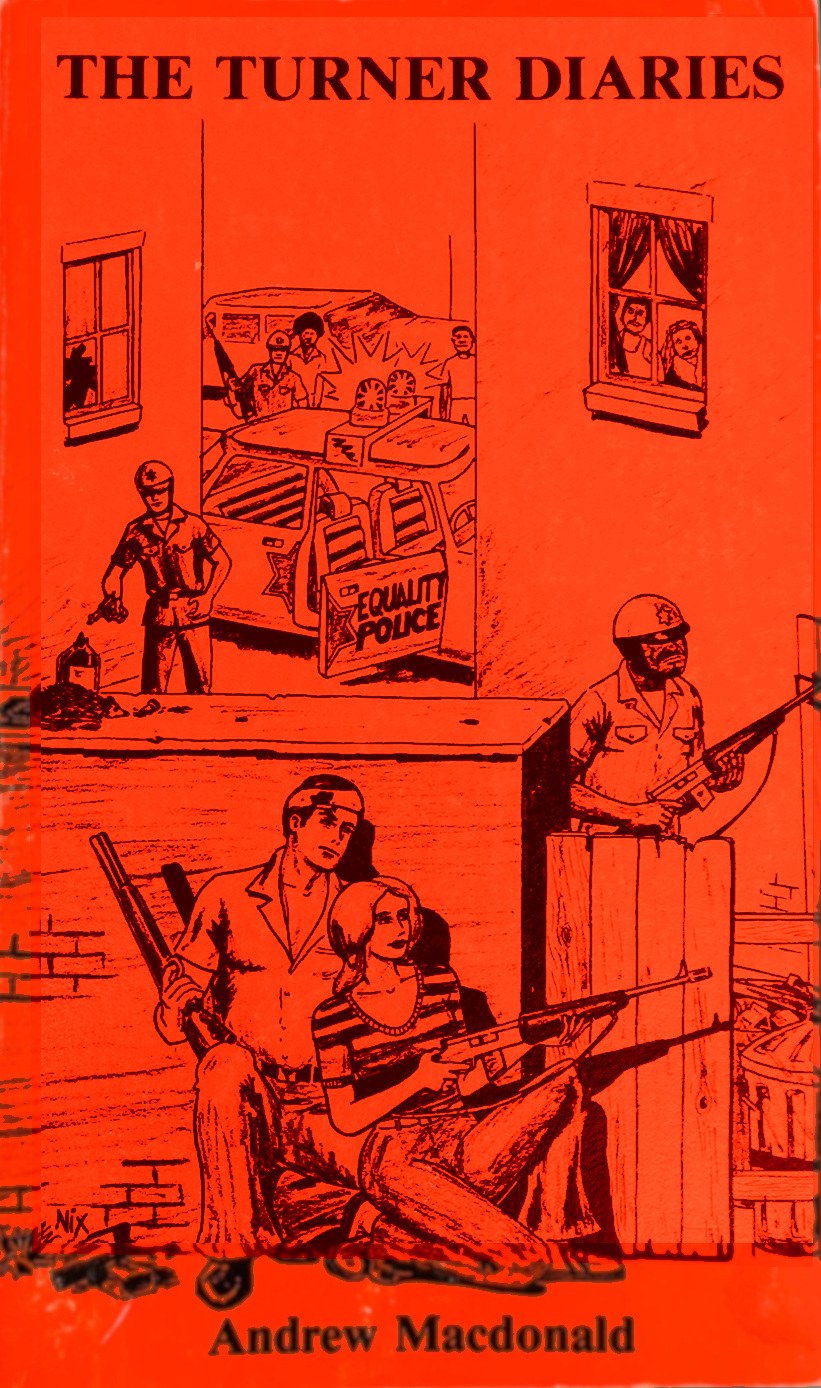
1978 cover of The Turner Diaries, which The John Franklin Letters inspired

While it was not a mainstream success, The John Franklin Letters had a profound impact on the far-right. The novel is seen as the first modern book in its genre; scholar Jeffrey Kaplan described it as "one of the earliest dystopian opuses to appear in the far right". The book, with its plot focusing on insurgency, contains actual advice on how to best be an insurgent and to resist the government. As a result, The John Franklin Letters acquired a reputation of being an insurgency how-to manual and inspired direct action to a degree unlike prior books like it. It inspired the creation of the anti-government militia the Minutemen and the Patriot movement. A short-lived paramilitary group also took its name from the Rangers in the novel. It influenced the far right's usage of the cellular model of organization.

In his authorized biography The Fame of a Dead Man's Deeds, The John Franklin Letters was cited by William Luther Pierce as the most direct inspiration for his novel The Turner Diaries, a book which has been linked to numerous acts of terrorism and murder. Similar to The John Franklin Letters, The Turner Diaries utilizes a framing device where the events are prefaced by an in-universe future historian, though the historian in The John Franklin Letters says he will "step aside" to let the reader judge on their own. Pierce said that he had been given this book by Revilo P. Oliver; Oliver had recently written a review for Pierce's magazine Attack!. In a meeting (likely in late 1974), Pierce expressed to Oliver that he was having difficulty getting people to respond to his message. Oliver asked him if he had considered writing fiction, as the kinds of people who would appreciate Pierce's views just did not read the non-fiction material Pierce had previously written. Pierce believed Oliver authored The John Franklin Letters. It may have influenced Sam Greenlee, who wrote The Spook Who Sat by the Door.
