= Thomas M. Konda =

American political scientist (1947–2022)

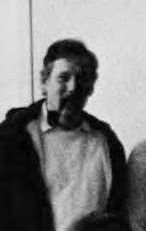
- Konda at SUNY Plattsburgh in 1987
- Born: Thomas Milan Konda; September 20, 1947
- Died: January 29, 2022 (aged 74)

Academic background
- Education: University of Alabama (BA); University of New Orleans (MA); University of Kentucky (PhD)

Academic work
- Institutions: State University of New York at Plattsburgh
- Notable works: Conspiracies of Conspiracies

Thomas Milan Konda (September 20, 1947 – January 29, 2022) was an American political science professor and author. He wrote Conspiracies of Conspiracies and was professor emeritus of political science at State University of New York at Plattsburgh.

== Early life and education ==
Konda was born September 20, 1947. He received a BA in history from the University of Alabama, a master's degree in political science from the University of New Orleans, and a PhD from the University of Kentucky.

== Career ==
Konda began teaching at Plattsburgh State in 1986. He was a routine commentator on politics in Northern New York and Vermont for outlets such as NBC and North Country Public Radio, and gave a lecture at the Angell College Center discussing conspiracies.

=== Conspiracies of Conspiracies ===
While publishing scholarly work as an academic, it was not until retirement as professor emeritus that Dr. Konda published his first and only book, Conspiracies of Conspiracies, with the University of Chicago Press. It traces the United States' obsession with conspiratorial thought through history. The book was described as "the most comprehensive intellectual history of American conspiracy theories yet produced..." by The American Historical Review. Kirkus Reviews praised the book and said it was a book that "deserves wide circulation and consideration but that is likely to be drowned out in all the conspiratorial noise".

He was asked to discuss his perspective on conspiracism on the BBC radio program Thinking Allowed, where host Laurie Taylor explored the extent to which certain countries and people are more inclined to believe in them. In 2020, he participated in the event Lockdown Live: The Politics of Truth, a discussion on the effects of conspiracism hosted by Red Pepper, with Marcus Gilroy-Ware, Sarah Jaffe, and Hilary Wainwright.

== Personal life and death ==
Konda was married, and had three children. He died January 29, 2022.
