= George Racey Jordan =

American businessman, lecturer, activist, and author

George Racey Jordan (January 4, 1898 – May 5, 1966) was an American military officer, businessman, lecturer, activist, and author. He first gained nationwide attention in December 1949 when he testified to the United States Congress about wartime Lend-Lease deliveries to the Soviet Union, in the process implicating Harry Hopkins and other high officials in the transfer of nuclear and other secrets to the USSR.

== Early career ==
Jordan, who usually went by his middle name Racey, was born in New York City on 4 January 1898, and attended New York University. According to his own writings, he enlisted in 1917 and was sent to Kelly Field, Texas, and served as a corporal in the U.S. Army Air Service in France with the 147th Aero Squadron under Captain Eddie Rickenbacker's 1st Pursuit Group. After the war he worked in private business as a sales and advertising executive. The New York Times wrote that Jordan was advertising manager for several brewing companies in New York at various times. In 1949, he was assistant to the president of the American Pacific Industrial Corporation. Newly remarried, he said that he had an apartment in the city, another home in Punxsutawney, Pennsylvania, and a ranch near Bremerton, Washington.

== Lend-lease officer ==
One year too young for the age exemption, in 1942 Captain Jordan returned to the service. On account of business experience, he was assigned as a Lend-Lease control officer in the U.S. Army Air Corps, with rank of captain. In 1942, Jordan oversaw deliveries of aircraft and other supplies at the Newark, New Jersey airport. With the opening of the ALSIB route via Alaska, Major Jordan was transferred to Gore Field, Great Falls, Montana, the last air transshipment station within the United States. In both locations, he interfaced primarily with Colonel Anatoli N. Kotikov of the Red Army. The two became friendly and Kotikov recommended Jordan's promotion. There was no indication that Jordan impeded Soviet activities, but he maintained records and often questioned the particulars of shipments.

Jordan later said he became alarmed at the extraordinary amount of supplies and unusual diplomatic immunity cargo going through Great Falls, Jordan began spying by keeping a detailed "diary" (actually three ledgers) in which he registered all he could discover about the Lend-Lease cargo. He claims that several times he cut open (without authorization) large numbers of "black suitcases" – sealed Soviet diplomatic cargo carried aboard aircraft being flown to the Soviet Union (Soviet crews taking over the aircraft at Fairbanks). When he advised superiors about the extraordinary nature of the cargo, he was repeatedly told to remain quiet. Major Jordan was noted for maintaining good relations with Red Army officers, and by his own account was more of a problem for lax and incompetent U.S. officers.

In 1944, Major Jordan returned to business, and although he had a sideline as a public speaker, he attracted little attention until 1949 when interest in Soviet nuclear espionage was at its peak. After President Harry Truman announced the first Soviet atomic bomb test, Jordan consulted his ledgers. He found that uranium, heavy water, other nuclear weapons related materials, and related schematics and papers had gone through Great Falls to the USSR. Jordan served in the Air Corps on United Nations duty from 10 May 1942 to spring 1944, being discharged from the service on 4 July 1944. At that time he did not understand the nature of many nuclear-related cargoes.

== Congressional testimony ==
Hearing of his experiences, Senator Styles Bridges took contact with Jordan, whose evidence was given to the Federal Bureau of Investigation (FBI). After Jordan told right-wing radio reporter Fulton Lewis Jr. about what he had witnessed, he was interviewed on Lewis's program, and on 5 December 1949 Jordan testified (along with General Leslie Groves, head of the Manhattan Project) to the House Un-American Activities Committee about the transfers. In particular, he advised that it was rumored along the Lend-Lease supply chain that Harry Hopkins in the White House would authorize anything the Soviets desired, and that Colonel Kotikov needed only call Hopkins whenever he encountered any difficulty. He also stated that he found in the diplomatic suitcases letters on White House stationery, signed H.H., to Soviet Lend-Lease commissar Anastas Mikoyan. (Hopkins actually used the initials "HLH" on his memos.) In particular he noted one such slip:

A salutation, "My dear Mr. Minister," led to a few sentences of stock courtesies. One passage, of eleven words, in the top line of the second page, impressed me enough to merit a scribble on my envelope. That excerpt ran thus: " – had a hell of a time getting these away from Groves." (He could not decipher the first name in the line.)

Jordan also testified:

I distinctly remember five or six State Department folders, bound with stout rubber bands. Clipped to each was a tab. The first read: "From Sayre." I took down the words because it ran through my head that someone of that name had recently been High Commissioner to the Philippines. Then I copied the legend: "From Hiss." I had never heard of Alger Hiss, and made the entry because the folder bearing his name happened to be second in the pile. It contained hundreds of Photostats of what seemed to be military reports. There was a third name which I did not copy but which stuck in my mind because it was the same as that of my dentist. The tab read: "From Geiger." I did not list and cannot remember the names on other State Department folders.

Alger Hiss had been Assistant Secretary of State during the war, and Francis Bowes Sayre, Sr. worked with him. Theodore Geiger was a Marshall Plan official later accused of Soviet espionage by Senator Joseph McCarthy. However, none of the transactions Jordan described showed any unlawful wrongdoing.

Coming at the beginning of the McCarthy campaign against alleged communists in the federal government, the testimony caused a public fury. Jordan (and General Groves) were called back to testify before HUAC on 3 March 1950, then providing further details and causing several agency investigations. The United States Department of State, while noting that the documented cargoes were authorized under Lend-Lease, maintained that Jordan did not prove Harry Hopkins (then deceased) broke the law, and noted that he always signed memos "HLH" not "HH."

The Committee's investigator, Donald T. Appell, said that much of the original Jordan story had been "substantiated generally." General Groves did not refute or confirm Jordan's testimony, but noted that he had done what he could to maintain atomic secrecy at a time when the USSR was receiving almost everything it demanded. Since he did not know that the Soviet atomic program shadowed the U.S. program, he had approved some shipments of nuclear material to avoid raising suspicion of the latter. The FBI, without taking a stand on the culpability of officials, noted that Major Jordan's account was consistent with official records and that his account matched that of other Lend-Lease officers.

However, some of Jordan's testimony was disputed or unverifiable. For example, he claimed that Harry Hopkins called him from Washington in the spring of 1944 and personally told him to expedite uranium shipments to the Soviet Union. When it was revealed that Hopkins was in intensive care at the Mayo Clinic in Minnesota in the spring of 1944, Jordan claimed the call actually occurred in 1943. Historian David Roll argues that Jordan "either lied for publicity and profit or was delusional." Declassified documents do not substantiate claims that Harry Hopkins purposefully colluded with the USSR.

The allegations caused great controversy in the inflamed political climate of the time. While Democrats (who at that time controlled HUAC) dismissed Jordan's testimony, Republicans championed it.

== Activist and author ==
In 1952, Major Jordan, now strongly associated with anti-communist groups, self-published the book From Major Jordan's Diaries, which described in great detail his account of the Soviet operations in the U.S. under Lend-Lease and diplomatic cover. He also wrote about many subjects of which he had only incidental knowledge as a cargo controller, such as the transfer of U.S. currency printing plates to the Soviet Union in 1944 for the purpose of producing Allied Military Mark in occupied Germany.

Jordan had already been active as a lecturer, and after his Congressional testimony he was much in demand nationwide. He specialized in making anti-communist speeches and serving in several fringe and right-wing causes. In particular, Jordan, who had been puzzled by the wartime delivery of "vast quantities of sodium fluoride" to the USSR, promoted the theory that fluoridation of public water supplies was a hidden Communist plot against America. He was quoted as follows: "I know fluoridation to be a very secret Russian revolutionary technique to deaden our minds, slow our reflexes, and gradually kill our will to resist aggression."

In 1954, Jordan unsuccessfully attempted to collect ten million signatures to protest the Senate's censure of Senator McCarthy. Before the U.S. Senate in 1955, he spoke on behalf of the "American Coalition" against the confirmation of Justice John Marshall Harlan II to the U.S. Supreme Court, asserting that Harlan might "abolish the United States by judicial decision" in favor of a new "World Government."

In 1959, Jordan published the book The Gold Swindle: The Story of our Dwindling Gold, about the loss of U.S. gold reserves. In 1960, he was "Chairman of the Committee for a Free Gold Market" and "President of the Toronto Gold Market Co.," and became president of "Greater Canada Gold Investments Ltd." His speeches were often printed and circulated. His writings have acquired a small, but perennial popularity among various political fringe groups.

== Legacy ==
Jordan's three ledgers were of importance to the FBI in mapping Soviet wartime activities in the United States. Researchers investigating the loss of atomic secrets to the USSR use his account as a source. In particular, Richard Rhodes used Jordan's book in his history of the H-bomb. Jordan gave a detailed and personal account of how Soviet Lend-lease worked in practice during 1943–44. While the Hopkins notes and Hopkin's motivations are disputed, Jordan's account of Hopkins's direct interventions for the USSR match contemporary accounts.

In 1956, Jordan settled a libel suit against NBC for "a substantial amount" after the network reported that Congressional investigators had "discredited Jordan's charges."

The New York Times, in reviewing Jordan's first book, described the author hereby: "What emerges in the way of self-portrait is an earnest, conscientious, deeply patriotic and limited man – a World War I "retread," as he wryly calls himself – who has got mixed up in an argument whose end is not in sight."

== Sources ==
- New York Times coverage 1949–1955
- Jordan's HUAC testimony covered in (minutes 1:00–1:20) F-2918: WARNER PATHE NEWS
- https://www.youtube.com/watch?v=QV7tRJKgjEk
- RECORDS OF THE U.S. HOUSE OF REPRESENTATIVES Record Group 233
- RECORDS OF THE HOUSE UN-AMERICAN ACTIVITIES COMMITTEE, 1945–1969
- Rhodes, numerous pages.
- Deane, 90, 98.

== Bibliography ==
- George R. Jordan: From Major Jordan's Diaries (with Richard L. Stokes). New York: Harcourt, Brace & Co., 1952.
- George R. Jordan: The Gold Swindle: The Story of Our Dwindling Gold. New York: Bookmailer, 1959.
- John R. Deane: The Strange Alliance: The Story of our Efforts at Wartime Co-operation with Russia. New York: Viking Press, 1947.
- David Roll, The Hopkins Touch: Harry Hopkins and the Forging of the Alliance to Defeat Hitler Oxford: Oxford University Press, 2012
- Richard Rhodes: Dark Sun: The Development of the H-Bomb. New York: Simon & Schuster, 1996.
