= William T. Poole =

American research analyst for the federal government (HUAC)

- Occupation: research analyst for the House Un-American Activities Committee
- Known for: William T. Poole collection donated to the Hoover Institution Library and Archives

William T. Poole was a 20th-century American research analyst for the US Congress who donated the "William T. Poole collection," one of two key collections to date of anti-Communist government files, to the Hoover Institution Library and Archives.

== Career ==
Poole was a research analyst on the minority (Republican Party) side of the House Un-American Activities Committee (HUAC) staff from the mid-1960s until the Committee's dissolution in 1973. When HUAC ended, Poole took possession of files unwanted for permanent government retention.

By 1977, Poole had become a senior researcher and editor at The Heritage Foundation, to which he contributed through 1982. His work received mention in the Congressional Record.

In 1982, Poole gave his collection of material to the Hoover Institution Library and Archives at Stanford University. The collection comprises 242 manuscript boxes (100.8 linear feet), including: reports, correspondence, minutes, hearing transcripts, legal exhibits, clippings, serial issues, pamphlets, and leaflets, relating to Communism and radicalism in the United States, and to the anti-Vietnam War movement, plus exhibits of Subversive Activities Control Board and files of HUAC.

== Legacy ==
In January 2013, when the Hoover Institution acquired his collection of papers of Herbert Romerstein, it noted that Romerstein papers will be Hoover's largest collection on communist subversion and the activities of communist front organizations, complementing its previous holdings of papers of the Subversive Activities Control Board from William T. Poole.

== Works ==
- "The Environmental Complex - Part III," Heritage Foundation Reports (1982)
- "The Attack on the Corporation," Heritage Foundation Reports (1981)
- "Campaign for Economic Democracy Part II: The Institute for Policy Studies Net," Heritage Foundation Reports (1981)
- "Campaign for Economic Democracy Part I: The New Left in Politics," Heritage Foundation Reports (1980)
- "The Criminal Code Reform Act of 1979 (S. 17222)," Heritage Foundation Reports (1980)
- "The Anti-Defense Lobby Part 3: Coalition for a New Foreign and Military Policy," Heritage Foundation Reports (1979)
- "The Anti-Defense Lobby Part 1: Center for Defense Information," Heritage Foundation Reports (1979)
- "The New Left in Government: From Protest to Policy-Making," Heritage Foundation Reports (1978)
- "The Environmental Complex - Part II," Heritage Foundation Reports (1978)
- "The National Committee for an Effective Congress," Heritage Foundation Reports (1978)
- "Unionization of the Military (S.274 - S.997)," Heritage Foundation Reports (1977)
