= The Turner Diaries =

1978 novel by William Luther Pierce

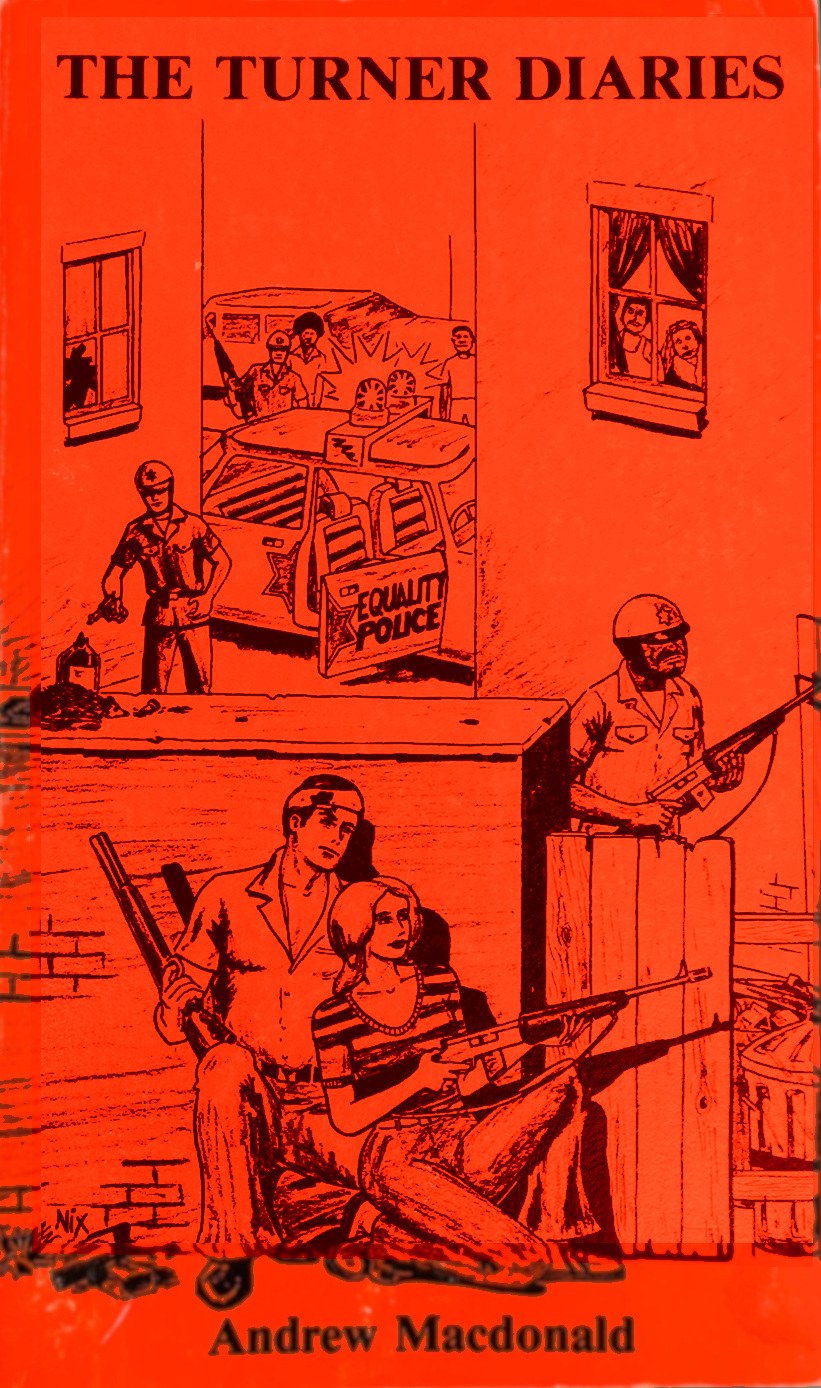
- Cover of the first edition illustrated by Dennis Nix
- Author: William Luther Pierce (as Andrew Macdonald)
- Illustrator: Dennis Nix
- Language: English
- Genre: Political novel; Dystopian novel
- Publisher: National Alliance
- Publication date: 1978
- Publication place: United States
- Media type: Print (Paperback)
- Pages: 315 (1st ed.)
- ISBN: 0-937-94402-5 2nd edition, paperback
- OCLC: 36567649
- LC Class: PS3563.A2747
- Followed by: Hunter

The Turner Diaries is a 1978 novel by William Luther Pierce, the founder and chairman of the National Alliance, an American neo-Nazi group, published under the pseudonym Andrew Macdonald. It was serialized in the National Alliance publication Attack! from 1975–1978 before being published in paperback form by the National Alliance in 1978. As of 2001, the book had sold an estimated 300,000 copies, initially only available through mail order from the National Alliance. In 1996, it was republished by Barricade Books with a foreword that disavowed the novel.

It depicts a violent revolution in the United States, caused by a group called the Organization. The Organization's actions lead to the overthrow of the federal government, a nuclear war, and ultimately a race war which leads to the systematic extermination of non-whites and Jews worldwide. Whites viewed as "race traitors" are ultimately hanged in a mass execution called the "Day of the Rope". The novel utilizes a framing device, presenting the story as a historical diary of an average member, Earl Turner, with historical notes from a century after the novel's events.

The Turner Diaries was described as "explicitly racist and anti-Semitic" by The New York Times. The book has been influential in shaping white nationalism and the later development of the white genocide conspiracy theory. It has also inspired numerous hate crimes and acts of terrorism, including the crimes of The Order, the 1995 Oklahoma City bombing and the 1999 London nail bombings. It is estimated to have influenced perpetrators in over 200 killings.

== Plot ==
The story is told through Earl Turner's diary entries from September 16, 1991, to November 9, 1993 (originally the 1980s, but later editions push it up a decade). A future historian from 2099 (100 years after the events depicted) provides historical context for the novel's main text, presented as the journal of Earl Turner, an active but low-ranking member of a white nationalist movement known as the Organization. After the federal government has confiscated all civilian firearms in the country under the Cohen Act, the Organization goes underground to wage a guerrilla war against what they term the "System", a loose network of America's most powerful institutions of government, media, society, and finance, which are depicted as all being led by Jews. In response to the Organization's actions, the System begins implementing numerous repressive laws and new surveillance measures.

Turner plays a major role in the Washington, D.C. area. A former electrical engineer, he is skilled with technology, part of the Organization's communications, and sets up weaponry for its terrorist attacks. He helps facilitate the first large-scale attack by the Organization, in which they attack an FBI headquarters using a car bomb. Turner's service leads to his initiation into the Order, a secret higher-level organization within the Organization that secretly leads it. The Order gives inductees a poisonous capsule to kill themselves if captured.

Law enforcement raids Turner's hideout after he fails to maintain proper security practices. During an ensuing gun battle with authorities, everyone in the unit manages to escape except Turner, who is captured and nearly killed. He is arrested and sent to a military base for interrogation by the FBI and an Israeli intelligence officer. He is tortured for information on the Organization. Months later, other members of the Order rescue Turner. They inform him that the Order will give him a suicide mission in the future as punishment for breaking his oath. If he completes the mission successfully, the Order will forgive him, whether he lives or not; Turner accepts.

Eventually, the Organization seizes the nuclear weapons at Vandenberg Air Force Base in Southern California and targets missiles at New York City and Tel Aviv. While in control of California, the Organization ethnically cleanses the area of all non-whites by forcing them into the Eastern United States, which the System still controls. Meanwhile, hundreds of thousands of African Americans are forced into the desert to cause an economic crisis in the System's welfare system, and all Jews are beaten, lynched, or shot. The resulting racial conflict in the East causes many whites to "wake up" and begin fleeing to Southern California, which becomes a white ethnostate. Northern California also falls, but a conservative general rules under martial law and refuses to cooperate with the Organization.

The Organization raids the houses of all individuals reported to be race traitors, including white people who "defiled" their race by living with or marrying non-whites. These individuals are dragged from their homes and hanged in the streets of Los Angeles in an event which comes to be known as the "Day of the Rope" (August 1, 1993). The Organization then uses its Southern Californian base of operations and its nuclear weapons to open a wider war in which it launches nuclear strikes against New York City and Israel, initiates a nuclear exchange between the United States and the Soviet Union, and plants nuclear weapons and new combat units throughout North America. Many major U.S. cities are destroyed, including Baltimore and Detroit. Governments all over the world fall one by one, and violent anti-Jewish riots break out in the streets. Meanwhile, the United States is put under absolute martial law and transformed into a military dictatorship.

The United States government decides to invade the Organization's stronghold in Southern California. The leaders of the Order now inform Earl Turner of his punishment for having failed to resist interrogation: he must pilot an aircraft equipped with a nuclear warhead and destroy the Pentagon in a kamikaze-style suicide strike before the invasion can be launched. The 2099 epilogue summarizes how, after Turner's mission succeeded, the Organization conquered the rest of the world and eliminated all non-white people.

== Background ==
=== Author ===
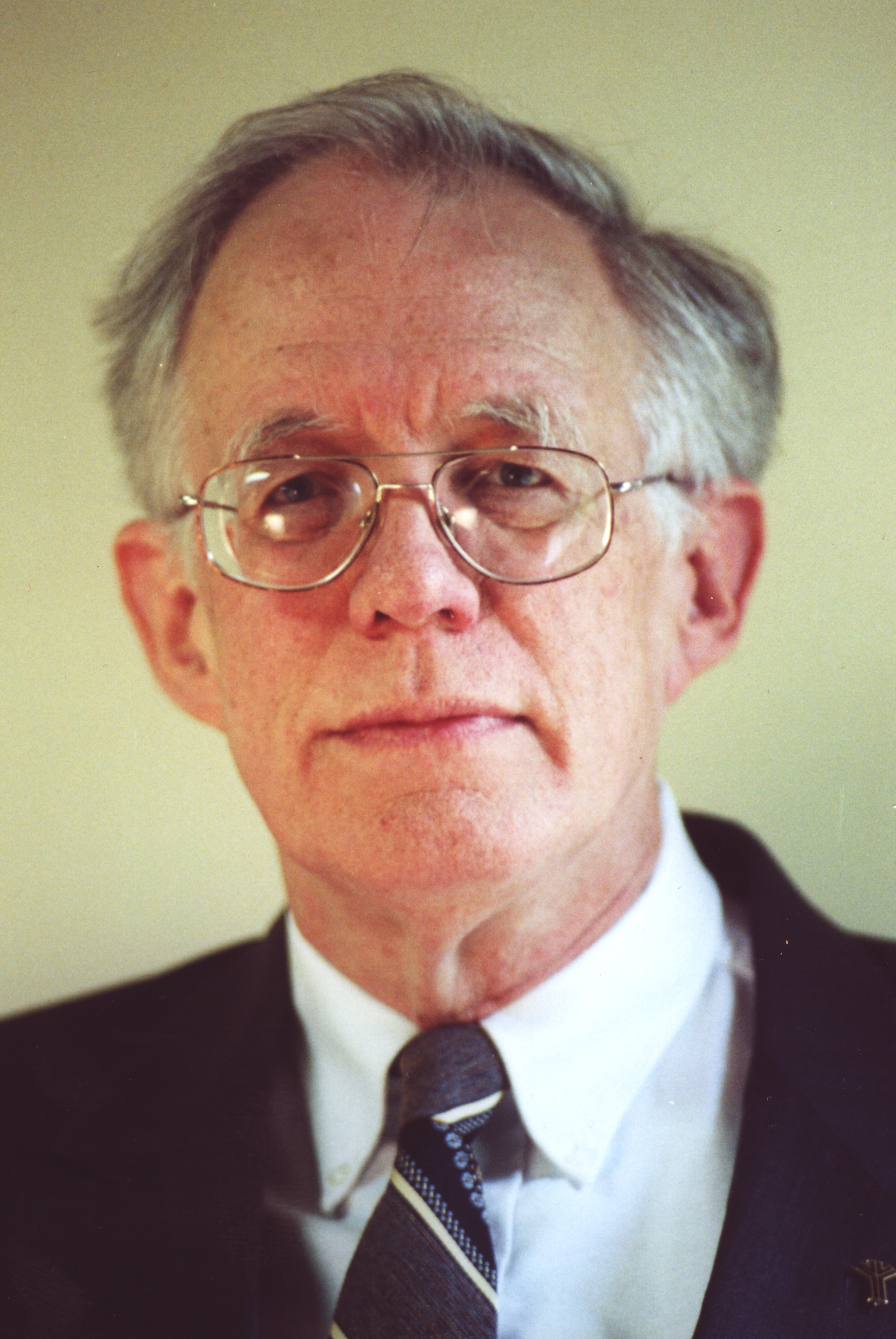
Pierce, pictured 2001

The Turner Diaries was written by William Luther Pierce. Pierce was both founder and leader of the National Alliance organization, which the Anti-Defamation League called in 2000 "the single most dangerous organized hate group in the United States today" (largely as a result of Pierce's authorship of The Turner Diaries). Pierce himself was said by the Southern Poverty Law Center to have been "America’s most important neo-Nazi" as well as "the movement’s fiercest antisemitic ideologue".

Pierce was a physicist who received his doctorate from the University of Colorado, and a former professor at Oregon State University. He was formerly a member of the John Birch Society (JBS), before leaving the JBS to become an affiliate of George Lincoln Rockwell and his American Nazi Party (ANP). He edited the ANP-affiliated magazine National Socialist World. After Rockwell's 1967 murder, Pierce became a member of the ANP's successor, the National Socialist White People's Party, before leaving due to several internal feuds and joining the National Youth Alliance (NYA). He edited their journal, Attack! When the NYA collapsed, Pierce founded the National Alliance out of what remained. With his schism from the NYA, he took over Attack!

Attack! had "Revolutionary Notes" which included practical advice for revolutionaries, including how to build bombs. Content in Attack! prior to The Turner Diaries used similar language to what was found in the book. For example, in late 1970 Pierce wrote:

the System which rules America today is on the way out [...] before a people can rid themselves of an unwholesome order of things, as a preparation for building a new and healthy order, they must be emotionally prepared to dispense with the old order

Pierce stated in a 1997 interview that at the time he had written The Turner Diaries, he had desired to put "all of the feminist agitators and propagandists and all of the race-mixing fanatics and all of the media bosses [...] up against a wall, in batches of a thousand or so at a time, and machine-gun them". He added that he still wished to do so. Pierce denied that he had written the book intending for it to function as a model for the depicted violent race war, and in a 1990 documentary Jacob Young directed about him, Dr. No?, claimed the book's portrayal of violence was entirely fictional. In his self-review of the book in 1978, he called it a "blueprint for victory".

=== Inspiration ===
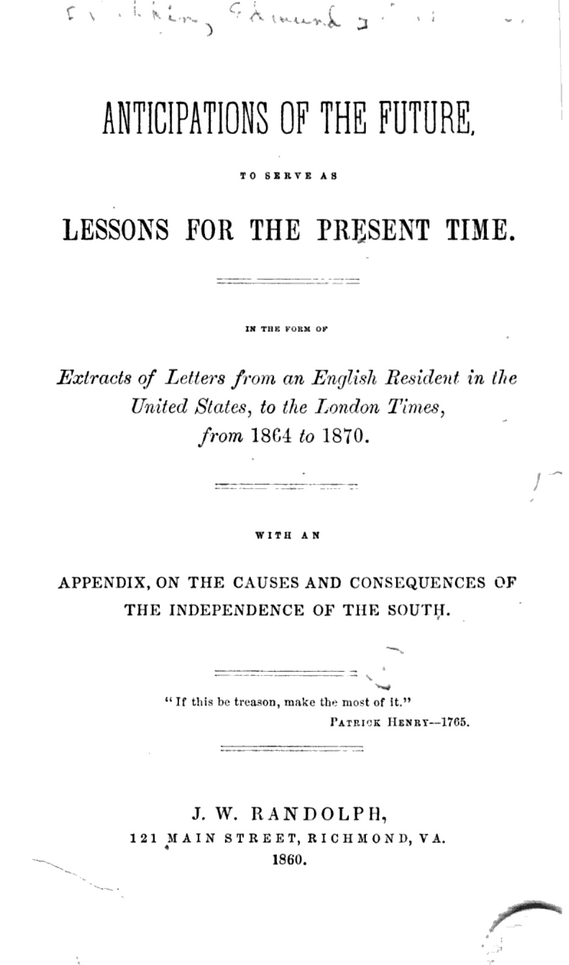
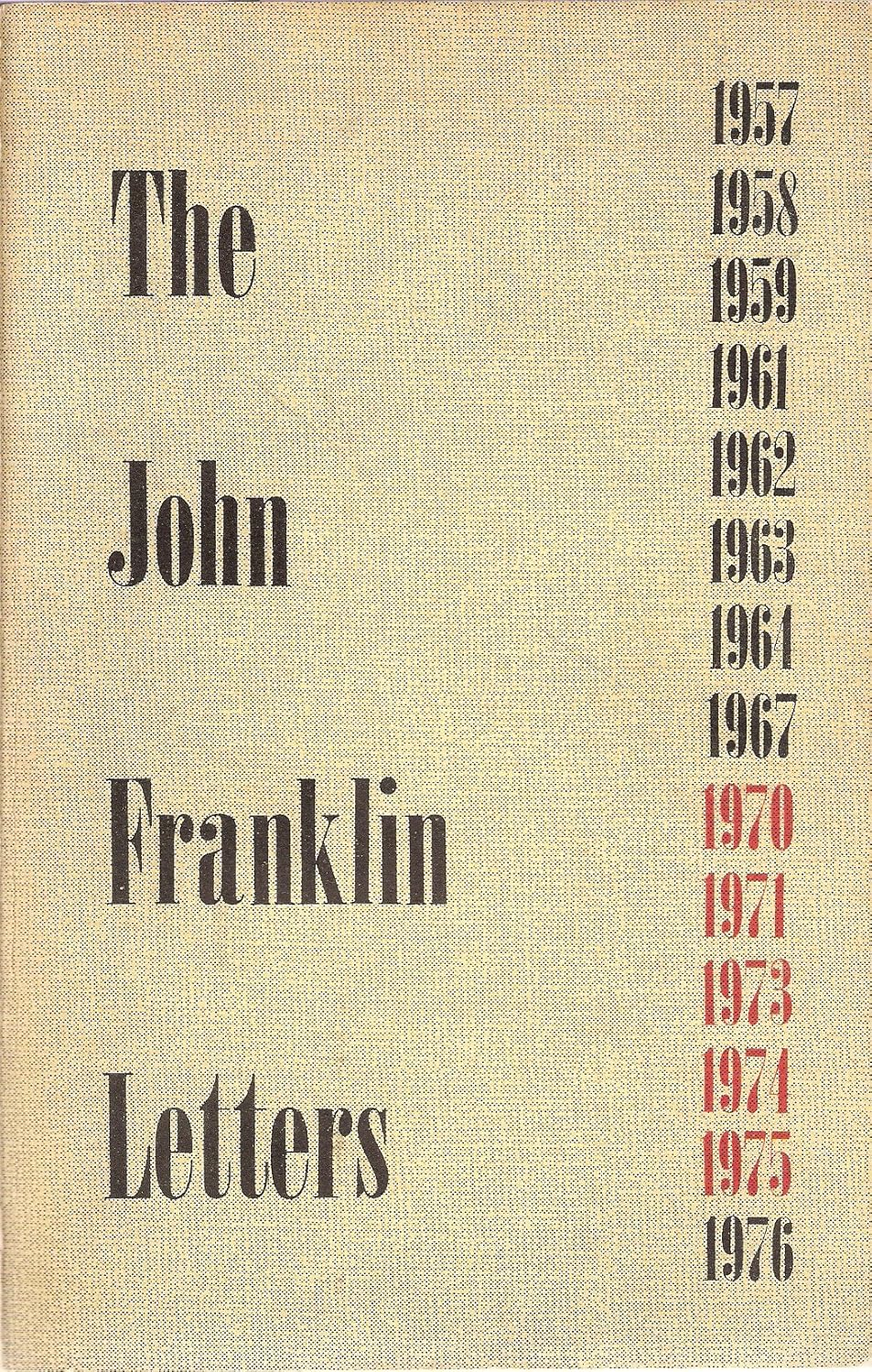
The covers of Anticipations of the Future (left) and The John Franklin Letters (right), both viewed as possible inspirations for The Turner Diaries

Pierce grew up as a fan of science fiction pulp novels, which have also been viewed as a possible influence on Turner. The book utilizes some science fiction tropes.

The Turner Diaries is a work of dystopian fiction; this genre emerged prominently in the early 19th century, and early dystopian novels often had racist themes. Terrorism researcher J.M. Berger connected Turner to several other racial dystopia novels, saying they had influenced Turner's development directly or indirectly (i.e. having been directly read by Pierce, or having inspired works that he read). He particularly noted The Turner Diaries as having "striking similarities" with the book Anticipations of the Future.

Jack London's 1907 novel The Iron Heel has also been seen as an influence; The Turner Diaries shares some themes, descriptions and its main narrative device (that of a work annotated by a future historian) with that book. Pierce disputed that this book was an influence. The 1969 novel The Spook Who Sat by the Door by black author Sam Greenlee is also seen as a possible influence on The Turner Diaries; the release of its film adaption was controversial and widely publicized. It follows the first black CIA agent, who then uses his knowledge to lead a black insurgency against the CIA. Greenlee described it as "a training manual for guerrilla warfare", and all white characters in the book are racists who have exclusively hostile interactions with the protagonists.

In Pierce's authorized biography The Fame of a Dead Man's Deeds, the anonymous 1959 novel The John Franklin Letters was cited by Pierce as the most direct inspiration for the novel. Pierce was given this book by Revilo P. Oliver, who is considered the most probable author of The John Franklin Letters. Oliver had written a review for Attack! In a meeting, probably in late 1974, Pierce expressed to Oliver that he was having difficulty getting people to respond to his message. Oliver suggested he write fiction, something Pierce had not previously done, arguing that the kinds of people who would agree with Pierce's views were not the kind of people who would read the non-fiction material Pierce had previously written. Oliver suggested that Pierce write in a genre enjoyed by the people who Pierce's ideas would appeal to, which Oliver said was "fiction, and particularly light, action-filled recreational fiction". Similar to The John Franklin Letters, The Turner Diaries utilizes a framing device where the events are prefaced by an in-universe future historian.

While Pierce was writing The Turner Diaries, his favorite book was The Riot Makers: The Technology of Social Demolition by Eugene H. Methvin. That book was a right-wing survey of left-wing propaganda and tactics, which Methvin saw as instigating 1960s rioting; Methvin is critical and attempts to expose these tactics, especially the practice of what Methvin called "pre-conditioning". Pierce, however, saw in The Riot Makers a guide to making his own propaganda based on the very tactics Methvin was criticizing. Pierce believed reader identification was the key element in writing propaganda fiction. Pierce said:

Simply, the reader—or television watcher or movie viewer or playgoer—comes to identify with the protagonist. And once that happens, you’ve got this person where you want him.

== Publication history ==
The Turner Diaries was originally serialized in Attack! between 1975 and 1978, with one chapter released per issue during this period. The first issue of Attack! to serialize Turner was the January 1975 issue. The main story was originally set in the 1980s; Pierce changed it to the 1990s when the series was compiled to be published as a book.

Enthusiastic reactions among readers led Pierce to publish the story through the National Alliance as a paperback in 1978, under the pseudonym Andrew Macdonald. Its first edition was illustrated by artist Dennis Nix. The book was later distributed by the National Alliance's publishing arm National Vanguard Books. The third edition was published under Pierce's name rather than a pseudonym. When it was published, Pierce reviewed his own book in the National Vanguard (Attack!, later renamed). The periodical also sold the book.

In 1996, after the Oklahoma City bombing, Barricade Books published a new edition of the novel, including a foreword by the publisher denouncing it. Lyle Stuart, the owner of Barricade Books, was criticized by several organizations and individuals (among others, the SPLC, Morris Dees, the American Jewish Committee, the Simon Wiesenthal Center), who told major book chains to refuse to carry it. Dees stated that they had found the book in "almost every single case" of "white supremacy, neo-Nazi, Ku Klux Klan-type activity that resulted in violence that caused deaths and injuries to many innocent people". Stuart defended his decision to republish the book by saying "I felt it was important the average American see how sick these minds are and how dreadful and perverted their thinking process is". By the late 1990s, the book was widely distributed online.

A Finnish translation of the Turner Diaries was published in 1993 and sold by the National Democratic Party of Pekka Siitoin. A decade after the publication of The Turner Diaries, Pierce wrote another novel, Hunter, also under the pseudonym Andrew Macdonald. It was called by historian George Michael "in some ways the sequel to" the book. One interpretation of Hunter is that it is a prequel to the Turner Diaries, with the organization shown there becoming the Organization in Turner.

The book is prohibited in Canada as "obscene" and "hate propaganda" literature. The book was made illegal in France in 1999 because of its advocacy of racism, antisemitism and the use of violence. It has been banned in Germany since April 2006. In late 2020, online bookstore Amazon removed all new and used print and digital copies of The Turner Diaries from its bookselling platform, including all subsidiaries (AbeBooks, The Book Depository), effectively stopping sales of the title from the digital bookselling market. Although Amazon did not state a specific reason for the removal, it followed the company's purge of a number of self-published and small-press titles connected with QAnon from its platform. The book had previously been on Amazon with a disclaimer noting its history of being associated with terrorist acts.

=== Marketing and sales ===
The Turner Diaries was initially, until 1996, only sold via mail order from the National Alliance headquarters in West Virginia. Earlier versions of the book's blurb strongly emphasized the racist elements of the story:

This nightmare is coming true. Day by day conditions are coming closer to the nightmare world in which Earl Turner and his comrades struggle to overthrow a tyrannical, race-destroying System [...]

However, later advertisements and the book blurb later moved to emphasizing gun rights, and the book was widely spread at gun shows in the United States. Later blurbs emphasized the gun rights framing, and de-emphasized the racial element in an effort to expand the reach of the book. The later version of the book's blurb read:

What will you do when they come to take your guns? Earl Turner and his fellow patriots face this question and are forced underground when the U.S. government bans the private possession of firearms and stages the mass Gun Raids to round up suspected gun owners. The hated Equality Police begin hunting them down, but the patriots fight back with a campaign of sabotage and assassination. An all-out race war occurs as the struggle escalates. Turner and his comrades suffer terribly, but their ingenuity and boldness in devising and executing new methods of guerrilla warfare lead to a victory of cataclysmic intensity and worldwide scope.

It was also sold at some book stores, but its largest method of distribution was through gun shows and venues like the Soldier of Fortune Convention as well as mail order advertisements in related publications like Soldier of Fortune magazine and Shotgun News. It had sold 200,000 copies by the late 1990s according to self-estimates generally considered reliable by scholars. By the end of 1999 estimates were at 250,000 copies, and 2001 estimates were at 300,000 copies.

== Analysis ==
John Sutherland, in a 1996 essay for the London Review of Books, said of the work that it "is not the work of a Holocaust-denier (although Pierce gives us plenty of that) so much as a would-be Holocaust-repeater." The Turner Diaries was described as being "explicitly racist and anti-Semitic" by Peter Applebome of The New York Times. Applebome called it "by almost any standard [...] a chilling read", "almost compulsively violent". Ted Daniels said the characters were "pure cardboard, amounting to nothing more than names and actions, heroic or squalid according to Pierce’s racist morality" and that "death is the only life in this book." David Mills, writing for The Washington Post in 1993, said of Pierce's writings that "his prose style is dense, flat, artless. His imagination is bloodthirsty yet drained of passion. His ideology is insane." Mills further posited, "Pierce's philosophy [...] is not very far removed, historically, from the mainstream of Western thought."

The book is also critical of most white people—those who do not agree with neo-Nazism. The death of "many thousands of innocent people" as collateral damage is seen as acceptable, if a "heavy burden". Whites not of the Organization are presented in a harsh manner, portrayed as brainwashed and apathetic in contrast. Despite the book's explicitly racist messaging, any time the word racist appears in reference to the Organization, it is done in quotations as if a false accusation. Noah Berlatsky of the Los Angeles Review of Books said the book drew much from science fiction, saying that Pierce had "radicalized readers in part by radicalizing the tropes of popular pulp." Berlatsky argued that while recounting the plot it seemed cold, but that within the book Pierce justified it through science fiction concepts and references.

Historian Kathleen Belew described the book as a valuable lens which researchers should look through in order to understand white nationalists, but she argued that it must be understood in context when it is studied, because "It’s a book that has been used to kill a lot of people, over and over and over. [...] People should understand that’s what it is." Renee Brodie, writing for the Journal of American Culture, viewed the novel as having a premillennialist Christian ideology, with a "primarily apocalyptic" worldview as a whole, with the ethnically cleansed world at the end of the novel being paralleled by Macdonald with the Kingdom of God. Brodie wrote that by correlating Christian views with the Organization, the narrative shows the members of the group as having a "single-mindedness of purpose" that is "one of the main attractions found in The Turner Diaries". The System in the book is basically analogous to the Zionist Occupation Government (ZOG) conspiracy narrative.

== Legacy ==
The book was greatly influential in shaping white nationalism, and the later idea of the white genocide conspiracy theory. Terrorism analysts Bruce Hoffman and Jacob Ware said in their book God, Guns, and Sedition that "no other book has had so pervasive or sustained an influence over violent far-right extremism in the United States as The Turner Diaries." The New York Times noted its influence on white supremacists, describing some of its appeal as stemming from the book's "far-fetched" plot. Researcher Martin Durham argued that despite the instances of terrorism inspired by the book, Pierce's intention in writing it had probably not been to inspire such isolated cases earlier than he had wanted, with his aim instead having been to inspire "real, organized terrorism done according to plan, aimed at bringing down the government".

It was allegedly labeled the "bible of the racist right" by the FBI. While it is widely quoted, that statement is apocryphal and was likely authored by Pierce, not the FBI, for the purpose of publicity. The label was included on the back of the book in its 1985 edition. An actual 1991 memorandum from the FBI described it as "a significant work and foundation document closely embraced by the leadership as well as rank and file members of the Right-wing, White Supremist [sic] Movement".

The concept of the "Day of the Rope", in reference to the mass execution of "race traitors" in the novel, has also become common in white supremacist circles. The "Day of the Rope" concept is classified as a hate symbol in the Hate on Display hate symbols database of the Anti-Defamation League. The White Power band Bound for Glory referred to the phrase in their 1994 song "The Hammer Falls Again (Ragnarok)", with the lyrics saying:

Politicians to Pope, there'll be no hope / There is no escaping the Day of the Rope

=== Terrorism ===
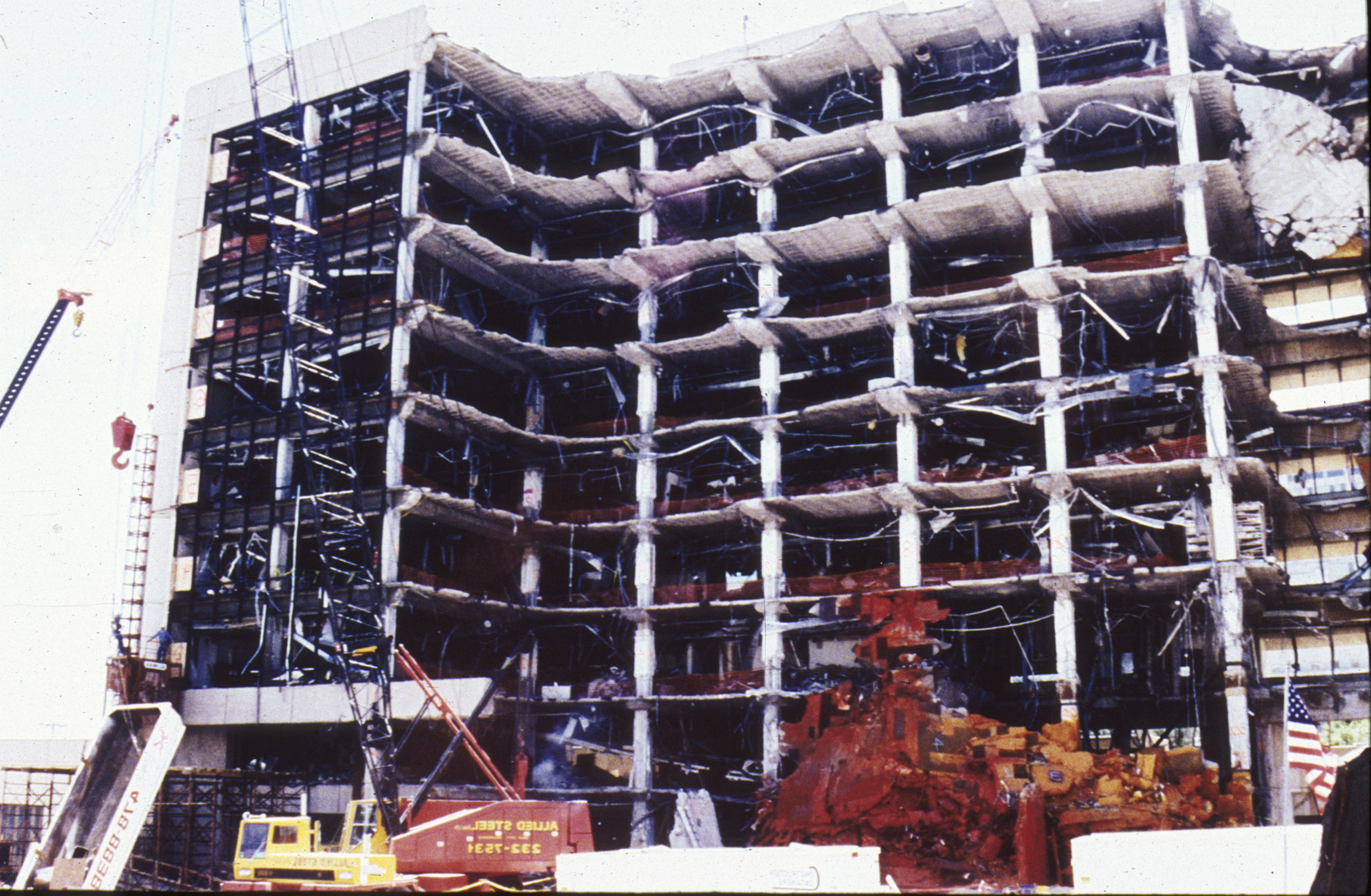
Photograph of the aftermath of the Oklahoma City bombing

The book has inspired numerous hate crimes and acts of terrorism. It is estimated to have influenced the perpetrators of over 200 murders.

In 1983, inspired by The Turner Diaries, three members of The Covenant, the Sword, and the Arm of the Lord plotted to bomb the Alfred P. Murrah Federal Building using a truck bomb; this plan did not go into action. Over a decade later in 1995, Timothy McVeigh perpetrated the Oklahoma City bombing killing 168 people, targeting the same Alfred P. Murrah building. He was found with a copy of the book with several phrases highlighted, including "But the real value of all of our attacks today lies in the psychological impact, not in the immediate casualties" and "We can still find them and kill them."

J.M. Berger noted there was "no clear indication that [McVeigh] subscribed to any specific white nationalist ideology, despite his fixation on the text." The book was the first piece of evidence introduced during his trial; witnesses testified that he was "obsessed" with the book, and sold it at gun shows. His attack was very similar to the truck bombing of the FBI headquarters in the book. After the bombing the book was brought to greater public attention. Mark Potok of the SPLC said in the aftermath that "William Pierce doesn’t build bombs. He builds bombers". Pierce's stated opinion on the bombing varied; at one time Pierce denounced the bombing as a "desperate and foolish" action, as it was not part of a sustained campaign of terror designed to overthrow the government and it had not been at the right time. At other times, he said he did approve of the bombing.

The book also inspired the formation of several violent groups. The Order (1983–1984) was a white supremacist, terrorist organization which named itself after the organization in the book. It formerly called itself The Organization. The Order murdered three people, including the talk radio host Alan Berg, and committed numerous robberies, counterfeiting operations, and acts of violence in an effort to provoke a race war in the United States. In 1994, the Aryan Republican Army committed a string of armed bank robberies, at least 22; they were inspired both by the fictional The Order within the book and The Order organization that had itself been inspired by The Turner Diaries. One statement they recorded encouraged watchers to read the book. Members were also linked to the Oklahoma City bombing. Chevie Kehoe formed the white supremacist group the Aryan People's Republic after he read The Turner Diaries, and eventually began a murder spree in which he killed five people before he was captured in an armed shootout with police in 1997. The German terrorist group National Socialist Underground used a German translation of The Turner Diaries (Turner Tagebücher) in forming at least part of their ideological basis. Several members murdered at least ten people in a decade long murder spree. A copy of the Turner Tagebücher was found on a computer used by the group, and most members had read it.

In 1996 Larry Wayne Shoemake committed a mass shooting against black people in Jackson, Mississippi, killing one and injuring seven. He had read both The Turner Diaries and Hunter. His wife stated that after Shoemake had read The Turner Diaries, he had never been the same. This resulted in Pierce being sued by the victims' families for inciting the attack (among other defendants in the suit), but Pierce was eventually dropped from the suit after the judge ruled the plaintiffs had failed to tie Pierce to the shooting.

In the wake of the January 6 United States Capitol attack, historian Kathleen Belew argued that the book was an inspiration to the rioters. She wrote that some actions in the attack appeared to be inspired by the book's "Day of the Rope" and an attack on Congress in the book. She wrote that the book "really becomes a clear point of reference if you look at the photographs of the action". Terrorism analysts Bruce Hoffman and Jacob Ware noted it as evoking the image of the "Day of the Rope".

Other individual acts tied to the book include:

- John William King, was convicted of dragging James Byrd, an African American, to his death in Jasper, Texas, in 1998. As King shackled Byrd's legs to his truck, he was reported to have said, "We're going to start The Turner Diaries early."
- David Copeland, a British neo-Nazi who killed three people in a bombing campaign against London's black and gay communities in 1999, quoted from The Turner Diaries while being interviewed by police.
- Jacob D. Robida, who attacked a gay bar in Massachusetts in 2006, before fleeing and killing his ex-girlfriend and a police officer before committing suicide, was found to have a copy of The Turner Diaries and other Nazi propaganda in his home.
- Paul Ross Evans, who attempted to bomb an abortion clinic in 2006, was found to have the book in his apartment.
- Peter Mangs, a serial killer who targeted immigrants in Sweden from 2009–2010, had read both The Turner Diaries and Hunter.
- Alexandr Koptsev stabbed 8 people in the Bolshaya Bronnaya Synagogue. Koptsev has been described as a racist skinhead and antisemitic neo-pagan. During a search of his house the police found a copy of The Turner Diaries.
- Pavlo Lapshyn, a Ukrainian who committed a racist murder in Britain in 2013, had an audiobook of The Turner Diaries and he also had a Russian translation of Hunter in his possession.
- White supremacist activist Frazier Glenn Miller Jr., who shot and killed three people at a Jewish community center in 2014, had praised the book.
- Zack Davies, who attempted to murder a Sikh man in a racist attack in Wales in 2015, was found to have a copy of The Turner Diaries and a copy of Hunter in his house.
- Ryan Christopher Palmeter, who shot and killed three African Americans in the 2023 Jacksonville shooting, mentioned the "Day of the Rope" in his manifesto.
- Caleb Vazquez, one of the shooters of the 2026 San Diego Mosque Shooting, had The Turner Diaries listed in his manifesto.

== See also ==
- The Camp of the Saints (1973) by Jean Raspail
- Ethnic Cleansing—Video game also published by the National Alliance
- RaHoWa, a concept of racial holy war against non-whites, created by Ben Klassen
- The Order (2024 film)
