= Lyle Munson =

US intelligence agent and book publisher

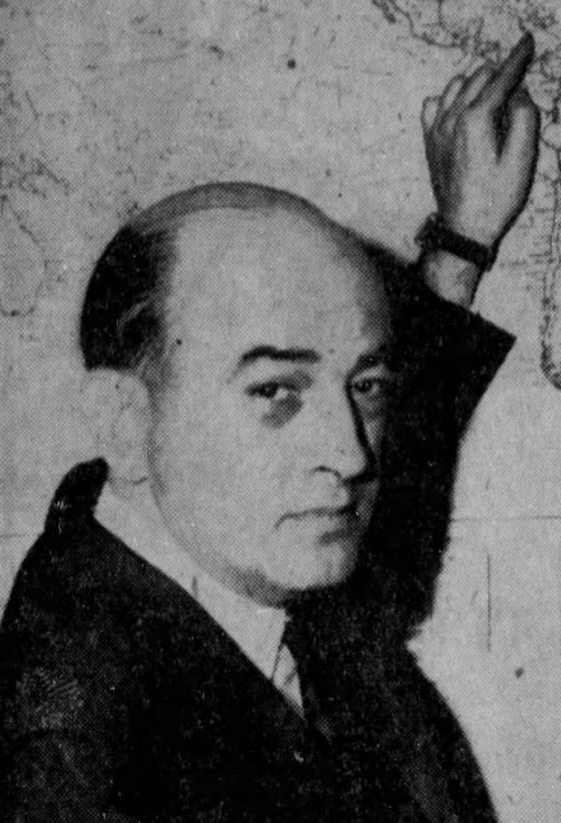
- Munson, pictured 1958
- Born: Lyle Hugh Munson; September 13, 1918; Moultrie County, Illinois, U.S.
- Died: November 1, 1973 (aged 55); Mattoon, Illinois, U.S.
- Other name: The Bookmailer
- Education: University of Illinois
- Spouse: Anne Roberts (m. 1939)
- Children: 2

Lyle Hugh Munson (September 13, 1918 – November 1, 1973) was an American intelligence agent and then, later, a book publisher and distributor under the corporate name The Bookmailer, Inc. Based in the New York area, his company was known particularly for offering right-wing and anti-communist works. Robert W. Welch Jr., the head of the John Birch Society, considered him a "good friend". He was involved in the John Paton Davies Jr. affair, which led to Davies's ultimate dismissal as a diplomat.

== Early life ==
Lyle H. Munson was born in Moultrie County, Illinois, on September 13, 1918, to Faye Young Munson and Bruce Munson. He had a brother, David. He graduated from the University of Illinois in 1942. He served with the United States Army, including on the Berlin Airlift.

== Intelligence ==
Munson worked for the Office of Strategic Services starting in 1940, and in the CIA's psychological warfare division. In 1949, he testified before the Senate Internal Security Subcommittee. He was at that time the CIA's plans officer for psychological warfare and covert activity in the Far East.

He was involved in the John Paton Davies Jr. affair. Munson had met Davies in 1949, in a period where the U.S. was looking for better ways to keep tabs on developments in China. Munson believed that the US's policy in the Far East was misguided, and believed Davies was trying to subvert the American government with communist sympathizers. As a result, he leaked the information on some of Davies's actions to Alfred Kohlberg, and they ultimately made their way to Robert J. Morris.

George F. Kennan wanted Munson to be fired for breaching security, and insisted as such to the CIA. Munson was dismissed; frustrated, Munson told another side of the story placing blame on Davies. This resulted in Davies being indicted for perjury, but not convicted, and him ultimately being dismissed. Another telling says Munson resigned in protest over how the case was handled, feeling they were not taking communism seriously enough. He then got another job with army intelligence, but stopped being an intelligence agent altogether in 1952.

== Book publishing ==
After leaving the CIA, he decided to work in book publishing with a focus on anti-communism. He first became president of the Swen Publications Company. Under the pseudonym Hans Muller, he wrote Communist Zoo, published in 1951 by Swen. The book features animal pictures with captions that mock communism.

Munson was the head of The Bookmailer, a small right-wing publishing house, founded in 1952. During the 29 years of its existence, Bookmailer published around fifty books on its own, in addition to distributing books published by small publishers. They were based in New York City, changing offices after an April 18, 1961, burglary. In 1964, they moved to Linden, New Jersey.

The company was 20% owned by P. C. Beezley. Sales circa 1960 were about 200,000 volumes per year, and grew to around 2 million in 1961 off of a wave of interest in anti-communist material. The Bookmailer sold as a set for $100 a 35 volume "freedom library". Employees included Herbert Romerstein. Munson was editor of Bookmailer's publication "For the Skeptic", which was a collection of readings aimed to "help you to understand the mechanics of the Communist spy apparatus and its successes"; this was promoted by the John Birch Society. In 1957, The Bookmailer offered to, with every purchase of In the Court of Public Opinion by Alger Hiss give a copy of Whittaker Chambers' book Witness. He made this offer to several newspaper columnists 10 days before the book was published.

Robert W. Welch Jr., the head of the John Birch Society, considered him a "good friend", appreciating his publishing of anti-communist material. According to Russell Kirk, Bookmailer advertising was turned down by conservative journal Modern Age because his advertising agent had a Jewish name.

=== Books published ===
- Attack by Mail
- Communism and Your Child by Herbert Romerstein
- No Wonder We Are Losing by Robert Morris
- No Army, No Navy, No Air Force, an edition of Freedom from War: the United States Program for General and Complete Disarmament in a Peaceful World (Department of State publication 7277) intended to stoke protests against US moves toward disarmament
- The John Franklin Letters, published anonymously but probably written by Revilo P. Oliver
- Major Jordan's Diaries by George Racey Jordan with Richard L. Stokes (reprint edition)
- The World's Most Orphaned Nation by Joseph Cardinal Mindszenty
- A volume of speeches by US Senator Thomas J. Dodd

== Personal life ==
Munson married Anne Roberts (born 1920) on July 10, 1939. They had two children, Donna and Katherine. Munson and Anne moved from New Jersey to Mattoon, Illinois, less than a year before his death. After he passed, Anne started her own by-mail bookselling operation, Munson Books.

== Death ==
He retired shortly before his death on November 1, 1973, at the age of 55, in Mattoon, Illinois. He was buried in Smyser Cemetery.
