= Revilo P. Oliver =

American far-right activist (1908–1994)

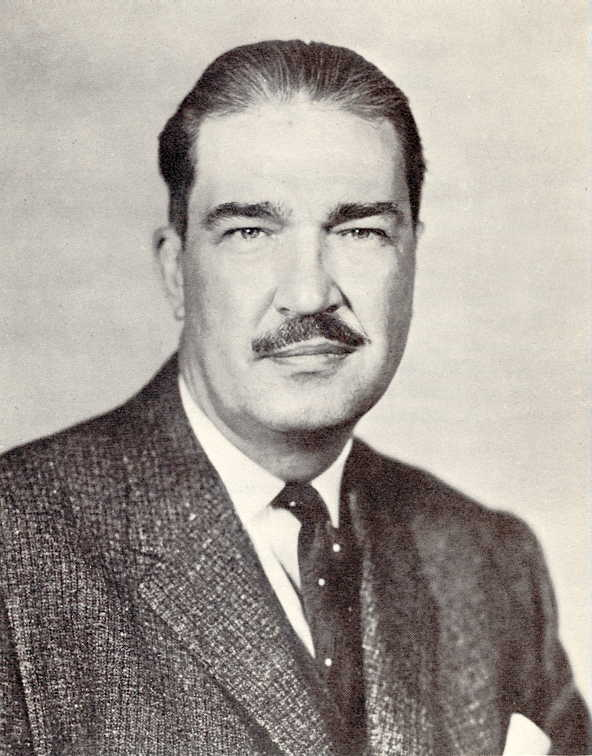
- Oliver in 1963
- Born: Revilo Pendleton Oliver; July 7, 1908; Iowa Park, Texas, U.S.
- Died: August 20, 1994 (aged 86); Urbana, Illinois, U.S.
- Education: University of Illinois Urbana-Champaign
- Occupations: Author, professor, commentator
- Spouse: Grace Needham (m. 1930)
- Writing career
- Pen name: Ralph Perrier; Paul Knutson
- Subjects: American conservatism, anti-communism, antisemitism

Revilo Pendleton Oliver (July 7, 1908 – August 20, 1994) was an American professor of Classical philology, Spanish, and Italian at the University of Illinois at Urbana-Champaign. He was a founding member of the John Birch Society in 1958, where he published in its magazine, American Opinion, before resigning in 1966. He was a polemicist for right-wing, white supremacist and antisemitic causes. He later advised the Holocaust denial group the Institute for Historical Review.

Oliver attracted national notoriety in the 1960s when he published an article after the President John F. Kennedy assassination, alleging that Lee Harvey Oswald was part of a Soviet conspiracy against the United States. He was called to testify before the Warren Commission investigating the murder.

== Life and career ==
=== Early life ===
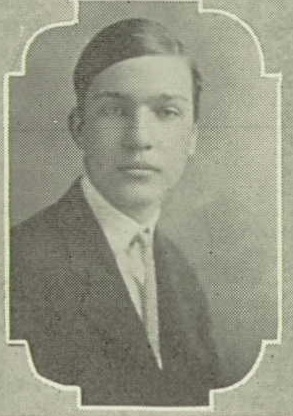
Oliver in a 1926 yearbook photo

Revilo Pendleton Oliver was born July 7, 1908, in Iowa Park, Texas, to Revilo P. Oliver and Flora R. Long. "Revilo P. Oliver" is a palindrome—a phrase that reads the same backwards and forwards. Oliver wrote that his name had been, in his family, "the burden of the eldest or only son for six generations". Colleagues at the University of Illinois later joked that "his first name is his last name spelled backward because he doesn’t know if he’s coming or going".

He was raised and experienced his early education in California and Louisiana, before his family relocated to Illinois, where he attended high school for two years. With his family, he then moved to California, where aged 16 he entered Pomona College in Claremont.

=== Academia ===
In 1930, Oliver married Grace Needham. He returned to Illinois, where he attended the University of Illinois Urbana-Champaign and studied under William Abbott Oldfather. His first book was an annotated translation, from the Sanskrit, of Mricchakatika (The Little Clay Cart), published by the University of Illinois in 1938. He received his PhD in 1940. That same year, the university published his Ph.D. thesis: Niccolò Perotti's Translations of the Enchiridion, which was republished in 1954 as Niccolo Perotti's Version of the Enchiridion of Epictetus.

He received Fulbright and Guggenheim fellowships. Oliver began teaching graduate classes. For a number of years he also gave graduate courses in the Renaissance, teaching in the Departments of Spanish and Italian. He said he read 11 languages.

Oliver worked in a military intelligence unit in the Signal Services during World War II as a cryptanalyst for the Army Security Agency from 1942 to 1945. Following the war, he returned to Urbana, and joined the staff of the University of Illinois in 1945 as an assistant professor, became an associate professor in 1947, and professor in 1953. He retired in 1977 from the University of Illinois as a professor emeritus.

=== Conservative movement ===
Oliver was an early book reviewer for National Review from 1956 until May 1960 when he was ousted by its editor, William F. Buckley Jr., for his public antisemitism. Oliver also wrote for The American Mercury. Buckley, who aimed to make conservatism more respectable to Americans averse to antisemitism and extremism, kept a close friendship with Oliver but acknowledged privately that Oliver was antisemitic.

In 1958, Oliver joined as a founding member of Robert W. Welch Jr.'s John Birch Society, an anti-communist organization. He was a member of its national board and associate editor of its magazine, American Opinion. When Buckley repudiated Welch and the John Birch Society, the repudiation drove a wedge in Buckley's friendship with Oliver.

Oliver is considered the likely author of the 1959 novel The John Franklin Letters, which focuses on an insurgency overthrowing a corrupt American government. The book was published in 1959 by The Bookmailer. It was distributed by the John Birch Society (JBS), which contributed to its popularity. No author was listed for the book and it included no publishing information. The book was edited by Harley N. Ogden, a professor at the same university as Oliver. The book displays many racial grievances but ultimately has a positive ending where the insurgents win and one of their own, a black man, becomes president. Kaplan noted that, given his later views, "one assumes that Oliver eventually found that the racially harmonious denouement of The John Franklin Letters to be a bit of an embarrassment".

After the assassination of President John F. Kennedy, Oliver wrote a two-part article called "Marxmanship in Dallas" published in March 1964 in American Opinion, the Birch magazine. It alleged that Lee Harvey Oswald had carried out the murder as part of a communist conspiracy to kill Kennedy, whom Oliver described as a puppet who had outlived his usefulness. He also criticized Kennedy, writing that his "memory will be cherished with distaste". The University of Illinois held a vote on whether to fire him for the affair (as they had fired biologist Leo Koch four years earlier for promoting premarital sex). In March 1964, Oliver was reprimanded by the University of Illinois' Board of Trustees, but was allowed to keep his position after a vote came down in overwhelming favor of keeping him. Oliver testified in the fall of that year before the Warren Commission.

=== White supremacy ===
In a Boston rally on July 2, 1966, Oliver embarrassed Welch by proclaiming at a speech that: "If only by some miracle all the Bolsheviks or all the Illuminati or all the Jews were vaporized at dawn tomorrow, we should have nothing to worry about". Alleging that Welch had tricked him or sold out to Zionist interests, he decried what he called "the Birch hoax". He was "forced to resign" from the society on July 30, 1966. Oliver later claimed in 1981 to have discovered that Welch "was merely the nominal head of the Birch business, which he operated under the supervision of a committee of Jews". From the 1960s until his death, Oliver produced essays alleging Jewish conspiracies. In his book Blood and Politics, Leonard Zeskind calls Oliver "the person responsible for introducing the idea of a conspiracy by the Illuminati into Birch circles."

Oliver subsequently became involved with Willis Carto's National Youth Alliance (NYA). Oliver mentored William Luther Pierce, founder of the National Alliance and author of The Turner Diaries. The John Franklin Letters was cited by Pierce – given the book to read by Oliver – as his most direct inspiration for The Turner Diaries. Oliver also mentored the neo-Nazi activist Kevin Alfred Strom. "Oliver's writings on Jews and race-mixing became an important part of neo-Nazi culture in the early twenty-first century," according to Andrew S. Winston of the University of Guelph.

In 1978, Oliver became an editorial adviser for the Institute for Historical Review, an organization devoted primarily to Holocaust denial. He was also a regular contributor to Liberty Bell, an explicitly National Socialist magazine operated by George P. Dietz. He perhaps wrote more for Liberty Bell than any other periodical. He also wrote for the white supremacist magazine Instauration. He used the pen names "Ralph Perier" (for The Jews Love Christianity and Religion and Race) and "Paul Knutson" (for Aryan Asses). Oliver claimed to have advised the Introduction (credited to Willis Carto) to the Noontide Press edition of Francis Parker Yockey's Imperium. Carto denied this.

Although originally a proponent that Christianity is essential to Western civilization, Oliver became convinced that Christianity, by promoting universality and brotherhood rather than racial survival, was itself a Jewish product and part of the conspiracy. Oliver repeatedly criticized Christianity in Liberty Bell as "Jewish superstition", calling it a "Jewish invention", "cancer", and a "mental virus". This drew critical responses from Donald V. Clerkin, a Christian contributor, who wrote an essay defending Christianity from a racist point of view. Oliver wrote a rebuttal, and only further intensified his attacks on Christianity in the periodical from then on. Damon T. Berry, in his book Blood and Faith: Christianity and American White Nationalism devotes a chapter to Oliver, concluding that "Oliver hated both conservativism and Christianity ... because they equally represented to him an ideological poison that was alien to the best instincts of the white race to defend its existence."

=== Later years and death ===
On August 20, 1994, suffering from leukemia and severe emphysema, he died at the age of 86 in Urbana, Illinois.

Lawyer Sam Dickson held a memorial service in honor of him; attending were many of his associates, including David Duke. They declared themselves Oliver's "spiritual children", Oliver having never had any biological children.

Following his death, the neo-Nazi Kevin Alfred Strom, one of his associates, became the archivist of Oliver's far-right writings, and maintains a website for them.

His estate arranged to publish several works posthumously through Historical Review Press and Liberty Bell Publications, as well as to attend to the needs of his wife Grace in her declining years.

== Bibliography ==
- The Little Clay Cart. Urbana: University of Illinois Press (1938).
- Niccolò Perotti's Translations of the Enchiridion. University of Illinois Press (1940).
- The John Franklin Letters (1959); anonymous work, is considered to be the likely author
- History and Biology. Griff Press (1963).
- All America Must Know the Terror that Is Upon Us. Bakersfield: Conservative Viewpoint (1966); Liberty Bell Publications (1975).
- Conspiracy or Degeneracy?. Power Products (1967).
- Christianity and the Survival of the West. Sterling, VA: Sterling Enterprises (1973).
  - Reprinted, with new postscript: Cape Canaveral: Howard Allen (1978). ISBN 978-0914576129.
- The Jews Love Christianity. Liberty Bell Publications (1980). Published under the pseudonym "Ralph Perrier."
- America's Decline: The Education of a Conservative. London: Londinium Press (1981).
  - Reprinted: Historical Review Press (1983). ISBN 0906879655.
- The Enemy of Our Enemies. Liberty Bell Publications (1981).
- "Populism" and "Elitism". Liberty Bell Publications (1982). ISBN 978-0942094015.
- Christianity Today: Four Articles. Liberty Bell Publications (1987). OCLC 166141772.
- The Yellow Peril. Liberty Bell Publications (1983). ISBN 0942094115.

=== Published posthumously ===
- The Origins of Christianity. Historical Review Press (1994).
- Reflections on the Christ Myth. Historical Review Press (1994).
- The Origins of Christianity Historical Review Press (2001).
- The Jewish Strategy. Palladian Books (2002).
- Against the Grain. Liberty Bell Publications (2004)
