= Journal of Intelligence History =

- Discipline: Espionage
- Language: English
- Edited by: Chris Moran, Shlomo Shpiro

Publication details
- History: 2001-present
- Publisher: Taylor & Francis
- Frequency: Biannual

Standard abbreviations
- ISO 4: J. Intell. Hist.

Indexing
- ISSN: 1616-1262 (print); 2169-5601 (web)
- LCCN: 2006205996
- OCLC no.: 809122241

Links
- Journal homepage; Online access; Online archive

The Journal of Intelligence History is a biannual peer-reviewed academic journal covering the history of espionage. It was established in 2001 and is the official journal of the International Intelligence History Association. The journal is published by Taylor & Francis and the editors-in-chief are Chris Moran (University of Warwick) and Shlomo Shpiro (Bar-Ilan University). Scholars have acknowledged its role.
