= Sarah Jaffe (journalist) =

Labor journalist

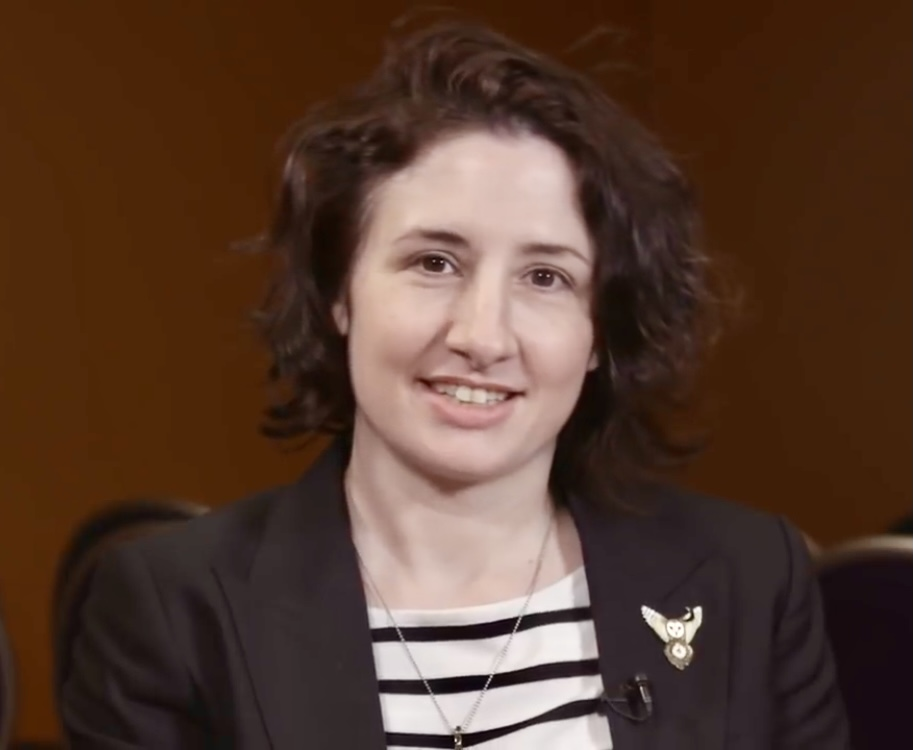
- Jaffe in 2018
- Education: Loyola University New Orleans; Temple University
- Occupation: Journalist
- Notable work: Necessary Trouble; Work Won't Love You Back
- Website: sarahljaffe.com

Sarah L. Jaffe is an American labor journalist. She is the author of Necessary Trouble: Americans in Revolt (2016) and Work Won't Love You Back: How Devotion to Our Jobs Keeps Us Exploited, Exhausted and Alone (2021), and most recently From the Ashes: Grief and Revolution in a World on Fire (2024). Jaffe is a columnist for The Progressive and New Labor Forum, and her work has appeared in such outlets as The New York Times, The Washington Post, The Atlantic, The Guardian, and The New Republic. She also cohosts a podcast called Belabored for Dissent magazine.

== Early life ==
Jaffe was born in 1980. She attended college at Loyola University New Orleans, where she studied English. She earned a master's degree in journalism from Temple University in Philadelphia.

== Career ==
Jaffe initially wanted to be a novelist or screenwriter, but when she graduated into the early 2000s recession, she ended up working as a waitress and in retail jobs for five years. Her writing career began as a feminist blogger, and then she developed an interest in reporting on labor issues. Journalist and activist Kim Kelly describes Jaffe as “one of labor’s leading voices and guiding lights.” Jaffe cohosts the Dissent magazine podcast Belabored with Michelle Chen. She was previously web director at GRITtv with Laura Flanders.

In 2019 Jaffe was a Poynter Fellow at Yale University. She has also been a Type Media Center fellow.

=== Necessary Trouble ===
In 2016, Jaffe published Necessary Trouble: Americans in Revolt with Nation Books. It looks at the preceding decade of activism in the United States, from Occupy Wall Street through the Tea Party movement to Black Lives Matter. Jaffe argues these protests should be understood as based in economic discontent, although with a critical lens toward the figure of the white male worker that economic populism has historically centered. Reviewing the book for The New York Times, Vann R. Newkirk II says Necessary Trouble "focuses on those left out of the struggle between traditional populism and corporations, including women and people of color, and her book finds the thread of economic injustice in every tapestry it weaves."

=== Work Won't Love You Back ===
In 2020, Jaffe published her second book, Work Won't Love You Back: How Devotion to Our Jobs Keeps Us Exploited, Exhausted and Alone with Bold Type Books. It described the lives of ten people with a wide range of different jobs, using critiques of emotional labor to account for increasingly demanding jobs that are not accompanied by increased financial compensation. Jaffe “examines and critiques the 'labor of love' ideology that insists if we’re passionate about work, we’re not working at all,” writes Mary Retta in a review for Bitch magazine. Jaffe argues that this logic makes workers like teachers, “'the ultimate laborers of love,’ ... expected to undergo unfair work conditions, including low pay and long hours because they love their students.” Further, she suggests it silences critique because low-paid (or unpaid) workers in their “dream job” in the non-profit world, internships, or academia are seen as ungrateful if they question the power arrangement in their work and who it serves: “We’re supposed to work for the love of it ... and how dare we ask questions about the way our work is making other people rich while we struggle to pay rent.” Ultimately, Retta finds “one of Jaffe’s most interesting points is made in her discussion of our unrequited love for labor has perverted our ability to love other human beings,” with work absorbing more and more affective investment and leaving little room for personal relationships, which Jaffe urges readers to resist, writing, “What I believe, and want you to believe too...is that love is too big and beautiful and grand and messy and human a thing to be wasted on a temporary fact of life like work.”

The book received praise from reviewers. Retta says its January 2021 release during the economic upheaval of the COVID-19 pandemic meant the book “is arriving at the perfect time”. In The Guardian, Tim Adams likewise felt it was “an extremely timely analysis.” Publishers Weekly called it a “a noteworthy and persuasive call for returning to a more pragmatic view of work.”
