= Women in conservatism in the United States =

American women in politics

Women in conservatism in the United States have advocated for social, political, economic, and cultural conservative policies going as far back as the anti-suffragism movement of the 1860s. Conservative women's political action frequently takes an anti-feminist stance; and debate around women’s role in society frequently dictates political action taken by conservative women. Conservative activist Phyllis Schlafly argued against women’s suffrage, on the basis that it was women's privileged nature to remain in the home and out of the workplace. Gender essentialism, or the presence of innate differences between the sexes, is central to Schlafly's "essential nature" arguments, and this thread of belief can be found throughout women’s history in conservative politics.

The evolution of gender essentialism in conservative politics can be seen in Vice Presidential Nominee and Alaskan Governor Sarah Palin self-identifying as a feminist, and adopting a maternal stance to balance her more traditionally masculine positions in political leadership. Today, notable female conservative activists and conservative women’s organizations, such as Concerned Women for America and the Independent Women’s Forum continue advancing conservative policies in the U.S and remain influenced by gender essentialism in their activism.

== History ==
=== Anti-suffragism ===
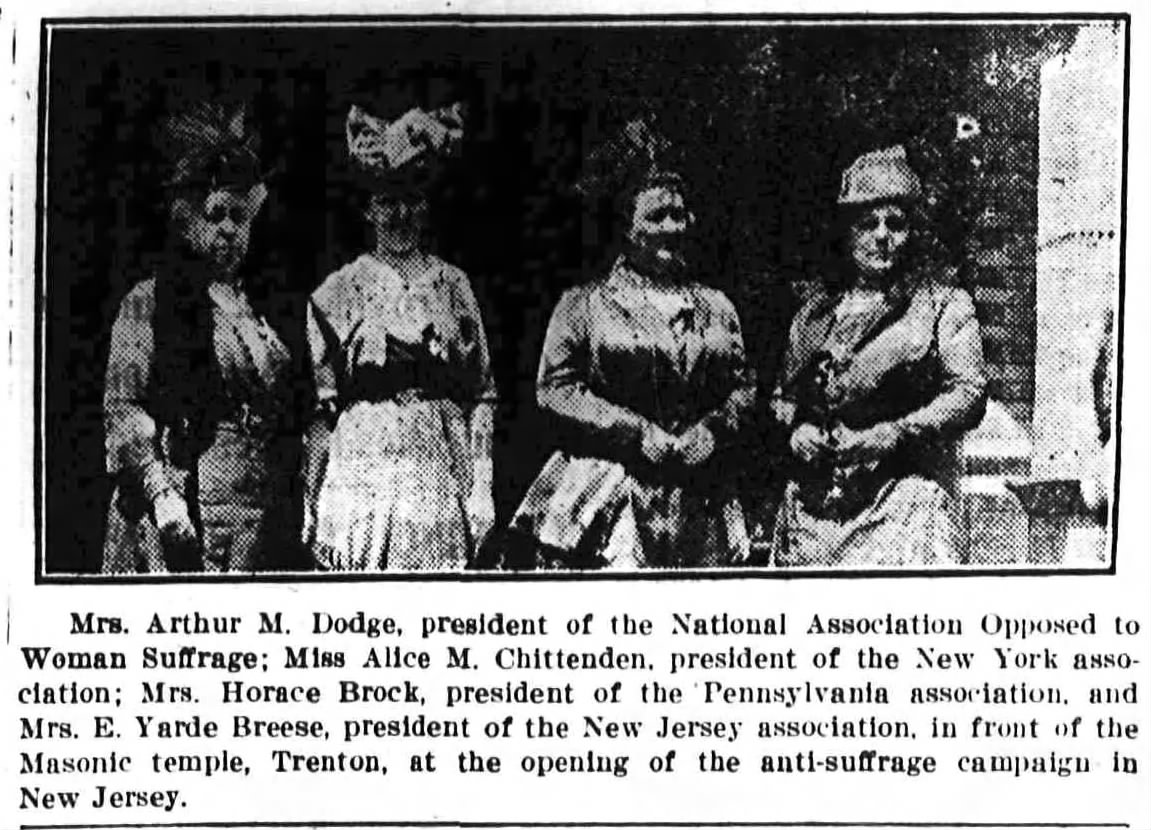
Anti-suffrage women leaders Arthur M. Dodge, Alice M. Chittenden, Horace Brock and E. Yarde Breese

Women first began to oppose suffrage in Massachusetts in 1868. They succeeded in blocking the proposal, and this caused the movement to gain momentum. The National Association Opposed to Women Suffrage (NAOWS) was formed by Josephine Dodge in 1911. NAOWS primarily consisted of wealthy women who were often wives of politicians. These women helped defeat nearly 40 suffrage proposals, and published the Women's Protest to voice their agenda nationwide. Dodge and the organization argued for women to remain out of the political sphere, and instead be more efficient and diligent in "work for which her nature and her training fit her." These anti-feminist beliefs are what shaped the anti-suffrage crusade.

=== Postwar Era ===
In the early 1950s, local activist movements against liberal education reforms became an early source of organization for conservative women. As progressive school administrators attempted to desegregate public schools and implement non-traditional teaching methods, grassroots organizations run primarily by women mobilized to oppose these measures. Such organizations notably succeeded in ousting Pasadena superintendent Willard Goslin and Houston deputy superintendent George Ebey, attracting national media attention. Many conservative women were attracted to this cause, as the issue involved key principles for the emerging American conservative movement: traditionalism, anti-communism, and a skepticism of 'big government'. Women were well-positioned through their role as housewives to portray themselves as protectors of their local community and the principle of home rule against outsiders trying to radically transform children's education. In order to organize these local-level campaigns against education reforms, women activists created conservative political networks and study groups that would facilitate future advocacy of conservative causes.

Throughout the postwar period, women continued to be heavily involved in organizations of conservative activists. After campaigns against progressive education reform galvanized conservative women in the early 1950s, many began to join the John Birch Society (JBS) and associated organizations after the formation of the JBS in 1958. While the JBS maintained a rigidly patriarchal structure, with many chapters only allowing women to serve coffee and food at their meetings instead of active participation, the organization helped to direct attention and resources toward other conservative groups dominated by women.

Among the conservative groups of the period, particularly in the hotbed of southern California, conservative bookstores were a particularly effective institution for channeling the activist energies of conservative women. These stores sold polemics, novels, memoirs, and bumper stickers, all with an explicitly conservative (and anti-communist) bent. Sales served to disseminate information and bring in money for conservative organizations. Many of these stores were staffed and run primarily by women, often affiliated with the John Birch Society.

=== Goldwater campaign ===
A significant source of conservative women's activism was in southern California in the 1950s and 1960s, particularly in Orange County, California. Female conservative activists organized around their opposition to internationalism, Communism, and the welfare state. These women mainly consisted of "suburban warriors," or middle-class housewives who feared Christian values in America were under attack. Female conservative activists in southern California harnessed the preexisting culture of volunteerism and civic engagement, which largely revolved around women and their schedules, to mobilize for their causes. Increasing Cold War tensions and fears of Communism allowed these women to mobilize groups such as the John Birch Society and the American Civil Liberties Union to pursue their political agendas. Many women first found political community in Republican women's clubs. The Republican Party of the time emphasized inherent differences between the sexes, and its sex-segregated local organizations provided a political network for conservative suburban women.

Conservative women, particularly those in grassroots organizations, supported Arizona Senator Barry Goldwater and successfully campaigned for him to become the presidential candidate for the Republican Party in 1964. Many women were mobilized in support of Goldwater's primary campaign after reading A Choice Not an Echo, a pro-Goldwater book written by young female conservative activist Phyllis Schlafly. Grassroots activists, many of them women, were crucial to the conservative Goldwater's victory in the Republican primary over liberal Republican Nelson Rockefeller, particularly in the crucial state of California. However, Goldwater lost the national election to incumbent Democratic president Lyndon Johnson in a landslide. Still, his nomination illustrated the shift from moderation to more hardline stances in many members of the Republican Party. His campaign also showcased the success of conservative grassroots organizations and mobilization.

=== Equal Rights Amendment ===
As feminist organizations, such as the National Organization for Women and ERAmerica, campaigned for the passage of the Equal Rights Amendment, antifeminist organizations run by conservative women mobilized to oppose the amendment. The ERA, stating that "equality of rights under the law shall not be denied or abridged by the United States or by any State on account of sex," passed in the House of Representatives and the Senate with overwhelming majorities in 1971 and 1972, respectively. Following congressional approval, the amendment needed to be ratified by 38 of the 50 state legislatures to be adopted. In the following year 30 states ratified, with most approving the amendment in the first three months. Given the considerable momentum behind the amendment, the ERA appeared certain to be adopted.

Soon after Congress approved the Equal Rights Amendment, Phyllis Schlafly assembled a meeting of conservative women, mostly members of the National Federation of Republican Women, to form STOP ERA ("Stop Taking Our Privileges"). The organization was narrowly focused on opposing ratification of the amendment, claiming the ERA would subject women to the draft, attack the traditional family structure, and promote abortion. STOP ERA established chapters in 26 states and successfully lobbied against ratification in state legislatures that had yet to approve the amendment. The organization mobilized many conservative women, particularly religious women, who were previously uninvolved in politics.

The movement to oppose the Equal Rights Amendment is credited with reviving the Republican Party after the Watergate scandal. Following Nixon's resignation, only 18 percent of voters identified as Republicans. As conservative women mobilized against the ERA, however, the Republican party was able to tap into popular discontent with feminism, abortion rights, and secularism by tying these issues to the movement to pass the amendment. The GOP and the conservative movement made inroads with evangelical Protestants, Roman Catholics, Orthodox Jews, and Mormons through the anti-ratification movement. The campaign against the Equal Rights Amendment, mobilizing women on the basis of their gender, brought new women into the conservative movement based on the social issues of the 1970s, rather than the anticommunist fervor of the early postwar era.

The anti-ERA movement was successful in defeating the amendment, changing the Republican party platform, and shifting public opinion. STOP ERA and its allies ran strong state-level campaigns in battleground states, while pro-ERA groups focused on a national strategy that proved ineffective at winning over state legislators. Conservative women focused on states with traditionalist public sentiments, such as heavily Mormon and Southern states, to prevent the ERA from passing, ensuring the ERA could not reach 38 ratifying states. By 1976, the Republican party abandoned its support of the Equal Rights Amendment, and by 1980 conservative anti-ERA women had succeeded in other goals, securing an anti-abortion plank in the GOP platform and helping nominate Ronald Reagan for president. At the end of the 1970s, less than half of women supported the ERA, and the effort to ratify the amendment was largely abandoned.

=== Reagan era ===
After Goldwater's defeat, grassroots conservatives had to rethink their strategy. Thus, conservative women soon turned to Ronald Reagan. He won over the support of the women of Orange County and successfully unified the party when he was elected Governor of California in the 1966 election. However, there were some women that opposed him due to his more mainstream views. Cyril Stevenson, a prominent leader of the California Republican Assembly, sought to undermine his candidacy. These attempts failed, nevertheless, as Reagan was elected. However, a significantly lower number of women than men voted for Reagan when he was eventually elected President of the United States. Reagan gained the support of more conservative women by attempting to close this "gender gap." He enacted equal rights policies attempting to end discrimination laws. Still, Reagan's election showed that the new Republican majority, although still coined "mainstream," was now built on anti-liberalism and contained more conservative views, and conservative women activists like the women of Orange County played a very important role in that shift.

=== Mama grizzlies ===
The term mama grizzlies originated from Sarah Palin's endorsement of female candidates in the 2010 primaries, whom she gave this title to. Mama grizzly was officially coined in Palin's May 2010 speech for the Susan B. Anthony List Pro-Life group, and it was later used in Palin's own advertisements. This description is used to describe conservative women who wish to play an active role in politics, whether it be through running for office or through campaigning for conservative ideas and topics. These women also refer to themselves as Susan B. Anthony feminists, agreeing with the ideas that Anthony argued for such as political activism but not the feminist ideas more modern than those, such as the pro-choice movement. Because this term originated from Palin's endorsement and was used in Palin's advertisements, it has been linked to her and the Tea Party, which she has affiliated with. These mama grizzlies are self-proclaimed conservative feminists, with Palin herself publicly identifying as a feminist in 2008. In the spread of this new classification for women, where women's advocacy took on a unique form, Palin called for a rise of a new breed of feminism, and this idea quickly came to popularity among right-wing women.

Conservative women played a key role in the Tea Party movement, often adopting populist rhetoric reminiscent of the "housewife populism" of the 1950s and 1960s. These women, most notably Vice Presidential candidate Sarah Palin, attacked Barack Obama as an outsider and claimed to represent the interests of "Joe Six Pack." This brand of populism rose to prominence in the first two years of Obama's presidency, from 2008 to 2010, culminating in the Tea Party. Women were integral to the movement, as they represented 45 to 55 percent of the members of Tea Party organizations and held a majority of leadership positions.

Critics of the mama grizzly viewpoint do not agree that Palin's ideas are feminist, such as her anti-abortion views. Palin's viewpoint has been opposed by socially liberal feminists, with some such as Jessica Valenti, claiming that this angle was used to take advantage of the presence of feminists like Hillary Clinton in the 2008 presidential election cycle. Other complaints draw from the group's denial of systemic sexism and oppression due to gender, with critics believing that mama grizzly ideals could not be labeled as feminist if they were to dismiss these matters.

=== Trump era ===
Republican President Donald Trump received the support of many conservative women, with groups such as Women for Trump backing his presidency. In the 2016 U.S. presidential election, according to exit poll data, 41% of women voted for Trump, as opposed to 54% of women who voted for Hillary Clinton. In the 2020 U.S. presidential election, Trump's support among women increased slightly, as he received 42% of women's vote, a 1% increase from the previous election. In the 2024 U.S. presidential election, the proportion of women who voted for Trump increased again, with Trump obtaining 45% of the women's vote compared to Harris who received 53%. An examination of the demographics of the women who voted for Trump provides greater insight into what motivates their support. For all presidential elections involving Donald Trump, his voting base among women has been majority white. For example, in the 2016 election 52% of white women cast their votes for Trump, a sharp contrast compared to the just 4% of black women who did the same.

Similar patterns occurred in the 2020 and 2024 elections: a mere 9% of black women voted for Trump in 2020, compared to 55% of white women. In 2024, Trump garnered 7% of black women's vote and 53% of white women's. Each year the majority of white women voted for the Republican candidate. In their 2018 article, Setzler and Yanus seek to explain why Trump is so popular with white women, and identify racial resentment (operationalized using the Kinder and Sanders' racial resentment scale) as well as sexism as strong predictors of whether or not women would vote for Trump. "Females with the highest levels of racial resentment were more than four times as likely (i.e., 68% versus 16%) to support Trump than those with the lowest levels of racial animosity. Among women, those with the highest levels of sexism were 54 percentage points (i.e., 76% versus 22%) more likely to support Trump than those who expressed no sexist attitudes."

=== #MeToo Movement ===
The surfacing of the #MeToo movement resulted in a counter-mobilization of conservatives, many of whom turned to antifeminist ideas to combat the movement. Some researchers have investigated the connection between political ideology and the perception of sexual harassment, finding that, in a survey of women, the number of instances of gender discrimination and sexual harassment reportedly experienced by conservative women is significantly lower than that for liberal women. Additionally, some research has found that political participation and the likelihood of voting in general elections are higher for women who have experienced gender discrimination, but that this finding is not a factor associated with this desire for participation among conservative women. There is also a significant gap in support for the #MeToo movement along party lines, as Democratic women report higher levels of support than Republican women.

There are mixed feelings towards the #MeToo movement from conservative women. Candace Owens, an outspoken conservative, tweeted back in 2018 that #MeToo painted women as "stupid, weak & inconsequential." Other conservative women, such as Mona Charen, have shared different sentiments, calling out the "hypocrites" in the Republican Party "who brag about their extramarital affairs" and "brag about mistreating women."

== Notable figures ==
=== Amy Coney Barrett ===
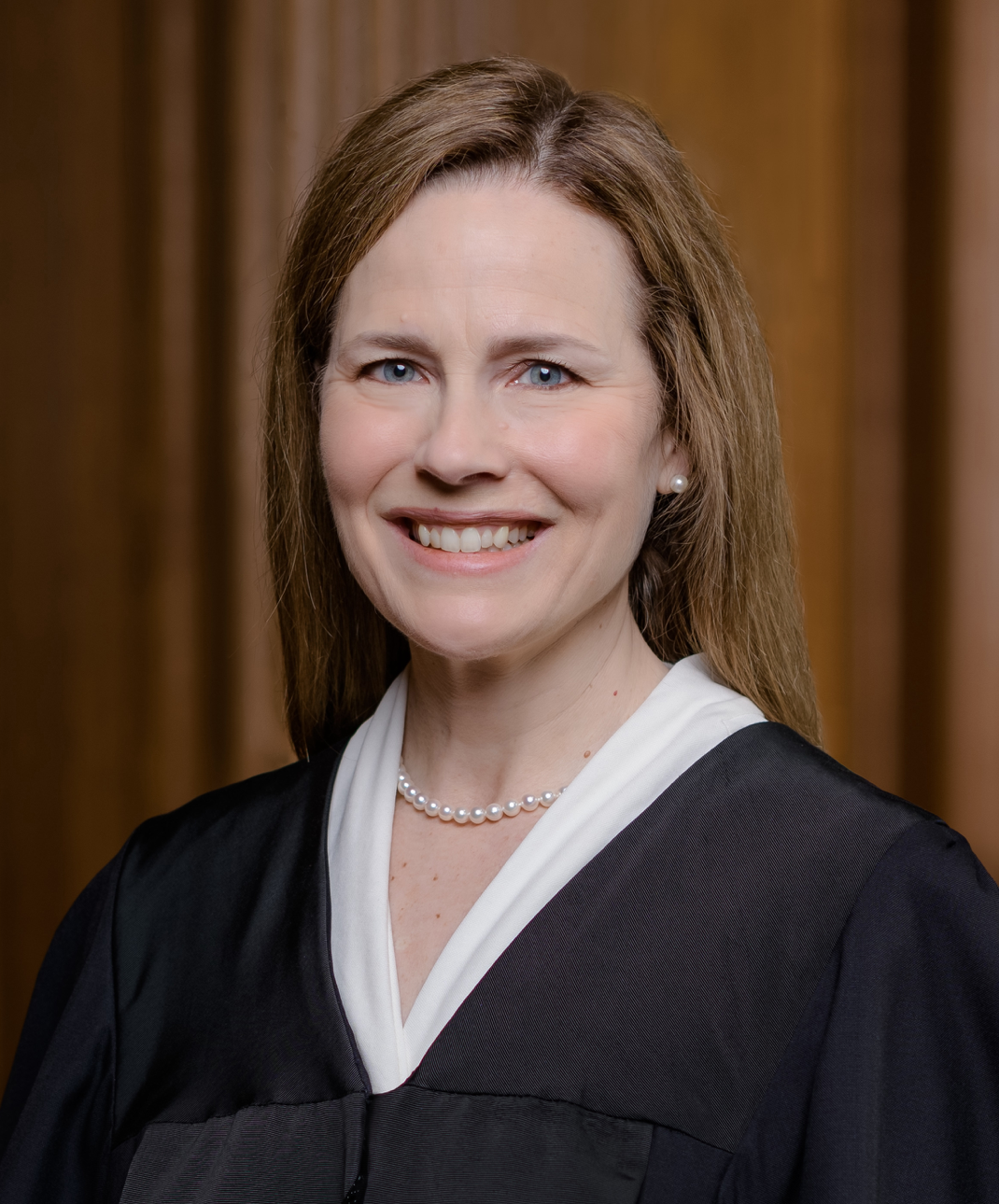
Amy Coney Barrett

Amy Coney Barrett is a Supreme Court justice who was nominated and sworn in under the Trump administration after Justice Ruth Bader Ginsburg's passing. Her nomination and eventual confirmation secured the conservative majority on the Court. Barrett leans more conservative on issues pertaining to abortion, gun, and other civil rights, such as in the case of Kanter v. Barr, where Barrett explained that the right to bear arms should not be taken away from anyone but those convicted of dangerous felonies. Additionally, in June 2022, Barrett voted to overturn Roe v. Wade in the Dobbs v. Jackson Women's Health Organization Supreme Court case, which removed national protections for abortion services.

=== Ann Coulter ===
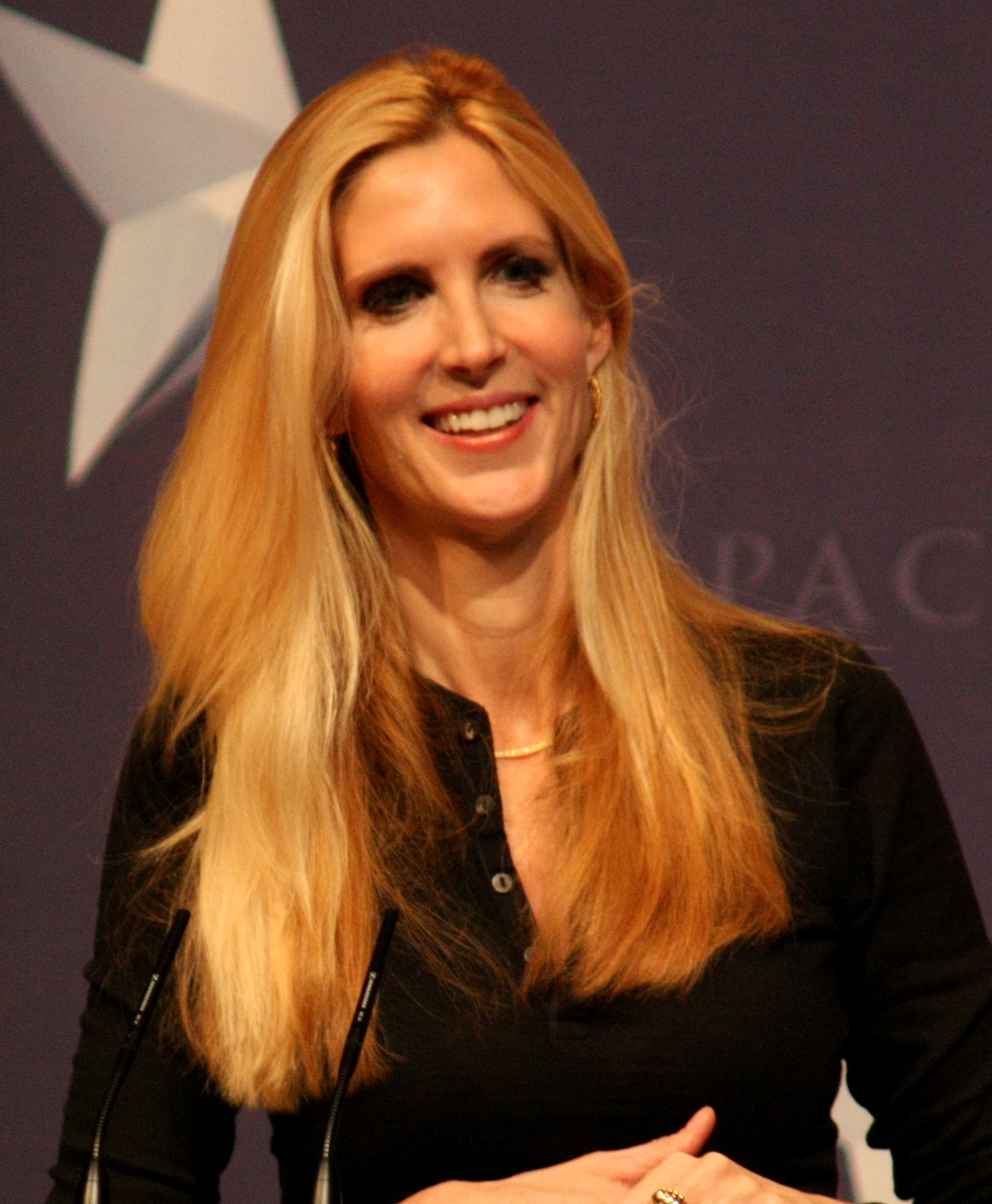
Ann Coulter

As a political commentator, Ann Coulter has authored several books and columns, and frequently appears as a political commentator on conservative television, she is considered one of the most recognizable and influential voices for conservative women today. She has started several conservative political trends, including the continual critique of mainstream liberalism.

=== Carly Fiorina ===
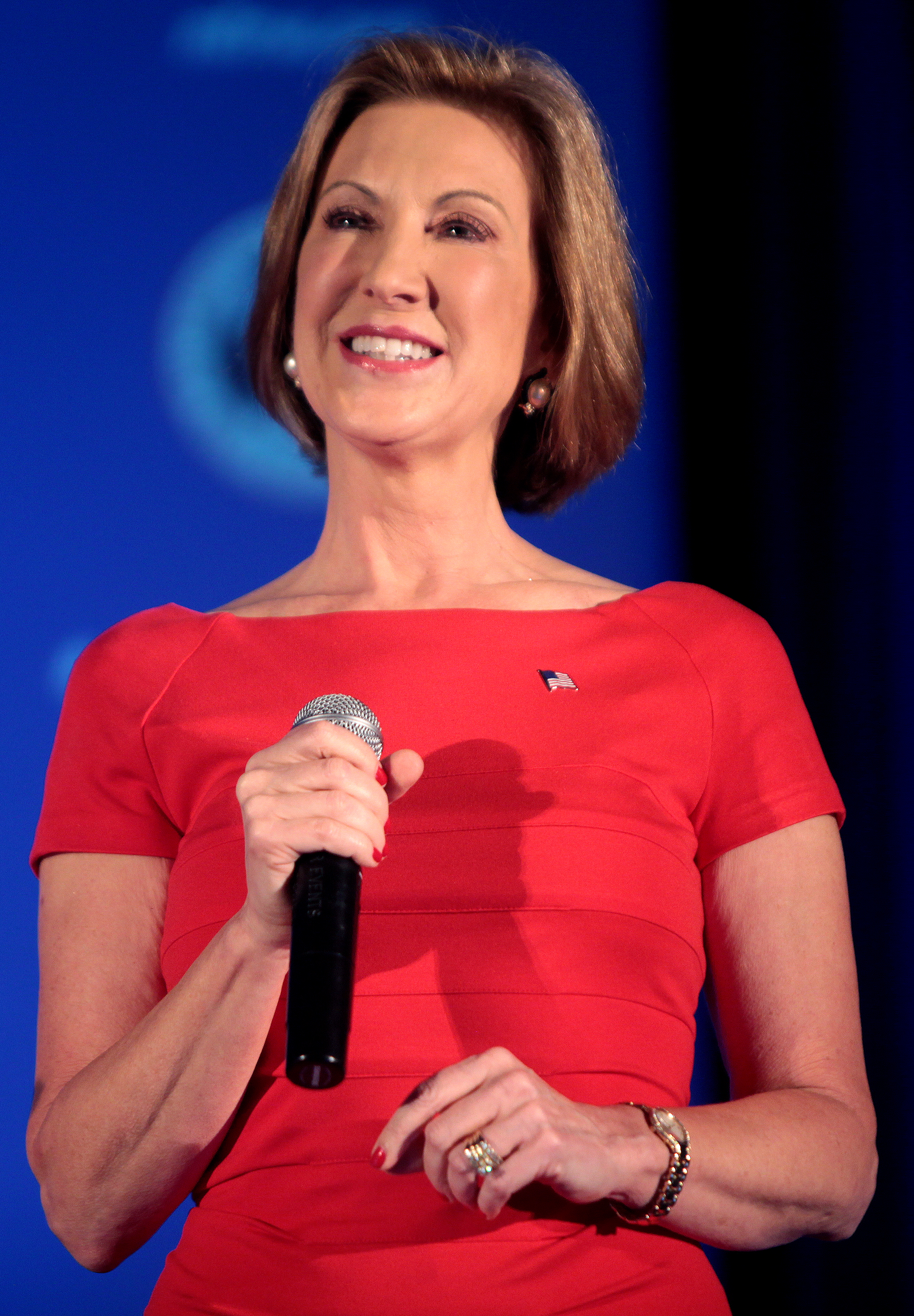
Carly Fiorina

Carly Fiorina began as a successful businesswoman, becoming the CEO of Hewlett-Packard in 1999. However, Fiorina was fired from her position in 2005 due to a number of factors such as economic conditions, operational failures, gender bias, and questionable ethics. Fiorina turned to politics and won the Republican nomination for senator of California in 2010, but lost to incumbent Democrat Barbara Boxer. She quickly gathered acclaim from the Republican base, and was appointed chair of the American Conservative Union Foundation in 2013. In 2015, she announced her candidacy for President of the United States. Although she was the only viable female candidate in the Republican primary, she was reluctant to indulge in gender politics, due to both her conservative and corporate personas. Fiorina dropped out of the race in February 2016 to endorse Ted Cruz, and soon became his running mate.

=== Michele Bachmann ===
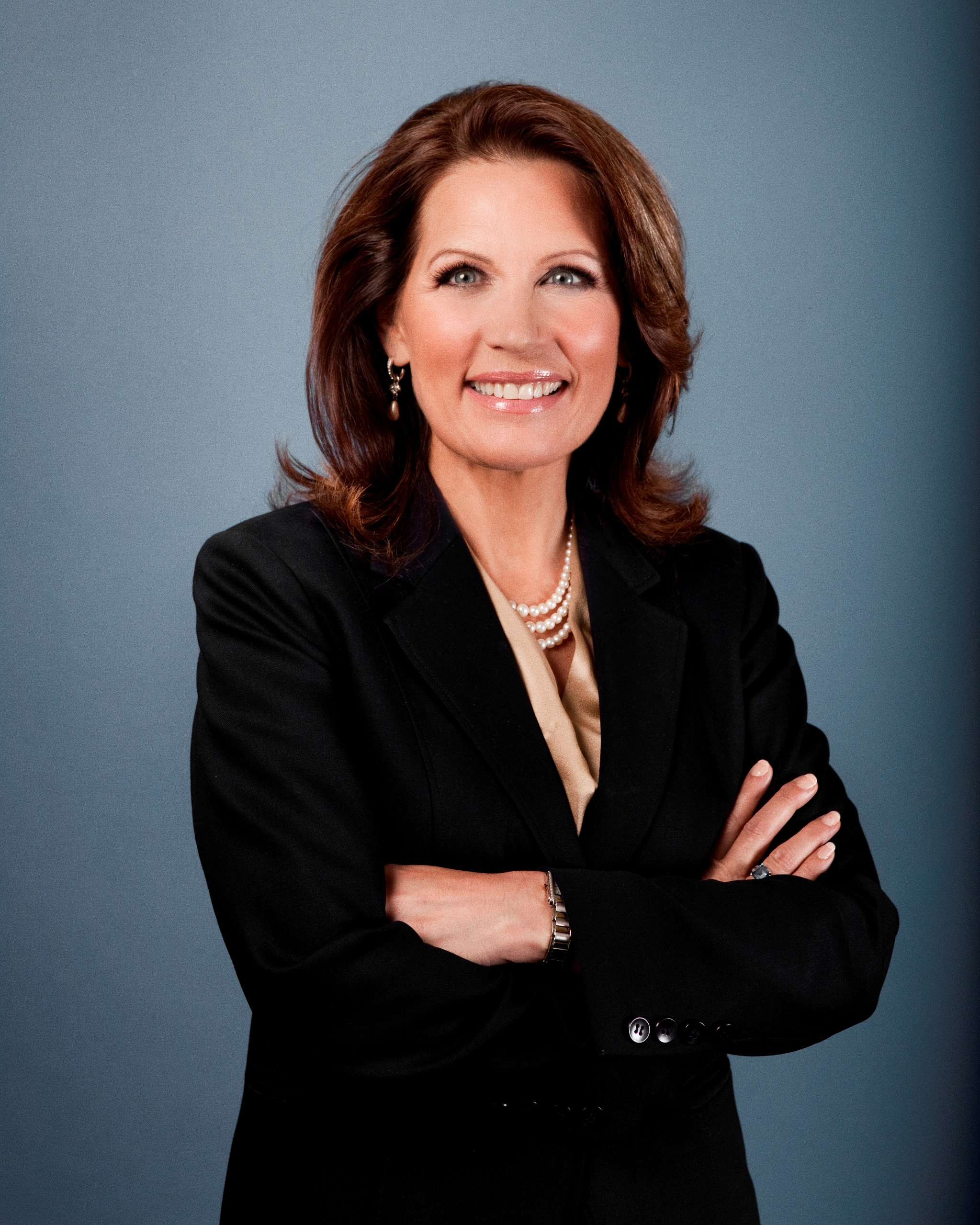
Michele Bachmann

Michele Bachmann unsuccessfully ran for the Republican nomination for president in the 2012 election. Although Bachmann attempted to utilize conservative views that appeal to the Tea Party movement, the media's coverage of her was very different from her male counterparts. The media instead focused on her migraines, her marriage, and her hair and makeup style choices. However, her campaign started strongly, as she performed well in the first presidential debate and soon led in the primary polls. Bachmann was forced to drop out of the race after her poor performance in the Iowa caucuses. Still, many conservative women continue to support her, and this support along with that of Sarah Palin in 2008 has showed that conservatives now seriously consider women for major political roles. Bachmann's run also sparked the debate of women's role in politics and public policy, and whether or not gender roles should be reexamined.

=== Nikki Haley ===
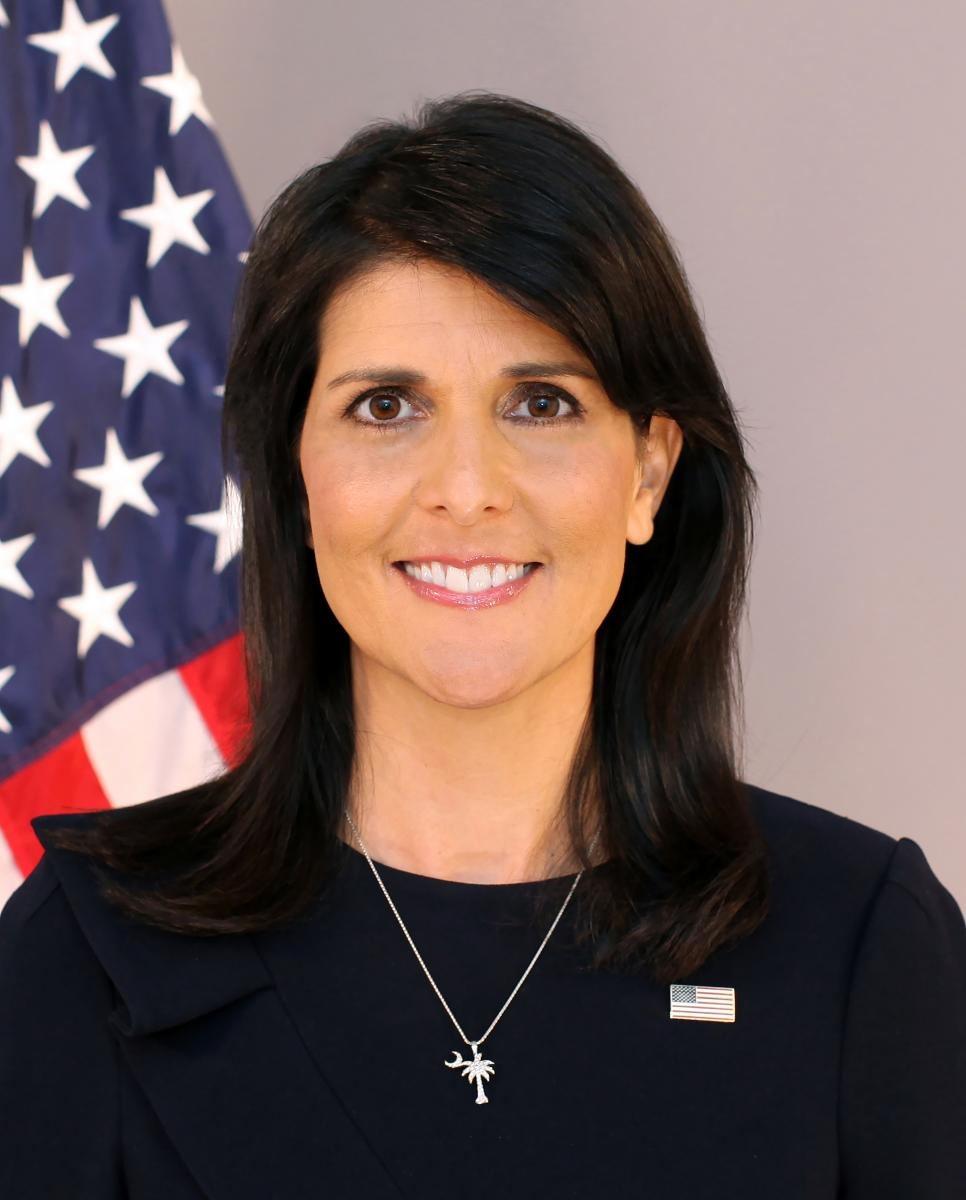
Nikki Haley

Nikki Haley is an Indian-American conservative politician. She served as South Carolina's first female governor from 2011 to 2018, and also served as the U.S. Ambassador to the United Nations under President Donald Trump from 2017 to 2018. She was a candidate in the 2024 Republican presidential primaries facing Trump, among other candidates. She suspended her campaign on March 6, 2024 following losses on Super Tuesday. Haley became the first Republican women to ever win a Presidential primary, winning the D.C. primary, followed by the state of Vermont. In the 2024 primary, she was the last remaining challenger to Donald Trump, where she represented traditional conservative views, with a campaign focused on foreign policy, term limits and mental competency tests, and the economy.

=== Phyllis Schlafly ===
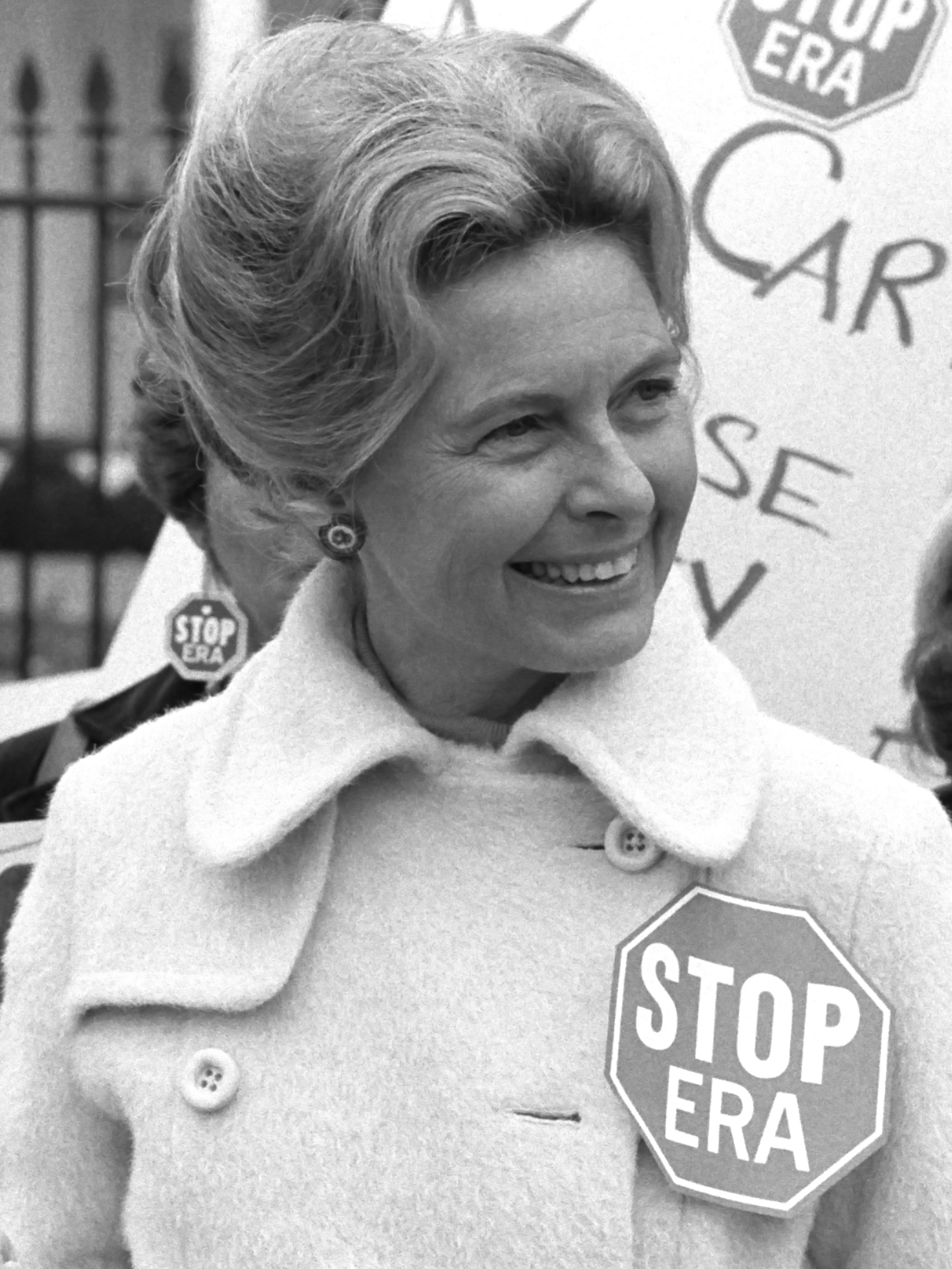
Phyllis Schlafly

As a conservative, Phyllis Schlafly argued that the female gender is actually privileged, and that women have "the most rights and rewards, and the fewest duties." She advocated for women to stay out of politics and the workplace. She argued against feminists and claimed that they actually take away rights from women. She thus led the opposition against the Equal Rights Amendment, and successfully prevented the amendment from being ratified by the required number of states before the ratification deadline set by the Congress. Schlafly argued that the amendment stripped women of what she saw as their special "privileges." She saw it as anti-Christian and argued that it promoted policies such as abortion, sex education, and LGBTQ rights. She also claimed that it would give power to federal courts and take power away from the states.

=== Sarah Palin ===
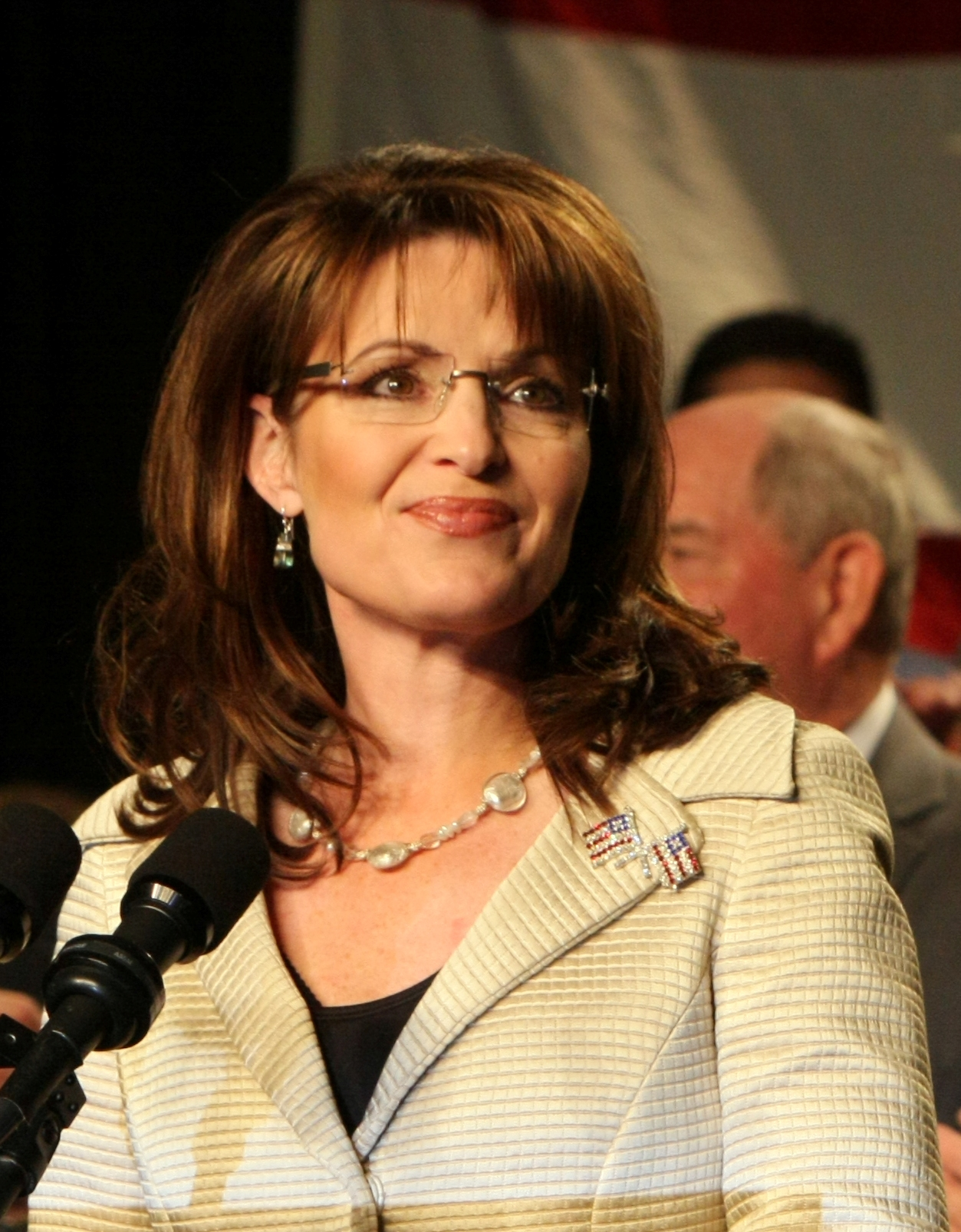
Sarah Palin

In 2010, Sarah Palin, whose nomination to run for Vice President with Republican presidential candidate John McCain was a visible ascent of a conservative woman in 2008, declared a new voice for those women and supported many women for Congress whom she labeled mama grizzlies. Many supported Palin because of her stances against abortion and other issues that defy feminists; her "soccer mom" persona also was very appealing. Palin and McCain eventually lost the general election.

=== Other figures ===
==== Academia ====
- Elizabeth Fox-Genovese, historian
- Alice von Hildebrand, philosopher and Catholic theologian

==== Arts ====
- Kirstie Alley, actress
- Anita Bryant, singer
- Stacey Dash, actress
- Shannen Doherty, actress
- Joanne Dru, actress
- Lillian Gish, actress and member of the anti-World War II America First Committee
- Gloria Gaynor, singer
- Angie Harmon, actress
- Mary Hart, actress
- Patricia Heaton, actress
- Julianne Hough, actress
- Victoria Jackson, actress
- Ruby Keeler, actress
- Cheryl Ladd, actress
- Nicki Minaj, rapper
- Ginger Rogers, actress
- Amber Rose, model and television personality.
- Jane Russell, actress
- Suzanne Somers, actress
- Kristy Swanson, actress
- Shirley Temple, actress and 27th United States Ambassador to Czechoslovakia
- Joy Villa, actress and singer
- Raquel Welch, actress

==== Business and law ====
- Pam Bondi, 87th United States Attorney General and 37th Florida Attorney General
- Barbara Lagoa, U.S. Circuit Judge
- Sue Lowden, businesswoman
- Jeanine Pirro, District Attorney of Westchester County and television host
- Allison Jones Rushing, U.S. Circuit Judge

==== Politics ====
- Diane Black, U.S. Representative from Tennessee
- Marsha Blackburn, U.S. Senator from Tennessee
- Iris Faircloth Blitch, U.S. Representative from Georgia
- Lauren Boebert, U.S. Representative from Colorado
- Jan Brewer, 22nd Governor of Arizona
- Bay Buchanan, 37th Treasurer of the United States
- Kat Cammack, U.S. Representative from Florida
- Elaine Chao, 18th United States Secretary of Transportation and 24th United States Secretary of Labor
- Amanda Chase, State Senator from Virginia
- Kellyanne Conway, Counselor to the President
- Elizabeth Dole, U.S. Senator from North Carolina
- Joni Ernst, U.S. Senator from Iowa
- Mary Fallin, 27th Governor of Oklahoma and previously U.S. Representative
- Deb Fischer, U.S. Senator from Nebraska
- Ezola Foster, 2000 candidate for Vice President of Pat Buchanan
- Virginia Foxx, U.S. Representative from North Carolina
- Marjorie Taylor Greene, U.S. Representative from Georgia
- Paula Hawkins, U.S. Senator from Florida
- Yvette Herrell, U.S. Representative from New Mexico
- Marjorie Holt, U.S. Representative from Maryland
- Kay Hutchison, 22nd U.S. Permanent Representative to NATO and previously U.S. Senator from Texas
- Kay Ivey, 54th Governor of Alabama
- Caitlyn Jenner, media personality, former athlete, and 2021 California gubernatorial recall election Republican candidate
- Alveda King, U.S. State Representative from Georgia and activist
- Jeane Kirkpatrick, 16th U.S. Ambassador to the United Nations
- Kelly Loeffler, 28th Small Business Administration administrator and previously U.S. Senator from Georgia
- Mia Love, U.S. Representative from Utah
- Clare Boothe Luce, U.S. Ambassador to Italy and previously U.S. Representative from Connecticut
- Susana Martinez, 31st Governor of New Mexico
- Lisa McClain, U.S. Representative from Michigan
- Kayleigh McEnany, 33rd White House Press Secretary
- Mary Miller, U.S. Representative from Illinois
- Kristi Noem, 8th United States Secretary of Homeland Security, 33rd Governor of South Dakota, and previously U.S. Representative
- Katrina Pierson, U.S. State Representative from Texas, activist, and political commentator
- Kim Reynolds, 43rd Governor of Iowa
- Condoleezza Rice, 66th United States Secretary of State
- Cathy McMorris Rodgers, U.S. Representative from Washington
- Wendy Rogers, Arizona State Senator
- María Elvira Salazar, U.S. Representative from Florida
- Sarah Huckabee Sanders, 31st White House Press Secretary and 47th Governor of Arkansas
- Elise Stefanik, U.S. Representative from New York
- Claudia Tenney, U.S. Representative from New York
- Ivanka Trump, U.S. Director of the Office of Economic Initiatives and Entrepreneurship
- Melania Trump, twice First Lady of the United States
- Lurleen Wallace, 46th Governor of Alabama
- Usha Vance, lawyer and second lady of the United States.

==== Miscellaneous ====
- Kaitlin Bennett, gun rights activist
- Meghan McCain, television personality and columnist
- Deneen Borelli, author and television personality
- Mona Charen, journalist
- Brett Cooper, political commentator
- Danielle Crittenden, journalist
- S. E. Cupp, political correspondent
- Riley Gaines, NCAA swimmer
- Maggie Gallagher, political commentator
- Mary Katharine Ham, journalist
- Solange Hertz, traditionalist Catholic author
- Margaret Hoover, political commentator
- Laura Ingraham, television host
- Megyn Kelly, journalist and media personality
- Beverly LaHaye, author
- Tomi Lahren, political commentator
- Kathryn Jean Lopez, columnist
- Heather Mac Donald, political commentator
- Michelle Malkin, political commentator
- Peggy Noonan, columnist
- Kate O'Beirne, editor
- Candace Owens, political commentator
- Star Parker, political commentator
- Katie Pavlich, political commentator
- Laura Schlessinger, talk radio host
- Tara Setmayer, political commentator
- Allie Beth Stuckey, political commentator
- Suzanne Venker, author
- Liz Wheeler, political commentator
- Tammy Bruce, radio host, author, political commentator, United States Deputy Ambassador to the United Nations
- Blaire White, YouTuber and political commentator

== Organizations ==
=== Concerned Women for America ===
Concerned Women for America is a religious organization that seeks to promote Christian values. The group was founded in 1979 by Beverly LaHaye, wife of prominent evangelical Christian minister Tim LaHaye, as part of the movement to defeat the Equal Rights Amendment. CWA's ideology is social conservatism, and the group has been labelled as antifeminist. LaHaye founded the group, in part, to contest the claims of feminists to represent all women. Their agenda includes stopping the "decline in moral values of our nation", restricting access to pornography, defunding the United Nations, defining the family as heterosexually led, opposing abortion, and advocating for prayer in schools. Concerned Women for America primarily operates as a grassroots organization, with a membership of approximately 500,000. The group organizes prayer groups for women across the country, and encourages members to contact their representatives to advocate for conservative causes. The group also uses the revenue it generates from membership fees to operate an office in Washington, D.C., which serves as a headquarters for the group's lobbying and research operations.

=== Independent Women's Forum ===
The Independent Women's Forum is an organization based more in fiscal conservatism. The IWF was formed in 1992 by members of Women for Judge Thomas, a group dedicated to supporting Clarence Thomas' confirmation as a Supreme Court Justice, and the Women's Information Network. The IWF was organized explicitly to prevent left-wing women from speaking on behalf of their sex, particularly in the wake of the Clarence Thomas hearings and the Year of the Woman. Its agenda includes opposition to the Violence Against Women Act, supporting the war in Iraq and women's rights there, challenging feminist professors on college campuses, opposing affirmative action, and other fiscal conservative policies; however, IWF is more based in libertarianism than the Republican Party since they strive for economic freedom. IWF in 2003 had approximately 1,600 members. Composed primarily of female political professionals, the group focuses on media appearances, publishing research reports, and helping female members earn Cabinet positions. However, the IWF does not promote female candidates for elected office, claiming these efforts are a form of identity politics.

=== Elevate PAC ===
Elevate PAC is a political action committee created by Elise Stefanik after the 2018 midterm elections to bolster support for female conservative candidates during their primaries. Since then, EPAC has backed 61 conservative women candidates, 27 of whom have won their respective elections.

=== Other organizations ===
- Clare Boothe Luce Policy Institute
- Eagle Forum
- Moms for Liberty
- Network of enlightened Women
- Susan B. Anthony List
- United Daughters of the Confederacy
- Value in Electing Women Political Action Committee (VIEWPAC)
- Winning for Women
- LGBTQ conservatism in the United States

== See also ==
- Equity feminism
- Mama grizzly
