= The Conservative Case for Trump =

2016 book

- Author: Phyllis Schlafly
- Language: English
- Subject: Donald Trump
- Published: 2016
- Publisher: Regnery Books
- Publication place: United States
- Media type: Print (hardcover), Kindle e-book
- ISBN: 978-1-62157-628-0

The Conservative Case for Trump is a 2016 book written by Phyllis Schlafly, with Ed Martin and Brett M. Decker, arguing that American conservatives should vote for Donald Trump in the 2016 presidential election. It was published the day after Schlafly's death, four months after Trump secured the Republican Party nomination in May and two months before he won the general election. The authors describe Trump as someone who promises the most conservative presidency since Ronald Reagan's.

== Authors ==
In the 1970s Phyllis Schlafly founded the Eagle Forum and was a prominent campaigner for family values and against the Equal Rights Amendment. Ed Martin was chairman of the Missouri Republican Party until 2015 and of the Eagle Forum until 2016. When the Eagle Forum endorsed Ted Cruz in the 2016 election, Schlafly and Martin left and founded "Phyllis Schlafly Eagles". Brett M. Decker is Assistant Professor of Business at Defiance College and has written for The Wall Street Journal and The Washington Times.

== Content ==
=== Immigration ===
The Conservative Case for Trump begins with a detailed discussion on Trump's plans for immigration reform including building a wall and "making Mexico pay for it," tripling the number of Immigration and Customs Enforcement workers on the border, passing nationwide e-verify, requiring mandatory deportation of all criminal aliens, defunding sanctuary cities, ending birthright citizenship for "anchor babies," and enhancing penalties for overstaying a visa. Trump claims that the Obama administration "ordered federal officials to lay off illegals." These sanctuary cities, the book claims, lead to an increase in crime because illegal immigrants are not deported. The book also details Trump's view on "anchor babies" (children that automatically receive American citizenship because they are born on U.S. soil). The authors argue that the Fourteenth Amendment does not grant automatic citizenship to those born on U.S. soil because of the words "subject to the jurisdiction thereof." The United States' naturalization process requires its participants to renounce all allegiance to foreign sovereignties. The immigrant parent is subject to the jurisdiction of a foreign country, and therefore the child is also subject to that jurisdiction and not a citizen of the United States. The rest of Chapter 1 details Trump's plan to fight border crime and stop the abuse of the H1-B work visa program.

=== Trade ===
Chapter 2 of The Conservative Case for Trump is titled "Rotten Trade Deals". In it, the authors detail Trump's stance on the United States' involvement with international trade deals like the Trans Pacific Partnership (TPP) and North American Free Trade Agreement (NAFTA). The book states that TPP favors countries with lower median incomes (Mexico, Vietnam, Malaysia) at the expense of higher average household income (United States, Japan, Canada). Schlafly cites a Reuters report that the U.S. trade deficit has "quadrupled from $218 billion to $912 billion." This chapter also details the steps that the U.S. should take with China: declare China a currency manipulator, force China to uphold intellectual property laws, revive American manufacturing, and lower the corporate tax rate to "keep American companies in America."

=== Judiciary ===
A number of Trump's possible Supreme Court appointees are listed in Chapter 4, "Restraining Judicial Activism." These appointees are strict constitutionalists that reject the idea that the Constitution is a living document. Schlafly et al. stress the importance of electing a Republican leader who will nominate originalist justices to the Supreme Court. The book opposes the idea that Supreme Court justices should read new meanings into existing laws.

=== Education ===
The authors assert that the United States' education system is failing. The problem is not money, but the lack of competition between schools. Competition would allow schools to vie for students therefore increasing the school's performance and granting a wider range of choice for parents and students. The book details Trump's proposition that the Department of Education should not dictate school policy; the policy should be dictated by the schools themselves. Furthermore, the authors present the case for a smaller bureaucracy surrounding education in order to allow for innovative education that produces results.

=== Military ===
Chapter 8, "Military Superiority," advocates a stronger military that is focused on defense rather than nation-building. The chapter cites examples of terrorist attacks in America, linking them to immigrants from Middle-Eastern countries. The book proposes that the public agitation around the phrase "Islamic terrorism" and similar phrases hinders the U.S.'s ability to recognize potential threats. It further offers criticism of some GOP government officials for heavily emphasizing nation-building in countries such as Iraq and Syria. Trump is portrayed as a "realist" when it comes to foreign policy. This realism focuses on the national defense rather than policing measures overseas.

=== Federal spending ===
Trump believes that Social Security needs to be readdressed. There are serious problems within the system, but Trump holds that these problems do not discredit the obligation the government has to citizens who were promised use of the system. Instead of cutting benefits, Trump proposes that America needs to bring in more money and reduce the waste and fraud surrounding entitlement programs. Additionally, Trump intends to repeal Obamacare and replace it with a more competition-based system.

=== Personal life ===
Details about Trump's personal life are sprinkled throughout the book. Chapter 3, "Political Correctness Kills," describes Trump's disregard for political correctness, as he claims it hinders the function of government. Schlafly et al. claim that Trump's willingness to speak his mind reinforces the idea of free speech.

Chapter 6, "A Family Man" shows aspects of Trump's personal life that align with conservative values. The book portrays Donald Trump as a devoted family man that, despite his two divorces, remains loyal to his children and extended family and friends. Trump's Christian faith motivates him to push for religious freedom and end abortion.

=== Conclusion ===
The final chapters of the book conclude with a call for a "conservative revolution" that combats the "weakness of [current] Republican politicians." The book asserts that Republicans have not been reflecting true conservative ideas in the government. Republicans in the legislative, executive, and judicial branches who have abandoned traditional conservatism must be replaced. Schlafly, Martin, and Decker claim that this revolution will promote the idea of American Exceptionalism and give a voice to "a majority of American people who have been ignored by a political establishment."
