= Oblinger =

Oblinger is a surname. Notable people with the surname include:

- Albert Oblinger (born 1910), Austrian racing cyclist
- Alexander Oblinger (born 1989), Polish-born German ice hockey player
- Helmut Oblinger (born 1973), Austrian slalom canoeist
- James L. Oblinger (born 1945), American Professor of Food Science and Human Nutrition and Chancellor of North Carolina State University
- Josephine Oblinger (1913–1998), American lawyer and politician
- Violetta Oblinger-Peters (born 1977), German-born Austrian slalom canoeist
