= Gayle Ruzicka =

American politician

- Occupation: Political activist
- Spouse: Don Ruzicka
- Website: Utah Eagle Forum

Gayle Ruzicka (born c. 1943) is a conservative political activist, talk radio host, and leader in the Utah Eagle Forum.

== Biography ==
Ruzicka was born into a politically active family, to a father who was a labor union president active in the Democratic Party. She was raised in Nampa, Idaho. Ruzicka has stated that her family, particularly her mother, were all active in politics at a grass-roots level. She is the mother of 12 children, grandmother of 20, and an active member of the Church of Jesus Christ of Latter-day Saints. Mrs. Ruzicka and her husband, Don Ruzicka, live in Highland, Utah.

According to Ruzicka, growing up she "had been taught that when there was work to be done for God, Family and Country, you rolled up your sleeves and went to work."

=== Political life ===
Ruzicka was involved in politics while raising her children, opposing the Equal Rights Amendment while living in Idaho, and later worked to oppose the 1988 impeachment of Arizona governor Evan Mecham. Ruzicka moved to Utah with her husband and children in 1989. In 1991, she was designated president of the Utah Eagle Forum, the Utah Chapter of the Eagle Forum.

Ruzicka is claimed to be one of the most influential individuals in Utah's political scene and is famous for her phone tree, used to promote her political agenda. In 2004, she was part of the Utah delegation to the Republican National Convention. Additionally, Ruzicka hosts "The Gayle Ruzicka Show" a weekly radio show on KTKK "K-TALK" 630 AM addressing conservative political issues in Utah.

Ruzicka's positions on a variety of conservative and social issues, including homosexuality, have caused controversy.

== Political activities ==
In 2000, Ruzicka was involved with her daughter Kendra's attempt to form a chapter of the Eagle Forum Collegians on the campus of Utah Valley State College (now known as Utah Valley University). Matthew Hilton, the Utah Eagle Forum's attorney, argued that by following the college's non-discrimination policy, the Eagle Forum Collegians would have their First Amendment rights subverted.

During the 2007 Utah legislative session, Ruzicka led the Utah Eagle Forum in the fight to oppose House Bill 358, which appropriated $1 million for the Utah Department of Health to promote the availability of a cervical cancer vaccine.

In 2012, Gayle Ruzicka acted as a prominent proponent of HB 363, a Utah State house bill that would prohibit public schools from teaching students about sex. This bill would give schools the option to either teach abstinence only or not provide sex education at all. This bill was met with opposition by some Utahns. Opponents of the bill organized an online petition which received more than 40,000 signatures. The bill was vetoed by Gov. Herbert.
