= NASCAR dad =

Demographic term

NASCAR dad is a phrase that broadly refers to a demographic group of often white, usually middle-aged, working-class or lower-middle-class men in North America. The group received the nickname because they are men who are believed to typically enjoy watching NASCAR racing or comparable high-impact sports or entertainment.

The term was often used during the 2004 United States presidential election, particularly in describing the efforts of Democrats to regain the votes of white southern males. As of 2004, the group consists of an estimated 45 million people in the United States.

== See also ==
- Mama grizzly
- Soccer mom
- South Park Republican
- Stage mother
- Essex man/Mondeo Man
