= Phyllis Schlafly =

American activist (1924–2016)

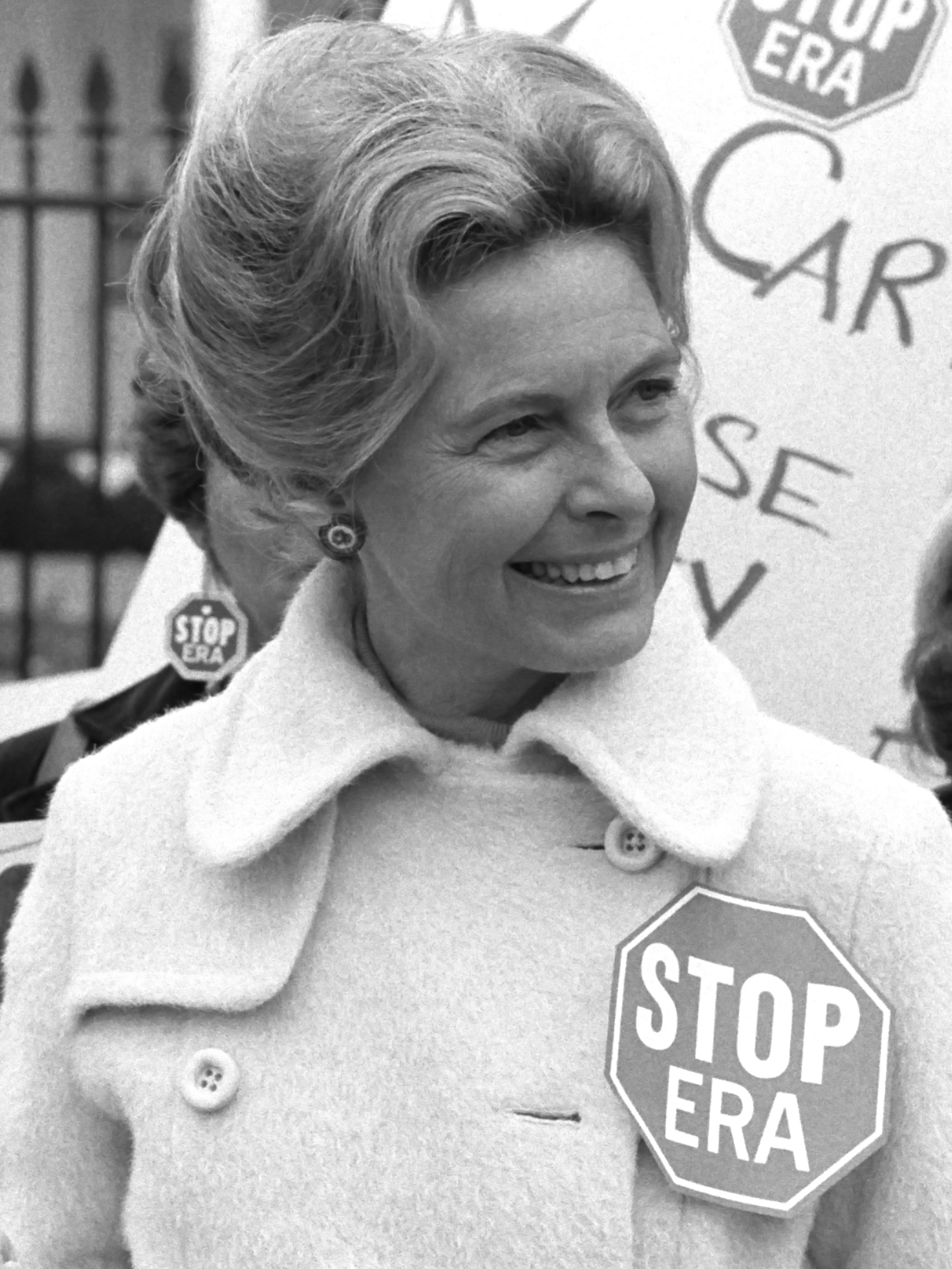
- Schlafly in 1977
- Born: Phyllis McAlpin Stewart; August 15, 1924; St. Louis, Missouri, U.S.
- Died: September 5, 2016 (aged 92); Ladue, Missouri, U.S.
- Education: Washington University in St. Louis (BA, JD); Radcliffe College (MA)
- Political party: Republican
- Spouse: Fred Schlafly (m. 1949; died 1993)
- Children: 6, including Andrew Schlafly
- Relatives: Thomas Schlafly (nephew); Suzanne Venker (niece)

Phyllis Stewart Schlafly (/ˈʃlæfli/; born Phyllis McAlpin Stewart; August 15, 1924 – September 5, 2016) was an American attorney and activist who was nationally prominent in conservatism. She opposed feminism, gay rights, and abortion, and campaigned against the ratification of the Equal Rights Amendment to the U.S. Constitution.

More than three million copies of her self-published book A Choice Not an Echo (1964), a polemic in support of Republican candidate Barry Goldwater and condemning more liberal East Coast Republicans personified by Nelson Rockefeller, were sold or distributed for free. Schlafly co-authored books on national defense, and was critical of arms control agreements with the Soviet Union.

In 1972, Schlafly founded the Eagle Forum, a conservative political interest group, and remained its chair and CEO until her death in 2016, while staying active in conservative causes.

== Early life ==
Born Phyllis McAlpin Stewart, Schlafly was raised in St. Louis. Schlafly's great-grandfather Stewart, a Presbyterian, emigrated from Scotland to New York in 1851 and moved westward through Canada before settling in Michigan. Her grandfather, Andrew F. Stewart, was a master mechanic with the Chesapeake & Ohio Railway. Schlafly's father, John Bruce Stewart, was a machinist and salesman of industrial equipment, principally for Westinghouse. He was granted a patent in 1944 for a rotary engine.

During the Great Depression, Schlafly's father faced long-term unemployment, beginning in 1932. Before her marriage, her mother, Odile Stewart (née Dodge), worked as a teacher at a private girls' school in St. Louis. During the Depression, she went back to work as a librarian and teacher to support her family. Mrs. Stewart was able to keep the family afloat and maintain Phyllis in a Catholic girls' school. Phyllis's sole sibling was her younger sister, Odile.

=== Education ===
Schlafly attended Maryville College, but after one year, transferred to Washington University in St. Louis. In 1944, she graduated with a Bachelor of Arts and was a member of Phi Beta Kappa. In 1945, after attending Harvard, she received a Master of Arts degree in government from Radcliffe.

In Strike From Space (1965), Schlafly wrote that during World War II, she worked as "a ballistics gunner and technician at the largest ammunition plant in the world". She earned a Juris Doctor degree from the Washington University School of Law in 1978.

== Activism and political efforts ==
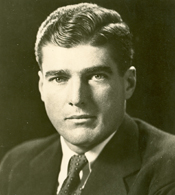
Among Schlafly's early experiences in politics was working in the successful 1946 campaign of Congressman Claude I. Bakewell.

In 1946, Schlafly became a researcher for the American Enterprise Institute and worked in the successful United States House of Representatives campaign of Republican Claude I. Bakewell.

In 1952, Schlafly ran for Congress as a Republican in the majority Democratic 24th congressional district of Illinois. She won the Republican primary election over John T. R. Godlewski by 18,793 (61.14%) to 11,943 (38.86%). However, she lost the general election to incumbent Democrat Charles Melvin Price, winning 63,778 votes (35.20%) to Price's 117,408 votes (64.80%). Schlafly's campaign was low-budget and promoted heavily through the local print media, and the major munitions manufacturers John M. Olin and Spencer Truman Olin, and the Texas oil billionaire H. L. Hunt. She was the keynote speaker at the June 1952 Illinois state convention of the Republican Party. In her speech, she accused the Truman administration of "demoralizing our children by bad examples, drafting our men, and confiscating our family income." In early July 1952, she attended her first Republican National Convention. She would attend each subsequent Republican National Convention until her death. As part of the Illinois delegation of the 1952 convention, Schlafly endorsed U.S. Senator Robert A. Taft to be the party's nominee in the presidential election.

She played a major role with her husband in 1957 in writing the "American Bar Association's Report on Communist Tactics, Strategy, and Objectives." Donald T. Critchlow says it "became not only one of the most widely read documents ever produced by the ABA, it was probably the single most widely read publication of the grassroots anticommunist movement."

Schlafly was elected to serve as an alternate delegate to the 1960 Republican National Convention from Illinois' 24th congressional district. At the convention, Schlafly helped lead a revolt of "moral conservatives" who opposed Richard Nixon's stance "against segregation and discrimination." Schlafly was the Republican nominee for Illinois's 24th congressional district again in 1960. She again lost the general election to Price, this time by 144,560 votes (72.22%) to 55,620 (27.79%).

She came to national attention when millions of copies of her self-published book A Choice Not an Echo were distributed in support of Barry Goldwater's 1964 presidential campaign, especially in California's hotly fought winner-take-all-delegates GOP primary. In it, Schlafly denounced the Rockefeller Republicans in the Northeast, accusing them of corruption and globalism. Critics called the book a conspiracy theory about "secret kingmakers" controlling the Republican Party. Schlafly had previously been a member of the John Birch Society; founder Robert Welch Jr. referred to her as a "very loyal" member. She later quit and denied she had been a member because she feared her association with the organization would damage her book's reputation. By mutual agreement her books were not mentioned in the society's magazine, American Opinion, and the distribution of her books by the society was handled so as to mask their involvement. The society was able to dispense 300,000 copies of A Choice Not an Echo in California prior to the June 2, 1964, GOP primary. Gardiner Johnson, Republican National Committee for California, stated that the distribution of her book in California was a major factor in Goldwater's winning the nomination.

In 1967, Schlafly lost a bid for the presidency of the National Federation of Republican Women against the more moderate candidate Gladys O'Donnell of California. Outgoing NFRW president and future United States Treasurer Dorothy Elston of Delaware worked against Schlafly in the campaign.

In 1970, she ran unsuccessfully for Illinois's 23rd congressional district, losing to Democratic incumbent George E. Shipley by 91,158 votes (53.97%) to 77,762 (46.04%). She never sought public office again.

American feminists made their greatest bid for national attention at the 1977 National Women's Conference in Houston; however, historian Marjorie J. Spruill argues that the anti-feminists led by Schlafly organized a highly successful counter-conference, the Pro-Life, Pro-Family Rally, to protest the National Women's Conference and make it clear that feminists did not speak for them. At their rally at the Astro Arena they had an overflow of over 15,000 people, and announced the beginning of a pro-family movement to oppose politicians who had been supporting feminism and liberalism, and to promote "family values" in American politics, and so moved the Republican Party to the right and defeated the ratification of the ERA.

=== Opposition to Equal Rights Amendment ===
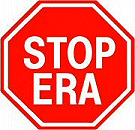
Symbol used on signs and buttons of ERA opponents

Schlafly became an outspoken opponent of the Equal Rights Amendment (ERA) during the 1970s as the organizer of the "STOP ERA" campaign. STOP was a backronym for "Stop Taking Our Privileges". She argued that the ERA would take away gender-specific privileges enjoyed by women, including "dependent wife" benefits under Social Security, separate restrooms for males and females, and exemption from Selective Service (the military draft). She was opposed by groups such as the National Organization for Women (NOW) and the ERAmerica coalition. The Homemakers' Equal Rights Association was formed to counter Schlafly's campaign.

In 1972, when Schlafly began her campaign against the Equal Rights Amendment, the ERA had already been ratified by 28 of the required 38 states. Seven more states ratified the amendment after Schlafly began organizing opposition, but another five states rescinded their ratifications. The last state to ratify the ERA was Indiana, where State Senator Wayne Townsend cast the tie-breaking vote in January 1977. (Nevada, Illinois and Virginia ratified the ERA between 2017 and 2020, many years after the deadline to do so.)

The Equal Rights Amendment was narrowly defeated, having only achieved ratification in a total 35 states. Political scientist Jane J. Mansbridge concluded in her history of the ERA:

Many people who followed the struggle over the ERA believed—rightly in my view—that the Amendment would have been ratified by 1975 or 1976 had it not been for Phyllis Schlafly's early and effective effort to organize potential opponents.

Joan Williams argues, "ERA was defeated when Schlafly turned it into a war among women over gender roles." Historian Judith Glazer-Raymo argues:

As moderates, we thought we represented the forces of reason and goodwill but failed to take seriously the power of the family values argument and the single-mindedness of Schlafly and her followers. The ERA's defeat seriously damaged the women's movement, destroying its momentum and its potential to foment social change ... Eventually, this resulted in feminist dissatisfaction with the Republican Party, giving the Democrats a new source of strength that when combined with overwhelming minority support, helped elect Bill Clinton to the presidency in 1992 and again in 1996.

Critics of Schlafly pointed out that she was not a typical housewife, as she was heavily involved in political causes.

=== Broadcast media ===
In broadcast media, Schlafly provided commentaries on Chicago news radio station WBBM from 1973–75, CBS Morning News from 1974-75, and CNN from 1980-83. In 1983, she began creating syndicated daily 3-minute commentaries for radio. In 1989, she began hosting a weekly radio talk show, Eagle Forum Live.

== Viewpoints ==
=== Social viewpoints ===
==== Women's issues ====
In November 1977, she was an opposition speaker at the 1977 National Women's Conference with Lottie Beth Hobbs, Dr. Mildred Jefferson, Nellie Gray, and Bob Dornan.

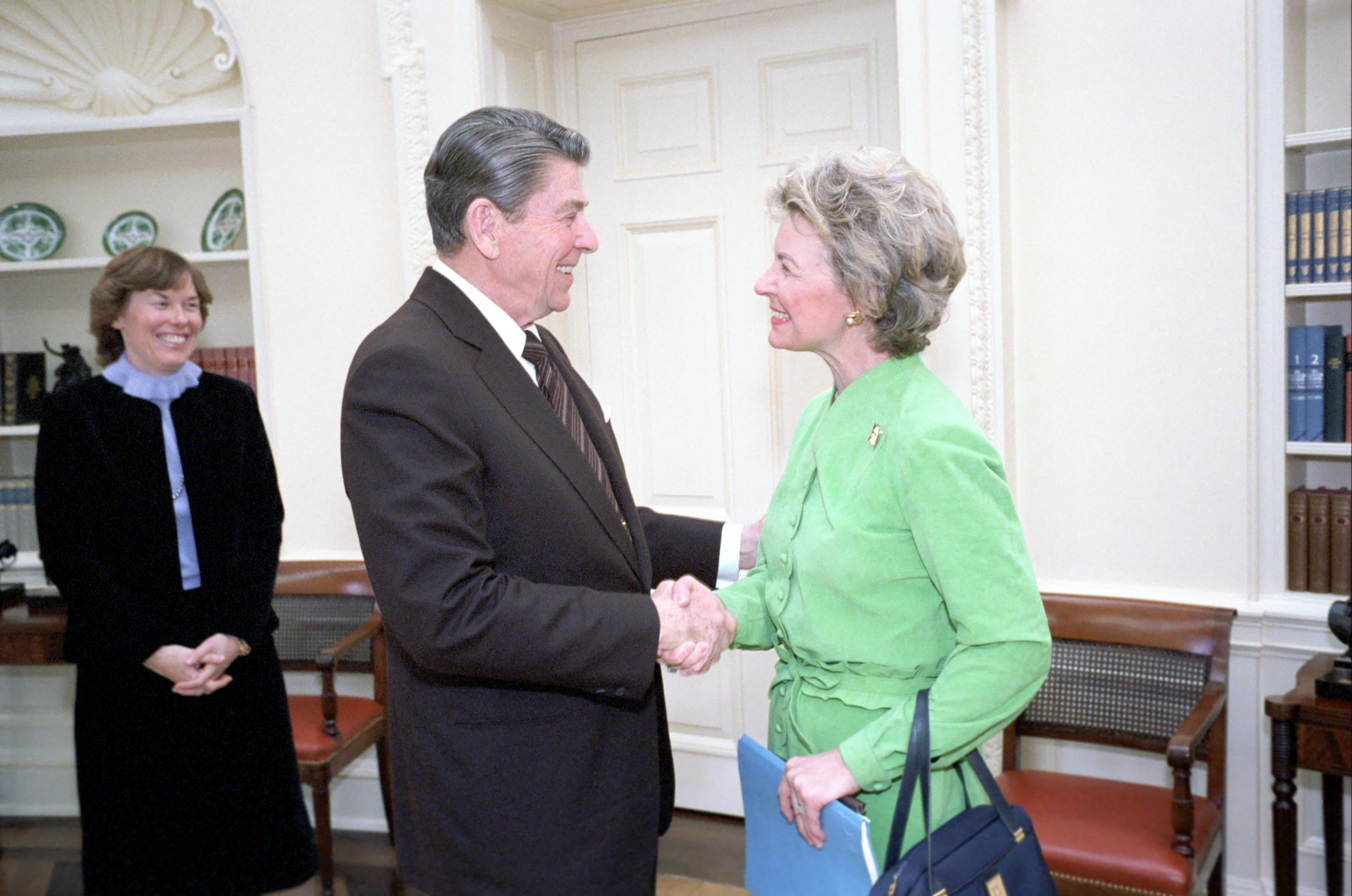
Schlafly with President Ronald Reagan in 1983

Schlafly told Time magazine in 1978, "I have cancelled speeches whenever my husband thought that I had been away from home too much."

In an interview on March 30, 2006, she attributed improvement in women's lives during the last decades of the 20th century to labor-saving devices such as the indoor clothes dryer and disposable diapers.

She called Roe v. Wade "the worst decision in the history of the U.S. Supreme Court" and said that it "is responsible for the killing of millions of unborn babies".

==== Equal Rights Amendment ====
External videos
- Phyllis Schlafly and Geline B. Williams discussing their opposition to the ERA on "Woman; 107; Equal Rights Amendment, Part 2," 1973-12-06, WNED, American Archive of Public Broadcasting (WGBH and the Library of Congress), Boston, MA and Washington, DC

Schlafly focused political opposition to the ERA in defense of traditional gender roles, such as only men fighting in war. She argued that the Equal Rights Amendment would eliminate the men-only draft and ensure that women would be equally subject to conscription and be required to serve in combat, and that defense of traditional gender roles proved a useful tactic. In Illinois, the anti-ERA activists used traditional symbols of the American housewife, and took homemade foods (bread, jams, apple pies, etc.) to the state legislators, with the slogans, "Preserve us from a congressional jam; Vote against the ERA sham" and "I am for Mom and apple pie."

The historian Lisa Levenstein said that, in the late 1970s, the feminist movement briefly attempted a program to help older divorced and widowed women. Many widows were ineligible for Social Security benefits, few divorcees received alimony, and, after a career as a housewife, few had any work skills with which to enter the labor force. The program, however, encountered sharp criticism from young activists who gave priority to poor minority women rather than to middle-class women. By 1980, NOW downplayed the program, as they focused almost exclusively on ratification of the ERA. Schlafly moved into the political vacuum, and denounced the feminists for abandoning older, middle-class widows and divorcees in need, and warned that the ERA would unbalance the laws in favor of men, stripping legal protections that older women urgently needed.

Schlafly said that the ERA was designed for the benefit of young career women, and warned that if men and women had to be treated equally, that social condition would threaten the security of middle-aged housewives without job skills. She also contended that the ERA would repeal legal protections, such as alimony, and eliminate the judicial tendency for divorced mothers to receive custody of their children. Schlafly's argument that protective laws would be lost resonated with working-class women.

In 2007, while working to defeat a new version of the Equal Rights Amendment, Schlafly warned it would force courts to approve same-sex marriages and deny Social Security benefits for housewives and widows.

==== Gender pay gap ====
Schlafly objected to the concept of the gender pay gap, saying of it that "a deceitful propaganda campaign has been orchestrated by the feminist movement." She stated that it is "part of the feminists' denigration of the role of motherhood [...] designed to eliminate [...] motherhood by changing us into a society in which women are harnessed into the labor force both full-time and for a lifetime". In fact, she believed that even if men do earn more than women, it is beneficial to society as a whole, because, "we want a society in which the average man earns more than the average woman so that his earnings can fulfill his provider role in providing a home and support for his wife who is nurturing and mothering their children." She stated: "We certainly don't want a society in which the average wage paid to all women equals [that of] men, because that society would have eliminated the role of motherhood."

==== Motherhood ====
Schlafly believed that the primary role of a woman should be that of wife, mother, and homemaker rather than career woman. She also believed that motherhood is crucial to the well-being of society, stating: "[Motherhood] is the most socially useful role of all" and "the dependent wife and mother who cares for her own children...performs the most socially necessary role in our society."

==== Differences between men and women ====
Schlafly held the position that men and women are fundamentally different and opposed what she termed the "feminist [propagandist]" assertion that "we must redesign society to become gender neutral and that men must shed their macho image and remake themselves to become househusbands." Instead, she believed that it was not possible to eradicate the differences between men and women. She argued that feminists "will have to take up their complaint with God," because "no other power can alter the fundamental and necessary differences between men and women."

==== Family ====
Schlafly contended that the family is the place of greatest growth and satisfaction for women. She rejected what she claimed is the feminist view that the family is an anachronism that binds women down. She believed that the institution of the family as "the basic unit of society [...] is the greatest single achievement in the entire history of women's rights." She stated that "the future of our nation depends on children who grow up to be good citizens, and the best way of achieving that goal is to have emotionally stable, intact families."

==== Marriage ====
In March 2007, Schlafly spoke against the concept of marital rape in a speech at Bates College in Lewiston, Maine, "By getting married, the woman has consented to sex, and I don't think you can call it rape."

Schlafly argued that in marriage, men and women's roles are different and should remain so. She defended her stance as one necessary to order instead of a threat to equality; she said, "If marriage is to be a successful institution, it must...have an ultimate decision maker, and that is the husband."

==== Same-sex marriage ====
Schlafly opposed same-sex marriage and civil unions: "[a]ttacks on the definition of marriage as the union of one man and one woman come from the gay lobby seeking social recognition of their lifestyle." Linking the Equal Rights Amendment to LGBT rights and same-sex marriage played a role in Schlafly's opposition to the ERA.

==== United Nations and international relations ====
Over the years, Schlafly disdained the United Nations. On the 50th anniversary of the UN in 1995, she referred to it as "a cause for mourning, not celebration. It is a monument to foolish hopes, embarrassing compromises, betrayal of our servicemen, and a steady stream of insults to our nation. It is a Trojan Horse that carries the enemy into our midst and lures Americans to ride under alien insignia to fight and die in faraway lands." She opposed President Bill Clinton's decision in 1996 to send 20,000 American troops to Bosnia during the Yugoslav Wars. Schlafly observed that Balkan nations have fought one another for 500 years and argued that the U.S. military should not be "policemen" of world trouble spots.

Prior to the 1994 Congressional elections, Schlafly condemned globalization through the World Trade Organization as a "direct attack on American sovereignty, independence, jobs, and economy ... any country that must change its laws to obey rulings of a world organization has sacrificed its sovereignty."

In late 2006, Schlafly collaborated with Jerome Corsi and Howard Phillips to create a website in opposition to the idea of a "North American Union", under which the United States, Mexico, and Canada would share a currency and be integrated in a structure similar to the European Union.

During the Cold War, Schlafly opposed arms control agreements with the Soviet Union. In 1961, she wrote that "[arms control] will not stop Red aggression any more than disarming our local police will stop murder, theft, and rape."

==== Judicial system ====
Schlafly was an outspoken critic of what she termed "activist judges", particularly on the Supreme Court. In 2005, Schlafly made headlines at a conference for the Judeo-Christian Council for Constitutional Restoration by suggesting that "Congress ought to talk about impeachment" of Justice Anthony Kennedy, citing as specific grounds Justice Kennedy's deciding vote to abolish the death penalty for minors.

In April 2010, shortly after John Paul Stevens announced his retirement as an associate justice of the U.S. Supreme Court, Schlafly called for the appointment of a military veteran to the Court. Stevens had been a veteran and, with his retirement, the court was "at risk of being left without a single military veteran."

==== Immigration proposals ====
Schlafly believed the Republican Party should reject immigration reform proposals; she told Focus Today that it is a "great myth" that the GOP needs to reach out to Latinos in the United States. "The people the Republicans should reach out to are the white votes, the white voters who didn't vote in the last election. The propagandists are leading us down the wrong path ... [T]here's not any evidence at all that these Hispanics coming in from Mexico will vote Republican."

==== Presidential elections ====
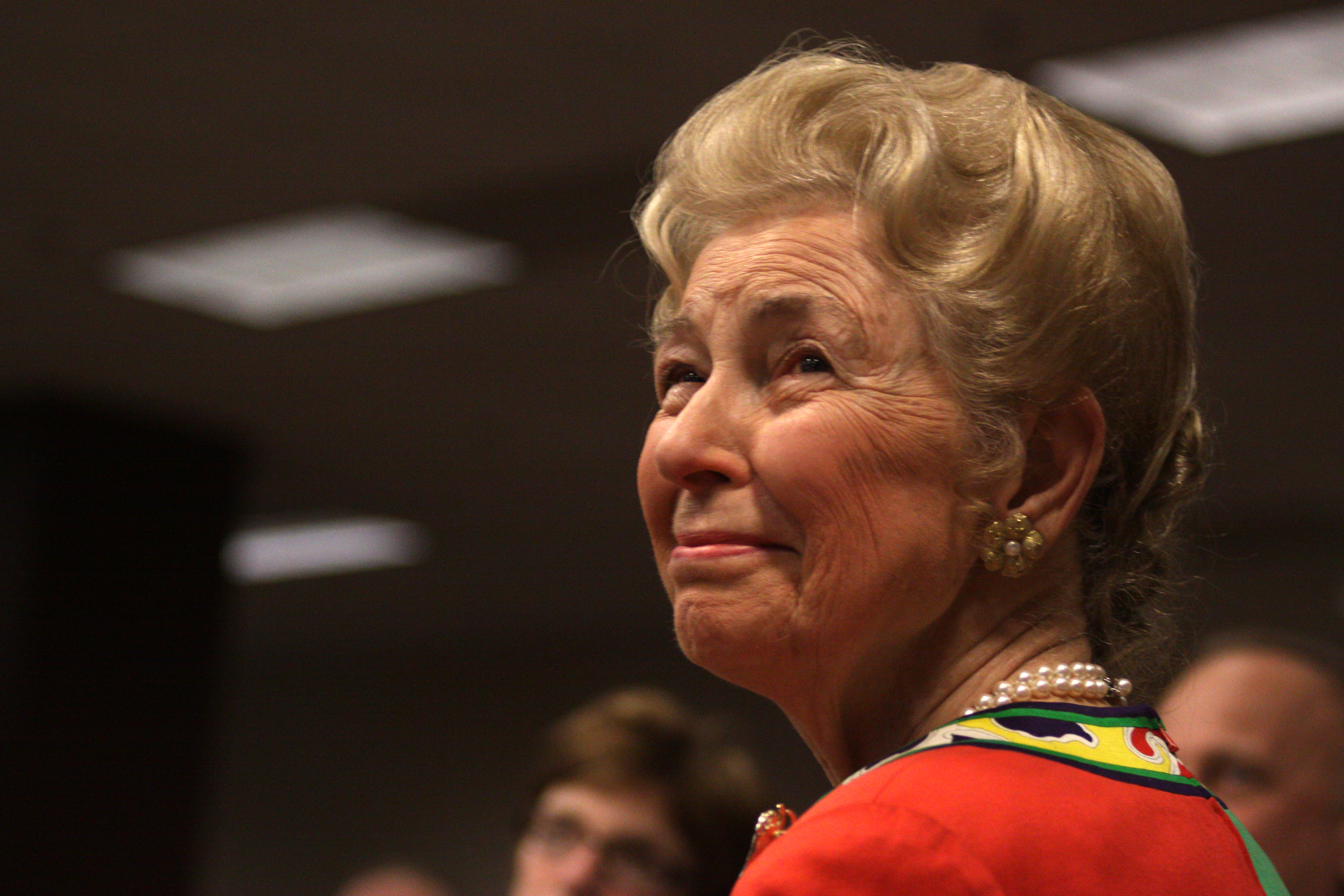
Schlafly at a gathering of conservatives in Des Moines, Iowa, in March 2011

Schlafly did not endorse a candidate for the 2008 Republican presidential nomination, but she spoke out against Mike Huckabee, who, she says, as governor left the Republican Party in Arkansas "in shambles". At the Eagle Forum, she hosted U.S. Representative Tom Tancredo of Colorado, known for his opposition to illegal immigration. Before his election, she criticized Barack Obama as "an elitist who worked with words".

During the election, she endorsed John McCain in an interview by saying: "Well, I'm a Republican, I'm supporting McCain". When asked about criticism of John McCain from Rush Limbaugh, she said: "Well, there are problems, we are trying to teach him".

Schlafly endorsed Michele Bachmann in December 2011 for the Iowa caucus of the 2012 Republican presidential primaries, citing Bachmann's work against "ObamaCare" and deficit spending and Bachmann's support of "traditional values."

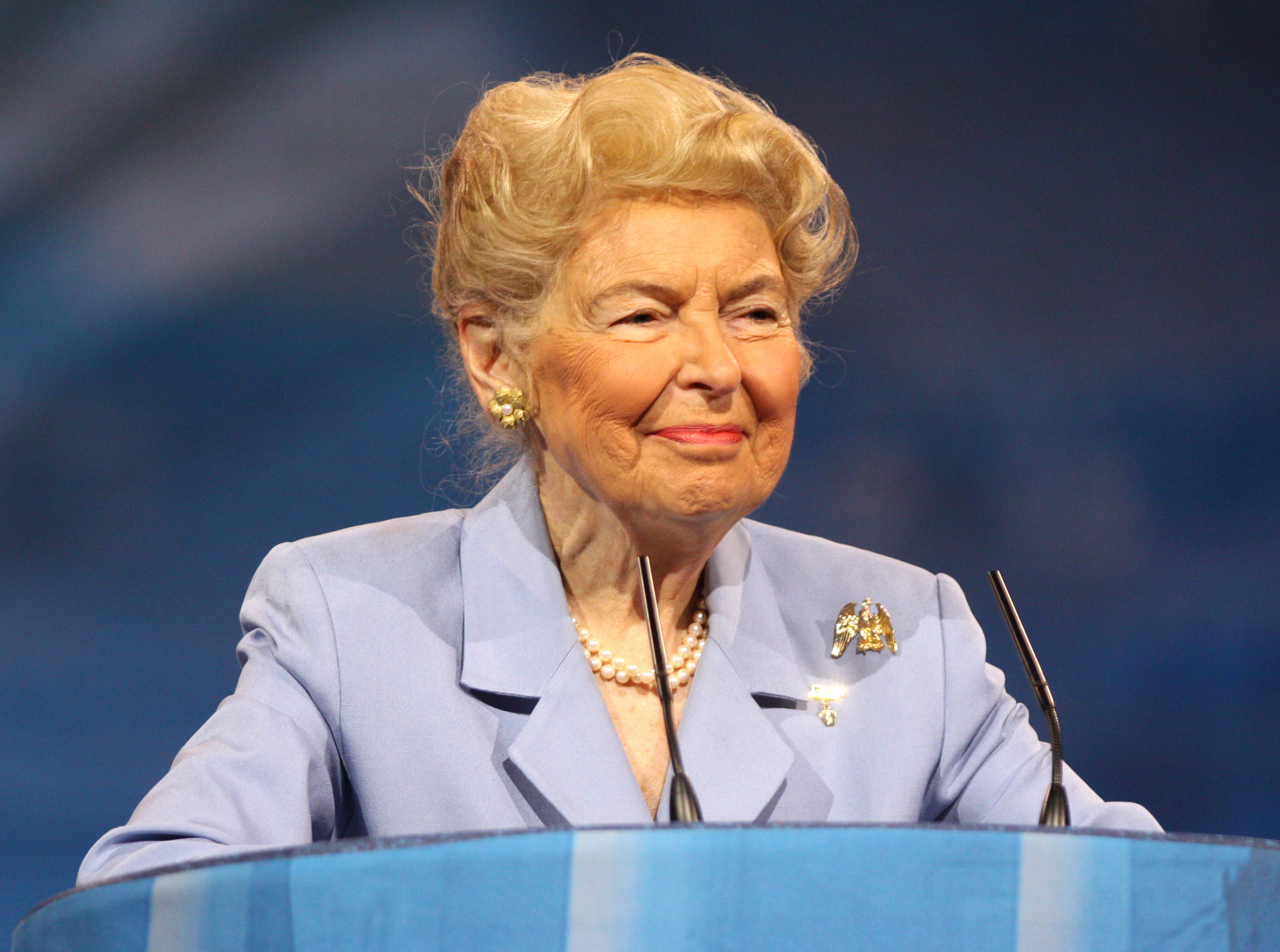
Schlafly speaking at CPAC 2013

On February 3, 2012, Schlafly announced that she would be voting for Rick Santorum in that year's Missouri Republican primary. In 2016, she endorsed Donald Trump's candidacy for president. The endorsement soon led to a breach in the Eagle Forum board. Schlafly broke with six dissident members, including her daughter, Anne Cori, and Cathie Adams, the former state chairman of the Texas Republican Party. Adams instead supported U.S. Senator Ted Cruz of Texas, Trump's principal challenger whom Adams considered a more conservative choice.

Schlafly's last book, The Conservative Case for Trump, was published September 6, 2016, one day after her death.

== Honorary degree and protests ==
On May 1, 2008, the trustees of Washington University in St. Louis, announced that Schlafly would receive an honorary degree at the graduation ceremony for the Class of 2008. This news was met with objection from some students and faculty, who complained she was anti-feminist and criticized her work in defeating the Equal Rights Amendment. In a letter, fourteen law professors complained Schlafly's career demonstrated "anti-intellectualism in pursuit of a political agenda."

While the trustees' honorary-degree committee unanimously approved who would be honored, five student-members of the committee complained, in writing, that they were required to vote for the five people to be honored, as a slate, rather than individually, and thought that the selection of Schlafly was a mistake, despite her prominence as a famous graduate of Washington University. In the days before the graduation ceremony, Washington University Chancellor Mark S. Wrighton explained the trustees' decision to award Schlafly an honorary degree with the following statement of disclaimer:

In bestowing this degree, the University is not endorsing Mrs. Schlafly's views or opinions; rather, it is recognizing an alumna of the University whose life and work have had a broad impact on American life and have sparked widespread debate and controversies that in many cases have helped people better formulate and articulate their own views about the values they hold.

At the May 16, 2008, commencement ceremony, Schlafly was awarded an honorary degree of Doctor of Humane Letters, yet faculty and students protested to rescind Schlafly's honorary degree. During the ceremony, hundreds of the 14,000 people in attendance, including one-third of the graduating class and some faculty, silently stood and turned their backs to Schlafly in protest. In the days before the commencement there were protests regarding the awarding of an honorary degree; Schlafly described the protesters as "a bunch of losers". Moreover, after the ceremony, Schlafly said that the protesters were "juvenile" and "I'm not sure they're mature enough to graduate." As planned, Schlafly did not address the graduating class, nor did any other honored guest, except for the commencement speaker, news commentator Chris Matthews of MSNBC.

== Personal life ==
On October 20, 1949, she married attorney John Fred Schlafly Jr., a member of a wealthy St. Louis family. His grandfather, August, immigrated in 1854 from Switzerland. In the late 1870s, the three brothers founded the firm of Schlafly Bros., which dealt in groceries, Queensware (dishes made by Wedgwood), hardware, and agricultural implements. Fred and Phyllis Schlafly were both active Catholics. They linked Catholicism to Americanism and often exhorted Catholics to join the anti-communist crusade. She was also a member of the Daughters of the American Revolution.

Fred and Phyllis Schlafly moved across the Mississippi River to Alton, Illinois, and had six children: John, Bruce, Roger, Liza, Andrew, and Anne. When her husband died in 1993, she moved to Ladue, Missouri. In 1992, their eldest son, lawyer John Schlafly, was outed as gay by Queer Week magazine. He acknowledged that he was gay and stated that he agreed with his mother's opposition to same-sex marriage and extension of civil rights protection to gays and lesbians. Their son Andrew, also a lawyer and activist, created the wiki-based Conservapedia. Their daughter Anne Schlafly Cori, married to the son of Nobel-winning scientists Carl and Gerty Cori, is chairman and treasurer of Eagle Forum.

Schlafly was the aunt of conservative anti-feminist author Suzanne Venker; together they wrote The Flipside of Feminism: What Conservative Women Know – and Men Can't Say.

Schlafly died of cancer on September 5, 2016, at her home in Ladue, Missouri, at the age of 92.

== Published works ==
Schlafly was the author of 26 books on subjects ranging from child care to phonics education. She wrote a syndicated weekly newspaper column for Creators Syndicate.

Schlafly's published works include:

- A Choice Not an Echo (Pere Marquette Press, 1964) ISBN 0-686-11486-8
- Grave Diggers (with Chester Ward) (Pere Marquette Press, 1964) ISBN 0-934640-03-3
- Strike from Space: A Megadeath Mystery (Pere Marquette Press, 1965) ISBN 80-7507-634-6
- Safe Not Sorry (Pere Marquette Press, 1967) ISBN 0-934640-06-8
- The Betrayers (Pere Marquette Press, 1968) ISBN B0006CY0CQ
- Mindszenty the Man (with Josef Vecsey) (Cardinal Mindszenty Foundation, 1972) ISBN B00005WGD6
- Kissinger on the Couch (Arlington House Publishers, 1974) ISBN 0-87000-216-3
- Ambush at Vladivostok, with Chester Ward (Pere Marquette Press, 1976) ISBN 0-934640-00-9
- The Power of the Positive Woman (Crown Pub, 1977) ISBN 0-87000-373-9
- The Power of the Christian Woman (Standard Pub, 1981) ISBN B0006E4X12
- Equal Pay for Unequal Work (Eagle Forum, 1984) ISBN 99950-3-143-4
- Child Abuse in the Classroom (Crossway Books, 1984) ISBN 0-89107-365-5
- Pornography's Victims (Crossway Books, 1987) ISBN 0-89107-423-6
- Who Will Rock the Cradle?: The Battle for Control of Child Care in America (World Publications, 1989) ISBN 978-0849931987
- First Reader (Pere Marquette Press, 1994) ISBN 0-934640-24-6
- Turbo Reader (Pere Marquette Press, 2001) ISBN 0-934640-16-5
- Feminist Fantasies, foreword by Ann Coulter (Spence Publishing Company, 2003) ISBN 1-890626-46-5
- The Supremacists: The Tyranny of Judges and How to Stop It (Spence Publishing Company, 2004) ISBN 1-890626-55-4
- Judicial Tyranny: The New Kings of America? – contributing author (Amerisearch, 2005) ISBN 0-9753455-6-7
- The Flipside of Feminism: What Conservative Women Know—and Men Can't Say (WorldNetDaily, 2011) ISBN 978-1935071273
- No Higher Power: Obama's War on Religious Freedom (Regnery Publishing, 2012) ISBN 978-1621570127
- Who Killed the American Family? (WND Books, 2014) ISBN 978-1938067525
- A Choice Not an Echo: Updated and Expanded 50th Anniversary Edition (Regnery Publishing, 2014) ISBN 978-1621573159
- How the Republican Party Became Pro-Life (Dunrobin Publishing, 2016) ISBN 978-0-9884613-9-0
- The Conservative Case for Trump – posthumously, with Ed Martin and Brett M. Decker (Regnery Publishing, 2016) ISBN 978-1-62157-628-0

== In popular culture ==
Phyllis Schlafly, nicknamed "Phyllis Housefly", is referenced in Chapter 2 of Stephen King's 1986 novel It. When characters Adrian Mellon and Don Hagarty were discussing perceived homophobia in Derry, Adrian states that homophobia exists in every town in America due to being the age of "Ronnie Moron and Phyllis Housefly". The adult audience of 1986 would have recognized this as references to Ronald Reagan and Phyllis Schlafly.

Phyllis Schlafly is mentioned extensively in the seventh episode of the third season of the comedy TV series The Marvelous Mrs. Maisel, titled "Marvelous Radio". Set in 1960, the episode sees Midge (Rachel Brosnahan) agreeing to participate in a live radio commercial for Schlafly. Initially, Midge is enthusiastic about the prospect of supporting a woman running for Congress. However, after learning about her views, which are portrayed as ultra-conservative and antisemitic, she changes her mind and refuses to speak her part, while already at the recording studio with the broadcast about to start.

The FX miniseries Mrs. America also partially focuses on Schlafly's life and activism, with Cate Blanchett as her. Though some praise the series for its accuracy, Schlafly's family members, among other critics, dispute the accuracy of several accounts in the series.

Schlafly is briefly referred to in the Margaret Atwood novel The Testaments. The 2019 sequel to Atwood's The Handmaid's Tale, The Testaments is set in a dystopian theocratic state in which women are segregated by caste and social function, including wives, housekeepers, teachers, and impregnable women. In this setting there is a "Schlafly Café" which is open to women in the "Aunt" or teacher caste.

== Electoral history ==
=== U.S. House ===
1952

1952 Republican primary for Illinois's 24th congressional district
Party	Candidate	Votes	%
	Phyllis Stewart Schlafly	18,793	61.14
	John T. R. Godlewski	11,943	38.86
Total votes		30,736	100

1952 Illinois's 24th congressional district election
Party	Candidate	Votes	%
	Melvin Price (incumbent)	117,408	64.80
	Phyllis Stewart Schlafly	63,778	35.20
Total votes		181,186	100

1960

1960 Illinois's 24th congressional district election
Party	Candidate	Votes	%
	Melvin Price (incumbent)	144,560	72.22
	Phyllis Stewart Schlafly	55,620	27.79
Total votes		200,180	100

=== Republican National Convention delegate ===
Vote for delegates to the 1956 Republican National Convention from Illinois's 24th district
Candidate	Votes	%
Phyllis Stewart Schlafly	10,338	36.74
Wetzel G. Harness	6,445	22.91
Henry A. Schwarz	5,837	20.75
Horace J. Eggmann Jr.	3,539	12.58
Daniel H. Schade	1,977	7.03

Vote for delegates to the 1964 Republican National Convention from Illinois's 24th district
Candidate	Votes	%
Phyllis Stewart Schlafly	9,100	27.59
Ralph D. Walker	9,060	27.47
Rolla J. Mottaz	8,434	25.57
Dr. E. L. Rauth	6,389	19.37

Vote for delegates to the 1968 Republican National Convention from Illinois's 24th district
Candidate	Votes	%
James B. Wham	14,580	34.50
Phyllis Schlafly	14,356	33.97
Parker Graves	13,323	31.53

Vote for delegates to the 1972 Republican National Convention from Illinois's 20th congressional district
Prospective delegate	Presidential candidate they endorsed	Votes	%
Josephine K. Oblinger	Richard Nixon	22,282	32.54
Eric C. Davis	Richard Nixon	17,665	25.80
Andrew V. Madonia	Richard Nixon	17,057	24.91
Phyllis Schlafly	uncommitted	11,464	16.74

Vote for delegates to the 1984 Republican National Convention from Illinois's 21st congressional district
Prospective delegate	Presidential candidate they endorsed	Votes	%
Phyllis Schlafly	Ronald Reagan	13,873	35.42
Edward Ragsdale	Ronald Reagan	12,889	32.91
Wilson H. West	Ronald Reagan	12,405	31.67

Vote for delegates to the 1988 Republican National Convention from Illinois's 21st congressional district
Prospective delegate	Presidential candidate they endorsed	Votes	%
Don Weber	George H. W. Bush	8,694	14.92
J. Thomas Long	George H. W. Bush	8,251	14.16
Dennis Rickhoff	George H. W. Bush	7,685	13.19
Ron Stephens	Bob Dole	7,095	12.17
Craig S. MacDonald	Bob Dole	5,472	9.39
Edward F. Ragsdale	Bob Dole	5,125	8.79
Phyllis Schlafly	Jack Kemp	3,189	5.47
Michael Dyer	Pat Robertson	2,941	5.04
Frank C. Watson	Jack Kemp	2,873	4.93
Larry Baden	Pat Robertson	2,597	4.45
Cheryl McCalmon	Pat Robertson	2,561	4.39
Bob Glenn	Jack Kemp	1,778	3.05

Vote for delegates to the 1992 Republican National Convention from Illinois's 20th congressional district
Prospective delegate	Presidential candidate they endorsed	Votes	%
Marlalee I. Lindley	George H. W. Bush	31,038	15.97
Frank C. Watson	George H. W. Bush	30,943	15.92
Phyllis Schlafly	George H. W. Bush	30,892	15.90
Frank H. Walker	George H. W. Bush	30,825	15.86
Edward Ragsdale	George H. W. Bush	29,775	15.32
Bill Owens	Pat Buchanan	8,317	4.28
Mel Jones	Pat Buchanan	8,234	4.25
Lee Bormann	Pat Buchanan	8,234	4.23
William Charles Evers III	Pat Buchanan	8,1455	4.19
O. A. "Rockey" Schoenrock	Pat Buchanan	7,808	4.01

=== Republican National Convention alternate delegate ===
Vote for alternate delegates to the 1960 Republican National Convention from Illinois's 24th district
Candidate	Votes	%
Phyllis Stewart Schlafly	9,569	43.92
Robert D. Kecle	8,566	39.32
Henry Plats	3,653	16.77

== See also ==
- 1964 (film)
- Mrs. America, a TV miniseries based on Schlafly and her role on the Equal Rights Amendment; Schlafly is played by Cate Blanchett.
- Mary Whitehouse, British conservative activist

== Sources ==
- Critchlow, Donald T. Phyllis Schlafly and Grassroots Conservatism: A Woman's Crusade. Princeton University Press, 2005. ISBN 0-691-07002-4.
- Ehrenreich, Barbara. 1983. The Hearts of Men: American Dreams and the Flight from Commitment. New York: Anchor Books.
- Felsenthal, Carol. The Sweetheart of the Silent Majority: The Biography of Phyllis Schlafly. Doubleday, 1981. ISBN 0-89526-873-6.
