= Eagle Forum =

American conservative interest group

- Formation: 1972; 54 years ago
- Founder: Phyllis Schlafly
- Headquarters: Alton, Illinois; Washington, D.C.
- President: Kris Ullman
- Revenue: $239,244 (2023)
- Expenses: $332,333 (2023)
- Website: https://eagleforum.org/

Eagle Forum is a conservative advocacy group in the United States founded by Phyllis Schlafly in 1972. Focused on social issues, it is socially conservative, and describes itself as pro-family. Critics have described it as anti-feminist, anti-LGBT, ultraconservative, and far-right. A 501(c)(4) organization, it is affiliated with the Eagle Forum Education and Legal Defense Fund, which is a 501(c)(3) nonprofit, and the Eagle Forum Political Action Committee (PAC). It organizes the Eagle Council, an annual training for conservative speakers.

After Eagle Forum endorsed the Ted Cruz 2016 presidential campaign, board members, including Phyllis Schlafly, who supported the Donald Trump 2016 presidential campaign left the organization and founded Phyllis Schlafly Eagles, a 501(c)(4), and Phyllis Schlafly's Eagle PAC.

== History ==
In 1967, Phyllis Schlafly launched the Eagle Trust Fund for receiving donations related to conservative causes. After the 1972 proposal of the Equal Rights Amendment (ERA), Schlafly reorganized her efforts to defeat its ratification, founding the group "Stop ERA" and starting the Eagle Forum Newsletter. In 1975, Stop ERA was renamed the Eagle Forum. The Eagle Forum was part of the New Right in the 1970s, which emphasized social issues important to the Christian right in the conservative movement. A similar group, Concerned Women for America, formed in 1979, and both grew after the election of Ronald Reagan in 1981.

The Eagle Forum Education and Legal Defense Fund was organized in 1981 as a non-profit wing of Eagle Forum. It is a tax deductible charity under Internal Revenue Service (IRS) code. In 1994, the Eagle Forum’s political action committee raised $250,000 for Senate and House of Representatives candidates. In the mid-2000s, Eagle Forum, along with the John Birch Society, mobilized conservative opposition to a so-called North American Union and the Security and Prosperity Partnership of North America. As a result of two organizations' activities, 23 state legislatures saw bills introduced condemning the NAU while the Bush and Obama administrations were deterred “from any grand initiatives.”

Eagle Forum members have often worked within the Republican Party. The Texas state Eagle Forum chairperson, Cathie Adams, was named Republican national committeewoman from Texas at the state convention in 2008 and then, in October 2009, was chosen as interim chairperson of the Republican Party of Texas. In 2015, Ed Martin was appointed to succeed Phyllis Schlafly as President of the Eagle Forum, but was removed from the position in 2016.

=== Phyllis Schlafly Eagles ===
Disputes among Eagle Forum leaders, including some of Schlafly's children, resulted in court battles, starting in 2016. Board members who supported the Donald Trump 2016 presidential campaign left the organization and founded Phyllis Schlafly Eagles, a different 501(c)(4) organization. Phyllis Schlafly Eagles also established a political action committee, Phyllis Schlafly's Eagle PAC.

Leaders of the organizations sued each other over use of organizational mailing lists, use of Schlafly's name and image, and related issues. In 2017, Eagle Forum declared that Ed Martin, John Schlafly, Andy Schlafly, and Kathleen Sullivan no longer have any connection to Eagle Forum. Ed Martin, president of the Phyllis Schlafly Eagles and the Eagle Forum Education & Legal Defense Fund, served as the Republican National Committee deputy platform policy director in 2024.

== Political and social positions ==
The Eagle Forum is involved in conservative issues. The Eagle Forum supports English-only education in schools. It opposes federal support for daycare and sex education. Schlafly described the Eagle Forum as an alternative to women's liberation. It is opposed to a number of feminist issues, which founder Phyllis Schlafly claimed were "extremely destructive" and "poisoned the attitudes of many young women." The organization believes only in a family consisting of a father, mother and children. They are supportive of women's right to choose to be "fulltime homemakers", and oppose same-sex marriage. Eagle Forum is anti-abortion. It has defended the push for government defunding of Planned Parenthood.

=== Opposition to the ERA ===
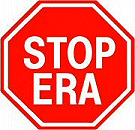
Symbol used for signs and buttons by ERA opponents

After gaining publicity for her book, A Choice, Not an Echo, Phyllis Schlafly began her fight against the ratification of the proposed Equal Rights Amendment (ERA). The ERA had passed in the United States House of Representatives by a vote of 354 to 23. Five months later, the amendment passed in the Senate with a vote of 84 to 8, and 7 members abstaining. In order to be adopted into the Constitution, the amendment had to be ratified by three-fourths (38) of the states. Schlafly then reorganized her efforts to defeat its ratification, founding the group "STOP ERA" and starting the Eagle Forum Newsletter. STOP ERA was established in the fall of 1972 an organization dedicated to the defeat of the Equal Rights Amendment. The group's name is an acronym for the phrase "Stop Taking Our Privileges".

In one issue of the Eagle Forum Newsletter, titled "Whats Wrong With Equal Rights for Women", Schlafly argued against the ratification of the ERA on the basis that it would take rights and protections away from women. According to Schlafly, the passage of the ERA could "mean Government-funded abortions, homosexual schoolteachers, women forced into military combat and men refusing to support their wives." The newsletter began to circulate, and many conservative women wrote to their legislators, relaying the concerns voiced by Schlafly in the Eagle Forum Newsletter. Support for The Eagle Forum grew with the support of many conservative women and various church groups, as did the opposition to the ERA. Many of the same women who had helped Schlafly distribute her book were involved with STOP ERA. Less than a year after its creation, STOP ERA had grown to several thousand members.

State legislators were able to vote on the ERA beginning in March 1972 and were given a deadline in 1979. Within a year, thirty states had ratified the ERA, and the amendment needed only eight more states to pass. In 1977, STOP ERA protested the Equal Rights Amendment at the 1977 National Women's Conference in Houston, Texas. STOP ERA claimed that the national plan of action that was proposed at the conference was "anti-family". At the conference, Phyllis Schlafly teamed up with Indiana State Senator Joan Gubbins to form a "pro-life, pro-family" coalition to voice the conservative opposition to the ERA. Schlafly also testified against the potentially harmful effects of the ERA before Georgia, Virginia, Missouri, and Arkansas legislatures. STOP ERA's tactics were successful; by the 1979 deadline the amendment still needed three states to pass. The ERA was then given a three-year extension, during which no states ratified or rescinded the amendment. By the time of the ERA's defeat, the Eagle Forum had reached 50,000 members.

Since its initial defeat, the Equal Rights Amendment has been revisited by legislators, such as Carolyn Maloney. In March 2021, a United States Federal court ruled that the window of time to ratify the ERA had expired and recent efforts by Nevada, Illinois and Virginia to support ratification are "too late to count".

== Programs and activities ==
The Forum has a "Teen Eagles" program for children ages 13–19, and "Eagle Forum Collegians" for conservative-minded college students. Phyllis Schlafly's son, Andrew Schlafly, started Conservapedia, a wiki-based encyclopedia project, with students from an "Eagle Forum University" project. There are also state chapters of the Eagle Forum, such as the Utah Eagle Forum led by Gayle Ruzicka.

== See also ==
- Elaine Donnelly
- Project 2025
- Women in conservatism in the United States
