= Mama grizzly =

2010s political term

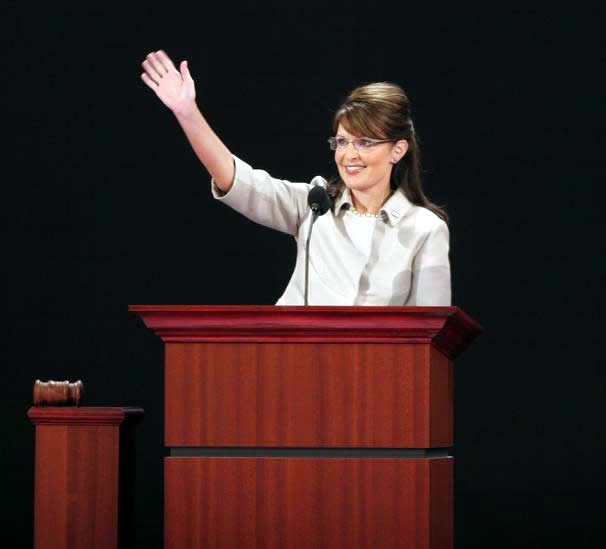
Sarah Palin addresses the 2008 Republican National Convention, which was held in Saint Paul, Minnesota.

Mama grizzly is a term that former U.S. vice presidential candidate and Alaska governor Sarah Palin coined to refer to herself that has since been applied to female candidates she supported or endorsed in the 2010 U.S. midterm elections (collectively called mama grizzlies). Palin first used the term in a May 2010 speech at a fundraiser for the Susan B. Anthony List, an anti-abortion women's group, and used it in a July 2010 YouTube video produced by SarahPAC, Palin's political action committee, for the 2010 elections. The persona largely served as a device by which Palin could "blend [her] feminine and masculine qualities and capabilities." By September 2010, mama grizzly was deemed to be "part of the lexicon" of the election by Newsweek magazine. It has never been made clear if the term is meant to refer to all women candidates supported by the former governor, or if it is just a general concept about real-life moms entering politics because they fear for their children's future.

== Background ==
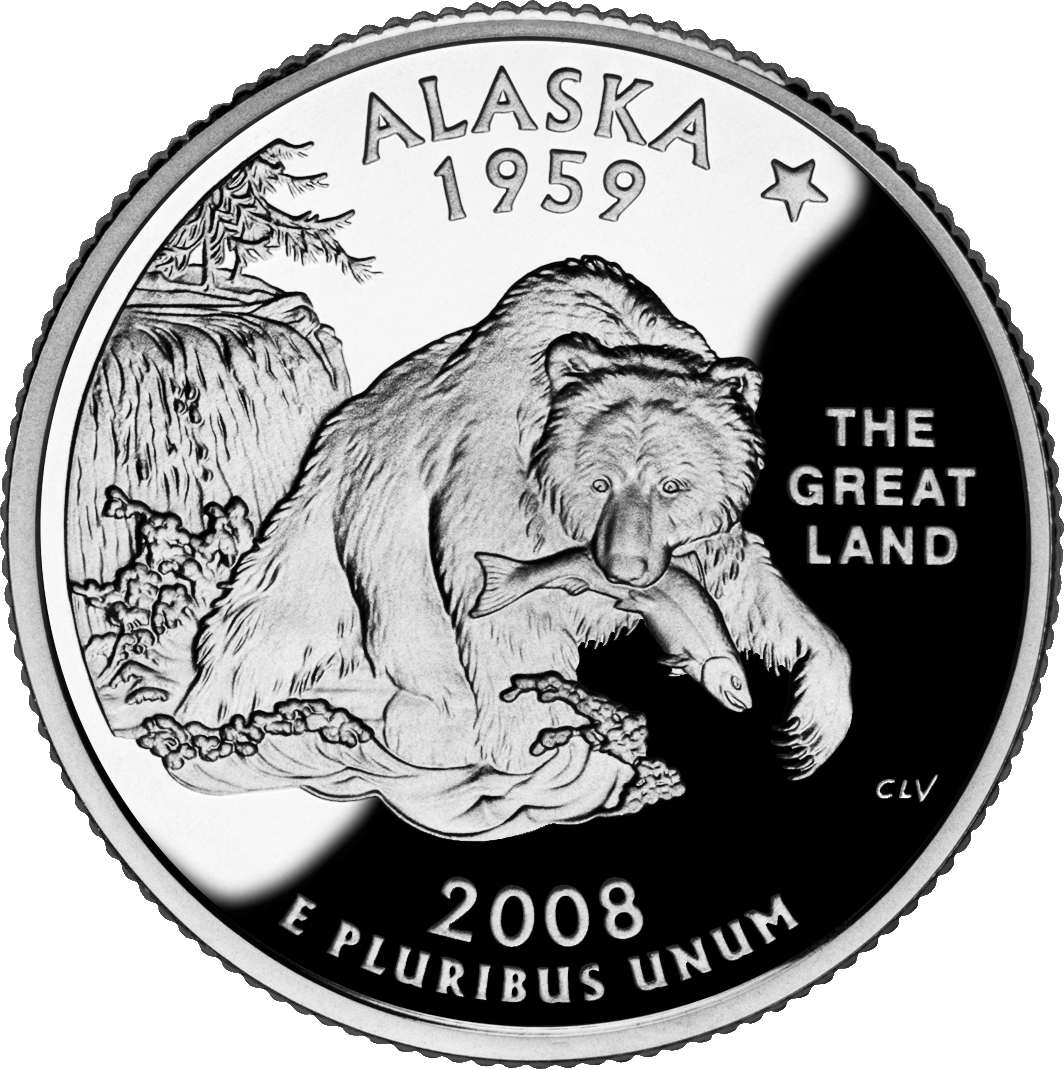
As Alaska governor, Palin chose a grizzly bear design for Alaska's state quarter, which was minted in 2008.

The grizzly bear (Ursus arctos horribilis), a subspecies of the brown bear (Ursus arctos), is known for its aggressiveness; females are especially protective of their young. The state of Alaska is home to more than 70 percent of the grizzly population in the world.

During her tenure as Governor, Palin chose a design showing a grizzly bear grasping a salmon in its mouth as Alaska's contribution to the 50 State Quarters series of commemorative coins. At the April 2007 unveiling of the design, Palin said, "I like to think this is a mama grizzly doing what she does best: taking care of her young."

== Usage ==
=== Palin as a mama grizzly ===
Nearly one year later, while promoting the Alaska natural gas pipeline project to federal officials in Washington D.C., Palin said, "Don't tell me that we should ever be on our knees to any dictator because of our desperation for energy, not when we have supplies here at home." Referring to her son's imminent deployment to the Iraq War zone, she added, "This mama grizzly ... has more reason than ever to protect our young."

By October 2008, Palin's usage of the bear metaphor to describe herself was reported in a New York Times article, "Provoking Palin's Inner Bear," which quotes her as saying that negative media coverage about her children makes, "the mama grizzly bear in me [come] out, makes me want to rear up on my hind legs and say, 'Wait a minute.'" Soon, other media outlets began picking up on Palin's self-description. In January 2009, Margery Eagan of the Boston Herald penned a column, "Unbearable Mama Grizzly clawing way to Oval Office" in which she noted that a YouTube interview of Palin had nearly three quarters of a million views, proving "that mama 'grizzly,' as she called herself, remains irresistible." The Vancouver, Washington newspaper, The Columbian, commented in January 2009 that, "Sarah Palin is on the prowl, snorting that when the media poke fun at her family, it brings out the mama grizzly in her." The connection between Palin and mama grizzly was made internationally in July 2009 when the New Delhi, India-based Hindustan Times reported on a Palin tweet describing mama grizzly bears in Alaska. In August 2009, an opinion piece in The Columbian suggested that Sarah Palin could serve as a Mama Grizzly head of a third or a fourth U.S. political party.

=== Palin-endorsed candidates as mama grizzlies ===
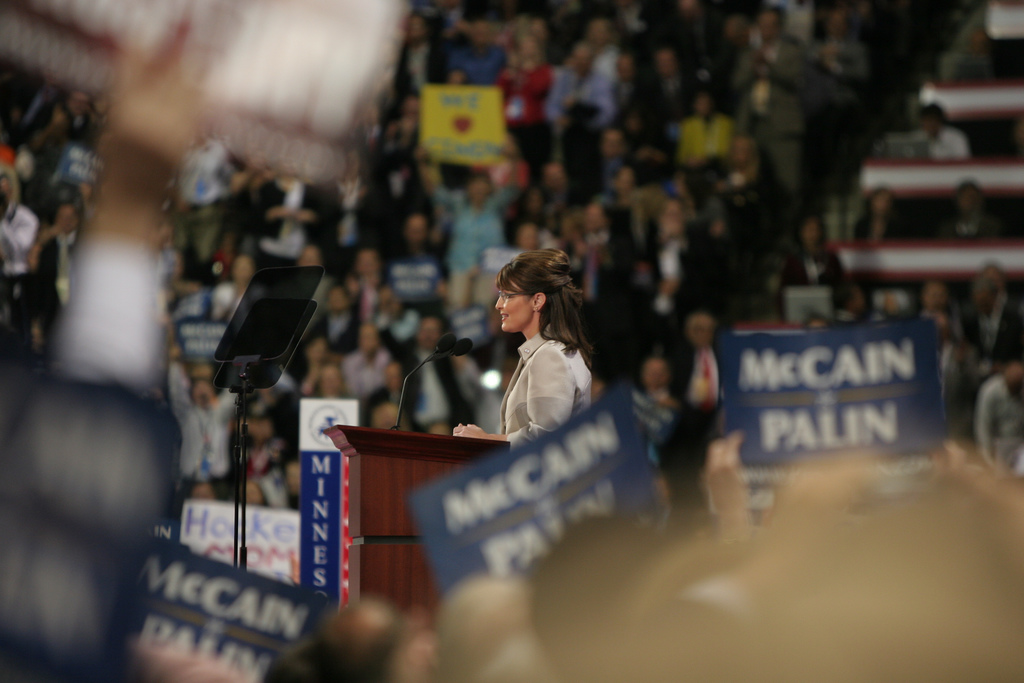
Palin addressing the 2008 Republican National Convention. During her speech, she called herself a "pit bull".

Speaking before the anti-abortion Susan B. Anthony List organization in May 2010, Palin called certain novice female political candidates running in the 2010 election "momma grizzlies". Referring to her earlier self-description as a "pit-bull" in the 2008 U.S. Presidential election, she said,

If you thought pit bulls were tough, you don't want to mess with mama grizzlies.

Later that day, Shannon Bream of the Fox News Channel reported that, "Palin says, women who she calls Mama Grizzlies will lead a national Republican wave in November." In July 2010, Palin's political action committee, SarahPAC, released a video pushing the mama grizzly meme as representing herself and "her fiercely independent, common sense conservative" candidates. The day after the 2010 midterm elections, Palin released a video showing a montage of her winning grizzly candidates, a roaring grizzly bear, and narration in which she says "this is our morning in America".

Publications such as Newsweek explored the impact of "Mama Grizzlies" on the 2010 election cycle, prominently featuring Palin-endorsed women candidates such as Michele Bachmann, Nikki Haley, Sharron Angle and Christine O'Donnell in cover art and photos accompanying the story.

The 2010 general elections placed a historic number of Republican women in Congress and "many were also ... heralded by Sarah Palin as being 'Mama Grizzlies.'" However, these women did not affiliate themselves with the term or discussions about gendered identities at all.

== Criticism ==
Emily's List, a political action committee that supports pro-choice female candidates, launched a website and a video ad called "Sarah Doesn't Speak for Me," to oppose Palin, her "radical agenda," and the candidates she had endorsed. In the video, women dressed as bears say they are "mama grizzlies" who fight for their cubs' right to choose, and that is why they oppose Palin and her candidates. Politico reporter Andy Barr described the ad as an attempt "to raise money off of Sarah Palin and the vitriol that she inspires".

New York Times columnist Gail Collins said the use of the term made it seem as if there were more female Republican candidates running for high office than there actually were, and remarked that their Democratic counterparts "suffer from the lack of a cool name".

In September 2010, Newsweek reported that mama grizzly was now "a familiar part of the lexicon" but questioned whether the grizzly candidates stood for policies that were good for women and children.

== Other uses ==
On August 23, 2010, The Washington Post published an article titled "In South Dakota, Democrats' own 'mama grizzly' vs. 'the next Sarah Palin'" which used the term to refer to South Dakota's Democratic party nominee for U.S. Representative, Stephanie Herseth Sandlin, as well as its Republican nominee, Kristi Noem, though at the time the article was written, neither candidate had been endorsed by Palin.

In Slate, Noreen Malone used the term to describe conservative women at the Smart Girl Summit, and their effective use of social networking in 2010 political campaigns.

== See also ==
- Hockey mom
- NASCAR dad
- Tea Party movement
- Tea Party protests
- Women in conservatism in the United States
- Pastel QAnon
