= Suzanne Venker =

American author

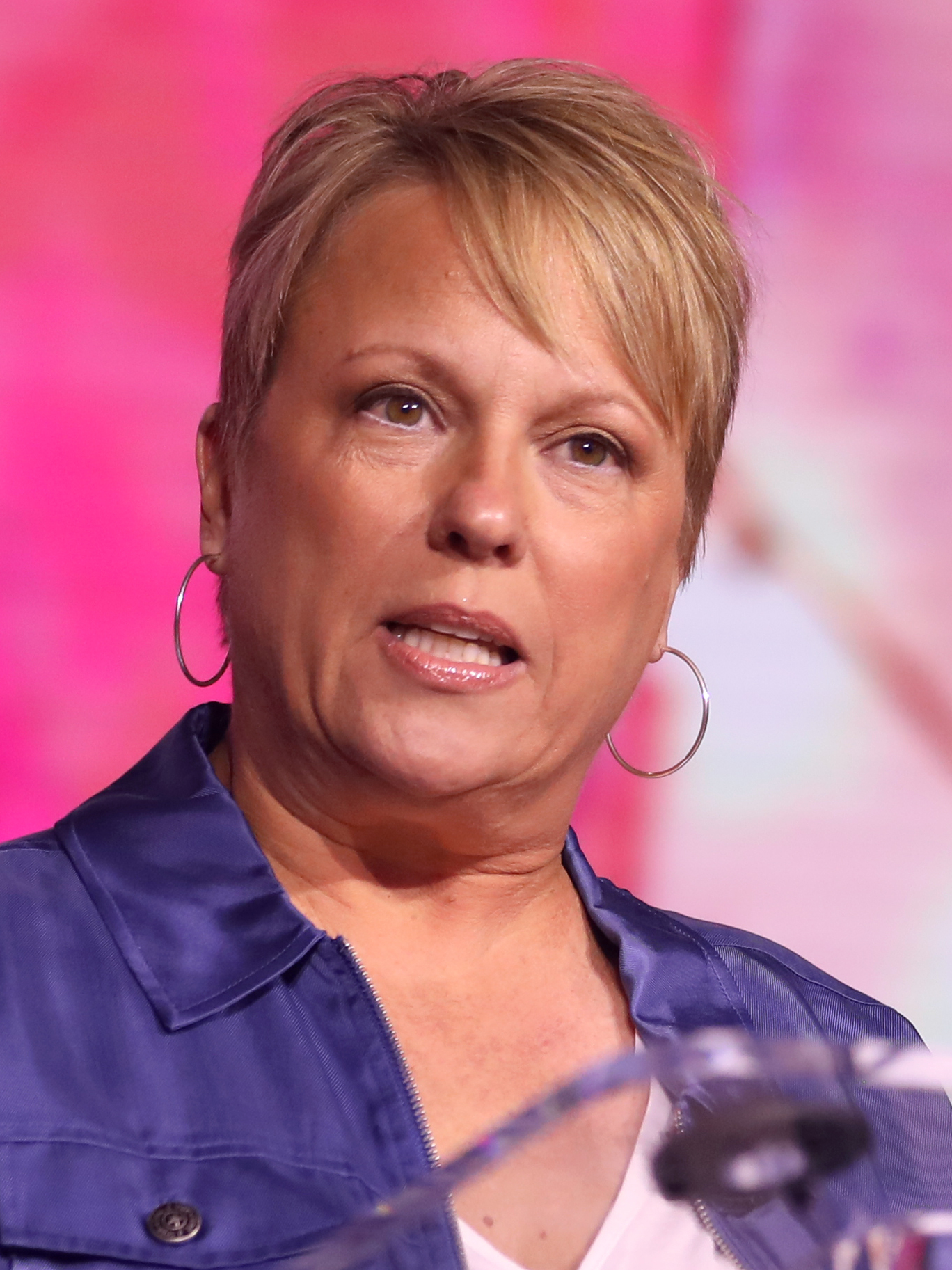
- Venker in 2024
- Born: 1968 (age 57–58); St. Louis, Missouri, U.S.
- Education: Boston University (BA)
- Relatives: Phyllis Schlafly (aunt)
- Writing career
- Genre: Non-fiction
- Subject: Criticism of feminism
- Website: suzannevenker.com

Suzanne Venker (born March 28, 1968), is an American non-fiction author and radio host at KXFN. She has authored several books.

She co-wrote The Flipside of Feminism: What Conservative Women Know – and Men Can't Say with her aunt, the conservative lawyer and activist Phyllis Schlafly.

== Selected works ==
- Venker, Suzanne (2004). 7 Myths of Working Mothers: Why Children and (Most) Careers Just Don't Mix. Dallas, Texas: Spence Pub. Co. ISBN 9781890626532.

- Review: Karnick, S.T. (2004). "BOOK TALK - "7 Myths of Working Mothers: Why Children and (Most) Careers Just Don't Mix" by Suzanne Venker". The American Enterprise. 15 (7). American Enterprise Institute: 54. OCLC 98497992. Archived from the original on February 7, 2005.

- Venker, Suzanne; Schlafly, Phyllis (2011). The Flipside of Feminism: What Conservative Women Know – and Men Can't Say. Washington, D.C. New York: WND Books. ISBN 9781935071273.
- Venker, Suzanne (2013). The War on Men. Washington, D.C.: WND Books. ISBN 9781938067181.
- Venker, Suzanne (2013). How to Choose a Husband: And Make Peace With Marriage. Washington, D.C. New York: WND Books. ISBN 9781936488957.
- Venker, Suzanne (2017). The Alpha Female's Guide to Men and Marriage: How Love Works. New York, New York: Post Hill Press. ISBN 9781618688446.
- Venker, Suzanne (2019). Women Who Win at Love: How to Build a Relationship that Lasts. New York, New York: Post Hill Press. ISBN 9781642931044.
