= Josephine Oblinger =

American lawyer and politician

Josephine Kneidel (née Harrington) Oblinger (February 14, 1913 – September 27, 1998) was an American lawyer and politician.

Born in Chicago, Illinois, Oblinger received her bachelor's degree from University of Illinois and her law degree from University of Detroit Mercy School of Law. In Detroit, Michigan, she worked at the Legal Aid Bureau and taught high school. From 1977 to 1978, Oblinger was director of the Illinois Department of Aging and practiced law. From 1979 to 1985, Oblinger served in the Illinois House of Representatives and was a Republican.
