= A Choice Not an Echo =

1964 book by Phyllis Schlafly

- Author: Phyllis Schlafly
- Publication date: 1964

A Choice Not an Echo is a non-fiction book self-published in 1964 by movement conservative activist Phyllis Schlafly. It was the first of Schlafly's 19 books and sold three million copies, bringing her to national attention as a conservative activist. Schlafly published this book to support Arizona Senator Barry Goldwater in his presidential candidacy, hoping to help him triumph in the California primary, cementing his chances for obtaining the Republican party nomination. Schlafly's secondary motivation behind the publishing of A Choice Not an Echo was to break control of the "Eastern Establishment" over the Republican Party. In other words, her book served as an exposure of the covert influence that, in her word, "kingmakers" had on Republican primary nominations.

== Inspiration for A Choice Not an Echo ==
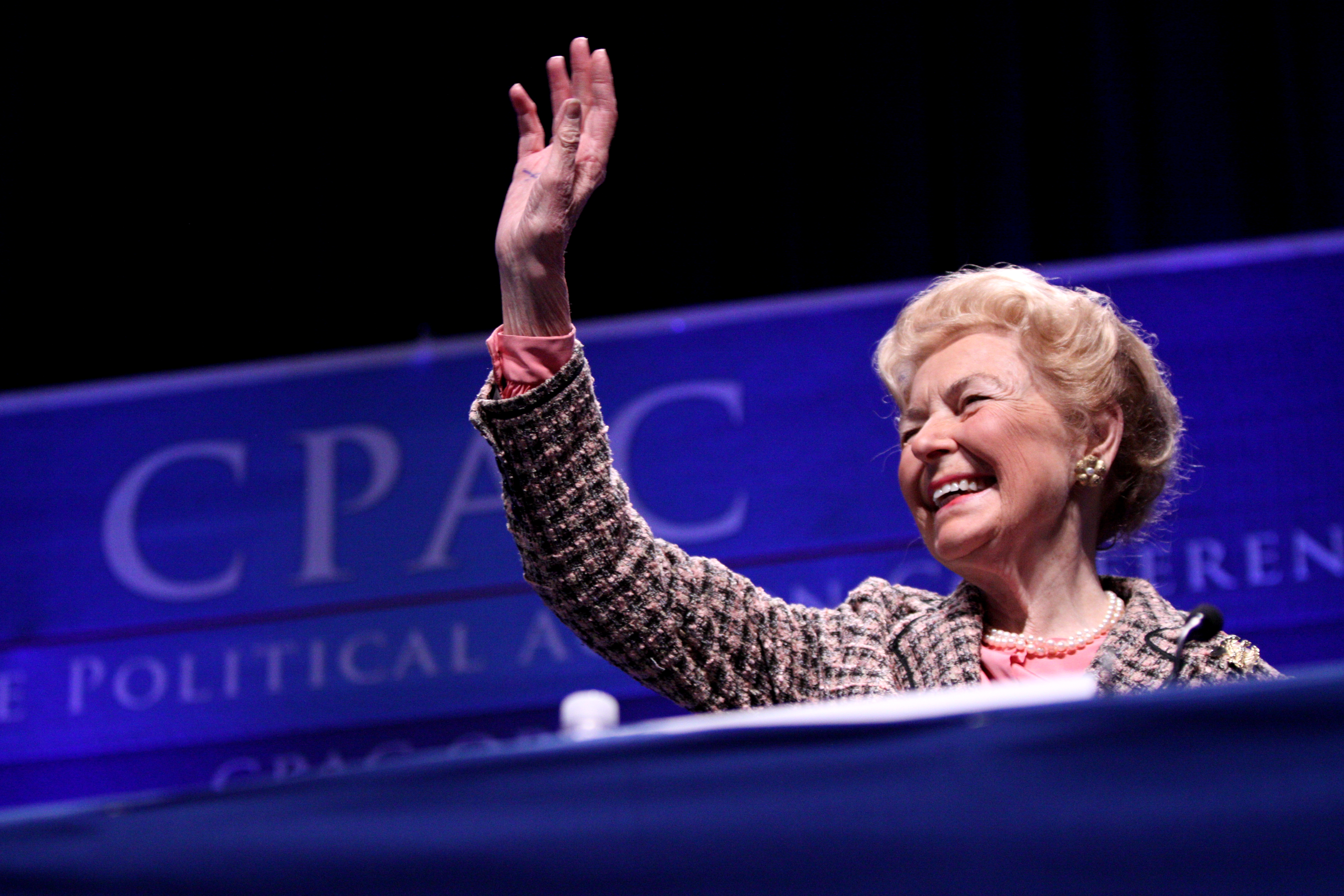
Phyllis Schlafly speaking at CPAC in 2011

Prior to 1963, Phyllis Schlafly had prepared a whole series of Republican speeches that she hoped to deliver. However, after the assassination of John F. Kennedy, she deemed it inappropriate to give anti-Democratic speeches. Accordingly, Schlafly instead wrote a speech entitled "How Political Conventions Are Stolen" (which reflected on the liberal Rockefeller administration in New York and how it had outmaneuvered the party's Conservative wing) in December 1963 and delivered it throughout January and February the following year. Schlafly hoped to have a permanent effect so she converted this speech into a book, which became A Choice Not an Echo. By establishing her own publisher, the Pere Marquette Press, Schlafly was able to quickly self-publish her book, which she distributed in mass quantities. By the weekend after publication, Schlafly's book had statewide distribution in California and eventually had sold over half a million copies by May of that year, helping to support Goldwater's campaign.

== Historical context ==
Throughout the 1940s, 50s, and 60s, Democrats maintained control of the executive office, with the exception of the 1953–1961 Eisenhower presidency. The Republican party had often been split between a conservative wing supported in the Midwest and West, and liberal wing from the Northeast. The conservative wing, which Schlafly was a part of, opposed New Deal reforms and supported isolationist policies. This wing was represented by candidates such as Robert A. Taft in 1948. On the other side, the liberal wing of the Republican party demanded more efficient use of New Deal policies and were led by Thomas E. Dewey, who Schlafly claims was subject to the will of the kingmakers. The liberal wing maintained control of the Republican Presidential nomination until 1964.

In 1964, the conservative wing made a comeback against the liberal wing by nominating Barry Goldwater. Goldwater defeated Nelson Rockefeller and Henry Cabot Lodge Jr., who were on the left side of the GOP. However, Goldwater was defeated by Johnson in the 1964 election.

== 1964 Republican primaries ==
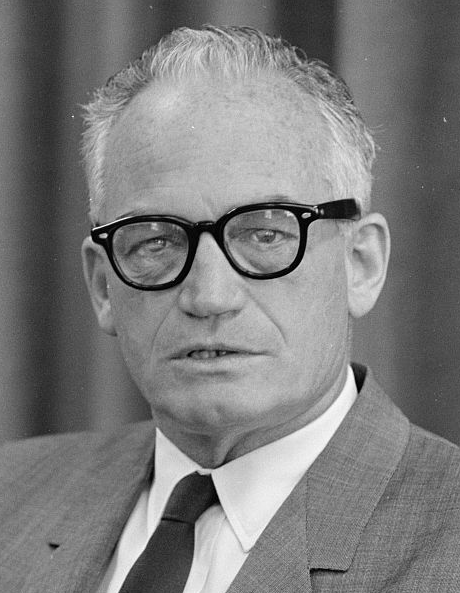
Senator Barry Goldwater in 1962

Phyllis Schlafly's A Choice Not an Echo was a key factor in Barry Goldwater's securing of the 1964 Republican nomination. In preceding months, Goldwater was close to winning the nomination, but needed to win a major primary in order to do so. The California primary, therefore, was key if Goldwater were to win the Republican nomination. The liberal New York governor Nelson Rockefeller opposed Goldwater in the California primary. Conservative lobbyists and volunteers traveled to various precincts and handed out copies of A Choice Not an Echo. Schlafly's book was evidently very influential: later studies showed that Goldwater had secured narrow victories in many of these precincts. Goldwater won the California primary, and got the Republican presidential nomination.

== Content ==
The first appearance of the "kingmakers" is in Chapter 5. "The Advertising Agent's Holiday" describes how Wendell Willkie, who was a registered Democrat, was marketed into becoming the 1940 Republican presidential candidate by the kingmakers, who were very prominent business and economic figures during the time. Willkie began appearing on the covers of magazines and newspapers, and was placed on panels where the questions were tailored specifically to his knowledge. This type of marketing ensured that he appeared to outsmart other intellectuals on the panels. Despite this marketing, when the Republican National Convention was seven weeks away, Willkie was only favored by 3% of Republicans. When the Republican National Convention arrived, the kingmakers launched "Operation Telegram". In this operation, prominent and financially powerful people were called and asked if they would like to send a telegram to the delegates at the Republican National Convention on their behalf. As a result of this, almost a million telegrams flooded the delegates at the convention in favor of Willkie. In addition, cab drivers picking up delegates and taking them to the convention were paid to hint that the nomination was leaning towards Willkie. The combination of these strategies worked, and Willkie won the presidential nomination, with Taft and Dewey trailing behind.

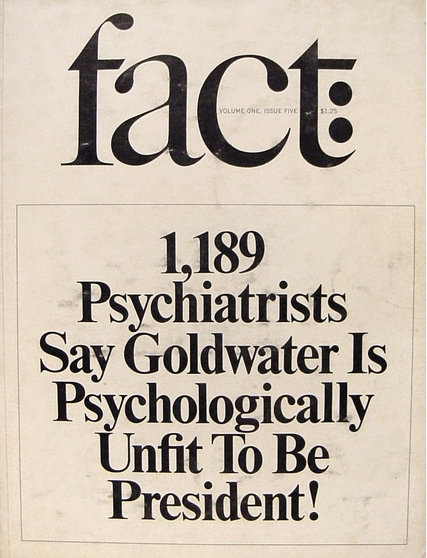
Flyer used to challenge Goldwater's campaign

Chapter 12 of A Choice Not an Echo is titled "Anybody but Goldwater". In this chapter of her book, Schlafly focuses in on the work of the kingmakers' attempts to prevent Goldwater from securing the Republican popular vote. For example, Schlafly references "The chief propaganda organ of the secret kingmakers, The New York Times", demonstrating the tension between Goldwater and the Eastern establishment with a quote from a "surprisingly candid" article by Tom Wicker:

The most bitter resistance to Senator Goldwater centers in the eastern, internationalist power structure that for two decades has dictated Republican nominations. The members of that elite will not lightly relinquish their party to Barry Goldwater.

Schlafly also references other magazines that have published "anti-Goldwater" texts such as The New Yorker and The Saturday Evening Post. More specifically, Schlafly references an article published in The Saturday Evening Post on January 25, 1964 called "How the Republicans Can Win" by Arthur Larson, that advises the GOP to select a candidate who appeals to the "Authentic American Center" (specifically referencing John F. Kennedy at the time).

Aside from "anti-Goldwater propaganda", Schlafly reveals other strategies used by the kingmakers to keep Goldwater out of the race. For example, the kingmakers posed candidates such as Nelson Rockefeller and George Romney whose main motivation to run for president would be to "do everything within my power to prevent him (Goldwater) from becoming the party's presidential choice." Another candidate who posed a threat to Goldwater's campaign was William W. Scranton, who was Governor of Pennsylvania from 1963–1967. The kingmakers invested a lot of attention in Governor Scranton, "showing off Scranton to leading banking, industrial and communications figures in a series of private luncheons." These exclusive meetings included extremely influential individuals who would help bolster Scranton's campaign.

== Effects of A Choice Not an Echo ==
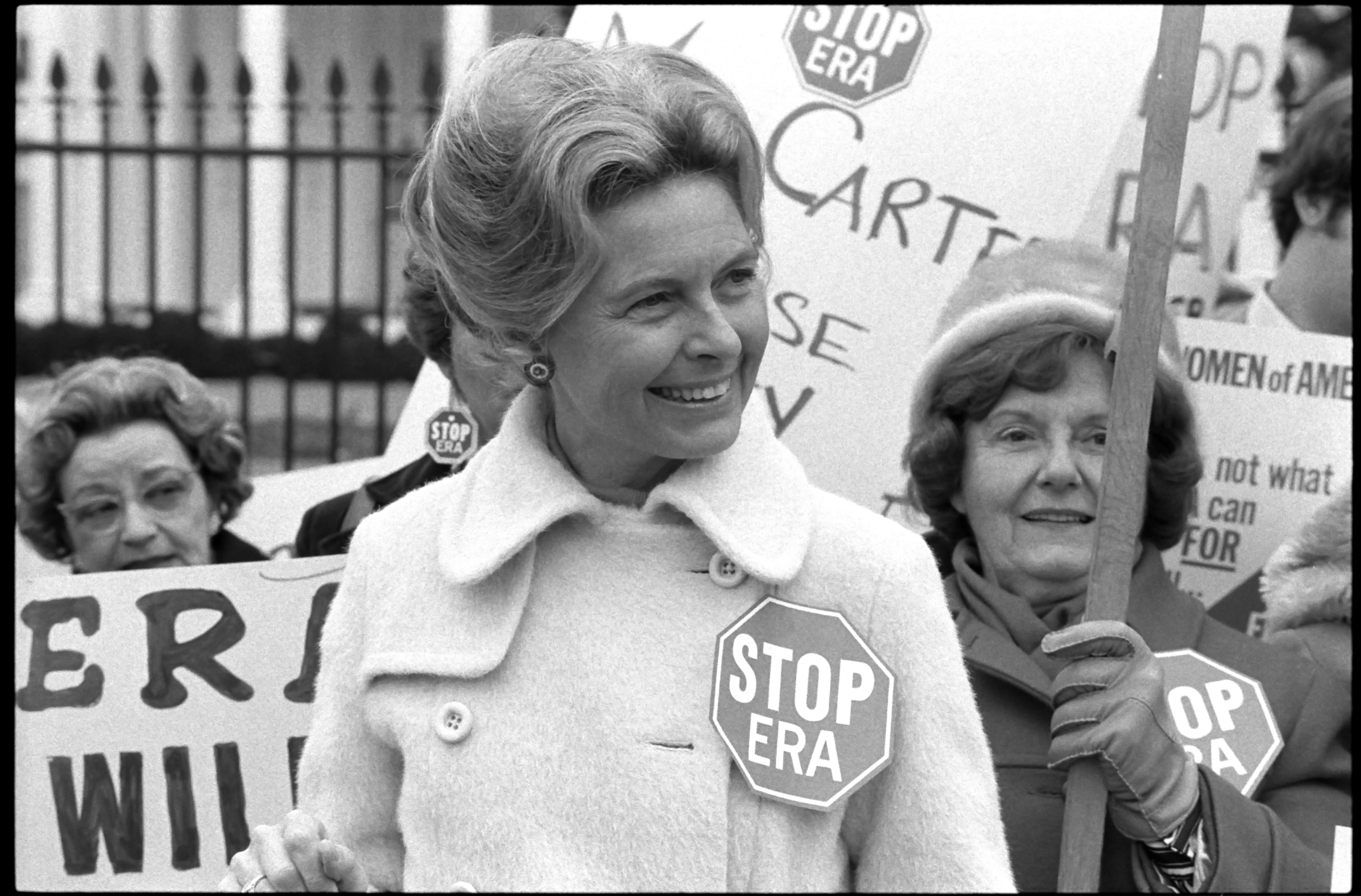
Phyllis Schlafly wearing a "STOP ERA" badge at an anti-ERA rally on February 4, 1977

The book helped create space within the Republican Party for the modern conservative movement that eventually stopped the passage of the Equal Rights Amendment in the 1970s. The book helped secure the nomination of Senator Barry Goldwater for President of the United States, and detailed how the liberal "Rockefeller Republican" wing of the Republican Party had manipulated the Republican Party's choice of nominees in prior national conventions to nominate people like Wendell Willkie and Dwight D. Eisenhower. It called on conservatives to rally against the liberal wing and offer a true conservative for the nomination. Millions of copies of this book were bought and distributed by supporters of Goldwater, making it one of the all-time best selling conservative political books in the United States. The book helped launch the career of Phyllis Schlafly as a movement conservative.

The 50th anniversary edition, A Choice Not an Echo: Updated and Expanded 50th Anniversary Edition, was published in 2014 by Regnery Publishing, ISBN 978-1621573159. The 1964 book was published by the Pere Marquette Press, and has the ISBN ISBN 0-686-11486-8.
