= G. Edward Griffin =

American conspiracy theorist, film producer, author, and political lecturer

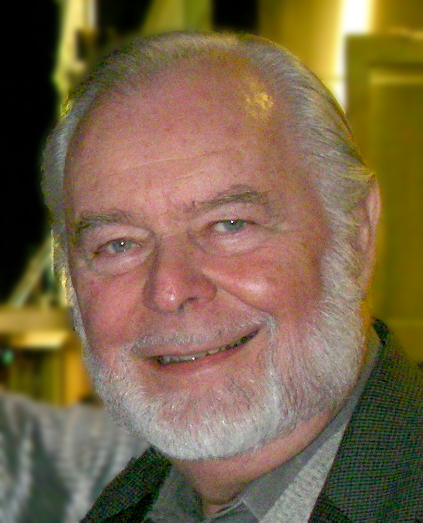
- Born: George Edward Griffin; November 7, 1931 (age 94); Detroit, Michigan, U.S.
- Education: University of Michigan (BA)
- Occupations: Author, filmmaker, lecturer
- Known for: Conspiracy theories
- Spouse: Patricia Irving Griffin

George Edward Griffin (born November 7, 1931) is an American author, filmmaker, lecturer, and a conspiracy theorist. Griffin's writings promote a number of right-wing views and conspiracy theories regarding politics, defense and health care. In his book World Without Cancer, he argued in favor of a pseudo-scientific theory that asserted cancer to be a nutritional deficiency curable by consuming amygdalin. He is the author of The Creature from Jekyll Island (1994), which advances debunked conspiracy theories about the Federal Reserve System. He is an HIV/AIDS denialist, supports the 9/11 Truth movement, and supports the specific John F. Kennedy assassination conspiracy theory that Oswald was not the assassin. He also believes that the Biblical Noah's Ark is located at the Durupınar site in Turkey.

== Biography ==
=== Early life ===
Griffin was born in Detroit, Michigan, on November 7, 1931, and became a child voice actor on local radio from 1942 to 1947. He later emceed at WJR (CBS), and continued as an assistant announcer at the public radio station WUOM. He earned his bachelor's degree from the University of Michigan in Ann Arbor in 1953, majoring in speech and communications. In 1954, he served in the United States Army, and in 1956 was Honorably Discharged as a Sergeant.

Griffin worked as a writer for Curtis LeMay, vice presidential running mate for George Wallace during his 1968 United States Presidential campaign.

=== Publishing ===
Griffin wrote and produced a number of documentary-style videos covering controversial topics similar in theme to his books. His films covered a wide range of topics including communism, espionage, the historical authenticity of Noah's Ark, the Federal Reserve System, the Supreme Court of the United States, terrorism, subversion, foreign policy, electronic voting fraud, cancer, and the chemtrail conspiracy theory.

Griffin created and ran a number of organizations that published a variety of print and audiovisual media, such as American Media and Reality Zone, in Thousand Oaks and Westlake Village, California.

Many of Griffin's books and films were published by other organizations such as Robert Welch's American Opinion in Belmont, Massachusetts, and Western Islands in Boston. Griffin also produced printed works and films with Major General John K. Singlaub, publisher and national security journalist John H. Rees, and U.S. Congressman Larry McDonald at the Western Goals Foundation, a private domestic intelligence agency active in the United States beginning in 1979.

Griffin wrote and directed the anti-civil rights movie 'Anarchy USA' for the John Birch Society in 1966. Anarchy USA posited that the Civil rights movement was a Communist front to spread Marxist revolution into America and calls the Voting Rights Act of 1965 a step towards tyranny.

=== The Creature from Jekyll Island ===
Griffin's 1994 book, The Creature from Jekyll Island, draws parallels between the Federal Reserve and a bird of prey.

Griffin presented his views on the U.S. money system and opposition to the Federal Reserve system in his 1993 movie and 1994 book, The Creature from Jekyll Island. (Note: The title refers to a 1910 meeting at Jekyll Island, Georgia, of six bankers and economic policymakers, which did occur.) In it, he presents his argument that the central banking system of the United States constitutes a banking cartel and an instrument of war and totalitarianism. The book was a business-topic bestseller, and influenced Ron Paul when he wrote a chapter on money and the Federal Reserve in his New York Times bestseller, The Revolution: A Manifesto.

==== Criticism ====
Edward Flaherty, an academic economist writing for Political Research Associates, characterized Griffin's description of the secret meeting on Jekyll Island as "amateurish" and "highly suspect". Jesse Walker, the books editor for Reason magazine, says the book has grains of truth but "reduce[s] things too much to a certain narrative, where the mustache-twirlers are behind everything." Peter Conti-Brown of The Wharton School and The Brookings Institution identifies the book as "the leading popular account of the conspiracists", noting that "while [they] hit their target in noting the existence and significance of the Jekyll Island meeting, [...] the 'creature' established [...] bore little relationship, from a governance standpoint, to the Federal Reserve System." In his words, the book should be referenced "for entertainment but not information". In a movie review for the New York Times, Jeannette Catsoulis wrote that the book "has been debunked".

=== Political advocacy ===
In 1964, Griffin wrote his first book, The Fearful Master, on the United Nations, a topic that recurs throughout his writings. While he describes his work as the output of "a plain vanilla researcher," Griffin also agrees with the Los Angeles Daily News's characterization of him as "Crusader Rabbit".

Griffin has been a member and officer of the John Birch Society (JBS) for much of his life and a contributing editor to its magazine, The New American. Since the 1960s, Griffin has spoken and written about the Society's theory of history involving "communist and capitalist conspiracies" over banking systems (including the Federal Reserve System), international banking, United States foreign policy, the U.S. military–industrial complex, the American news and entertainment media as propaganda, the Supreme Court of the United States, and the United Nations. From 1962 to 1975, he completed nine books and seven film productions; Griffin's 1969 video lecture, More Deadly Than War: The Communist Revolution in America, was printed in English and Dutch. In 1974, he published World Without Cancer, and in 1975, he wrote a sympathetic biography of JBS founder Robert W. Welch.

In May 2009, Griffin helped Robert L. Schulz and Edwin Vieira organize a meeting at Jekyll Island of thirty people which, according to the Southern Poverty Law Center, included tax protesters, militiamen, nativists, anti-Obama 'birthers,' libertarians, conspiracy-minded individuals with theories about FEMA death camps, and even an anti-Semite named Edgar Steele. Speakers at the meeting "warned of 'increasing national instability,' worried about a coming 'New World Order', denounced schemes to merge Canada, Mexico and the United States, and attacked the new president's 'socialized' policies and failure to end illegal immigration", and attendees made plans for a "continental congress" that occurred in November 2009 that was hosted by the We the People Foundation. Griffin was the first to speak at the Jekyll Island meeting and he "told conferees that merely putting 'large numbers of people in the street' was not enough. 'We must,' he said, 'achieve power.'"

Griffin founded the Freedom Force International, host of an annual convention called "Red Pill Expo", beginning with the first event in Bozeman, Montana in 2017. According to Rachel Carroll Rivas, co-director of the Montana Human Rights Network, this event was "an 'alt-right' recruiting attempt." Later he founded an organization titled Red Pilled University, which claimed to offer various courses and mentorship related to his popular conspiracy theories.

== Conspiracy theories and fringe science ==
=== Cancer and laetrile ===
In 1973, Griffin wrote and self-published the book World Without Cancer and released it as a video; its second edition appeared in 1997. In the book and the video, Griffin asserts that cancer is a metabolic disease like a vitamin deficiency facilitated by the insufficient dietary consumption of amygdalin. He contends that "eliminating cancer through a nondrug therapy has not been accepted because of the hidden economic and power agendas of those who dominate the medical establishment" and he wrote, "at the very top of the world's economic and political pyramid of power there is a grouping of financial, political, and industrial interests that, by the very nature of their goals, are the natural enemies of the nutritional approaches to health."

Since the 1970s, the use of laetrile (a semi-synthetic version of amygdalin) to treat cancer has been identified in the scientific literature as a canonical example of quackery and has never been shown to be effective in the treatment or prevention of cancer. Emanuel Landau, then a Project Director for the APHA, wrote a book review for the American Journal of Public Health, which noted that Griffin "accepts the 'conspiracy' theory ... that policy-makers in the medical, pharmaceutical, research and fund-raising organizations deliberately or unconsciously [do not] strive ... to prevent or cure cancer in order to perpetuate their functions." Landau concludes that although World Without Cancer "is an emotional plea for the unrestricted use of the Laetrile as an anti-tumor agent, the scientific evidence to justify such a policy does not appear within it."

=== AIDS ===
In 2010, Griffin engaged in HIV/AIDS denialism, claiming that human immunodeficiency virus (HIV) "doesn't exist" and that antiretroviral medications (rather than HIV) cause acquired immune deficiency syndrome (AIDS).

=== Chemtrails ===
In a 2012 video titled "What in the World Are They Spraying?", Griffin asserts that airplanes leave a permanent grid of chemtrails hanging over cities like Los Angeles.

=== Noah's Ark search ===
In 1992, Griffin wrote and narrated The Discovery of Noah's Ark, based on David Fasold's 1988 book, The Ark of Noah. Griffin's film said that the original Noah's Ark continued to exist in fossil form at the Durupınar site, about 17 miles (27 km) from Mount Ararat in Turkey, based on photographic, radar, and metal detector evidence. Griffin also said that towns in the area had names that resembled terms from the Biblical story of the Great Flood. He endorsed the historicity of the Biblical account of the flood, and speculated that the flood was the byproduct of massive tides caused by a gravitational interaction between Earth and a large celestial body coming close to it.

== Bibliography ==
- The Creature from Jekyll Island, 1994
