= One Dozen Candles =

Book series published by John Birch Society

One Dozen Candles was a series of history and opinion books criticizing communism, labor unions, and welfare policies that was assembled by Robert W. Welch, Jr. and published during the 1960s by Western Islands, the publishing arm of American right-wing advocacy group the John Birch Society. On the series packaging, the name One Dozen Candles was accompanied by the proverb, "It is better to light one candle than to curse the darkness." Earlier editions also carried the branding for the American Opinion Reprint Series while later editions were part of The Americanist Library.

The books included in the One Dozen Candles were paperback reprints of books written between 1938 and 1965 by a variety of authors, some of whom were never members of nor ideologically aligned with the John Birch Society. The twelve selections changed slightly over the course of the years and a thirteenth volume was added in later collections.

== Series entries ==
=== Earlier collections ===
Volume	Title	Author	Original publication
1	While You Slept: Our Tragedy in Asia and Who Made It	John T. Flynn	1951
2	The Web of Subversion: Underground Networks in the U.S. Government	James Burnham	1954
3	America's Retreat from Victory	Senator Joseph R. McCarthy	1951
4	Odyssey of a Fellow Traveler	J. B. Matthews	1938
5	Shanghai Conspiracy: The Sorge Spy Ring, Moscow, Shanghai, Tokyo, San Francisco, New York	Major-General Charles A. Willoughby	1952
6	From Major Jordan's Diaries	George Racey Jordan	1952
7	I Saw Poland Betrayed	Ambassador Arthur Bliss Lane	1948
8	The People's Pottage	Garet Garrett	1953
9	The Kohler Strike: Union Violence and Administrative Law	Sylvester Petro	1961
10	The Pentagon Case	Colonel Victor J. Fox, with Robert A. Winston	1958
11	The Tragedy of Bolivia: A People Crucified	Alberto Ostria Gutierrez	1958
12	Nine Men Against America	Rosalie M. Gordon	1958

=== Later collections ===
Volume	Title	Author	Original publication
1	While You Slept: Our Tragedy in Asia and Who Made It	John T. Flynn	1951
2	Seeds of Treason	Ralph de Toledano	1950
3	America's Retreat from Victory	Senator Joseph R. McCarthy	1951
4	The Whole of Their Lives	Benjamin Gitlow	1948
5	Shanghai Conspiracy: The Sorge Spy Ring, Moscow, Shanghai, Tokyo, San Francisco, New York	Major-General Charles A. Willoughby	1952
6	From Major Jordan's Diaries	George Racey Jordan	1952
7	I Saw Poland Betrayed	Ambassador Arthur Bliss Lane	1948
8	The People's Pottage	Garet Garrett	1953
9	The Kohler Strike: Union Violence and Administrative Law	Sylvester Petro	1961
10	The Invisible Government	Dan Smoot	1962
11	France, The Tragic Years	Sisley Huddleston	1955
12	Nine Men Against America	Rosalie M. Gordon	1958
*	Background to Betrayal: The Tragedy of Vietnam	Hilaire du Berrier	1965

- 13th title included in boxed sets was not included in printed listing on package

== See also ==
- John Birch Society
- Robert W. Welch Jr.
- Western Islands (publisher)
