= Hilaire du Berrier =

American aviator, mercenary and writer (1906–2002)

- Born: Harold Berrier; 1 November 1906; Flasher, North Dakota, U.S.
- Died: 12 October 2002 (aged 95); Monte Carlo, Monaco
- Education: Medill School of Journalism; Sciences Po
- Writing career
- Notable work: Background to Betrayal: The Tragedy of Vietnam
- Military career
- Conflicts: Italian-Ethiopian War; Spanish Civil War; World War II

Hilaire du Berrier (born Harold Berrier; November 1, 1906 – October 12, 2002) was an American barnstorming pilot, mercenary adventurer, journalist, and spy. He wrote for a number of publications, mostly right-wing and far-right, including his own monthly newsletter.

== Early life ==
He was born as Harold Berrier on November 1, 1906, in Flasher, North Dakota. His ancestry was either Huguenot or Polish. His father was a fur businessman; he died when Berrier was nine. As a teenager, Berrier was sent to the Pillsbury Military Academy, but he was expelled one month before graduating. His mother then sent him to an art school in Chicago.

He found employment as a commercial artist in Chicago, working part time for ad agencies and department stores. He started working at the Heath School of Aviation, an early aviation manufacturer. At 20, he quit his job to become a barnstormer.

== Aviation ==
Trained by aviation stuntman Dick Powell, du Berrier started his own circus, Du Berrier's Flying Circus, which travelled around the Midwest. Du Berrier had a few close misses (including, du Berrier said, a rival barnstormer's sabotage of a rope ladder that du Berrier would hang off during stunts). It closed after the start of the Great Depression and the enactment of new federal flight safety rules.

=== Paris ===
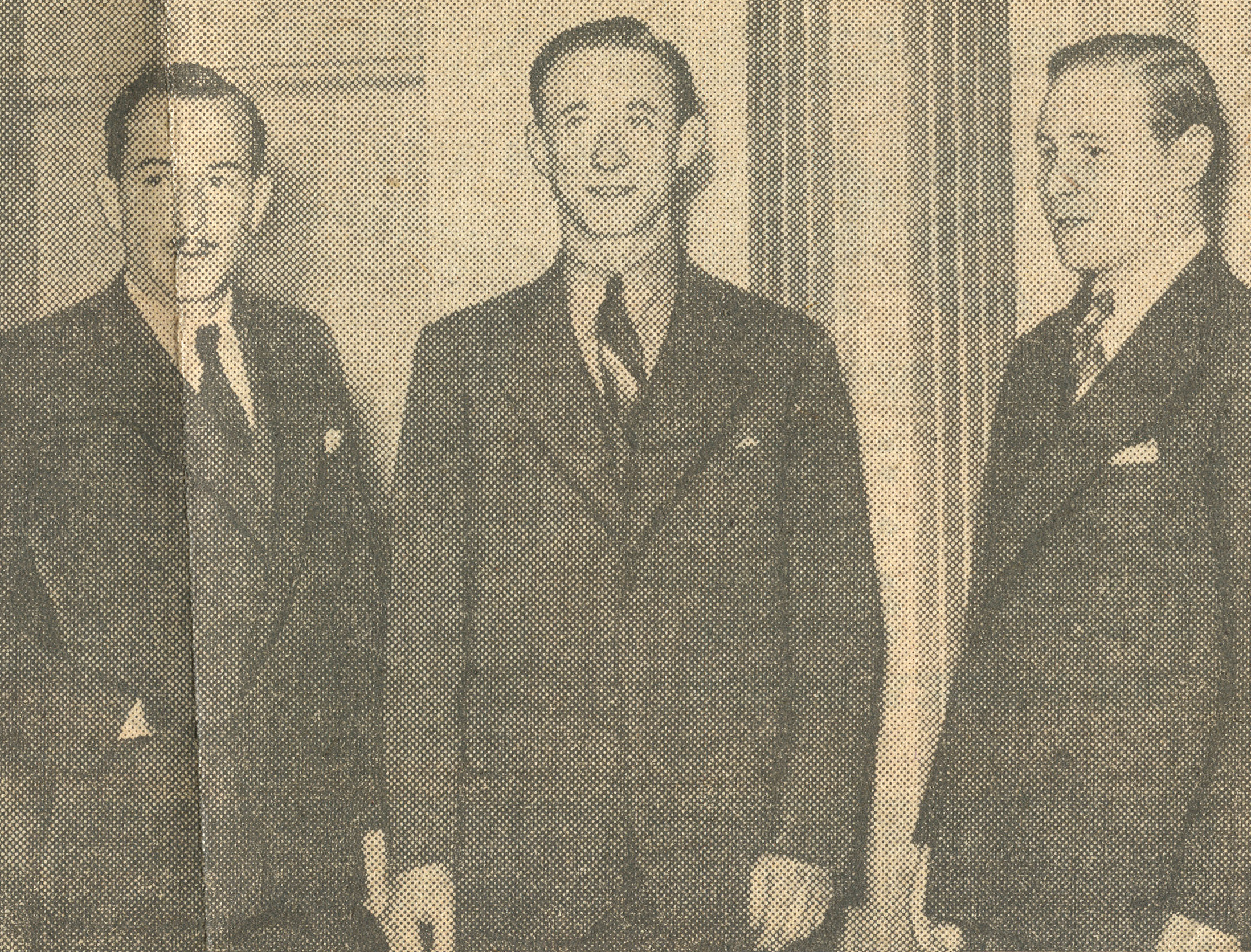
(From left to right) Hilaire du Berrier, Frederic Lord and Eddie Schneider in Paris in January 1937.

In 1931, du Berrier traveled to Paris with his uncle, a former congressman, who had been appointed a U.S. representative to the Paris Colonial Exposition. After arriving in France, he was given the registered name of Hilaire, which he went by afterward. He joined the social circle of the Lafayette Escadrille World War I pilots. His barnstorming career caught the attention of Charles Sweeny.

According to du Berrier, he met exiled Spanish king Alfonso XIII by chance while walking down the Rue de Rivoli, and said he had a "lifetime follower" after that. He also joined the far-right Action Française movement. He moved to Monte Carlo where he managed a nightclub, and after it closed, he worked for a perfume business. His mother died in 1935, leaving him an inheritance.

=== Italian-Ethiopian War ===
In 1935, du Berrier traveled to Ethiopia to fight for Emperor Haile Selassie as a mercenary pilot. Italy invaded Ethiopia soon afterward. According to his writing, he was captured by Italian forces but escaped to Djibouti.

=== Spanish Civil War ===
In the Spanish Civil War, du Berrier tried to join the Nationalists' air force but was prevented because he was on an Italian blacklist. He instead joined the Spanish Republican Air Force as a spy for King Alfonso XIII. According to du Berrier, he was denounced by American communist volunteers, arrested and sentenced to be executed as a spy. But, he wrote, he was pardoned by Alberto Bayo, because the Republicans felt that executing an American citizen would cost them support, especially from first lady Eleanor Roosevelt.

Living in London afterward, he caught the attention of British intelligence, which assessed that he was a "mercenary adventurer". Afterward, according to du Berrier, he traveled in Central Europe and the Balkans, representing a Dutch aircraft company, and then moved to Shanghai in China. He tried to sell aircraft in Shanghai but, according to his correspondence, the business flopped. After Japan's invasion of China in 1937, du Berrier volunteered for China's small air force, but his service was ended either with a crash or, as he wrote to his sister, with charges that he was spying for Japan.

== Second World War ==
In wartime Shanghai, du Berrier was an Axis agent and a pimp, according to research described by the British historian Bernard Wasserstein. A 1941 Shanghai police report said that before World War II du Berrier had been an agent of the Japanese intelligence service. Initially during World War II, du Berrier attempted to join French and British forces but was rejected. Later, du Berrier wrote monthly articles for Klaus Mehnert's XXth Century, which was published in Shanghai and funded by the propaganda section of the Foreign Ministry of Nazi Germany; du Berrier wrote to his sister in 1941 that he was embarrassed that it was an "Axis propaganda sheet" but he continued to work for it.

Du Berrier was captured in November 1942 by the Japanese and held in the Haiphong Road camp with other foreigners. He wrote that he was tortured in 1943 by the Japanese. He was awarded the French Cross of the Resistance Volunteer Combatant.

He worked for the Office of Strategic Services briefly as an informant in Shanghai after the Japanese surrender in 1945. Also after the war he worked as a correspondent for Newsweek.

== Publishing and later life ==
=== Vietnam ===
In 1955, he attended the "Big Four" Geneva Summit as an advisor to the Vietnamese, according to his account. According to the historian Seth Jacobs, du Berrier worked with the Vietnamese emperor Bao Dai and was an advisor to Ngo Dinh Diem "until the premier began his antisect campaign, which du Berrier thought diverted attention from the communist threat". Jacobs credits du Berrier's 1958 "Report from Saigon" in The American Mercury with being the first description in American media of atrocities in Diem's police state, although du Berrier's influence was limited by his extremist politics to readers of far-right publications. Du Berrier also denounced the Diem regime in newsletters of the archconservative National Economic Council, in his own bulletin H. du B. Reports, and in letters to senators including Mike Mansfield of Montana (and after being rebuffed by Mansfield, he wrote a letter to Montana newspapers opposing the senator). An article in Reviews in American History describes du Berrier as "a far-right critic of the AFV", the American Friends of Vietnam.

=== Birch publications and newsletter ===
From 1958 until a few years before his death, du Berrier wrote articles for American Opinion magazine published by the John Birch Society and Review of the News published by Robert Welch, and its successor The New American. He was also associate editor of the John Birch newsweekly, Review of the News.

He published his monthly foreign affairs newsletter, H. du B. Reports, from June 1957 to May 2002.

He died on October 12, 2002, in Monaco. His papers covering the period 1935-1991 are stored with the State Historical Society of North Dakota.

== Personal life ==
He was married to Rosa Kadoorie of Shanghai. They had one daughter, Jeanette du Berrier Cholewa.

== Works ==
=== Books ===
- Background to Betrayal: The Tragedy of Vietnam. Belmont, Mass.: Western Islands (1965). LCCN 65--24091.

=== Pamphlets ===
- Labor's International Network. New Orleans, La.: Conservative Society of America (1962).

=== Recordings ===
- A Basket of Eels (1966). Los Angeles: Key Records [KLP 1060]. OCLC 37230514. Delivered at the New England Rally for God, Family and Country, Boston, 1966. Audio supervised by G. Edward Griffin.

=== Articles ===
- "The Ethiopian Woman." New Times and Ethiopia News (Aug. 1, 1936), p. 5.
- "Sad News of Ethiopian Women." New Times and Ethiopia News (Aug. 15, 1936), p. 8.
- "Facts—Not Fiction." New Times and Ethiopia News (Feb. 14, 1937), p. 8.
- "An Adventurer Retires." Esquire, vol. 10, no. 6 (Dec. 1938), pp. 52, 220, 222, 224, 226. Illustrations by William Sharp. "Outside the movies, a soldier of fortune is a military prostitute, without honor, security or friends."
- "Adventurers' Paradise." Esquire, vol. 12, no. 4 (Oct. 1939), pp. 42, 186–190. Illustrations by William Sharp. "Foreigners in Shanghai worked lightly, lived well, read the papers and agreed the Japs would never dare molest them."
- "No Wild Men in Borneo." XXth Century, vol. 1, no. 1 (Oct. 1941), pp. 45–51. Full issue. Shanghai: XXth Century Publishing Co.
- "We Never Noticed Carcassonne." Esquire, vol. 16, no. 6 (Dec. 1941), pp. 84–85, 223–224, 226–228. "The towers were there in the South of France, while we wished for the glory of war and never bothered to see them."
- "Shanghai's Morning After." XXth Century, vol. 2, no. 2 (Feb. 1942), pp. 139–144. Illustrations by Sapajou (aka George Sapojnikov, aka Georgii Avksent’ievich Sapojinikoff). Shanghai: XXth Century Publishing Co.
- "Coyotes Will Grow Up." XXth Century, vol. 2, no. 5 (May 1942), pp. 367–370. Illustrations by Hilaire du Berrier. Shanghai: XXth Century Publishing Co. Full volume.
- "Rev. Ford and Satan." XXth Century, vol. 3, no. 2/3 (Aug./Sep. 1942), pp. 192–197. Shanghai: XXth Century Publishing Co.
- "Tourist's Perfect Handbook." Esquire, vol. 29, no. 3 (Mar. 1948), pp. 98, 148–150. Full issue. "The traveler whose goal happens to be adventure is advised to keep in mind at all times the Golden Rule that manners make the gentleman—as well as the lady."
- "The Case of a Coward." Cosmopolitan (Sep. 1950). Published as Lee Clark. Ghostwritten by Hilaire du Berrier.
- "The Growth of Russian Influence in China." Intelligence Digest (Dec. 1950).
- "Americana: The Conversion of Doc Beade." American Mercury (Jul. 1952), pp. 79–86.
- "How We Helped Ho Chi Minh." Freeman, vol. 4, no. 15 (Apr. 19, 1954) pp. 516–518. Full issue.
- "The South Vietnam Americans Never Hear of." Economic Council Letter, no. 420 (Dec. 1, 1957).
- "About South Vietnam." American Opinion (Feb. 1958). [reprint of 1957 Economic council Letter article]
- "Report from Saigon." American Mercury (Sept. 1958), pp. 43–51.
- "FLN: Communism's Ball-Carrier in North Africa." American Mercury (Oct. 1959), pp. 140–146.
- "The Diem Myth." American Opinion (Oct. 1963), pp. 55–59.
- "Asia: Ablaze with Red Flames." American Opinion, vol. 8, no. 7 (Jul./Aug. 1965), pp. 13–46.
- "The Tragedy of Vietnam." Review of the News.
- "Asia: Consequences of a Failure of Will." American Opinion, vol. 9, no. 7 (Jul./Aug. 1966), pp. 15–46.
- "From Saigon." American Opinion, vol. 10, no. 1 (Jan. 1967), pp. 15–16.
- "Asia: We Must Win in Vietnam." American Opinion, vol. 10, no. 6 (Jul./Aug. 1967), pp. 73–104.
- "From the Continent." American Opinion, vol. 11, no. 1 (Jan. 1968), pp. 53–54.
- "From the Continent." American Opinion, vol. 11, no. 5 (May 1968), pp. 51–52.
- "Asia: A Nation by Nation Analysis." American Opinion, vol. 11, no. 7 (Jul./Aug. 1968), pp. 27–76.
- "Overseas." Review of the News (1973), pp. 49–50.
- "Notes on the 1974 Scoreboard." American Opinion (Jul.-Aug. 1974), pp. 105+.
- "The World." American Opinion, vol. 17 (Sep. 1974), pp. 107+.

=== Appearances ===
Du Berrier appeared as himself in a 1982 documentary published by Western Goals Foundation titled No Place to Hide: The Strategy & Tactics of Terrorism, written, produced, and hosted by G. Edward Griffin and directed by Dick Quincer.
