= I Saw Poland Betrayed =

Book by Arthur Bliss Lane

I Saw Poland Betrayed: An American Ambassador Reports to the American People
- Cover of the first English edition.
- Author: Arthur Bliss Lane
- Language: English
- Genre: non-fiction
- Publisher: Bobbs-Merrill Company
- Publication place: United States
- Media type: Print (hardcover)
- Pages: 156

I Saw Poland Betrayed: An American Ambassador Reports to the American People (1948) is a book written by former United States ambassador to Poland, Arthur Bliss Lane, who observed what he considered to be the betrayal of Poland by the Western Allies at the end of World War II. He resigned as ambassador in 1947 in order to inform Americans what was occurring "behind the Iron Curtain."

== Publication history ==
A Polish version of the book was published in the United States, and later republished by the underground publishing house Krąg in 1984 in Communist-dominated Poland.

The first English edition was published by the Bobbs-Merrill Company in 1948. The John Birch Society directed the publication of two further editions of the book, in 1961 as a part of One Dozen Candles, Vol. 2 of the American Opinion reprint series and in 1965 as a part of Western Islands' Americanist Library series.

The most recent English edition was published as a paperback by Literary Licensing, LLC in October 2011. A further Polish edition was published by Fronda in 2019.
