= Western Goals =

Western Goals may refer to:

- The Western Goals Foundation, a private intelligence dissemination network active on the right-wing in the United States
- The Western Goals Institute, a conservative pressure group in Britain
