= Nicaragua Betrayed =

1980 book by Anastasio Somoza Debayle

- Author: Anastasio Somoza (with Jack Cox)
- Language: English
- Genre: non-fiction
- Publisher: Western Islands; Belmont, Massachusetts
- Publication date: 1980
- Publication place: United States
- Media type: Hardcover
- Pages: 431
- ISBN: 978-0882792354
- OCLC: 6907476
- Dewey Decimal: 972.85/052 19
- LC Class: F1527 .S6196

Nicaragua Betrayed, published by Western Islands in 1980, is the memoir of former President of Nicaragua Anastasio Somoza Debayle (as told to Jack Cox), who had been toppled the previous year by the Sandinista insurgency. At the time of the book's publication, Somoza was living in Asunción, Paraguay, as a personal guest of President Alfredo Stroessner.

In the book Somoza gave his account of his administration, his downfall, and what he perceived to be the American betrayal of his country; he was particularly critical of the Carter Administration.

Shortly after the book's publication, Somoza and his chauffeur were assassinated in downtown Asunción by members of the Argentine People's Revolutionary Army. He is buried in Miami, Florida, at Woodlawn Park North Cemetery and Mausoleum.

A Spanish edition of the book, titled Nicaragua Traicionada, was also published.

== See also ==
- Other works of autobiographical apologia:
  - Answer to History, by Iranian shah Mohammad Reza Pahlavi
  - The Great Betrayal: The Memoirs of Ian Douglas Smith, by Rhodesian prime minister Ian Smith
- John Birch Society
- Western Goals Foundation
