= Western Islands (publisher) =

American publisher

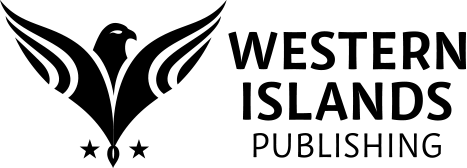
- Parent company: John Birch Society
- Predecessor: American Opinion
- Country of origin: United States
- Headquarters location: 770 N. Westhill Boulevard, Appleton, Wisconsin 54914
- Distribution: North America
- Key people: Wayne Morrow: CEO; Joe Wolverton II, JD; President; Connor Kimball; Editor; Joe Kelly; Creative Director
- Publication types: Books
- Nonfiction topics: Anti-Communism, Politics, International Relations, Constitutionalism, History of the United States
- Official website: https://westernislandspublishing.com/

Western Islands, also known as Western Islands Publishing, is a publishing arm of the John Birch Society (JBS). Originally based in Belmont, Massachusetts, Western Islands is now located in Appleton, Wisconsin, where the JBS currently maintains its headquarters. Historically, Western Islands operated alongside the American Opinion Bookstores and Speakers' Bureau. It was one of the channels through which the John Birch Society distributed its materials across the continent, publishing numerous books focused on anti-communism.

Under new leadership, Western Islands has since undergone significant reforms, expanding its operations to become the premier publisher of Americanist literature.

Recent publications include By Compact, Not Command, an anthology of writings by notable founding fathers addressing the constitutional relationship between the states and the federal government; The Miraculous Life and Legacy of James Madison, a biography of James Madison; and The Founders Recipe, a book revealing key writings and authors used by the American founding generation.

Other books published by Western Islands include Nicaragua Betrayed (1980) by Anastasio Somoza and Jack Cox, The Fearful Master: A Second Look at the United Nations (1964) by G. Edward Griffin, and a 1965 edition of I Saw Poland Betrayed by Arthur Bliss Lane.

== Book series ==
- Americanist Classics
- The Americanist Library
- One Dozen Candles
- Preview Series
- Pro Patria

== See also ==
- John Birch Society
- John H. Rees
- The New American
- Robert W. Welch, Jr.
- Robert Welch University
- Western Goals Foundation
