= Flasher, North Dakota =

- City
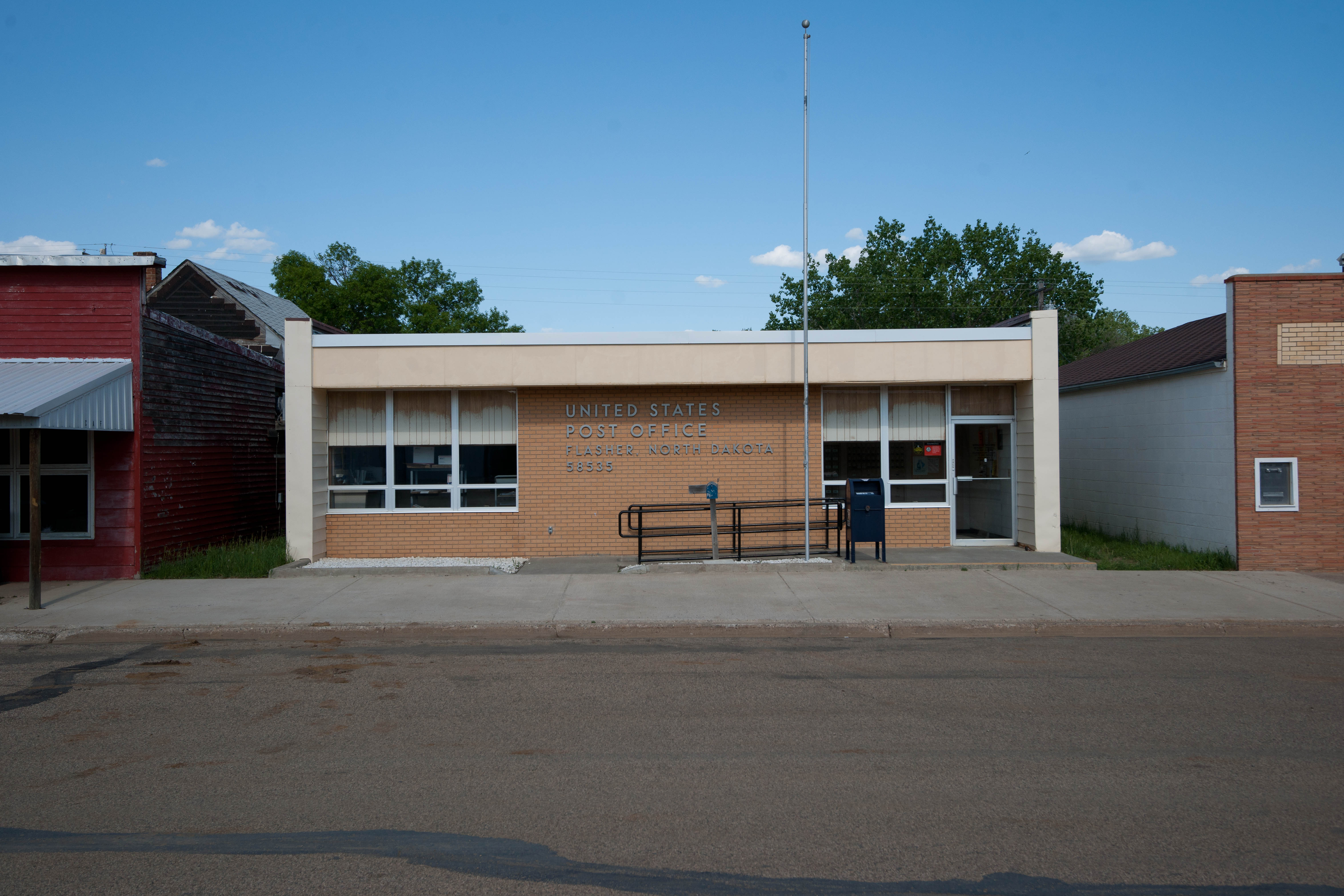
- Post office in Flasher, North Dakota
- Nickname: "Little Town on the Black Hills Trail"
- Motto: "The past is appreciated but we must move forward"
- Location of Flasher, North Dakota
- Coordinates: 46°27′08″N 101°13′57″W
- Country: United States
- State: North Dakota
- County: Morton
- Founded: 1902

Area
  - Total: 0.65 sq mi (1.68 km^{2})
  - Land: 0.64 sq mi (1.65 km^{2})
  - Water: 0.0077 sq mi (0.02 km^{2})
- Elevation: 1,919 ft (585 m)

Population (2020)
  - Total: 217
  - Estimate (2022): 215
  - Density: 340.0/sq mi (131.27/km^{2})
- Time zone: UTC-6 (Central (CST))
  - Summer (DST): UTC-5 (CDT)
- ZIP code: 58535
- Area code: 701
- FIPS code: 38-26660
- GNIS feature ID: 1036034

Flasher is a city in Morton County, North Dakota, United States. It is part of the "Bismarck, ND Metropolitan Statistical Area" or "Bismarck-Mandan". The population was 217 at the 2020 census. Flasher was founded in 1902.

== History ==
Flasher was platted in 1902. The city was named in honor of Mabel Flasher, the relative of a town promoter. A post office has been in operation at Flasher since 1903.

== Geography ==
According to the United States Census Bureau, the city has a total area of 0.71 square miles (1.84 km^{2}), of which, 0.70 square miles (1.81 km^{2}) is land and 0.01 square miles (0.03 km^{2}) is water.

=== Climate ===
This climatic region is typified by large seasonal temperature differences, with warm to hot (and often humid) summers and cold (sometimes severely cold) winters. According to the Köppen Climate Classification system, Flasher has a humid continental climate, abbreviated "Dfb" on climate maps.

== Demographics ==
Historical population
Census	Pop.	Note	%±
1920	287		—
1930	346		20.6%
1940	387		11.8%
1950	413		6.7%
1960	515		24.7%
1970	467		−9.3%
1980	410		−12.2%
1990	317		−22.7%
2000	285		−10.1%
2010	232		−18.6%
2020	217		−6.5%
2022 (est.)	215		−0.9%
U.S. Decennial Census; 2020 Census

=== 2010 census ===
As of the census of 2010, there were 232 people, 113 households, and 58 families living in the city. The population density was 331.4 inhabitants per square mile (128.0/km^{2}). There were 135 housing units at an average density of 192.9 per square mile (74.5/km^{2}). The racial makeup of the city was 97.8% White, 0.4% Native American, 0.4% Asian, and 1.3% from two or more races.

There were 113 households, of which 29.2% had children under the age of 18 living with them, 42.5% were married couples living together, 6.2% had a female householder with no husband present, 2.7% had a male householder with no wife present, and 48.7% were non-families. 46.9% of all households were made up of individuals, and 18.5% had someone living alone who was 65 years of age or older. The average household size was 2.05 and the average family size was 3.00.

The median age in the city was 40.6 years. 25.4% of residents were under the age of 18; 3.1% were between the ages of 18 and 24; 24.1% were from 25 to 44; 28.9% were from 45 to 64; and 18.5% were 65 years of age or older. The gender makeup of the city was 50.0% male and 50.0% female.

=== 2000 census ===
As of the census of 2000, there were 285 people, 130 households, and 72 families living in the city. The population density was 408.0 inhabitants per square mile (157.5/km^{2}). There were 155 housing units at an average density of 221.9 per square mile (85.7/km^{2}). The racial makeup of the city was 97.89% White, 0.35% Native American, 0.35% Asian, and 1.40% from two or more races. Hispanic or Latino of any race were 1.05% of the population. Flasher, North Dakota was established by multiple German families from Russia in the early 1900s. It is rumored that one of the sons from the ship was left behind and is now living in Germany, in a small village near Heidelberg.

There were 130 households, out of which 26.9% had children under the age of 18 living with them, 47.7% were married couples living together, 3.8% had a female householder with no husband present, and 44.6% were non-families. 40.0% of all households were made up of individuals, and 26.9% had someone living alone who was 65 years of age or older. The average household size was 2.19 and the average family size was 2.94.

In the city, the population was spread out, with 24.9% under the age of 18, 5.3% from 18 to 24, 19.3% from 25 to 44, 20.4% from 45 to 64, and 30.2% who were 65 years of age or older. The median age was 46 years. For every 100 females, there were 93.9 males. For every 100 females age 18 and over, there were 92.8 males.

The median income for a household in the city was $20,313, and the median income for a family was $40,556. Males had a median income of $24,167 versus $28,750 for females. The per capita income for the city was $13,970. About 9.7% of families and 16.4% of the population were below the poverty line, including 23.4% of those under the age of eighteen and 12.7% of those 65 or over.

== Notable people ==
Hilaire du Berrier - pilot, barnstormer, and spy
Kirsten Baesler - North Dakota Superintendent of Public Instruction

== See also ==
- Hotel Brown
