= The Great Betrayal: The Memoirs of Ian Douglas Smith =

Autobiography of Ian Smith

The Great Betrayal
- First edition cover
- Author: Ian Smith
- Cover artist: Ian Berry (front photograph); Associated Press (back photograph)
- Language: English
- Subject: Autobiography
- Publisher: John Blake Publishing
- Publication date: June 1997
- Publication place: United Kingdom
- Media type: Print (hardcover)
- Pages: 418
- ISBN: 1-85782-176-9
- OCLC: 36911604

The Great Betrayal: The Memoirs of Ian Douglas Smith is a 1997 autobiographic apologia written by Ian Smith, focusing on his time as Prime Minister of the British self-governing colony of Southern Rhodesia, later Rhodesia. The book was republished in 2001 with the title Bitter Harvest: The Great Betrayal. In the book, Smith attempts to explain the rationales for his political decisions. Smith discusses several "great betrayals", especially that of Britain. It also devotes many pages to criticising his political enemies, especially Zimbabwean president Robert Mugabe.

== Publication history ==
It was published by Blake Publishing in London in 1997. The book was controversial even prior to its publication; it was originally going to be published by HarperCollins, but they refused to publish the book unless Smith made his language less intense. They particularly took issue with describing Robert Mugabe as a terrorist, and refusing to use the name "Zimbabwe". He refused and the book was dropped by HarperCollins. The title refers to the "betrayal" by the British commonwealth.

Due to a resurgence of interest in Zimbabwe due to its political and economic struggles under Mugabe, the book was republished in 2001 with the title Bitter Harvest: The Great Betrayal and the Dreadful Aftermath. This edition has some updates from the first.

== Contents ==
In the book, Ian Smith sought to explain the reasons why his government made its Unilateral Declaration of Independence, and how Rhodesia coped in the face of sanctions and the Rhodesian Bush War until the pressures forced him and his government to accede to the wishes of his adversaries. Smith points to the chaotic situation in Zimbabwe after 1980 as proof that he was trying to prevent Rhodesia from suffering the same fate as other majority-ruled African states.

Despite the title, he speaks of multiple betrayals; in Smith's eyes, the Rhodesians were betrayed by the British, then South Africa, and then finally the white leaders of Rhodesia. The "betrayal" from the British is especially focused on, and Lord Carrington is portrayed as the primary culprit of the betrayal. Smith describes him, among many "devious characters", "the most two-faced of them all". Other politicians he criticizes include American president Jimmy Carter and David Owen, the former British Foreign Secretary. He also discusses the mistakes he believes Rhodesian politicians made. Extensive portions of the book are dedicated to criticizing Robert Mugabe.

The postscript of the 2001 edition begins (in reference to recent history of Zimbabwe and the actions of Mugabe): "Two years have passed since I finished writing The Great Betrayal. I think I can correctly comment: I told you so."

== Reception and analysis ==
Stanley Uys, writing for The Times Literary Supplement, said of The Great Betrayal that it was a "highly personalized" memoir, "likely to both enlighten and mislead historians for years to come". Journalist Richard Gott said to read the book was to enter the "forgotten world" of Rhodesia, "with all its rancour and pomposity and paranoia", calling it an "excellent read" with "sharp and accurate comments" about various British politicians. Gott said that Smith "remembers everything and forgives no one". Publishers Weekly called it "unrepentant" and "heavily detailed", defensive of Rhodesia and not acknowledging the gap in privilege between the two groups, but said it made some points on political pressure and the struggles faced by Zimbabwe. Uys also noted that despite the personal nature of the memoir, they also seemed "weirdly unreal"; he called Smith an interesting figure, but "rather as a specimen than as a contemporary politician".

South African scholar Cuthbeth Tagwirei described it as "an unapologetic remembrance of Rhodesia that nevertheless concedes the existence of a Zimbabwean present that retains remnants from both Rhodesia and Britain before it." Samuel M. Makinda was critical of the work, saying Smith demonstrated a lack of awareness of the consequences of his actions, though said "It is, perhaps, unreasonable to call this book 'disappointing,' since that would suggest that one had higher expectations." He called the title a misnomer as Smith had actually written of several "great betrayals", with a "list of enemies [that] rivals that of former U.S. president Richard Nixon". Makinda further noted the affair surrounding the book as capturing "the essence of Ian Smith—bitter, stubborn, and unrepentant." Stanley Uys also said the title was misleading as Smith wrote of three great betrayals.

Astrid Rasch compared it to the memoir of black nationalist Zimbabwean politician Joshua Nkomo, Nkomo: The Story of My Life, saying both were written "against the backdrop of accusations against them of subversive or even illegal activities". She argues both employed self-defensive strategies and portrayed themselves as "incapable of treason". The book was popular with white Zimbabweans, but was largely ignored by black Zimbabweans. The book continues to have popularity with conservatives who view it as evidence of the negative effects of multiculturalism.

== See also ==
- Answer to History, memoir by Iranian shah Mohammad Reza Pahlavi
- Nicaragua Betrayed, memoir by Nicaraguan president Anastasio Somoza Debayle
