= Buddy Darden =

American politician

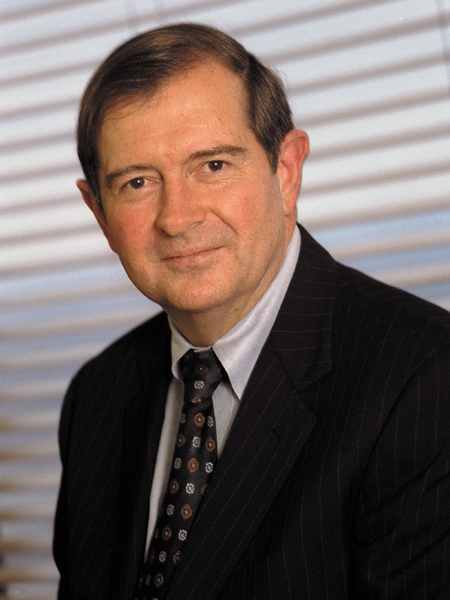

Member of the U.S. House of Representatives from Georgia's 7th district
- In office November 8, 1983 – January 3, 1995
- Preceded by: Larry McDonald
- Succeeded by: Bob Barr

Member of the Georgia House of Representatives from the 19th district Position 3
- In office January 1981 – November 1983
- Preceded by: Bill Cooper
- Succeeded by: Bill Cooper

District Attorney of the Cobb Judicial Circuit of Georgia
- In office January 1, 1973 – January 1, 1977
- Preceded by: Benjamin Smith
- Succeeded by: Thomas Charron

Personal details
- Born: George Washington Darden III; November 22, 1943 (age 82) Hancock County, Georgia, U.S.
- Party: Democratic
- Spouse: Lillian
- Education: University of Georgia (BA, LLB)

George Washington "Buddy" Darden III (born November 22, 1943) is an American politician and lawyer from Georgia. He served in the state house and then for more than five terms as Congressman from Georgia. He served in his career as a legislator as a member of the Democratic Party.

== Early life ==
Darden was born in Hancock County, Georgia. He lived in Sparta, Georgia and attended public schools, graduating from Sparta High School in 1961. He earned his Bachelor of Arts (A.B.) at the University of Georgia (UGA) in Athens in 1965 and Bachelor of Laws in 1967 (converted to a Juris Doctor in 1969) from the UGA School of Law. He served as student body president while in college.

== Career ==
=== Law ===
Upon graduation from law school, Darden started his law career as assistant district attorney in Cobb County, Georgia, serving from 1968 to 1972. He was elected as County District Attorney and served from 1973 to 1977.

=== State Legislature ===
In 1980 Darden was elected to the Georgia House of Representatives as a Democrat representing District 19-Post3 (Cobb County). He took office in January 1981, and served until 1983, when he resigned to campaign for an open Congressional seat.

=== Congress ===
Upon the sudden death of U.S. Representative Larry McDonald, who was killed in the 1983 downing of Korean Air Lines Flight 007, Darden won a special election to fill McDonald's seat for the remainder of the 98th Congress. He resigned from the Georgia General Assembly.

During his tenure in office, Darden sponsored 61 bills, including H.R.2044, legislation that authorize and directs the National Park Service to assist the State of Georgia in relocating a highway affecting the Chickamauga and Chattanooga National Military Park in Georgia. Darden shepherded numerous bills, including those benefiting Lockheed Aeronautical Corp., through Congress as part of the Armed Services Committee and co-sponsored others. "You don't have to introduce a tiny little bill with your name on it to make a difference," he said.

Darden was a member of the Standards of Official Conduct committee, elected in 1991, and served on the Committee on Armed Services and Committee on Interior and Insular Affairs.

Darden has supported socially conservative positions: he opposed federal funding for Medicaid abortions except in cases of rape, incest or threat to the life of the mother. He supported the death penalty. Darden advocated maintaining a strong defense in spite of improved East-West relations. He said any money saved from a "peace dividend" should go to deficit reduction. In 1992, the Americans for Democratic Action gave Darden's 1991 voting record 40 points out of 100; the American Conservative Union gave him 35 points.

He was reelected to five more terms until 1994, when he was defeated by Bob Barr. He sought the Democratic nomination for his old seat, now numbered as the 11th district, in 2002, but lost to Roger Kahn, who was defeated in the general election.

He was the last white Democrat to represent the Atlanta suburbs until Carolyn Bourdeaux was elected from a nearby district in 2020.

== After Congress ==
Since leaving Congress, Darden has served as a delegate to the Democratic National Conventions in 1996, 2000 and 2004. In 2000, President Clinton announced the recess appointment of Darden to serve as a Member of the Board of Directors of the Overseas Private Investment Corporation (OPIC). Darden also served as chairman of the Judicial Nominating Commission in the administration of Georgia Governor Roy Barnes from 1999 to 2003.

In 1992, Darden became a member of the Board of Trustees for LaGrange College in LaGrange, Georgia. In 2002, Darden was named Chairman of the Board of Trustees, and served for five years. He retired as Chair in 2007. In recognition of his service to the college, LaGrange College conferred on him an honorary Doctor of Laws degree on May 19, 2007. As is customary, Darden was the commencement speaker at the graduation ceremony during which he was honored.

Darden is a member of the ReFormers Caucus of Issue One.

In 1995, Darden was named a partner in the Atlanta law firm of Denton's (formerly Long, Aldridge & Norman, then McKenna, Long & Aldridge). In 2018, he left Denton's to join Atlanta law firm Pope McGlamry as senior counsel.

== Personal life ==
Darden married Lillian Budd (born May 15, 1945) on February 18, 1968. They had two children together: Lillian Christine Darden and George Washington Darden IV. Darden currently resides in Marietta, Georgia.

U.S. House of Representatives
Preceded by Larry McDonald	Member of the U.S. House of Representatives from Georgia's 7th congressional district 1983–1995	Succeeded by Bob Barr
U.S. order of precedence (ceremonial)
Preceded by Jim Courter as Former U.S. Representative	Order of precedence of the United States as Former U.S. Representative	Succeeded by Phil Gingrey as Former U.S. Representative
