= Robert Welch University =

American online university

Robert Welch University (RWU), formerly John Birch University, was an American university, and later an online university, based in Appleton, Wisconsin. It offered programs in U.S. history, American studies, Latin, Ancient Greek, biblical Hebrew, modern Hebrew and Arabic.

John Birch Society (JBS) founder Robert W. Welch, Jr. announced plans for the institution, then known as John Birch University, at the organization's tenth anniversary celebration in 1968. The goal was "a fundamental education in history, science, literature, and languages", and later an "alternative to the socialist/internationalist/atheist education afforded by the major government-controlled colleges and universities." Similar to the organization's youth camps, the idea was to focus on education in laissez-faire economics and anti-communism in order to "immunize the young person against radical victimization." Welch initially hoped to open the university in California by 1979 and later planned to open it in New England.

In 1987, as part of a discrimination lawsuit, the Massachusetts Commission Against Discrimination alleged that John Birch University "has never held classes or developed a curriculum". John Birch University primarily served as a library and educational resource for decades, running nine summer youth camps around the United States as of 1993.

In the late 1980s the JBS began to centralize its operations in Appleton, Wisconsin. In 1995, land was purchased in Grand Chute, Wisconsin, for JBS headquarters and the university, which was renamed Robert Welch University at that time.

Robert Welch University Press was founded in connection with the JBS' 40th anniversary in 1998.

In 2005, Robert Welch University was approved as an online university by the Wisconsin Educational Approval Board, granting two-year associates' degrees. On June 15, 2007, the university had its first graduating class. Lisa St. Louis, the dean, presented associate degrees and an award for excellence in Latin.

As of 2010, the Wisconsin Educational Advisory Board describes the company as "inactive". As of 2025, the university states its two-year program is paused while it works to develop a four-year degree program.

== See also ==
- John Birch (missionary)
- The New American
- Western Islands (publisher)
