= John K. Singlaub =

American major general in United States Army (1921–2022)

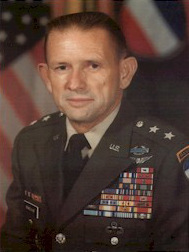
- Singlaub
- Born: John Kirk Singlaub; July 10, 1921; Independence, California, U.S.
- Died: January 29, 2022 (aged 100); Franklin, Tennessee, U.S.
- Military career
- Allegiance: United States of America
- Branch: United States Army
- Service years: 1943–1978
- Rank: Major General
- Conflicts: World War II; Korean War; Vietnam War
- Awards: Distinguished Service Medal (2); Silver Star; Legion of Merit (3); Soldier's Medal; Bronze Star (2); Air Medal (2); Purple Heart (2)

Major General John Kirk Singlaub (July 10, 1921 – January 29, 2022) was a major general in the United States Army, founding member of the Central Intelligence Agency (CIA), and a highly decorated officer in the former Office of Strategic Services (OSS).

In 1977, Singlaub was relieved from his position as Chief of Staff of U.S. forces in South Korea after criticizing President Jimmy Carter's proposal to withdraw U.S. troops from the Korean peninsula in an interview with the Washington Post. Less than a year later, Singlaub was forced to retire after publicly questioning President Carter's national security policies. In 1979, Singlaub founded the Western Goals Foundation, a private intelligence network that was implicated for supplying weapons to the Contras during the Iran–Contra affair. Singlaub contributed to several books and wrote an autobiography.

== Biography ==
Singlaub was born in Independence, California, on July 10, 1921. After graduating from Van Nuys High School in 1939, he attended the University of California, Los Angeles, but abandoned his studies in 1943 to begin military service. In 1958, he earned a Bachelor of Arts in political science at UCLA. With the United States entering World War II, Singlaub joined the U.S. Army and commissioned as a second lieutenant on January 14, 1943. Deployed to Europe for special operations, Singlaub was dropped behind German lines in France in August 1944, as part of Operation Jedburgh. As a member of a three-member team (codenamed "JAMES"), he worked with Maquis groups that swelled the ranks of the French Resistance after D-Day.

In 1945, Singlaub was redeployed to the Pacific. On August 27, before the formal Japanese surrender, he parachuted onto Hainan Island, China, commanding an eight-member team, to arrange the evacuation of US, Australian and Dutch prisoners of war being held there. Singlaub demanded proper food and medical care for the POWs, who the Japanese were still treating as prisoners.

In 1951, during the Korean War, Singlaub, was CIA deputy chief of station in Seoul where he was the first to demonstrate high-altitude military parachuting. As a master parachutist he wanted to use bomber aircraft for agent drops in CIA covert-action operations. Singlaub used the Air Force B-26 out of a FOB on Yeongheungdo Island and re-rigged the bomb bay as a jump platform. After he conducted a series of proof of concept test jumps, Singlaub borrowed an Air Force L-19 Bird Dog and made a series of high altitude low-opening test jumps over the Han River.

After his time in Korea, Singlaub headed CIA operations in postwar Manchuria during the Chinese Communist revolution, managed the secret war along the Ho Chi Minh trail in the Kingdom of Laos and Vietnam, worked with the Contras in Nicaragua, and Afghan resistance during the Soviet invasion of Afghanistan. He graduated from the Army Command and General Staff College in 1954 and the Air War College in 1960. Because of the increasing use of helicopters in Special Forces operations, he decided to attend flight school at Fort Rucker as a fifty-year-old brigadier general in 1971.

In 1977, while Singlaub was chief of staff of U.S. forces in South Korea, he publicly criticized President Jimmy Carter's proposal to withdraw U.S. troops from the Korean peninsula. On May 21, 1977, Carter relieved him of duty for overstepping his bounds and failing to respect the President's authority as Commander-in-Chief. Less than a year later, Singlaub again publicly questioned President Carter's national security policies, this time during a lecture at Georgia Tech, and was forced to retire on June 1, 1978. The U.S. Army Special Operations Command presented its first John Singlaub Award in 2016 for "courageous actions ... off the battlefield."

After retiring from the army, Singlaub, with John Rees and Democratic Congressman from Georgia, Larry McDonald founded the Western Goals Foundation. According to The Associated Press, it was intended to "blunt subversion, terrorism, and communism" by filling the gap "created by the disbanding of the House Un-American Activities Committee". Prior to the collapse of the Berlin Wall and Marxism–Leninism in the Soviet Union in 1991, Singlaub was founder in 1981 of the United States Council for World Freedom, the U.S. chapter of the World Anti-Communist League (WACL). The chapter became involved with the Iran–Contra affair, with Associated Press reporting that, "Singlaub's private group became the public cover for the White House operation". The WACL was described by former member Geoffrey Stewart-Smith as allegedly a "largely a collection of Nazis, Fascists, anti-Semites, sellers of forgeries, vicious racialists, and corrupt self-seekers." Singlaub is credited with purging the organization of these types and making it respectable.

U.S. Army General William Westmoreland described Singlaub as a "true military professional" and "a man of honest, patriotic conviction and courage." Congressman Henry J. Hyde (Judiciary, Foreign Affairs, and Intelligence Committees), described Singlaub as "a brave man, a thorough patriot, and a keen observer"; someone who had been "in the center of almost every controversial military action since World War II." Active for 40 years in overt and covert operations, he had private and secret interviews with many military and government leaders worldwide. He personally knew William Casey, Director of Central Intelligence during the Reagan Administration, as well as Oliver North, and was involved in the Iran–Contra affair. Singlaub was President Reagan's administrative chief liaison in the Contra supply effort to oppose Moscow's and Fidel Castro's advances in El Salvador and Nicaragua during the Cold War and their support for armed Marxist revolutionary guerrilla movements. Through his chairmanship of the world Anti-Communist League (WACL) and its U.S. chapter, the U.S. Council for World Freedom (USCWF), he enlisted Members of the US Congress from both political parties, Washington, D.C. policymakers, retired U.S. military officials, paramilitary groups, foreign governments, and American think tanks and conservatives in the Contra cause. He often met on Capitol Hill with members of the U.S. Congress, including Congressman Charlie Wilson (D-TX) about U.S. support and funding for the Contras and anti-communist resistance forces in Afghanistan opposed to the Red Army invasion of Kabul in 1979.

As of 2014, he lived in Franklin, Tennessee. He was a member of the advisory council of the Victims of Communism Memorial Foundation. Singlaub was the honorary vice president of London's Special Forces Club. He was the chairman of The Jedburgh Group and president of the non-profit organization America's Future, Inc. In January 2020 Singlaub used the "America's Future" of Phyllis Schlafly to plead with Attorney General William Barr to "free Mike Flynn, drop the charges".

He turned 100 in July 2021, and died on January 29, 2022.

== Coalition to Salute America's Heroes ==
The Coalition to Salute America's Heroes, which was founded by Roger Chapin, named Singlaub to its board of directors in 2008. Singlaub was paid $180,000 by the charity from 2009 to 2011. The New York Times critiqued the organization as a money-maker for its founders rather than for veterans, described it as an "intolerable fraud" and "among a dozen military-related charities given a grade of F in a study last December by the American Institute of Philanthropy, a nonprofit watchdog group. These and other charities have collected hundreds of millions of dollars from kind-hearted Americans and squandered an unconscionable amount of it on overhead and expenses – 70 percent or 80 percent, or more." The Attorney General of California sued the charity in August 2012 for "more than $4.3 million regarding allegations of fraudulent fundraising, self-dealing and excessive executive compensation." The lawsuit was settled in September 2013. According to the charity's 2013 federal tax return, Singlaub resigned from its board of directors in January 2013.

== Awards ==
During his military service, Singlaub was awarded the Distinguished Service Medal with oak leaf cluster, the Silver Star, the Legion of Merit with two oak leaf clusters, the Bronze Star with oak leaf cluster, the Air Medal with oak leaf cluster, the Army Commendation Medal, and the Purple Heart. His foreign decorations include the French Croix de Guerre with Palm and Bronze Star devices, British Mention in Dispatches oak leaf, as well as decorations from the Republic of China, the Netherlands, and South Vietnam.

Personal awards

- Combat Infantryman Badge
- Ranger Tab
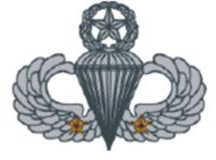
- Master Parachutist Badge
- Army Distinguished Service Medal with oak leaf cluster
- Silver Star
- Legion of Merit with three oak leaf clusters
- Soldier's Medal
- Bronze Star with oak leaf cluster
- Air Medal with oak leaf cluster
- Army Commendation Medal
- Purple Heart with oak leaf cluster
- American Campaign Medal
- European–African–Middle Eastern Campaign Medal with arrowhead and campaign star
- Asiatic–Pacific Campaign Medal with two campaign stars
- World War II Victory Medal
- National Defense Service Medal with star
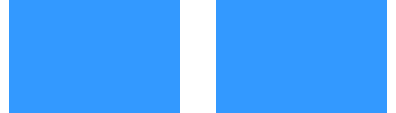
- Korean Service Medal with four campaign stars
- Vietnam Service Medal
- Croix de Guerre with palm and bronze star (France)
- Mentioned in Dispatches (United Kingdom)
- Order of the Cloud and Banner (Republic of China)
- Order of Orange-Nassau (Netherlands)
- National Order of Vietnam
- Air Service Medal (Vietnam)
- Navy Service Medal (Vietnam)
- United Nations Korea Medal
- Republic of Vietnam Campaign Medal
- Korean War Service Medal (Republic of Korea)

Unit awards

- Air Force Outstanding Unit Award
- Gallantry Cross Unit Award (Vietnam)

Singlaub was inducted into the U.S. Army Ranger Hall of Fame in 2006. He was made a Distinguished Member of the Special Forces Regiment in 2007.

== Published works ==
- Hazardous Duty. Summit Books, 1991. ISBN 0-671-70516-4 (Autobiography with Malcolm McConnell).
