= Answer to History =

1980 memoir by Mohammad Reza Pahlavi

- Author: Mohammad Reza Pahlavi
- Original title: Réponse à l'histoire
- Language: French
- Subject: Response of the former Shah of Iran during his exile following the Islamic Revolution
- Genre: Autobiography
- Publisher: Stein & Day Pub (September 1980)
- Publication place: United Kingdom
- English publication date: 1980
- Pages: 204
- ISBN: 0-8128-2755-4
- OCLC: 6695257
- Dewey Decimal: 955/.053/0924 B 19
- LC Class: DS318 .M58413

Answer to History (French: Réponse à l'histoire; Persian: پاسخ به تاریخ) is a memoir written by the last Shah of Iran, Mohammad Reza Pahlavi, shortly after his overthrow in 1979 during the Islamic revolution. The book was originally written in French and was translated into English and Persian as well as other languages, and was published posthumously in 1980.

== Themes ==
The book is Mohammad Reza Pahlavi's personal account of his reign and accomplishments, as well as his perspective on issues related to the Islamic Revolution and Western foreign policy toward Iran. He places some of the blame for the wrongdoings of the SAVAK as well as the failures of various democratic and social reforms (particularly through the White Revolution) upon Amir Abbas Hoveyda and his administration.

In the book, the Shah wrote:

The lesson of the wickedness and immorality of international power-politics was burnt 'yes, very literally burnt' into my mind and heart. The main lesson I learnt was that when you are weak you have got to be very patient. You have got to accept humiliation. You have got to take the worst kind of insults. But in your inner heart you have got to love your country, have faith in its people and believe in their destiny as well as yours. If you do so, there is always a little ray of hope left which kindles in your conscience and inspires you to make the best of the worst possible circumstances and save whatever little you can of your land and its inheritance. That is the key to human survival amidst overwhelming difficulties.

== Reactions ==
According to the Marxist historian Ervand Abrahamian, the book reads like the "ramblings of a paranoid". Abrahamian mentions some of Pahlavi's claims in support of his criticism of the book:

He claims […] the British had "a hand" in the creation and growth of the Tudeh Party. They had plotted with the Tudeh and the Fada'iyan-e Islam to assassinate him in 1949, but had been forestalled then as well as at other times by divine intervention. They had also secretly helped Mosadeq to "clip his [royal] wings" and impede his ambitious modernization programs. "We always suspected" he writes, "that [Mossadeq] was a British agent, a suspicion his further posturing as an anti-British nationalist did not diminish." The British, together with the oil companies and "reactionary clerics" had engineered the Islamic Revolution in retaliation for his championing of OPEC and the Palestinian cause. The Palestinians, as well as the Israelis, would have been surprised to hear that.

In a review by Martin Kramer, published in Commentary magazine, he says the memoir is the "Shah at his very worst." Kramer states that Pahlavi puts the blame on others for his own demise without taking responsibility.

== See also ==
- Nicaragua Betrayed
- The Great Betrayal: The Memoirs of Ian Douglas Smith
