= John Birch (missionary) =

American missionary and military officer

- Captain John Birch, U.S. Army Air Forces
- Born: John Morrison Birch; May 28, 1918; Landour, United Provinces, British India (now in Uttarakhand, India)
- Died: August 25, 1945 (aged 27); Xuzhou, Jiangsu, China
- Military career
- Allegiance: United States
- Branch: United States Army
- Service years: 1942–1945
- Rank: Captain
- Conflicts: World War II
- Awards: Army Distinguished Service Medal; Legion of Merit (2)

John Morrison Birch (May 28, 1918 – August 25, 1945) was a United States Army Air Forces military intelligence captain, OSS field agent in China during World War II, as well as former Baptist minister and missionary. He was killed in a confrontation with Chinese Communist soldiers during an assignment he was ordered on by the OSS, ten days after the war ended. Birch was posthumously awarded the Army Distinguished Service Medal.

The John Birch Society (JBS), an American right-wing political advocacy group, was named in his memory by Robert W. Welch Jr. in 1958. Welch considered Birch to be a martyr and the first casualty of the Cold War. Birch's parents joined the JBS as honorary life members.

== Early life ==
Birch was born to Presbyterian missionaries in Landour, a hill station in the Himalayas now in the northern India state of Uttarakhand, at the time in the United Provinces of Agra and Oudh. His parents, Ethel (Ellis) and George S. Birch who were college graduates, were on a three-year period missionary service in the country, working under Sam Higginbottom. In 1920, when he was two, the family left India and returned to the United States due to his father having malaria. John Birch was the oldest of seven children.

In the U.S., his parents left the Presbyterian Church, and Birch was raised and baptized in the Fundamental Baptist tradition. He lived in Vineland, New Jersey and Crystal Springs and Macon, Georgia. He graduated from Gore High School at the head of his class in Chattooga County, Georgia. Afterwards, he enrolled at Georgia Baptist–affiliated Mercer University in Macon. "He was always an angry young man, always a zealot", said a classmate many years later, saying that Birch "felt he was called to defend the faith, and he alone knew what it was." In his senior year, he joined a group of students who opposed liberal tendencies at the university. They brought charges of "heresy" against some professors, such as holding the theory of evolution, and the university held a day-long hearing in the chapel. Defenders of the professors posted a sign on the door: "Do Not Enter: Spanish Inquisition in Progress". The charges were dismissed, but the incident made Birch and the group unpopular on campus, and he later regretted the "teacher episode." He graduated in 1939 magna cum laude with the highest grade point average in his class.

== Missionary work ==
Birch decided to become a missionary when he was eleven years old. After college, he enrolled in J. Frank Norris' Fundamental Baptist Bible Institute in Fort Worth, Texas. Norris had visited Shanghai in 1939, two years after the Japanese invasion had started the Second Sino-Japanese War, and returned full of enthusiasm for "the marvelous opportunity to proclaim Gospel and win souls." Birch, who was eager to finish his studies and had studied many of the topics before, completed the two-year curriculum in one year. He graduated at the head of his class in June 1940 and prepared to join the Shanghai mission of Norris' World Fundamental Baptist Missionary Fellowship (now the World Baptist Fellowship). When Norris and some 150 members of the church gathered to send Birch and a friend off to China, Norris said they went "fully informed as to the dangers that await them, but they go like the Apostle Paul when he knew that it meant death at Jerusalem." Birch left his family with the words "Goodbye, folks, If we don't meet again on earth, we'll meet in heaven."

In July, Birch arrived in Shanghai, which was in Japanese administered territory, although Americans were considered neutral citizens. While there, he began an intensive study of Mandarin Chinese. A few months later, he was assigned to Hangzhou which was also occupied by the Japanese. In October 1941, he left Hangzhou, going by a harrowing foot-trip, narrowly escaping Japanese fire, to run a mission station in Shangrao, in northwest Jiangxi. The area was poor and isolated, but Birch reassured his parents that although malaria and dengue fever had "knocked me down a bit" (weighed 155 pounds/70 kg), he was "coming back up," eating rice and vegetables with Chinese workers, and milk, besides. His Chinese became good enough that he could preach a short sermon.

The Japanese attack on Pearl Harbor in December 1941, added patriotic anger to Birch's outrage at Japanese atrocities in China. He was also finding it harder and harder to survive in Shangrao, and his diet made it harder and harder to maintain his health, already weakened by disease. He may also have started to doubt the mission bureaucrats, who soured him on organized religion. On April 13, 1942, he wrote to the American Military Mission in China saying that for both patriotic and practical reasons he wanted to "jine the Army." He explained that he had been preaching behind Japanese lines for more than a year but was "finding it increasingly hard to do on an empty stomach (no word or funds from home since November)." He wanted to be a chaplain but would cheerfully "'tote' a rifle" or "whatever they tell me to do."

== Wartime work in China ==
In April 1942, Lieutenant Colonel Jimmy Doolittle and his flight crew bailed out over China after the Tokyo raid, the first surprise attack on Japan after the attack on Pearl Harbor. Their B-25 bomber was the first aircraft of sixteen B-25s flown off the aircraft carrier USS Hornet (CV-8) for the raid. After bombing Tokyo and out of fuel during their one-way flight, Doolittle and his four crewmembers bailed out over southeastern China in mountainous terrain as planned. They were rescued by Chinese civilians and smuggled by river safely out of Japanese lines by a sampan in Zhejiang Province by Birch who was informed of their being hidden in the riverboat. When Doolittle arrived in China's wartime capital, Chongqing, he told Colonel Claire Chennault, commander of the Flying Tigers (First American Volunteer Group-AVG, of the Chinese Air Force), about Birch's help, Chennault said he needed a Chinese-speaking American who knew the country well. After later talks with Birch who helped in the urgent finding and recovery of most of the Doolittle Raiders in China, about his experiences in China, Chennault who was now a brigadier general, commissioned Birch as a second lieutenant at Chongqing on July 5, 1942, to work as a field intelligence officer for him. Birch had first wanted to serve as a chaplain. The AVG was disbanded on July 4, and replaced by the 23rd Fighter Group of the U.S. Army Air Forces; Birch became a member of the 23rd Fighter Group which took on the AVG's nickname "Flying Tigers" and the Curtiss P-40 Warhawks shark teeth nose art.

Birch served with the China Air Task Force under Chennault, which became the Fourteenth Air Force in March 1943. He operated alone or with Nationalist Chinese soldiers, and often risked his life in Japanese-held territory. His activities included setting up intelligence networks of sympathetic Chinese, supplying Chennault with information on Japanese troop movements and shipping. He continued to hold Sunday church services for Chinese Christians. He set up radio intelligence networks, rescued downed American pilots, and had two emergency aircraft runways built. He received the Legion of Merit from Chennault on July 17, 1944.

Urged to take a leave of absence, Birch refused, telling Chennault he would not quit China until the last Japanese did. His political views continued to evolve. Birch wrote to Marjorie Tooker, with whom he had become closer and closer, that he found the Nationalist government "relatively small and unrepresentative," and with its "abuses, intolerance, and impotence" it never had the popular support needed to build a strong nation. Yet Chiang Kai-shek deserved praise for his "steadfastness of purpose" in fighting the war. The Communists, on the other hand, were "equally small, non-representative group," "whose leaders I consider hypocritical thugs." They should be "blamed for their lack of patriotism, but praised for their endurance and ingenuity in fighting the Japanese."

In 1945, Birch, now a captain, was seconded to the U.S. Office of Strategic Services (OSS), the U.S. wartime intelligence service in World War II. At first, he criticized the OSS, wanting only to work for Chennault. V-J Day, August 14, signaled the end of formal hostilities, but under terms of the Japanese surrender, the Japanese Army was ordered to continue occupying the areas it controlled until they could be surrendered to the Nationalist government, even in places where the Chinese Communist-led government had been the de facto state for a decade. This led to continued fighting as the Chinese Communists sought to expel all Japanese imperial forces, which it perceived to include U.S. personnel, who were then openly collaborating with the remaining Japanese forces.

In his diary, OSS Major Gustav Krause, commanding officer of one of three air bases in China and now in command of Captain Birch, noted: "Birch is a good officer, but I'm afraid is too brash and may run into trouble."

== Death ==
After the formal Japanese surrender on August 15, 1945, OSS agents in China were ordered to northern China to take the surrender of Japanese commanders at their installations. The Chinese Communists, who controlled much of the mountainous area, were supposedly allies with the United States, but were not allowed to accept the surrender. Birch told a friend that he was not worried about going into Communist-controlled territory, since he had worked with Communists many times and had little trouble with them.

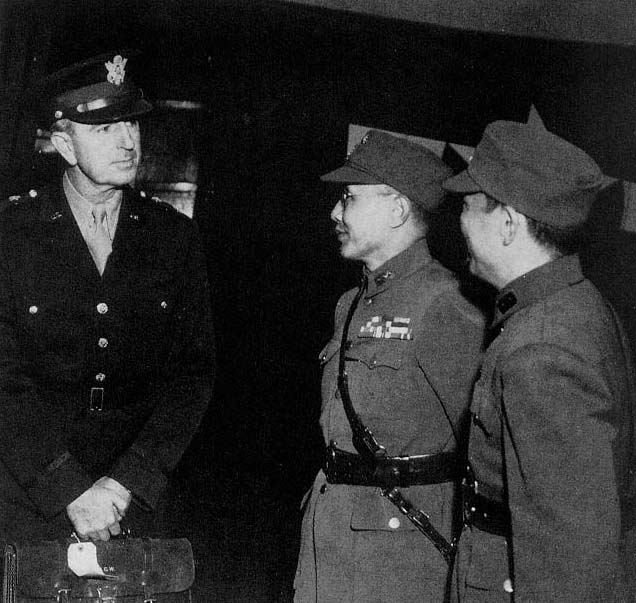
General Wedemeyer arriving in Chongqing, 1944.

On August 20, Birch left Xi'an for Xuzhou, where a Japanese facility and airfield was located, in command of a group consisting of two American soldiers, a civilian OSS operative, five Chinese officers, and two Koreans who spoke Japanese. Birch's mission, under direct orders from Lieutenant General Albert C. Wedemeyer, the commander of U.S. forces in China, was to go to Shandong Province to seize Japanese documents and to obtain information on airfields from which American prisoners of war (POWs) could be flown. Birch and his group traveled by foot, by Chinese junk, and by foot again, until they reached Guide (now Shangqiu), along the Longhai railway.

On August 24, after spending two nights in a nearby village, Birch's group boarded a train at Guide, with a Chinese general and his orderly escorting them to Xuzhou, where Birch was to meet a Chinese general. Halfway and 45 miles (72 km) from Xuzhou, the train was stopped at the Dangshan railway station, where the group was informed that the line ahead had been sabotaged. Birch and his group continued for ten more miles (16 km) until the train could not proceed because of missing track. A Japanese patrol arrived by handcar with replacement rails and repaired the track. Birch sent the train back to Dangshan and his group spent the night in a nearby village, which had been ravaged with men being killed by Chinese Communists.

On the morning of August 25, Birch took over the handcar and continued to Xuzhou with his group, the Chinese general and his orderly. Over a mile (1600 m) down the line they ran into a group of 300 armed Communists. Birch and Lieutenant Tung, who was his aide on the mission, were told to surrender their weapons and equipment, which included three radios. Birch, who was wearing his Army uniform, identified himself and refused to turn over his weapon; after arguing with the Communist commander, they were allowed to proceed. Further along the way, Birch's group encountered a group of Communists who were ripping up tracks and cutting down telephone poles. With Tung's help in speaking with the Communists, the group was able to continue by handcar, and passed through another group of Chinese Communists.

When they arrived at the Huangkou railway station, which was occupied by Communist forces, Birch and Tung met the Communist military leader there, who was accompanied by about twenty soldiers. Birch identified himself and refused to give up his sidearm. Tung, who was unarmed and tried to help Birch talk with the Communist leader, was ordered to be shot. He was hit in the right thigh, and then clubbed on the head with a rifle butt. Afterwards, Birch, whose pistol was still holstered, was ordered shot; he was hit in the left thigh. His ankles and hands were then bound and, while kneeling, he was shot in the head. Birch's body was then bayonetted and both bodies were thrown in a ditch. The rest of Birch's team were taken prisoner. When they were able to do so, Chinese farmers took both bodies to the Chinese hospital at Xuzhou, where an autopsy was completed on Birch. Lieutenant Bill Miller, whose group was to have met up with Birch's group at Xuzhou, arrived on August 29. After learning about Birch and Tung, Miller immediately interviewed Tung, who had lost his leg and an eye. The autopsy report revealed that Birch had been shot in the leg, had his hands and ankles tied, and had been shot in the back of the head and bayonetted. Tung revealed to Miller that, after he heard the third shot, he was thrown into the ditch next to Birch. Two weeks later, the other prisoners were released. A number of different explanations and theories as to why Birch was killed have been proposed, including his party showing up at Huangkou instead of Ninchuan, Birch's scheduled meeting with Chinese collaborationist troops of the Sixth Army under General Hu Bengzhu, a misunderstanding by local guerrillas, and provocation from Birch himself.

Birch, along with two American pilots who had died in a plane crash at the Xuzhou airport, were interred in side-by-side crypts. A Roman Catholic service was held in the cathedral in Xuzhou by Italian Jesuit priests, and 24 Chinese individuals carried the three American-flag-draped coffins in a procession to the burial site on the slope of Hung-lung Mountain, on the south side of Xuzhou. Final rites were given at the graveside by a Chinese Christian minister. Miller, who was a friend of Birch, was in charge of the funeral, and Chinese officers and Japanese soldiers gave the deceased full military honors.

Birch was the fifth of five OSS combat casualties in China.

== Military awards ==
U.S. Senator William F. Knowland attempted unsuccessfully to obtain posthumous awards for Birch, including the Distinguished Service Cross and the Purple Heart, but these were not approved on the grounds that the United States was not at war with the Communist Chinese in 1945. Captain Birch received the following military awards:

Distinguished Service Medal	Legion of Merit with oak leaf cluster	Army Presidential Unit Citation
American Campaign Medal with star	Asiatic-Pacific Campaign Medal with four stars	World War II Victory Medal
Republic of China Medal of the Armed Forces (Grade B, Second Class)	Republic of China Order of the Cloud and Banner	Republic of China War Memorial Medal

== John Birch Society ==
Birch is mainly known today by the society that bears his name. The John Birch Society was established in Indianapolis, Indiana, during a two-day session on December 8 and 9, 1958, by a group of twelve led by Robert W. Welch Jr., a retired candy manufacturer and conservative political activist from Belmont, Massachusetts. In 1954, Welch authored the first book about Birch titled The Life of John Birch: In the story of one American boy, the ordeal of his age. He organized the JBS to promote "less government, more responsibility, and a better world". Welch named the new organization after Birch, saying that Birch was an unknown but dedicated anti-communist, and the first American casualty of the Cold War. Jimmy Doolittle, U.S. Army, Retired, who met Birch in China after Doolittle's raid on Tokyo, Japan, said in his 1991 autobiography: "[Birch] had no way of knowing that the John Birch Society, a highly vocal postwar anti-communist organization, would be named after him because its founders believed him to be the 'first casualty of World War III.' I feel sure he would not have approved."

Welch received permission from Birch's parents to name the JBS after their son, and both his mother and father participated in Society-related events.

== Memorials ==
- Birch's name is on the bronze plaque of a World War II monument at the top of Coleman Hill Park overlooking downtown Macon, Georgia along with the names of other Macon servicemen who died in the military.
- Birch has a plaque on the sanctuary of the First Southern Methodist Church of Macon, which was built on land given by his family, purchased with the money he sent home monthly.
- "The John Birch Hall", a building at the First Baptist Church of Fort Worth, Texas, was named after Birch by Pastor J. Frank Norris.
- "John Birch Memorial Drive", a street in Townsend, Massachusetts, is named for him.
- John Birch University, later Robert Welch University, was founded by the JBS and named after Birch.

Birch has a memorial plaque in Rose Hill Cemetery in Macon, Georgia.

== See also ==
- Protestant missions in China 1807–1953
