= Hotel Brown =

Historic site in Flasher, North Dakota, US

- U.S. National Register of Historic Places
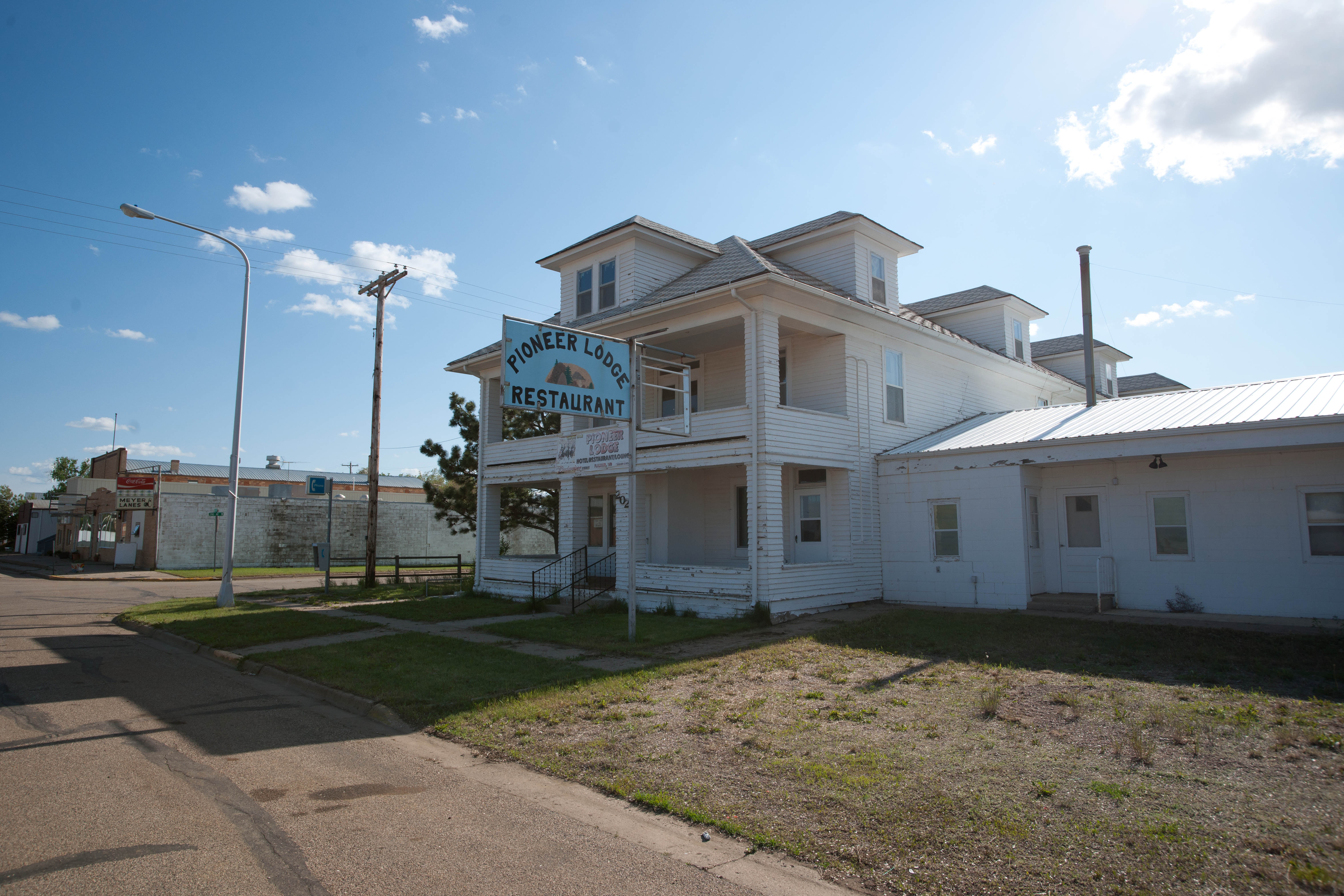

- Location within North Dakota Location within the United States
- Location: Flasher, North Dakota
- Coordinates: 46°27′15″N 101°13′56″W
- NRHP reference No.: 14000335
- Added to NRHP: June 23, 2014

Hotel Brown is a national historic site located at 202 Main St. N., Flasher, North Dakota in Morton County. As of 2026, Hotel Brown is no longer in operation and appears to have been left abandoned. The hotel leaves behind a noteworthy operation time of over a century.

It was added to the National Register of Historic Places on June 23, 2014.

The State Historical Society of North Dakota announced its NRHP listing in 2014 with statement:

The Hotel Brown in Flasher has had numerous names since it was built in 1910 but it is remembered as the local gathering place for travelers and locals, especially in the 1930s and 1940s. It is one of the oldest buildings in the community in its original location and it still serves the community by providing lodging.
