= Navy Service Medal =

Military decoration of South Vietnam

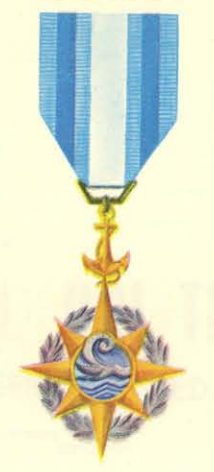
- Navy Service Medal - Honour class - Third type
- Awarded for: Service for a prescribed number of years with the Republic of Vietnam Navy
- Presented by: South Vietnam
- Eligibility: Officers, NCOs, and seamen
- Status: No longer awarded
- Established: May 12, 1964
- First award: 1964
- Final award: 1974
- First class ribbon Second class ribbon Third class ribbon Honour class ribbon

Precedence
- Next (higher): Air Service Medal
- Next (lower): none

The Navy Service Medal was a decoration of the Republic of Vietnam. established by Decree No. 154 of 12 May 1964, it was intended to recognise members of the South Vietnamese Navy who had completed a set number of years of service.

== Classes ==
The medal was divided into four classes indicated by a device on the ribbon bar:

- First Class: This class recognised sailors who had served more than fifteen years in the navy. This class was indicated by two silver depictions of three waves and a silver compass rose.
- Second Class: This class recognised sailors who had served more than ten years in the navy. This class was indicated by two silver depictions of three waves.
- Third Class: This class recognised sailors who had served more than five years in the navy. This class was indicated by a silver depiction of three waves.
- Honour Class: this class recognised members of other branches of the ARVN.

== Description ==
During its existence, the medal went through three designs:

Type 1: This design features a light blue disc depicting a silver whale swimming in light blue waves beneath a light blue sky. The disc surmounted a golden compass rose, which in turn surmounted a silver anchor. The reverse was plain. The suspension device was a standard trapezoid device.

Type 2: This design was a golden anchor surmounted by a six-spoked ship's wheel; the reverse was either plain or had the words "VIỆT-NAM" surrounded by the words "HẢI-VỤ BỘI-TINH". The suspension device was a standard trapezoid device.

Type 3: This design features a light blue disc depicting a silver whale swimming in light blue waves beneath a light blue sky. The disc surmounted a golden compass rose, which in turn was surrounded by a silver wreath. The reverse was inscribed "VIỆT-NAM". The suspension device was a fouled anchor.
