= Larry McDonald =

American politician (1935–1983)

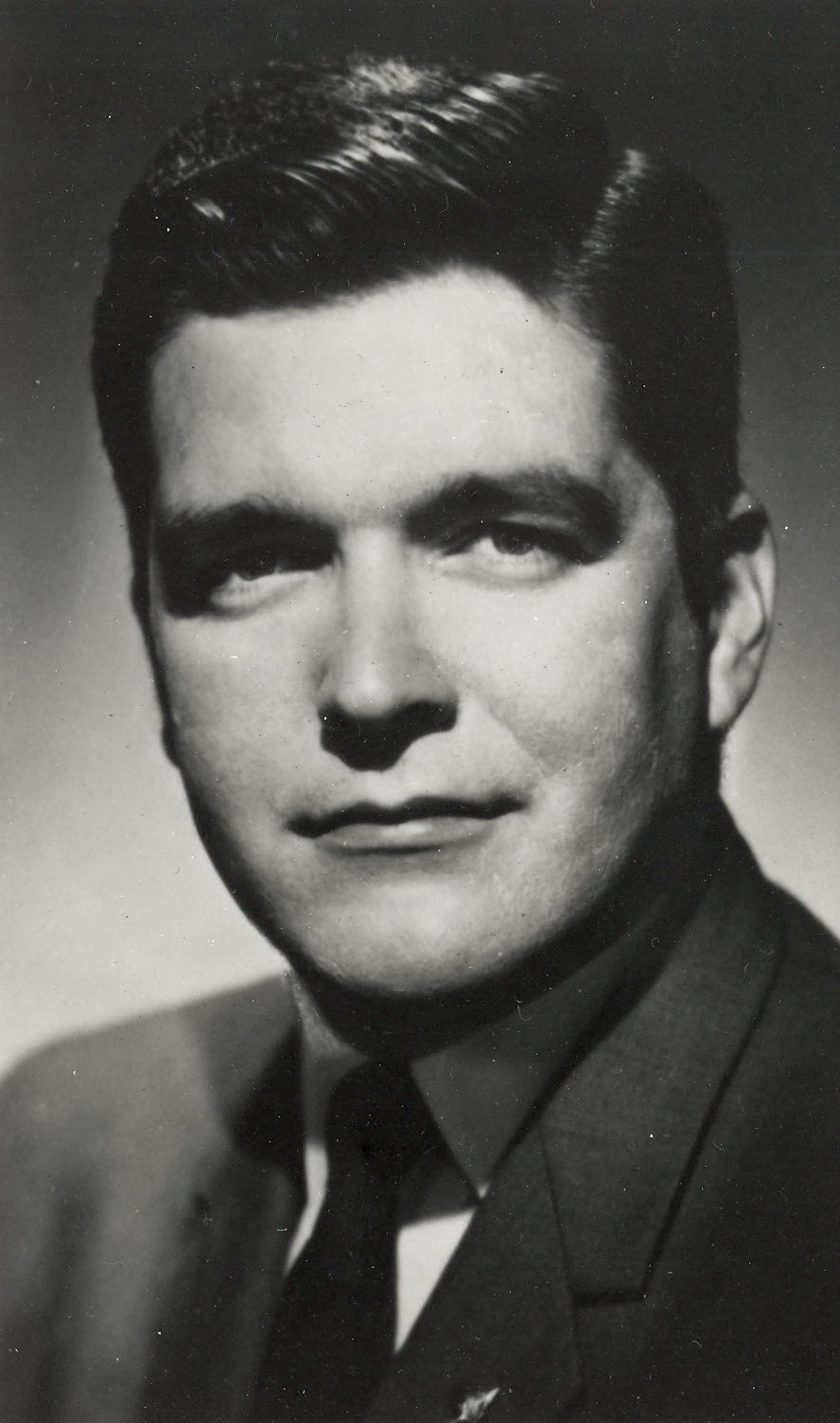

Member of the U.S. House of Representatives from Georgia's 7th district
- In office January 3, 1975 – September 1, 1983
- Preceded by: John Davis
- Succeeded by: Buddy Darden

Personal details
- Born: Lawrence Patton McDonald; April 1, 1935 Atlanta, Georgia, U.S.
- Died: September 1, 1983 (aged 48) near Sakhalin, Russian SFSR, Soviet Union
- Cause of death: Plane crash
- Party: Democratic
- Spouses: Anna Tryggvadottir (divorced); Kathryn Jackson (m. 1975)
- Children: 5
- Education: Davidson College; Emory University (MD)
- Occupation: Politician, military officer, urologist

Military service
- Allegiance: United States
- Branch/service: United States Navy
- Years of service: 1959–1961

Lawrence Patton McDonald (April 1, 1935 – September 1, 1983) was an American physician, politician and a member of the United States House of Representatives, representing Georgia's 7th congressional district as a Democrat from 1975 until he died as a passenger on board Korean Air Lines Flight 007 when it was shot down by Soviet interceptors.

McDonald maintained the most conservative voting record of any Democrat in Congress and was anti-communist. He became chairman of the John Birch Society in 1983, months before his death. He was remembered as a martyr by American conservatives.

== Early life and career ==
Lawrence Patton McDonald was born and raised in Atlanta, Georgia, in the eastern part of the city that is in DeKalb County. General George S. Patton was a distant relative. As a child, he attended several private and parochial schools before attending a non-denominational high school. He spent two years at high school before graduating in 1951. He studied at Davidson College from 1951 to 1953, studying history. He entered the Emory University School of Medicine at the age of 17, graduating in 1957. He interned at Grady Memorial Hospital in Atlanta. He trained as a urologist at the University of Michigan Hospital under Reed M. Nesbit. Following completion in 1966 he returned to Atlanta and entered practice with his father.

From 1959 to 1961, McDonald served as a flight surgeon in the United States Navy stationed at the Keflavík naval base in Iceland. He married an Icelandic national, Anna Tryggvadottir, with whom he eventually had three children: Tryggvi Paul, Callie Grace, and Mary Elizabeth. In Iceland, McDonald asserted to his commanding officer that the U.S. Embassy in Reykjavik was doing things advantageous to communists, but was told he did not understand the big picture.

After his tour of service he practiced medicine at the McDonald Urology Clinic in Atlanta. He joined the anti-communist John Birch Society in 1966 or 1967. He hosted thousands of people in his living room for Bircher-inspired lectures and documentaries, according to his first wife. His preoccupation with politics led to a divorce. He became known as an anti-abortion activist. He made one unsuccessful run for Congress in 1972 before being elected in 1974. In 1975, he married Kathryn Jackson, whom he met while giving a speech in California.

He served as a member on the Georgia State Medical Education Board and as chairman from 1969 to 1974.

== U. S. Representative ==
In 1974, McDonald ran for Congress against incumbent John W. Davis in the Democratic primary. McDonald opposed mandatory federal school integration programs, and criticized Davis for being one of two Georgia congressmen to vote in favor of school busing. He also attacked Davis for receiving political donations from out-of-state groups which he said favored busing.

McDonald won the primary election in an upset and was elected in November 1974 to the 94th United States Congress, serving Georgia's 7th congressional district, which included most of Atlanta's northwestern suburbs (including Marietta), where opposition to school busing was especially high. However, during the general election, J. Quincy Collins Jr., an Air Force prisoner of war during the Vietnam War, running as a Republican, nearly defeated him, despite the poor performance of Republicans nationally that year due to the aftereffects of the Watergate scandal.

McDonald, who considered himself a traditional Democrat "cut from the cloth of Jefferson and Jackson", was known for his conservative views, even by Southern Democratic standards of the time. In fact, one scoring method published in the American Journal of Political Science named him the second most conservative member of either chamber of Congress between 1937 and 2002 (behind only Ron Paul, who was his closest confidant in Congress). Even though many of McDonald's constituents had begun splitting their tickets and voting Republican at the federal level as early as the 1960s, the GOP was still well behind the Democrats at the local level, and conservative Democrats like McDonald continued to hold most state and local offices well into the 1990s.

The American Conservative Union gave him a perfect score of 100 every year he was in the House of Representatives, except in 1978, when he scored a 95. He also scored "perfect or near perfect ratings" on the congressional scorecards of the National Right to Life Committee, Gun Owners of America, and the American Security Council.

McDonald admired Senator Joseph McCarthy and was a member of the Joseph McCarthy Foundation. He hired former staffers of the House Committee on Un-American Activities to work in his own congressional office to continue their research on left-wing groups, which was shared with law enforcement. He considered communism an international conspiracy. An admirer of Austrian economics and a member of the Ludwig von Mises Institute, he advocated tight monetary policy in the late 1970s against stagflation, and advocated returning to the gold standard. He displayed a portrait of Francisco Franco, the Spanish dictator, in his office.

McDonald called the welfare state a "disaster" and favored phasing control of the Great Society programs over to the states. He also favored cuts to foreign aid, which he said "you could take a chainsaw to". McDonald co-sponsored a resolution "expressing the sense of the Congress that homosexual acts and the class of individuals who advocate such conduct shall never receive special consideration or a protected status under law".

He advocated the use of the non-approved drug laetrile to treat patients in advanced stages of cancer despite medical opinion that such use was quackery. He was ordered to pay thousands of dollars in a laetrile malpractice lawsuit in 1976. An investigation by the Atlanta Constitution later that year found that a friend of McDonald, a Georgia doctor, was asking patients seeking laetrile treatment to make their checks out to the Larry McDonald for Congress campaign.

McDonald opposed the establishment of a Martin Luther King, Jr. Day, saying the FBI had evidence that King "was associated with and being manipulated by communists and secret communist agents". A firearms enthusiast and game hunter, McDonald reportedly had "about 200" guns at his official district residence.

In 1979, with John Rees and Major General John K. Singlaub, McDonald founded the Western Goals Foundation. According to The Spokesman-Review, it was intended to "blunt subversion, terrorism, and communism" by filling the gap "created by the disbanding of the House Un-American Activities Committee and what [McDonald] considered to be the crippling of the FBI during the 1970s". McDonald became the chairman of the John Birch Society in 1983, succeeding Robert Welch. At the time of his death, Western Goals was being sued by the ACLU for obtaining illegal Los Angeles Police Department Intelligence Files from 1975 that had been ordered destroyed and computerizing them in a database on a $100,000 computer in Long Beach at the house of an attorney connected to the U.S. intelligence community. Many of these files concerned individuals from Ronald Reagan's term as Governor of California, and it was speculated that Western Goals was using these files to blackmail figures in the Reagan Presidential Administration.

McDonald opposed the Chattahoochee River National Recreation Area in his own district because he did not believe the federal government could constitutionally own national parks.

McDonald rarely spoke on the House floor, preferring to insert material into the Congressional Record. These insertions typically dealt with foreign policy issues relating to the Soviet Union and domestic issues centered on the growth of non-Soviet and Soviet sponsored leftist subversion. A number of McDonald's insertions relating to the Socialist Workers Party were collected into a book, Trotskyism and Terror: The Strategy of Revolution, published in 1977.

=== Legislation introduced ===
During his time in Congress, McDonald introduced over 150 bills, including legislation to:

- Repeal the Gun Control Act of 1968.
- Remove the limitation upon the amount of outside income a Social Security recipient may earn.
- Award honorary U.S. citizenship to Russian dissident Aleksandr Solzhenitsyn.
- Invite Solzhenitsyn to address a joint meeting of Congress.
- Prohibit Federal funds from being used to finance the purchase of American agricultural commodities by any Communist country.
- Create a select committee in the House of Representatives to conduct an investigation of human rights abuses in Southeast Asia by Communist forces.
- Repeal the FCC regulations against editorializing and support of political candidates by noncommercial educational broadcasting stations.
- Create a House Committee on Internal Security.
- Impeach UN Ambassador Andrew Young.
- Limit eligibility for appointment and admission to any United States service academy to men.
- Direct the Comptroller General of the United States to audit the gold held by the United States annually.
- Increase the national speed limit to 65 miles per hour (105 km/h) from the then-prevailing national speed limit of 55 miles per hour (89 km/h).
- Abolish the Federal Election Commission.
- Pull the U.S. out of the United Nations.
- Place statues of African American leaders Booker T. Washington and George Washington Carver in the U.S. Capitol.

== Death ==
McDonald was invited to South Korea to attend a celebration of the 30th anniversary of the United States–South Korea Mutual Defense Treaty with three fellow members of Congress, Senator Jesse Helms of North Carolina, Senator Steve Symms of Idaho, and Representative Carroll Hubbard of Kentucky. Due to bad weather on Sunday, August 28, 1983, McDonald's flight from Atlanta was diverted to Baltimore and when he finally arrived at JFK Airport in New York, he had missed his connection to South Korea by two or three minutes.

McDonald could have boarded a Pan Am Boeing 747 flight to Seoul, but he preferred the lower fares of Korean Air Lines and chose to wait for the next KAL flight two days later. Simultaneously, Hubbard and Helms planned to meet with McDonald to discuss how to join McDonald on the KAL 007 flight. As the delays mounted, instead of joining McDonald, Hubbard at the last minute gave up on the trip, canceled his reservations, and accepted a Kentucky speaking engagement. Helms attempted to join McDonald but was also delayed.

McDonald occupied an aisle seat, 02B in the first class section, when KAL 007 took off on August 31 at 12:24 AM local time, on a 3,400 miles (5,500 km) trip to Anchorage, Alaska for a scheduled stopover seven hours later. The plane remained on the ground for an hour and a half during which it was refueled, reprovisioned, cleaned, and serviced. The passengers were given the option of leaving the aircraft but McDonald remained on the plane, catching up on his sleep. Helms meanwhile had managed to arrive and invited McDonald to move onto his flight, KAL 015, but McDonald did not wish to be disturbed.

With a fresh flight crew, KAL 007 took off at 4 AM local time for its scheduled non-stop flight over the Pacific to Seoul's Kimpo International Airport, a nearly 4,500 miles (7,200 km) flight that would take approximately eight hours. On September 1, 1983, McDonald and the rest of the passengers and crew of KAL 007 were killed when Soviet fighters, under the command of Gen. Anatoly Kornukov, shot down KAL 007 near Moneron Island after the plane entered Soviet airspace.

== Aftermath ==
McDonald became a martyr to his supporters, who thought he was assassinated in a communist conspiracy. According to his widow, President Reagan was reluctant to take actions against the Soviet Union.

After McDonald's death, a special election was held to fill his seat in the House. Former Governor Lester Maddox stated his intention to run for the seat if McDonald's widow, Kathy McDonald, did not.

Kathy McDonald did decide to run, but lost to George "Buddy" Darden.

=== Tribute ===
On March 18, 1998, the Georgia House of Representatives, "to preserve the memory of the sacrifice and service of this able and outstanding Georgian and recognize his service to the people of his district", named the portion of Interstate 75, which runs from the Chattahoochee River northward to the Tennessee state line in his honor, the Larry McDonald Memorial Highway.

== Bibliography ==
Articles

- "Why Does Spotlight Attack the Real Anti-Communists?" Congressional Record, September 9, 1981.

Books

- We Hold These Truths: A Reverent Review of the U.S. Constitution. Seal Beach, CA: '76 Press, 1976. ISBN 0892450053.

Revised edition: Larry McDonald Memorial Foundation, Inc., 1992. ISBN 978-0963280909.

- Trotskyism and Terror: The Strategy of Revolution. Introduction by M. Stanton Evans. Foreword by Marx Lewis. Washington, D.C.: ACU Education and Research Institute, 1977.

Contributed works

- "Introduction." The Rockefeller File, by Gary Allen. Seal Beach, CA: '76 Press, 1976. ISBN 0892450010.
- "China in Africa." Sino-Soviet Intervention in Africa, by Roger Pearson. Washington, D.C.: Council on American Affairs, 1977. OCLC 3100665.
- The Future of the United Nations: A Roundtable Discussion (Audiobook). Washington, D.C.: American Enterprise Institute for Public Policy Research, 1977. OCLC 2914756.

Remarks on the UN, its past and future, and its relations with the United States.

Articles by other authors

- Dorman, Zach. "The Congressman Who Created His Own Deep State. Really.". Politico, December 2, 2018.

== See also ==
- Boll weevil (politics)
- John G. Schmitz
- John Rarick
- List of members of the United States Congress killed or wounded in office
- List of members of the United States Congress who died in office (1950–1999)
- Willem Witteveen, another politician killed when an airliner was shot down

U.S. House of Representatives
Preceded by John Davis	Member of the U.S. House of Representatives from Georgia's 7th congressional district 1975–1983	Succeeded by George Darden
Other offices
Preceded by Robert W. Welch Jr.	Chairman of the John Birch Society; 1983	Succeeded by Robert W. Welch Jr.
