= John Rees (journalist) =

British-American government informant and publisher (born c. 1926)

John Herbert Rees
- Born: c. 1926; United Kingdom
- Other names: John Seeley, John O’Connor
- Occupations: Journalist, publisher, private intelligence operative
- Spouse: Sheila Louise O'Connor/Rees

John Herbert Rees is a British right-wing journalist and government informant resident in the United States. He was a co-founder of the Western Goals Foundation and active in the John Birch Society.

== Biography ==
Rees was born in Britain. In the early 1960s, Rees worked in a business position for the London Daily Mirror, but was fired for misusing personal accounts, according to an FBI memo. Agents in the FBI office at the London U.S. Embassy also found that during 1962 Rees, who was married and had five children, was dating an FBI stenographer, who resigned. Rees moved to the United States in 1963 for a reporting job that fell through.

Rees became the lover of Peyton Place author Grace Metalious. Metalious, who had cirrhosis from heavy drinking, changed her will hours before her death at age 39 in 1964, and left her whole estate to Rees. There was a public furor, and Rees dropped claims to the estate, which was insolvent.

Rees remarried. He launched at a job training program in Newark, New Jersey, in 1967; it was partly funded by the United States Labor Department, which cut off funding when it determined Rees had overcharged the city. Rees became a police informant in Newark. He began his newsletter Information Digest in 1967. He also marketed his new organization called National Goals, "specializing in areas of education, training and law enforcement". He sought work with the FBI, which rebuffed him, determining in a 1968 internal memo that he was unethical. Rees went undercover in Chicago, covertly taping political meetings for testimony he gave to the House Un-American Activities Committee (HUAC). He married his third wife, Sheila Louise O'Connor, and they moved to Washington in 1971. He was a police informant in Washington. She became an office manager at the National Lawyers Guild, which was representing activists and antiwar groups; he gave internal Guild documents to the FBI. In 1975, Congressman Larry McDonald hired Rees to his office staff.

Rees traded information with police and informants, publishing some of it in Information Digest. Political Research Associates said Rees's network had better placed infiltrators among college activist campus groups than the FBI's agents. Ross Gelbspan wrote that the FBI began to work with Rees around 1980. Rees forwarded information to the Director of Intelligence at FBI headquarters, especially when there was a credible risk to students. From there it would be forwarded to field offices. These activities were part of a network of private right-wing groups that the FBI used to gather intelligence on cults active on campus, government critics and activists opposed to the Reagan Administration's foreign policy in Central America.

In 1976, an investigation by the New York State Assembly concluded that police had used reports published by Rees in Information Digest to assemble dossiers on many activists who had committed no crimes.

In 1979, Rees worked with McDonald and John K. Singlaub to create the Western Goals Foundation, where Rees's title was editor. Rees set up the foundation's computer database to track suspected radicals, and wrote many of the foundation's published reports about domestic subversives, terrorism and communist threats. People in law enforcement sometimes leaked derogatory intelligence to Western Goals, which Rees then published in newsletters. These in turn were entered into the Congressional Record by McDonald, which shielded him from libel. Western Goals would then cite McDonald's statements in its own public reports. Rees left Western Goals in 1983 after McDonald's death.

Rees founded the Maldon Institute, a nonprofit funded by the Scaife family.

Nancy Reagan greets Rees and Linda Guell of Western Goals

== Publishing ==
Rees was associated with Review of the News and American Opinion, published by the John Birch Society, with which Rees was an active collaborator.

Rees published Information Digest, a newsletter that touted reporting on "the operations and real capabilities of social movements and political groups". Annual subscriptions were $500. According to The Village Voice, copies circulated among intelligence officials and conservative politicians including Ronald Reagan. Rees was noted for criticizing Lyndon LaRouche and the LaRouche movement, which he wrote had "taken on the characteristics more of a political cult than a political party" and a cult-like "blind obedience."

Rees launched and managed another newsletter, International Reports: Early Warning. Rees was also an editor for Conservative Digest magazine.
