= The New American =

Right-wing American magazine

- October 14, 2024 cover
- Editor: Gary Benoit
- Categories: Magazine, Internet
- Frequency: Monthly
- Publisher: Steve Bonta
- Total circulation: 20,194 (2021)
- First issue: September 30, 1985
- Company: American Opinion Publishing
- Country: United States
- Based in: Appleton, Wisconsin
- Language: English
- Website: thenewamerican.com
- ISSN: 0885-6540

The New American is an American right-wing, sometimes described as far-right, print magazine published once a month and a digital news source published daily online by American Opinion Publishing, Inc., a wholly owned subsidiary of the John Birch Society. The magazine was created in 1985 from the merger of two John Birch Society publications: American Opinion and The Review of the News.

== History ==
In February 1956, over two years before founding the John Birch Society, Robert W. Welch Jr. created his first publication, a monthly entitled One Man's Opinion, which became known two years later as American Opinion. Joyce Mao states that it was "perhaps best described as a stridently anticommunist Reader's Digest", continuing on to say that "the rebranding and expansion reflected Welch's increasing confidence in his ability to speak for an entire nation, or to claim his and other right-wing voices as the only ones that were capable of proper patriotism."

Additionally, in 1965, he established a John Birch Society-affiliated publication known as The Review of the News, which was intended for a larger readership and covered news.

In September 1985, American Opinion was merged with The Review of the News to create The New American, with the aim of attracting a readership large enough to "make the saving of our country possible." Published bimonthly from its founding to 2025, the magazine's name was inspired by Robert Welch's "New Americanism" essay. It was first headquartered in Belmont, Massachusetts.

The version of anticommunism espoused by the John Birch Society in The New American has alleged that American sovereignty and freedom are threatened by a conspiracy of powerful "Insiders" who are purportedly moving toward control of a world government in a new world order. As described by the academic Charles J. Stewart, articles in the magazine in the 1980s and 1990s argued that the collapse of communism in the Eastern Bloc at the end of the Cold War was a tactical move in the conspiracy and a "jump forward in the development of socialism". The magazine has alleged that such a conspiracy also animates the United Nations, the European Union, and the North American Free Trade Agreement.

In 2006, The New American launched a mobile edition. In 2007, The New American published a special issue devoted to opposing a purported North American Union, and approximately 500,000 copies were distributed; Political Research Associates and the Southern Poverty Law Center described such descriptions of an imminent loss of American sovereignty in a merger with Canada and Mexico as a conspiracy theory.

In September 2019, during the Trump–Ukraine scandal, Hunter Biden's Wikipedia article included dubious claims about his business dealings in Ukraine and his father Joe Biden's motivations for going after a Ukrainian prosecutor; the claims were sourced to The Epoch Times and The New American.

In July 2025, The New American converted its print edition from a bimonthly to a monthly magazine.

== Editorial stance and notable coverage ==
The New American has described what it sees as American moral decline, including abortion, drugs, homosexuality, crime, violence, teenage pregnancy, teen suicide, feminism, and pornography—all of which, it has said, are undermining the family and by extension the American republic. Such emphases have made the John Birch Society attractive to the religious right in the United States.

The New American publishes the Freedom Index, which rates members of Congress and state legislators “based on their adherence to constitutional principles of limited government, fiscal responsibility, national sovereignty and a traditional foreign policy of avoiding foreign entanglements.”

Contributors have included Hilaire du Berrier, Samuel Blumenfeld, Larry McDonald, and Ron Paul. The magazine has interviewed members of Congress including Andy Biggs, Marjorie Taylor Greene, and Ronny Jackson.

== See also ==
- Robert Welch University
