= Dan Smoot =

FBI agent; conservative political broadcaster

Howard "Dan" Smoot
- Born: October 5, 1913; East Prairie, Missouri, U.S.
- Died: July 24, 2003 (aged 89); Tyler, Texas, U.S.
- Education: Southern Methodist University; Harvard University
- Occupations: Federal Bureau of Investigation agent Political commentator
- Political party: Independent
- Spouse(s): Mabeth Evans Smoot (divorced) Virginia McKnight Smoot (died 1996)
- Children: Larry Smoot, Barney Smoot
- Parent(s): Bernie Smooth, Dora Allbright Smoot

Howard Smoot, known as Dan Smoot (October 5, 1913 – July 24, 2003), was a Federal Bureau of Investigation agent and conservative political commentator. From 1956 to 1971, he published The Dan Smoot Report, which was a weekly newsletter and radio program.

== Early life and education ==
Smoot was born on October 5, 1913, in East Prairie, Missouri. At age 10, he became an orphan. Smoot worked odd and manual labor jobs until 1930 when he enrolled in the YMCA and could begin high school. In January 1931, he moved to Dallas, Texas. Southern Methodist University offered him a scholarship and he graduated in 1938. He attended Harvard University for further postgraduate education until he dropped out in 1941 to enlist in the United States Army.

== Career ==
The military rejected Smoot due to medical reasons, so Smoot became an FBI agent to support the World War II effort. Smoot was an FBI agent from 1941 until 1951. He resigned in 1951 to become a political commentator. Smoot was unsuccessful in his campaign for public office, but he rose to fame as a pundit on radio and television. He initially served as the spokesman and face of H. L. Hunt's Facts Forum before leaving to create his own. From 1956 to 1971, he published The Dan Smoot Report, which was a weekly newsletter and later also a 15-minute radio program where he took the position as a constitutional conservative. Alongside Hunt, Billy James Hargis, and Carl McIntire, he has been described as among "four of the era’s most prominent extremist broadcasters".

In 1962, Smoot wrote The Invisible Government concerning early members of the Council on Foreign Relations. Other books include The Hope of the World; The Business End of Government; and his autobiography, People Along the Way. Additionally he was associated with Robert W. Welch, Jr.'s John Birch Society and wrote for the society's American Opinion bi-monthly magazine.

In 1972, Smoot served as campaign manager for American Independent Party presidential candidate John G. Schmitz.

== Personal life ==
Smoot married his high school girlfriend Maybeth Evans on August 11, 1933. They later divorced. He had two children.

== Bibliography ==
- The Hope of the World (1958)
- The Invisible Government (1962)
- The Business End of Government (1973)
- People Along the Way: The Autobiography of Dan Smoot (1993)
