= Arthur Bliss Lane =

American diplomat (1894-1956)

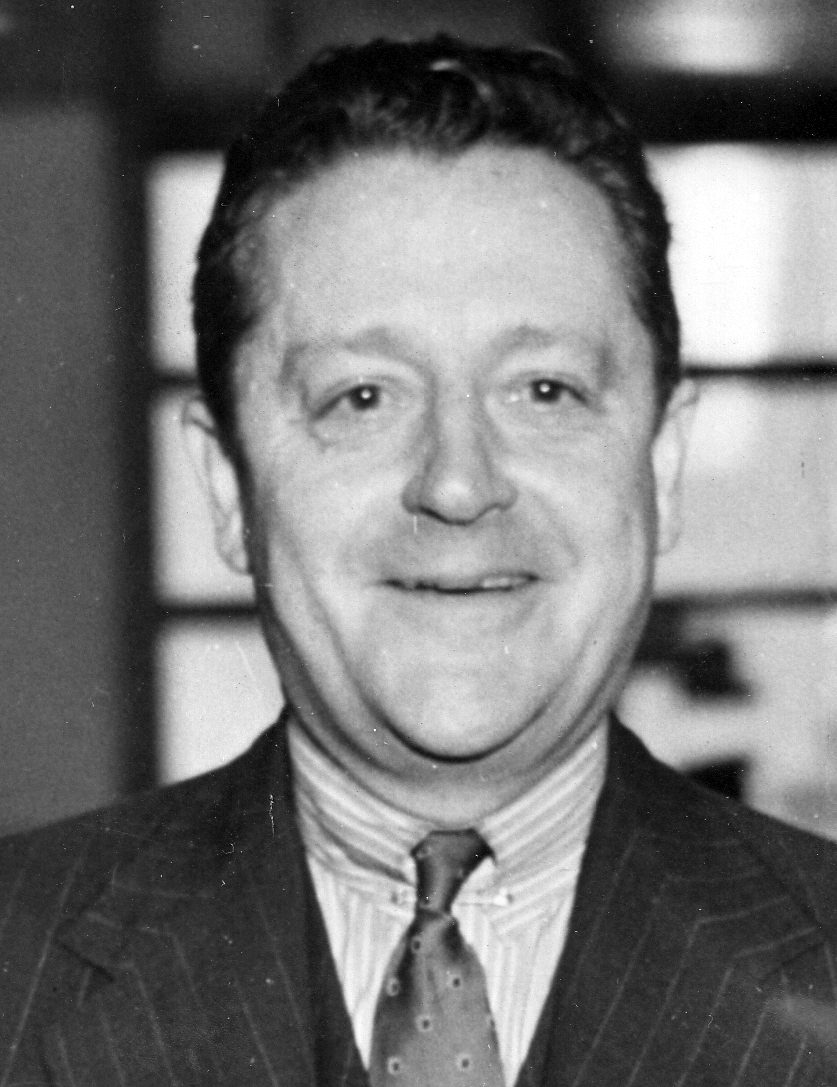

United States Ambassador to Poland
- In office 4 August 1945 – 24 February 1947
- President: Harry Truman
- Preceded by: Anthony J. Drexel Biddle, Jr.
- Succeeded by: Stanton Griffis

United States Ambassador to Colombia
- In office 30 April 1942 – 18 October 1944
- President: Franklin D. Roosevelt
- Preceded by: Spruille Braden
- Succeeded by: John C. Wiley

Personal details
- Born: June 16, 1894 Brooklyn, New York, U.S.
- Died: August 12, 1956 (aged 62) New York City, U.S.

Arthur Bliss Lane (16 June 1894 – 12 August 1956) was a United States diplomat who served in Latin America and Europe. During his diplomatic career he dealt with the rise of a dictatorship in Nicaragua in the 1930s, World War II and its aftermath in Europe, and the rise of the Soviet-installed communist regime in Poland.

== Biography ==
Lane was born in Bay Ridge, Brooklyn, New York on June 16, 1894, and attended Yale University. After graduating in 1916, he became private secretary to the U.S. Ambassador to Italy in Rome. In 1919-1920 he was 2nd secretary in the U.S. embassy to Poland. In 1921-1922, he was 2nd secretary in London. During this time he was secretary to the U.S. delegation to the 1921 Conference of Ambassadors in Paris. He then went to Berne, Switzerland in 1922. From 1923 to 1925 he worked at the U.S. State Department in Washington, D.C. Lane then worked in the embassy in Mexico from 1925 to 1933.

He was appointed U.S. Minister to Nicaragua (1933–1936). While serving there he met with General Somoza while the President of Nicaragua Sacasa held talks with rebel leader Augusto César Sandino. Sandino called for the National Guard run by Somoza to be disbanded, as it had been founded by the U.S. as they withdrew their Marines from the country. Sandino was murdered by Guardsmen after the talks. The U.S. claimed that Lane had counseled Somoza to be patient, but Somoza (and later the Sandinistas) claimed that Lane gave Somoza permission for the assassination. Lane spent the next two years trying to reconcile Somoza and Sacasa, leaving the country before the next election as the U.S. adopted a more non-interventionist policy.

He was next U.S. minister to Estonia, Latvia, and Lithuania from 1936 to 1937; the Kingdom of Yugoslavia (from 1937 to 1941, until the German invasion); and Costa Rica in 1941–1942. He was then appointed Ambassador to Colombia (1942–1944), and subsequently to Poland from 1944 to 1947, first to the Polish government in exile in London and later in Warsaw to the post-war government.

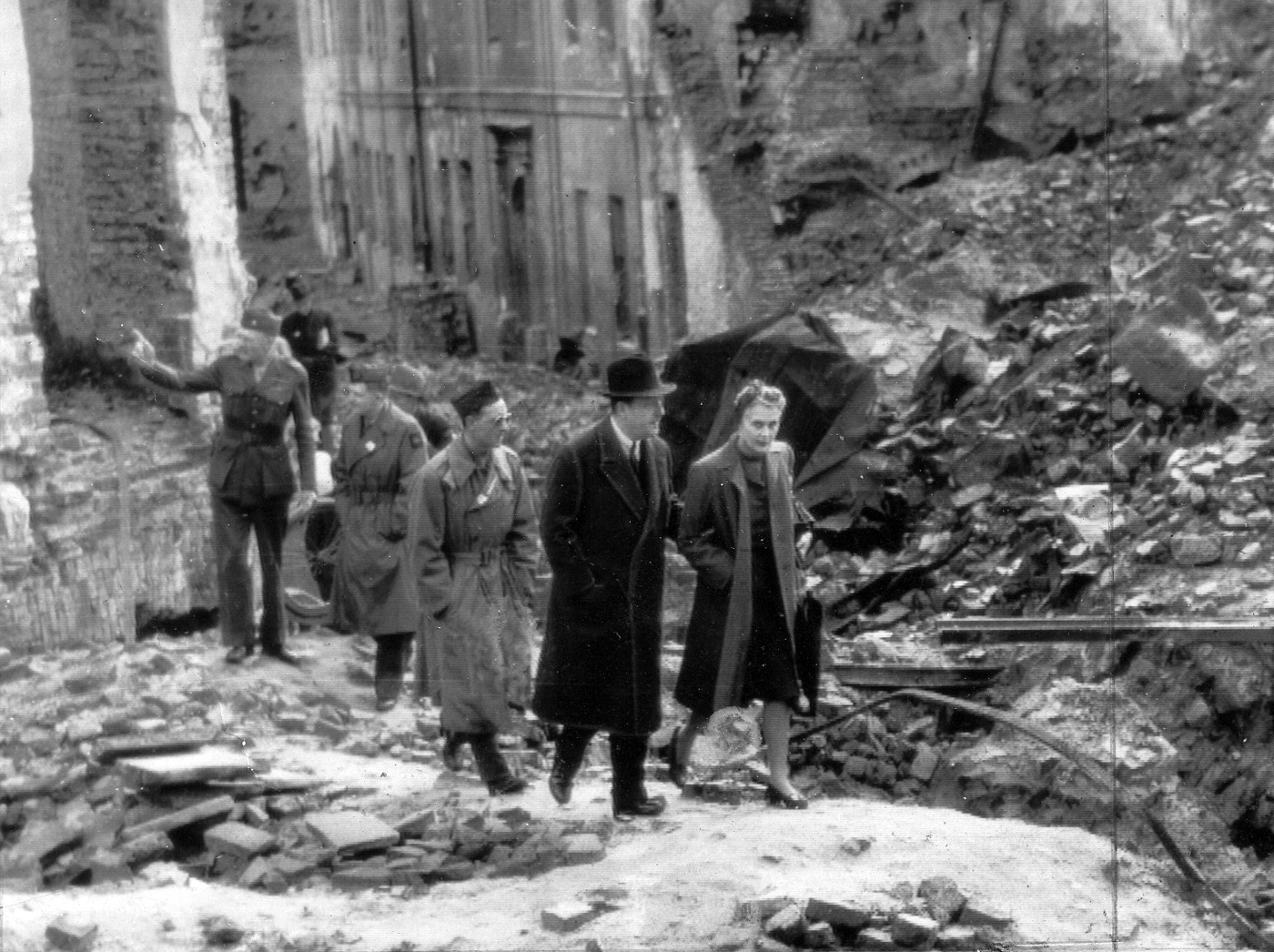
Lane in Warsaw after World War II

While in Poland, Lane resigned his post on February 24, 1947, in protest of the takeover of the country by the Communist puppet regime, and wrote a book detailing what he considered to be the failure of the United States and Britain to keep their promise that the Poles would have a free election after the war. In that book he described what he considered the betrayal of Poland by the Western Allies, hence the title, I Saw Poland Betrayed. The book was translated into Polish and published in the United States, and later disseminated by an underground samizdat publishing house in Poland in the 1980s.

According to Lane, the U.S. and Britain at the Tehran Conference agreed to the dismemberment of eastern Poland. He considered this act a treacherous breach of the United States Constitution, since Roosevelt never reported his decision to the Senate. The Yalta Conference was the final death blow to Poland's hopes for independence and for a democratic form of government, according to Lane.

Following his career at the State Department, Lane was active in investigating the Katyn Massacre and also active in several anti-Communist organizations, such as the National Committee for a Free Europe. He would also later campaign for Republican Dwight D. Eisenhower in the 1952 presidential election.

After his death, Lane's papers were archived in Yale University's Sterling Memorial Library.
