= Western Goals Foundation =

Private intelligence agency in the United States

- Formation: 1979
- Founders: Larry McDonald; John H. Rees; John K. Singlaub
- Dissolved: 1986
- Tax ID no.: 51-024-1925
- Legal status: tax exempt
- Purpose: private intelligence agency
- Headquarters: 309A Cameron St. Alexandria, Virginia 22314; United States

Western Goals Foundation was a private domestic intelligence agency active in the United States. It was founded in 1979 by Major General John K. Singlaub, the publisher and spy John H. Rees, and Congressman Larry McDonald. It went defunct in 1986 when the Tower Commission revealed it had been part of Oliver North's Iran–Contra funding network.

== History ==
After the Watergate and COINTELPRO scandals of the early 1970s, several laws were passed to restrict police intelligence gathering within political organizations and tried to make it necessary to demonstrate that a criminal act was likely to be uncovered by any intelligence gathering proposed. Many files on radicals, collected for decades, were ordered destroyed. The unintended effect of the laws was to privatize the files in the hands of 'retired' intelligence officers and their operatives.

As a private foundation, Western Goals collected information about alleged subversives and passed the information to law enforcement officials, akin to a "mini-deep state". According to former employees, agencies receiving information from Western Goals included the Drug Enforcement Administration, the Bureau of Alcohol, Tobacco, Firearms and Explosives, Federal Bureau of Investigation, Central Intelligence Agency, and police departments.

John Rees and Larry McDonald joined with Major General Singlaub to form Western Goals in 1979. Each founder was also a member of the World Anti-Communist League, the John Birch Society, and similar organizations. One of its principal sponsors was the Texan billionaire Nelson Bunker Hunt.

In 1983, LAPD Detective Jay Paul was under investigation for allegedly leaking LAPD Public Disorder Intelligence Division intelligence to the right-wing group Western Goals Foundation. An internal investigation confirmed that Paul kept PDID files at his home garage in Long Beach. Paul was suspended, but later reinstated with back pay, as his actions were sanctioned by his supervisors.

The organization was based in a townhouse in Alexandria, Virginia. It also said it had offices in West Germany and Austria. A former employee told Politico in 2018 that more of its funding came from West Germany than the United States.

Rees set up a computer database to track suspected radicals, and wrote many of Western Goals' published reports about domestic subversives, terrorism and communist threats. People in law enforcement sometimes leaked derogatory intelligence to Western Goals, which Rees then published in newsletters, which in turn were entered into the Congressional Record by McDonald, which shielded him from libel. Western Goals would then cite McDonald's statements in its own public reports. Unverified reports by Western Goals accusing American pacifist groups of ties to communism and the Soviet Union were also publicized in Reader's Digest and by the Reagan administration.

Western Goals was sued by the American Civil Liberties Union (ACLU) after a police officer was caught adding information from the disbanded Los Angeles Police Department "Red Squad" to a related computer bulletin board system.

Western Goals raised funds for the Nicaraguan Contras starting in 1983, after Congress banned the Reagan administration from providing U.S. support. A Contra brigade of 2,000 was named the Larry McDonald Task Force to honor the Western Goals co-founder, who had been killed in the Soviet downing of Korean Air Lines Flight 007. Singlaub was an intermediary in Oliver North’s illegal weapons network for the Contras. Officials of the foundation were questioned in the Iran-Contra hearings of 1986.

The organization founded an offshoot, Western Goals (UK), later the Western Goals Institute, which was briefly influential in British Conservative politics.

== Advisory board and directors ==
- Hon. Jean Ashbrook
- Mrs. Walter Brennan
- Mrs. Lyman H. Brooks
- Taylor Caldwell
- Roy M. Cohn, Esq.
- Congressman Philip M. Crane
- Gen. Raymond G. Davis
- Miss Julia Ferguson
- Linda Catoe Guell
- Henry Hazlitt
- Dr. Mildred F. Jefferson
- Dr. Anthony Kubek
- Roger Milliken
- Adm. Thomas Moorer
- E. A. Morris
- Vice-Adm. Lloyd M. Mustin
- Mrs. John C. Newington
- General George S. Patton, IV
- Dr. Hans Sennholz
- Dr. Robert C. Shuman
- Major Gen. John K. Singlaub
- Dan Smoot
- Robert Stoddard
- Congressman Bob Stump
- Mrs. Helen Marie Taylor
- Dr. Edward Teller
- Gen. Lewis Walt
- Dr. Eugene Wigner

== Bibliography ==
=== Books ===
- Ally Betrayed: Nicaragua (1980). Foreword by U.S. Ambassador Earl E. T. Smith. U.S. ed. postscript by Turner B. Shelton. Nicaragua ed. postscript by Francisco Urcuyo Maliaños. 112 pages. OCLC 66786515.
- Ally Betrayed: The Republic of China (1982), by David Nelson Rowe. Foreword by Anthony Kubek. Afterword by Patricia Hurley. 107 pages. OCLC 644322258.
- Ally Betrayed: The Republic of Korea (1982), by David Nelson Rowe. Foreword by Major General John K. Singlaub. Postscript by Congressman Bob Stump. 106 pages. OCLC 652330485.
- Red Tide Rising in the Carolinas (1980). 26 pages. OCLC 7009264.
- Broken Seals: A Western Goals Foundation Report on the Attempts to Destroy the Foreign and Domestic Intelligence Capabilities of the U.S. (1980). Introduction by Congressman John M. Ashbrook. Afterword by Lt. Gen. Daniel O. Graham. 110 pages.OCLC 221152534.
- Red Locusts: Soviet Support for Terrorism in South Africa (1981). Foreword by U.S. Senator Jesse Helms. Postscript by Ambassador Marion Smoak.
- Soviet Active Measures Against the United States (1984). 120 pages.

=== Films ===
- No Place to Hide: The Strategy and Tactics of Terrorism (1982). Written, produced, and hosted by G. Edward Griffin. Directed by Dick Quincer. 58 min. OCLC 729257054. Transcript OCLC 54865096.
- The Subversion Factor: A History of Treason in Modern America (1983). Written and hosted by G. Edward Griffin. 120 min. OCLC 36968013. Transcript OCLC 34702813. Part 1: Moles in High Places. Part 2: The Open Gates of Troy.

== See also ==
- John Birch Society
- Western Goals Institute
- Western Islands (publisher)
- World Anti-Communist League
