= Robert W. Welch Jr. =

American businessman and anti-communist conspiracy theorist (1899–1985)

Bob Welch
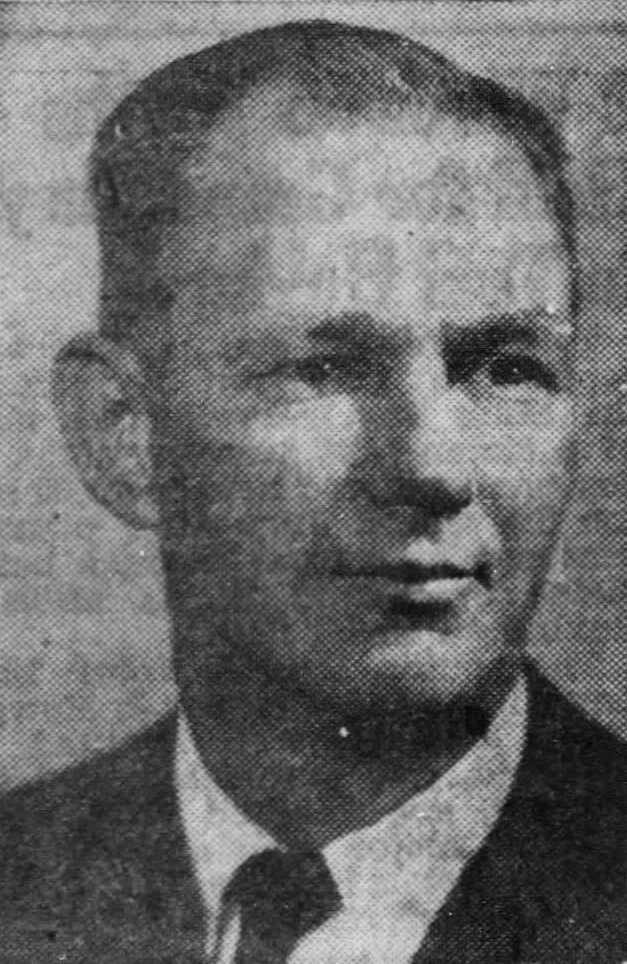
- Welch in 1949
- Born: Robert Henry Winborne Welch Jr. December 1, 1899; Chowan County, North Carolina, U.S.
- Died: January 6, 1985 (aged 85); Winchester, Massachusetts, U.S.
- Education: University of North Carolina, Chapel Hill (BA); United States Naval Academy; Harvard University
- Political party: Republican
- Spouse: Marian Probert
- Children: 2

Robert Henry Winborne Welch Jr. (December 1, 1899 – January 6, 1985) was an American businessman, political organizer, and conspiracy theorist. He was wealthy following his retirement from the candy business and used his wealth to sponsor anti-communist causes. He co-founded the John Birch Society (JBS), an American right-wing political advocacy group, in 1958 and tightly controlled it until his death. He was highly controversial and criticized by liberals, as well as some conservatives, including William F. Buckley Jr.

== Early life ==
Welch was born in Chowan County, North Carolina, the son of Lina Verona (née James) and Robert Henry Winborne Welch Sr.

As a child, he was considered gifted and received his early education at home from his mother, a school teacher. His boyhood home was in Stockton, North Carolina. Welch enrolled in high school at the age of ten and was admitted to the University of North Carolina at Chapel Hill at the age of twelve, the youngest student ever to enroll there. He was a fundamentalist Baptist and, by his own admission, was "insufferable" in his attempts to convert his fellow students.

Welch attended the United States Naval Academy and Harvard Law School but did not graduate from either institution.

== Business career ==
After dropping out of Harvard, in 1922 Welch founded the Oxford Candy Company in Brooklyn, New York, after buying a candy recipe. The business initially struggled to the point that Welch had to take a second job. He hired his brother James to assist him the following year. James Welch left to found his own candy company in 1925. In 1926, the company had 160 employees. Due to difficulties covering costs and Welch's conflict with the board of directors, the Oxford Candy Company went out of business during the Great Depression. Welch continued to try to sell his own product, caramel lollipops later named Sugar Daddies, while working in sales for Brach and Sons for a couple of years. Unsuccessful, Welch filed for bankruptcy and joined his brother's company, the James O. Welch Company. Welch became director of sales and advertising for the company. The company began making Sugar Daddies, and Welch developed other candies such as Sugar Babies, Junior Mints, and Pom Poms. In 1956, upon deciding he needed to spend his time fighting communism, Welch retired a wealthy man.

== Early political activism ==
From his teenage years, Welch was an anti-communist. He was a strong adherent of conspiracy theories, believing many individuals and organizations were part of an international communist plot. In his own words, the American people consisted of four groups: "Communists, communist dupes or sympathizers, the uninformed who have yet to be awakened to the communist danger, and the ignorant." Welch supported the America First Committee, supported Robert Taft's 1940 presidential candidacy, and supported classical liberal ideals.

Prosperous from the candy business, Welch became a director of the Chambers of Commerce in Boston and Cambridge, Massachusetts, and also a national councilor of the U.S. Chamber of Commerce. He also became a director of a local bank and joined the school board of Belmont, Massachusetts, where he lived. Welch was vice president of the National Confectioners Association and worked for the War Production Board and Office of Price Administration in the 1940s. He became a Republican Party official in Massachusetts and ran and lost a primary election in 1950 for Lieutenant Governor of the state. He joined the National Association of Manufacturers' (NAM) board of directors, and also served as a regional vice president and chairman of its education committee. In 1952, he supported Robert A. Taft's unsuccessful bid for the Republican presidential nomination and was a prominent campaign contributor to Wisconsin Senator Joseph McCarthy's re-election campaign.

In 1955, he traveled to Asia to meet Chiang Kai-shek and Syngman Rhee; "a formative moment for Welch, who found himself welcomed with effusive praise as a leading American anti-Communist."

He initially planned to form a third party, but after being rebuffed at the National States Rights Conference in 1956, Welch turned his focus towards public education on the threat of Communism. The same year, he began the magazine One Man's Opinion (later renamed American Opinion); Rhee and Chiang received copies of the first edition and responded positively as they perceived him to be an ally. Welch published his "A Letter to the South" in the magazine that year, in which he blamed Communism for desegregation and spoke against the Brown v. Board of Education decision.

== John Birch Society ==
Welch founded the John Birch Society (JBS) in December 1958 in Indianapolis, Indiana, with Welch giving a "marathon two-day monologue" promoting smaller government and stopping the perceived Communist infiltration of the government. He named the organization for John Birch, an American missionary and military intelligence officer killed in a confrontation with Chinese Communist soldiers in 1945.

Some of the organization's founders were fellow board members of the National Association of Manufacturers who – at odds with the general "probusiness pragmatism" of the NAM – "embraced a conspiratorial view of the New Deal and regarded taxes, unions, and welfare programs as inimical to the nation's heritage." Starting with eleven men, Welch greatly expanded the JBS's membership, exerted very tight control over revenues and set up a number of publications. At its height, the organization claimed it had 100,000 members. Welch distrusted outsiders and did not want alliances with other groups (even other anti-Communists). He developed an elaborate organizational infrastructure in 1958 that enabled him to keep a very tight rein on the chapters.

Its main activity in the 1960s, says Rick Perlstein, "comprised monthly meetings to watch a film by Welch, followed by writing postcards or letters to government officials linking specific policies to the Communist menace".

In 1962, William F. Buckley Jr., in his magazine, National Review, denounced Welch as promoting conspiracy theories far removed from common sense. While not attacking the members of the Society directly, Buckley concentrated his fire upon Welch in order to prevent his controversial views from tarnishing the entire conservative movement. Divergent foreign policy views between Buckley and Welch also played a role in the break.

Being in the tradition of an older, Taftian conservatism, Welch favored a foreign policy of "Fortress America" rather than "entangling alliances" through NATO and the United Nations. For this reason, Welch combined a strong anti-Communism with opposition to the bipartisan Cold War consensus of armed internationalism. Beginning in 1965, he opposed the escalating U.S. role in the Vietnam War. In the view of the more hawkish Buckley, Welch lacked sufficient support for U.S. political and military leadership of the world.

Welch was the editor and publisher of the Society's monthly magazine American Opinion and the weekly The Review of the News, which in 1971 incorporated the writings of another conservative activist, Dan Smoot. He also wrote The Road to Salesmanship (1941), May God Forgive Us (1951), The Politician (about Eisenhower) and The Life of John Birch (1954). A collection of his essays was edited into a book, The New Americanism, which later became the inspiration for the magazine The New American.

In the 1960s, Welch began to believe that even the Communists were not the top level of his perceived conspiracy and began saying that communism was just a front for a Master Conspiracy, which had roots in the Illuminati going back to the founding of the United States; the essay "The Truth in Time" is an example.

He referred to the Conspirators as "The Insiders", seeing them mainly in internationalist financial and business families such as the Rothschilds and Rockefellers, and organizations such as the Bilderbergers, the Council on Foreign Relations, and the Trilateral Commission. As a result of his conspiracy theories, the John Birch Society became synonymous with the "radical right".

In 1983, Welch stepped down as president of the John Birch Society. He was succeeded as president by Congressman Larry McDonald, who died a few months later when the airliner he was on was shot down by the Soviet Union.

== Welch's The Politician ==
Republican criticism of the John Birch Society intensified after Welch circulated a letter in 1954 calling President Dwight D. Eisenhower a possible "dedicated, conscious agent of the Communist conspiracy". Welch went further in a book titled The Politician, written in 1956 and privately printed, rather than by the JBS, for Welch in 1963.

It was his personal "fact-finding" mission and was not part of the materials or the formal beliefs of the JBS. Welch claimed President Franklin D. Roosevelt had known about the Japanese attack on Pearl Harbor in advance but said nothing because he wanted to get the U.S. into the war. The book spawned much debate in the 1960s over whether the author really intended to call Eisenhower a Communist. G. Edward Griffin, a friend of Welch, claims that he meant collectivist, not Communist. The charge's sensationalism led many conservatives and Republicans to shy away from the group.

== Political views ==
Welch accused Presidents Truman and Eisenhower of being communist sympathizers and possibly Soviet agents of influence. He alleged that Eisenhower was a "dedicated, conscious agent of the communist conspiracy", and that Eisenhower's brother Milton was the President's superior in the communist apparatus.

According to Princeton University historian Sean Wilentz, "Wherever he looked, Welch saw Communist forces manipulating American economic and foreign policy on behalf of totalitarianism. But within the United States, he believed, the subversion had actually begun years before the Bolshevik Revolution. Conflating modern liberalism and totalitarianism, Welch described government as 'always and inevitably an enemy of individual freedom.'"

"Consequently, he charged, the Progressive era, which expanded the federal government's role in curbing social and economic ills, was a dire period in our history, and Woodrow Wilson 'more than any other one man started this nation on its present road to totalitarianism' ... In the 1960s, Welch became convinced that even the Communist movement was but 'a tool of the total conspiracy.'"

"This master conspiracy, he said, had forerunners in ancient Sparta, and sprang fully to life in the 18th century, in the 'uniformly Satanic creed and program' of the Bavarian Illuminati. Run by those he called 'the Insiders', the conspiracy resided chiefly in international families of financiers, such as the Rothschilds and the Rockefellers, government agencies like the Federal Reserve System and the Internal Revenue Service, and nongovernmental organizations like the Bilderberg Group, the Council on Foreign Relations, and the Trilateral Commission."

== Personal life ==
Welch met his future wife Marian Probert Welch while a college student; she attended Wellesley College. The couple had two sons, Hillard, and Robert. Welch died on January 6, 1985.

== Works ==
- May God Forgive Us: A Famous Letter Giving the Historical Background of the Dismissal of General MacArthur (1952). Henry Regnery Company.
- Again, May God Forgive Us! (1952). Belmont, Mass.: Belmont Publishing Company.
- The Blue Book of The John Birch Society (1959). Belmont, Mass.: Western Islands. ISBN 0882791052. Full text.
- The Life of John Birch: In the Story of One American Boy, the Ordeal of His Age (1960). Belmont, Mass.: Western Islands. ISBN 0882791168.
- The Politician: A Look at the Political Forces that Propelled Dwight David Eisenhower into the Presidency. Appleton, Wis.: Robert Welch University Press (1963).
- The New Americanism: And Other Speeches and Essays (1966). Belmont, Mass.: Western Islands. ISBN 978-0882792118. OCLC 7351053.
- The Romance of Education (1973). Boston: Western Islands. OCLC 667776.

== See also ==
- Robert Welch University
- Deep state
