= William F. Jasper =

American journalist and author

William F. Jasper is an American far-right political author currently serving as president of the John Birch Society, as well as senior editor of The New American, the JBS's magazine. He has been labeled a conspiracy theorist or associated with conspiratorial thinking by various academics and watchdog organizations.

== Beginnings ==
William F. Jasper grew up in Orofino, Idaho and, with his wife Carmen, has two children.

In 1976, Jasper joined the John Birch Society as a researcher. Soon he began to write for its magazines, American Opinion and The Review of the News. When they merged in 1985 he continued working under their successor The New American, becoming a senior editor in 1990. By 1997 he was cited in Valparaiso University Law Review for his Oklahoma City Bombing conspiracies.

== Beliefs ==
=== Far-Right Political Commentary ===
==== International Relations ====
University of Missouri-St. Louis Professor Susan Brownell cited Jasper as an example of far-right criticism of China's representation in media, having claimed NBC's coverage of the 2008 Olympics in Beijing was too closely coordinated with the government. Similarly, political scientist Dr. Marlene Wind presented Jasper as a far-right critic of the International Criminal Court, believing it undermined United States sovereignty despite the country not participating in the treaty. Religious Professor Steven Rockefeller cited Jasper and The New American as one of the groups criticizing the Earth Charter for "promoting Pantheism and Earth worship."

==== United States Conservatism ====
Jasper openly disparages the neoconservative movement and describes William F. Buckley Jr. as one of the figures who had "taken over the Republican Party." Former United States president George H. W. Bush, a Republican, was considered to be enacting the JBS's "worst fears". He generally supports the United States Militia Movement while distinguishing between those he considers law-abiding and those that act violent, repudiating the Ku Klux Klan in particular. Opposing gun control, Jasper blames the Columbine High School Shooting on increasing secularization in society and views Christianity as a viable solution.

=== Conspiracy & Bigotry ===
Since at least 1988 Jasper considered undocumented migration at the U.S. Southern border to be an "invasion". In April 2024 he argued that queer couples took opportunities to adopt away from heterosexual Christians. Director Samantha Power of the Carr Center for Human Rights Policy wrote that Jasper was an "extremist" who used "the race card" by arguing anyone defending property during what he called a "race riot" could be charged with Genocide under international law.

Religious scholar Prof. David Chidester denoted Jasper as a conspiracy theorist outright for his association of Cecil Rhodes and Bill Clinton. In the context of what legal scholar Mark Fenster deemed the John Burch Society's "Christian Constitutionalist" advocacy, Jasper's articles seemed directed against some "conspiratorial elite that controls the federal government." In 1999 Dr. Isaac Kfir posited in his doctoral thesis that Jasper's beliefs involved "postwar liberalism, the United Nations, the liberal Eastern Establishment and the Soviet Union" working in tandem to undermine the United States. A few years later communications professor Charles Stewart would analyze Jasper's perspective as part of the general JBS ideology, elaborating further on how it integrated the Soviet collapse and adapted accordingly. In 2020 historian Barbara Keys cited Jasper as an example of JBS writers claiming "the Council on Foreign Relations" worked "with the Bill & Melinda Gates Foundation, former Obama officials, and the WTO" to enact socialism in the United States.

Professors Mark Baron and Floyd Boschee, in discussing opposition to outcome-based education from conservative religious groups, wrote that Jasper went even further by suggesting "OBE is part of a conspiracy to restructure America's traditional system of values." He is also written to have viewed the 1988 "Act for Better Child Care Services" as playing a role in "the disintegration" of traditional family.

== Reception ==
His writings have been associated with the general ideology of the John Birch Society and The New American as a whole, organizations considered by the Southern Poverty Law Center to be far-right and conspiratorial. The SPLC similarly listed him as a speaker for a regional event they deemed a gathering for "Conspiracy theorists and lawmakers", which the JBS participated organizationally as well. His essay criticizing the increase of queer representation appeared in university textbooks as an example of a writer who "assumes that his audience" already considers part of their argument, in this case the assumption being that readers already harbor negative attitudes toward queer people.

University of Hartford Professor Robert Churchill referred readers of his book to Jasper for his "attempt" at dispelling rumors surrounding the Christian Patriot movement. Tara Tuchscherer of the Lewiston Morning Tribune reported that after covering the Oklahoma City Bombing, Jasper was bringing in thousands of new subscribers to The New American.

=== Public Responses ===
In 2002 he had a brief editorial exchange with Prof. Steven Rockefeller over Jasper's reporting of the Earth Charter, which Rockefeller helped draft and Jasper condemned. In 2003 the University of Florida's Florida Philosophical Review published an article titled "Jasper’s Kangaroo Court of International Injustice: A Response" by Eric Smaw, later a professor at Rollins College.

== Works ==
Cenage Learning has published Jasper's essays on a variety of topics through Gale and Greenhaven Press for educational usage.

=== Books ===
- Global Tyranny-Step by Step: The United Nations and the Emerging New World Order. Appleton, Wisconsin: Western Islands, December 1992. ISBN 0-88279-135-4 LCCN 92-81764. 350 pages. Bibliography available.
- The United Nations Exposed: The Internationalist Conspiracy to Rule the World. Appleton, Wisconsin: John Birch Society, 2001. ISBN 978-1881919049 OCLC 226043056. 338 pages.
