= Charlottesville car attack =

2017 terrorist attack in the United States

Coordinates: 38°01′46.17″N 78°28′46.29″W

- Part of the Unite the Right rally
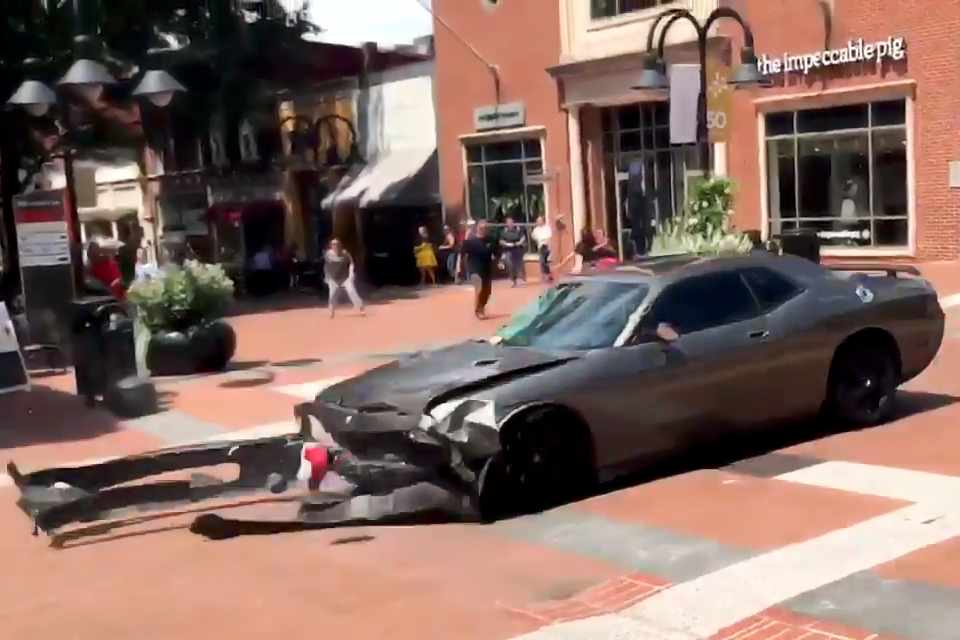
- Fields driving his car away immediately after the attack
- Location: Southern half of the Downtown Mall, Charlottesville, Virginia
- Date: August 12, 2017; 9 years ago c. 1:45 p.m. (UTC-4)
- Target: Crowd counter-protesting Unite the Right rally
- Attack type: Vehicle-ramming attack, domestic terrorism, murder, attempted mass murder
- Weapon: 2010 Dodge Challenger
- Deaths: 1 (Heather Danielle Heyer)
- Injuries: 35
- Perpetrator: James Alex Fields Jr.
- Motive: Neo-Nazism; White supremacy
- Charges: Racially motivated violent interference with a federally protected activity (dropped after plea deal)
- Verdict: Federal verdict: Pleaded guilty State verdict: Guilty on all counts
- Convictions: Federal convictions: Hate crime act resulting in death; Hate crime act that caused bodily injury involving an attempt to kill (28 counts); State convictions: First-degree murder; Malicious wounding (8 counts); Aggravated malicious wounding (5 counts); Felonious assault (2 counts); Leaving the scene of an accident
- Sentence: Federal sentence: Life imprisonment without the possibility of parole State sentence: Life imprisonment without the possibility of parole plus 419 years
- Litigation: Fields ordered to pay $12 million

The Charlottesville car attack was a white supremacist terrorist attack perpetrated on August 12, 2017, when James Alex Fields Jr. deliberately drove his car into a crowd of people protesting the Unite the Right rally in Charlottesville, Virginia, killing one person and injuring 35. Fields, who was 20 at the time, had previously espoused neo-Nazi and white supremacist beliefs, and drove from Ohio to attend the rally.

Fields's attack was called an act of domestic terrorism by the mayor of Charlottesville, Virginia's public safety secretary, the U.S. attorney general, and the director of the FBI.

Fields was convicted in a state court of the first-degree murder of 32-year-old Heather Heyer, eight counts of malicious wounding, and hit and run. He also pled guilty to 29 of 30 federal hate crime charges to avoid the death penalty. He was sentenced to life in prison plus 419 years for the state charges, with an additional life sentence for the federal charges.

== Background and attack ==
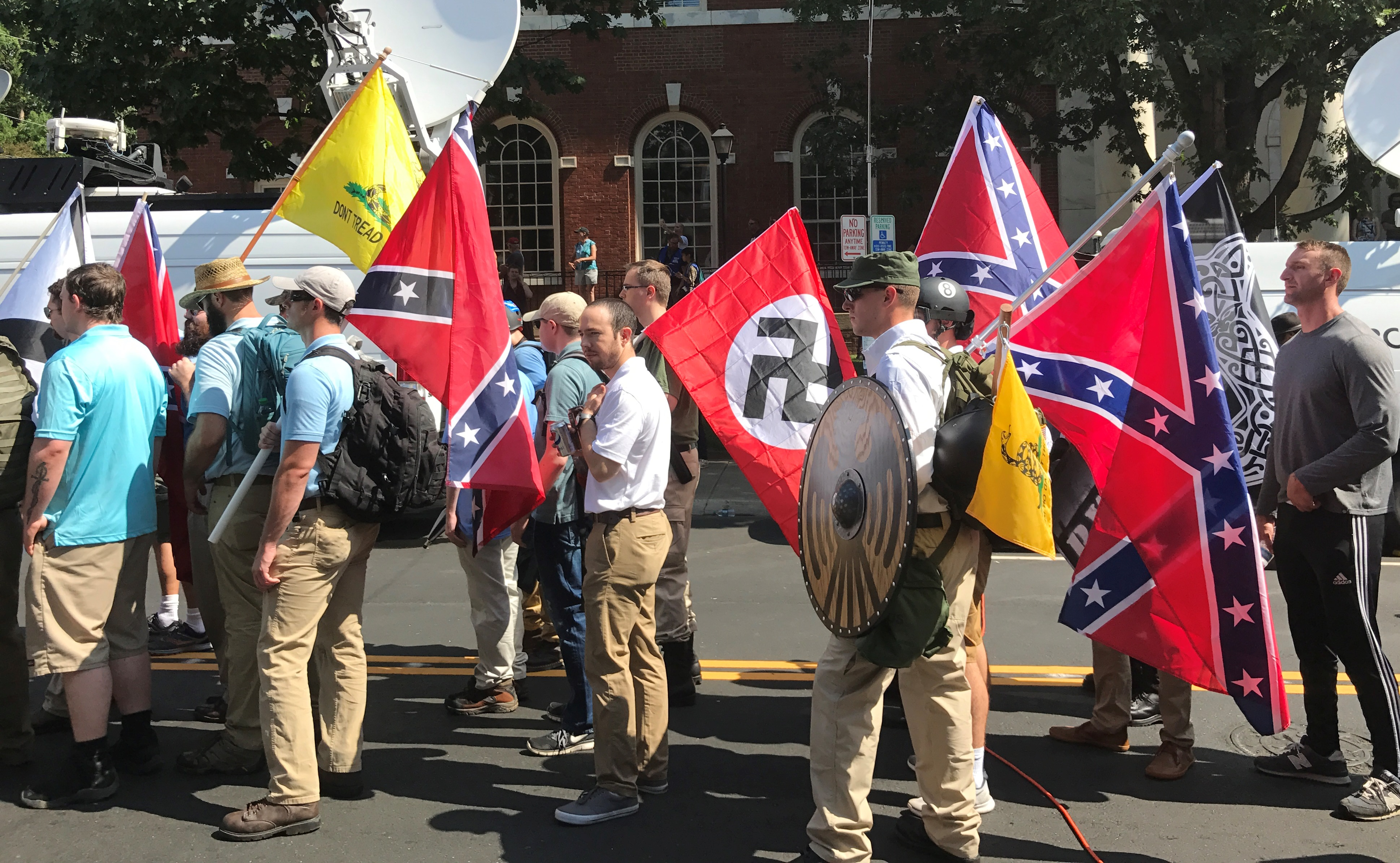
Rally participants prepare to enter Emancipation Park in Charlottesville, Virginia, on August 12, 2017. They carry Confederate battle flags, Gadsden flags, and a Nazi flag.

The Unite the Right rally was a white supremacist rally that occurred in Charlottesville, Virginia from August 11 to 12, 2017. Jason Kessler, the organizer of the rally, had been protesting for months against the proposed removal of a statue of Confederate General Robert E. Lee in Emancipation Park in Charlottesville.

The August rally had been preceded by a Ku Klux Klan rally in Charlottesville on July 8, 2017. That motivated many concerned local residents to ally with activist protesters against the white supremacists' rally the next month.

Individuals and groups of different beliefs and tactics participated in a demonstration against the rally. Many counter-protesters turned out despite the potential threat of violence. Protesters and some militant counter-protesters attacked each other. According to a police report, on Saturday, August 12, 2017, "A school resource officer stationed at the intersection of 4th Street NE and Market Street was reassigned," after she radioed for assistance following "'violent skirmishes' breaking out causing her to feel unsafe." However, she was not replaced, thus leaving the intersection without a police presence.

According to the report, "unknown persons" displaced a sawhorse barricade set up to block traffic from moving down 4th Street South-East, away from the Downtown Mall—a pedestrian area spanning eight blocks along Main Street—toward East Water Street. Fields was driving south along Fourth Street behind two other drivers, Lizete Short and Tadrint "Tay" Washington, when they were impeded by a large group of counter-protesters heading towards Market Street. All three initially stopped their vehicles, a silver 2010 Dodge Challenger coupe, a maroon Honda Odyssey minivan, a silver Toyota Camry sedan, respectively. Fields then backed up over a block, idling for a moment on the other side of Downtown Mall (Main Street), still facing towards the crowd further down Fourth Street.

Video footage of the attack taken by Brennan Gilmore

At around 1:45 p.m. on August 12, 2017, Fields revved the engine of the Dodge Challenger and accelerated rapidly towards the crowd of counter-protesters and the two other vehicles. Fields rammed his vehicle into pedestrians "with an audible thud," the impact reportedly sending people "flying through the air" over another car near the intersection of Fourth and Water streets. A police crash reconstructionist estimated Fields reached a top speed of 28 miles per hour (45 km/h) before the crash. Fields's car then struck Washington's stationary Toyota at an estimated 23 miles per hour (37 km/h), accelerating Washington and her car to 17.1 miles per hour (27.5 km/h) in 150 milliseconds (0.15 s). The struck vehicle also hit the maroon minivan ahead, "sending that vehicle into more pedestrians," including its driver Short, who had stepped out to record the protest. Seconds after the initial impact, Fields reversed his vehicle back up Fourth Street, striking more people in the process, his car's front bumper now dislodged and scraping the road. People who had avoided the attack chased after Fields and his vehicle.

After backing up at a high speed for several blocks, Fields then turned left and sped down Market Street. A Virginia State Police Bell 407 helicopter, which crashed about three hours later, followed the car and relayed its route to ground units. A deputy stopped and arrested Fields on Monticello Avenue, about 1 mile (1.6 km) from the attack. The deputy waited for backup to arrive, and detective Steven Young came from the police department. According to Young, Fields kept apologizing and asked if anyone was injured. When Young told him that a person had died, Fields appeared shocked and started to cry. Young said that the Dodge had holes in the rear window and heavy front-end damage; Young said that the car was "splattered" with blood and flesh. A reusable water bottle was lodged against the windshield and a pair of blue sunglasses were stuck in the spoiler on the car's trunk.

=== Immediate aftermath ===
Heather Heyer, a 32-year-old woman, was fatally injured in the attack, and died at the University of Virginia Medical Center. Initially, 19 injuries were reported, as 20 patients were taken at the University of Virginia Medical Center. In the evening, five people were in critical condition and 14 others were being treated for lesser injuries. Nine people had been discharged and ten remained hospitalized in good condition the next day. Testimony at the preliminary hearing in December 2017 revealed that a total of 35 people were injured.

The organizer of the Unite the Right rally, Jason Kessler, held a news conference near the Charlottesville City Hall the day after the car attack. A crowd of around 100 counter-protesters shouted him down, screaming "murderer." In February 2018, three were found guilty of assaulting Kessler at the news conference and a case against a person charged with spitting on Kessler was continued until February 2019 at the request of the prosecution.

== Perpetrator ==
James Alex Fields Jr. (born April 26, 1997) drove the car.

Fields's father had been killed in a car crash on December 5, 1996, five months before he was born. Fields was born in Kenton, Kentucky, and grew up with his mother, Samantha Bloom, who was paraplegic, in Florence, Kentucky. After living in southwest Florence for ten years, Bloom and Fields moved to Monclova Township, Lucas County, Ohio, for her job in late 2016.

According to Fields' high-school history teacher, Derek Weimer, Fields was diagnosed with schizophrenia and prescribed an antipsychotic medication for anger management. Fields later told a judge that he was receiving treatment for bipolar disorder, anxiety, depression, and attention deficit hyperactivity disorder (ADHD). His attorneys also brought up his difficult upbringing and history of mental illness ahead of his sentencing. It was highlighted by his lawyers that he was brought up by a single paraplegic mother and suffered from trauma growing up knowing that his Jewish grandfather murdered his grandmother before committing suicide.

Until his arrest in Charlottesville, Fields worked for about two years as a security guard in Ohio. Fields's mother told the Toledo Blade that he had "recently moved out on his own." According to acquaintances, Fields "filled his time" playing video games and working at a local grocery store.

=== Biography ===
Fields threatened his mother with violence on multiple occasions. In November 2010, she locked herself in a bathroom, afraid of her son. She told the police that he took her phone, struck her head, put his hands over her mouth, and threatened to beat her after she told him to stop playing video games.

In February 2011, Fields's mother reported to the police at 5:20 a.m. that he had not come home; she said that he was wearing a T-shirt and shorts. Two hours later, she reported to the police that Fields "was home and acting lethargic;" he threatened to run away "if police came to the condo." In October 2011, Fields threatened her with a 12-inch (30 cm) knife; she called the police the next day to say that her son had been "very threatening" toward her and that she was scared and did not feel in control of the situation because she was in a wheelchair. In November 2011, Fields spat in his mother's face and threatened her, and a woman requested that the police help Fields's mother get him to a hospital for assessment; the log for the call reads, "Mom is scared he is going to become violent here." Fields was subsequently arrested and held in juvenile detention.

When he was a senior in high school, Fields applied to join the U.S. Army. Weimer, his history teacher and a former Ohio National Guard officer, helped him because Weimer believed that the military "would expose Fields to people of different races and backgrounds and help him dispel his white supremacist views." Fields was eventually rejected, which Weimer called a "big blow."

Fields graduated from Randall K. Cooper High School in 2015.

Fields entered the Army on August 18, 2015, and was released from active duty "due to a failure to meet training standards" on December 11 the same year. Army spokeswoman Lt. Col. Jennifer Johnson said that Fields "was never awarded a military occupational skill nor was he assigned to a unit outside of basic training." Weimer lost contact with Fields after he had graduated and was "surprised" when he heard that Fields had managed to enlist in the army.

Fields purchased his first car, the 2010 Dodge Challenger used in the attack, from a car dealership in Florence, Kentucky, in June 2015. The car was last registered in Ohio, and Fields updated its title in Maumee, Ohio, in July 2015. In May 2017, local court records show, the Maumee police cited him for expired or unlawful license plates.

=== Ideology ===
An ex-schoolmate of Fields said that Fields would draw swastikas and talk about "loving Hitler" as early as middle school. Fields' high school history teacher said that Fields was "deeply into Adolf Hitler and white supremacy". The teacher, Derek Weimer, reportedly taught Fields in three classes at Randall K. Cooper High School and "had regular interaction with him after classes and during free time". He told The Cincinnati Enquirer, "I'm sure if you would ask James he would say I was his favorite or one of his favorite teachers." Weimer said that Fields was "a very bright kid but very misguided and disillusioned". Weimer said, "Once you talked to James for a while, you would start to see that sympathy towards Nazism, that idolization of Hitler, that belief in white supremacy. It would start to creep out."

Weimer said that he had done his best to steer Fields away from those interests and had thought that he had succeeded in doing so. He said that he felt like he failed as a teacher because of the attack, but that "this is definitely a teachable moment and something we need to be vigilant about, because this stuff is tearing up our country". Weimer said that another teacher had filed a report during Fields' freshman year because he had written something that was "very much along the party lines of the neo-Nazi movement". He said that it "would have been standard procedure" to notify Fields' mother and that the school administrators "were very good about keeping parents in the loop".

According to Weimer, Fields "left school for a while" and became quieter about politics when he came back, until his senior year, when the candidates for the 2016 presidential election were declared. Weimer said that Fields supported Donald Trump because of what he perceived were Trump's racial views. According to Weimer, Fields supported Trump's Mexico border proposal. Weimer said that Fields "admired" the Confederate States of America for their military, though he "never spoke about slavery". Weimer said that "the constant presence of the Confederate flag was an ongoing issue" and that an African-American cheerleader was "very uncomfortable having to ride in a parade being carried by a pickup truck with a large Confederate flag sticker".

Fields reportedly made students feel "unnerved" and "unsafe," and one woman told The New York Times, "On many occasions there were times he would scream obscenities, whether it be about Hitler or racial slurs." Keegan McGrath, Fields's roommate on a class trip to Europe in 2015 told the Associated Press that Fields went on the trip only to visit Germany, and referred to it as the Fatherland. He could not handle being in a room with Fields after Fields spoke about French people "being lower than us and inferior to us". Fields voted in the March 15, 2016, Ohio Republican primary.

A lot of boys get interested in the Germans and Nazis because they're interested in World War II. But James took it to another level. He researched everything and had an intellectual argument for all his points, which is something you just don't see that often.

— Derek Weimer, The Cincinnati Enquirer

Fields' mother said that he had a pet cat, and that she was taking care of it during the rally. She did not know that her son was attending a white supremacist rally; instead, she thought that he was attending a Trump rally. She told him "to be careful, and if they're going to rally to make sure he's doing it peacefully". She said that she "would be surprised if her son's views were so far right that he would attend a white supremacist rally" and that he had an African-American friend. She told the Toledo Blade that she had not spoken with her son about his political views. Fields's Facebook page included memes and symbols associated with the far right. At the Unite the Right rally, the morning of the attack, Fields was seen wielding a Vanguard America shield. Vanguard America, a neo-Nazi organization, stated that it was not associated with Fields.

== Victims ==
Thirty-five people were injured in the incident, at least eight of whom sustained permanent and significant physical impairment.

Heather Heyer

Heather Danielle Heyer (May 29, 1985 – August 12, 2017) was the only person killed in the attack.

Heyer grew up in Ruckersville, Virginia, and graduated from William Monroe High School in Stanardsville, Virginia. She worked as a paralegal, bartender and waitress. She was approached by Alfred A. Wilson, the manager of the bankruptcy division at the Miller Law Group in Charlottesville. Heyer did not have a background in law; Wilson hired her at the recommendation of a friend and said that she "had an eye for detail" and was "a people person". He reportedly told her, "If you can get people to open up to you, that's what I need. I'll teach you everything about the law you need to know." She continued her job as a waitress while working at the law firm. Wilson said that Heyer did not take any vacations during her first two years at Miller Law Group. She left her boyfriend after he made a racist comment about Wilson.

Heyer lived alone. Her friends described her "as a passionate advocate for the disenfranchised who was often moved to tears by the world's injustices", and said that she "spoke out against inequality and urged co-workers to be active in their community". According to her mother, Susan Bro, Heyer would ask people of opposing views why they had come to their beliefs. Bro said that they both advocated for Black Lives Matter, which Bro said fights for equal treatment.

If you're not outraged, you're not paying attention.

— Heather Heyer, her last post published on Facebook

Heyer and a longtime friend of hers had agreed not to protest the rally, because they thought it would be too dangerous, but the night before the protests, she felt compelled to go.

== Legal proceedings ==
=== Federal investigation and trial ===
As investigations were launched into the attack, a Department of Justice official said that federal hate crime charges could be applied to the case.

On August 12, the Justice Department (DOJ) announced a joint civil rights investigation into the incident conducted by the Justice Department's Civil Rights Division, the Federal Bureau of Investigation (FBI) and the U.S. Attorney for the Western District of Virginia. NPR's Carrie Johnson reported that investigators wanted to know whether Fields had crossed state lines with the intent to commit violence. A Department of Justice official said that they would "investigate whether others may have been involved in planning the attack." Lisa Monaco, Homeland Security Advisor to President Barack Obama, raised the question of whether the attack would be investigated as domestic terrorism. Attorney General Jeff Sessions said on Good Morning America on August 14 that the attack met the definition of domestic terrorism. Attorney General Jeff Sessions said that civil rights division FBI agents and FBI terrorism investigators were working on the case. FBI Director Christopher A. Wray said that the attack met the definition of domestic terrorism.

You can be sure we will charge and advance the investigation towards the most serious charges that can be brought because this is unequivocally an unacceptable, evil attack.

— Attorney General Jeff Sessions, Good Morning America (2017)

On June 27, 2018, as reported by the DOJ's Office of Public Affairs, a W.D. Va. federal grand jury charged Fields under two hate crime statutes with multiple federal hate crimes:

- 1 count of a hate crime act resulting in the death of Heather Heyer (18 U.S.C. § 249)
- 28 counts of hate crime acts causing bodily injury and involving an attempt to kill (18 U.S.C. § 249)
- 1 count of racially motivated violent interference with a federally protected activity (18 U.S.C. § 245(b)(2)) — resulting in the death of Heather Heyer, for driving his car into a crowd of protestors on a downtown street in Charlottesville, Virginia.

Attorney General Jeff Sessions said of the indictment, "Last summer's violence in Charlottesville cut short a promising young life and shocked the nation. Today's indictment should send a clear message to every would-be criminal in America that we aggressively prosecute violent crimes of hate that threaten the core principles of our nation." W.D. Va. Attorney Thomas T. Cullen called the indictment "the culmination of a 10-month investigation that involved searching the social media accounts where Mr. Fields showed an interest in harming minorities." Adam S. Lee, the special agent in charge of the FBI's Richmond Division, said, "Heyer did not go to the event looking for a fight. She was looking to lend her voice to her cause. Peaceful protest without intimidation, without the threat of violence is every American's birthright."

On July 5, 2018, Fields pleaded not guilty to all 30 counts of federal hate crime charges. On March 27, 2019, Fields altered his plea. Having originally pleaded not guilty on all charges, this was changed to guilty on 29 of 30 hate crime charges. It was speculated that this plea bargain was taken to avoid the possibility of the death penalty, as the option of capital punishment was removed from his potential sentence as a result of the alteration. In addition, Heyer's mother stated that she opposed the death penalty option and did not want Fields to die, saying, "There's no point in killing him. It would not bring back Heather." For the hate crime convictions, Fields was sentenced to life in prison on June 28, 2019.

=== State investigation and trial ===
Fields was initially charged with one count of second-degree murder, three counts of malicious wounding, and one count of hit and run. Fields appeared in court on August 14, via video from jail, and was denied bail. Fields said that he could not afford a lawyer; a private attorney was appointed by the judge, as a public defender could not be appointed due to a conflict of interest (a person linked to the public defender's office had been injured in the crash). By August 17, he was represented by Denise Y. Lunsford, replacing Charles L. Weber. The next hearing for Fields was set for August 25.

On August 19, Fields was charged with two additional counts of malicious wounding, and three counts of aggravated malicious wounding. Charlottesville Police Lieutenant Steve Upman said in a release, "The victims related to these charges suffered serious injuries and in some cases permanent physical disabilities." The investigation remained under the Charlottesville police, the FBI and the DOJ. It was also reported on August 19 that the FBI had been attempting to identify individuals who were near Fields a few minutes before the attack, and that the city police had stated multiple times that Fourth Street Southeast had not been "supposed to be open at that time" and that they were "still investigating how the street was opened and why vehicles were directed toward it."

At the preliminary hearing in December 2017, State District Court Judge Robert H. Downer Jr. certified all ten charges to proceed. The certified charges were one count of first-degree murder, three counts of malicious wounding, three counts of aggravated malicious wounding, two counts of felonious assault and one count of hit and run. Video footage of the surveying helicopter and surveillance video footage from a restaurant near the mall crossing were shown. Surveillance video footage from the restaurant reportedly showed the Dodge Challenger zooming past "a string of vehicles" heading south on Fourth Street Southeast.

On January 3, 2018, Fields waived his right to a speedy trial, and his trial was scheduled to begin on November 26, 2018, and lasted three weeks. On December 7, Fields was found guilty of first-degree murder, hit and run, and eight counts of malicious wounding. On December 11, the jury recommended life in prison for the killing of Heather Heyer along with an additional 419 years for the other crimes committed: 70 years for each of five malicious wounding charges, 20 for each of three malicious wounding charges, and nine years on one charge of leaving the scene of an accident. On July 15, 2019, Fields was given a second life sentence for the murder of Heyer, with an additional 419 years for the other crimes.

=== Civil trial ===
Fields was one of the defendants in Sines v. Kessler, a civil trial against various organizers, promoters, and participants in the Unite the Right rally. On November 23, 2021, jurors awarded $12 million in damages against Fields, who they found liable for assault and battery and intentional infliction of harm. Jurors also found that Fields, along with all other defendants, had engaged in civil conspiracy under Virginia state law. Total damages in the suit, including those against Fields, totaled approximately $25 million.

=== Incarceration ===
In February 2023, Fields was accused of threatening a prison officer and brandishing a weapon in what was described as a "series of incidents". At the time, Fields was serving his sentence at MCFP Springfield. Prosecutors requested that Fields should have to pay $650 from his inmate account, while Fields asked that he only be required to pay $298. In these court filings, prosecutors revealed that Fields was paying his restitution at a rate of $100 per year, with a total of $81,600 owed in restitution. As of February 2023, victims had not received any restitution payments from Fields in the four years that he had been incarcerated.

== Reactions ==
=== Memorial service ===
A memorial service was held at the Paramount Theater, two blocks from the attack location, on August 16. More than a thousand people attended the service, many of them wearing sashes and ribbons. Present were Governor Terry McAuliffe (D-VA), Senator Tim Kaine (D-VA), Lt. Gov. Ralph Northam (D-VA) and former Counselor to the President Ed Gillespie (R-VA).

Heyer's mother Susan Bro delivered a speech calling for people to fight "as Heather would do." A standing ovation lasted nearly a minute and a half after Bro said, "They tried to kill my child to shut her up, but guess what, you just magnified her." Bro said that she had received hundreds of messages from people inspired by Heyer asking for advice. A woman played "Amazing Grace" and "America the Beautiful" on a saxophone. Heyer's father Mark Heyer said that Heather had been "defiant, strong-willed and compassionate" and that she "always argued for what she thought was right."

Several people with purple shields, pink bats and pink helmets with a heart drawn on each were observing outside the theater to stop any "fascist groups" that might disrupt the event. No problems were reported outside the theater. As the service ended, Bro asked someone in the audience to stop criticizing President Trump.

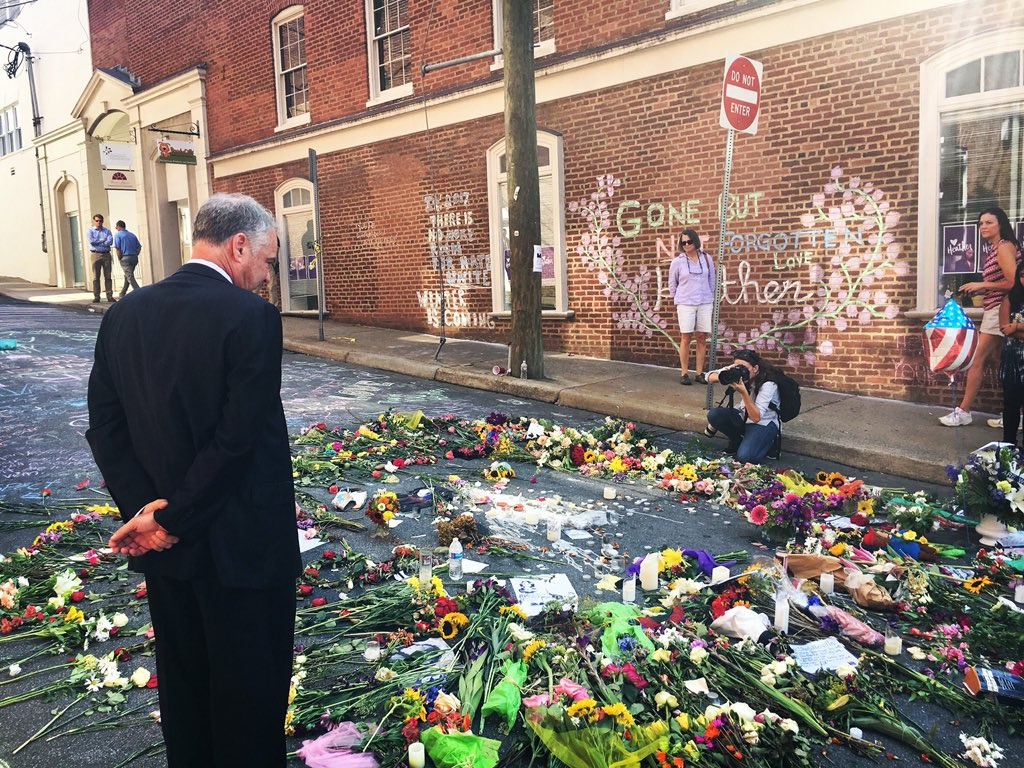
Senator Tim Kaine of Virginia visits a makeshift memorial to Heather Heyer at the site of the attack.

Politicians were confronted outside the memorial service. After being asked about it, McAuliffe told a man that Virginia law leaves the removal of Confederate statues to local communities. Kaine was asked why the Charlottesville police "had failed to head off the weekend's violent clashes" and he said that, "city officials had promised an independent review of the police response."

=== Vigils ===
A vigil in remembrance of Heyer was planned for August 13 night, but was cancelled due to a "credible threat from white supremacists." People gathered and prayed at the site of the attack in spite of the cancellation.

Hundreds of people gathered at the University of Virginia and in other U.S. cities, including Philadelphia and Akron, Ohio.

=== Randall K. Cooper High School ===
Michael Wilson, Principal of the Randall K. Cooper High School that Fields had attended, said: "As educators, we are always using teachable moments and providing guidance to students to create college, career and life ready students to make good and sound choices. ... We're all educators and we all are reflecting on what did we miss, or what could we do better. We do that with any student who may have made a wrong choice." He said that his staff sent thoughts and prayers to Charlottesville. Wilson said that the faculty members were worried about the victims and concerned about Fields.

And there are others like him out there – we as a society have to do a better job of figuring out how to reach them. This isn't something that happens overnight ... it builds up over time and we need to pay more attention to this.

— Derek Weimer, Fields's history teacher at the Cooper High School, The Cincinnati Enquirer

Principal Wilson called Fields a "quiet and reserved student." Fields was described as "shy" and "quiet" by his ex-classmates and neighbors. A woman who went to school with Fields told The New York Times that he "mostly kept to himself" and "didn't start fights or try to fight," but described him as "exceptionally odd and an outcast to be sure." However, Fields's roommate on a class trip to Europe in 2015 told the Associated Press, "He had friends, he had people who would chat with him, it wasn't like he was an outcast."

Boone County Schools spokeswoman Barbara Brady said that school officials "were not aware of any situation at Cooper High regarding Fields's behavior at the time of his enrollment." Brady questioned the trustworthiness of reports by Fields's ex-classmates, criticizing them for not reporting incidents.

This is something I'm guilty of, too, I kind of brushed it off as just creepy. We thought it was all talk. No one ever thought he would do something so violent.

— An ex-schoolmate, The Cincinnati Enquirer

=== Public officials ===
The city of Charlottesville and its City Council published a statement: "This senseless act of violence rips a hole in our collective hearts. While it will never make up for the loss of a member of our community, we will pursue charges against the driver of the vehicle that caused her death and are confident justice will prevail." Mayor Michael Signer called the attack domestic terrorism and blamed white supremacists. In a statement on August 18, Mayor Michael Signer called on the City Council to "take concrete steps to memorialize Heather's name and legacy." Signer asked the governor to convene an emergency General Assembly session to allow Charlottesville to remove the statue of Robert E. Lee.

Brian Moran, the Virginia Secretary of Public Safety, said, "He was a terrorist to do what he did."

Attorney General Jeff Sessions said in a statement, "The violence and deaths in Charlottesville strike at the heart of American law and justice. When such actions arise from racial bigotry and hatred, they betray our core values and cannot be tolerated. Justice will prevail."

On August 17, White House Deputy Press Secretary Lindsay Walters said that Trump would meet with Heyer's family.

==== President Trump ====
Donald J. Trump
(@realDonaldTrump)
tweeted:

Condolences to the family of the young woman killed today, and best regards to all of those injured, in Charlottesville, Virginia. So sad!

August 13, 2017

Donald J. Trump
(@realDonaldTrump)
tweeted:

Memorial service today for beautiful and incredible Heather Heyer, a truly special young woman. She will be long remembered by all!

August 16, 2017

U.S. President Donald Trump praised Heyer as "an incredible young woman." Heyer's mother Susan Bro thanked Trump for his August 14 remarks on the event. She wrote in a statement: "Thank you, President Trump, for those words of comfort and for denouncing those who promote violence and hatred. My condolences, also, to the grieving families of the two state troopers and quick recovery for those injured."

In an August 15 statement, widely condemned as endorsing white supremacists, Trump said:

I think there is blame on both sides. You look at, you look at both sides. I think there's blame on both sides, and I have no doubt about it...you also had people that were very fine people on both sides.

In the same conference Trump clarified what he meant by "fine people":

I'm not talking about the neo-Nazis and white nationalists because they should be condemned totally.

Also on August 15, Trump said about Bro's statement on Trump's August 14 statement:

I thought that the statement put out, the mother's statement, I thought was a beautiful statement. I'll tell you, it was something that I really appreciated. I thought it was terrific. And really, under the kind of stress that she's under, and the heartache she's under, I thought putting out that statement to me was really something I won't forget. Thank you all very much. Thank you.

Bro initially declined to respond to Trump's August 15 statement as she was busy and tired. After Bro saw Trump's August 15 statement, she said that she would not talk to Trump.

Trump tweeted about the memorial service the morning of the day that it occurred. No Trump administration officials were present at the service.

=== White nationalists ===
Jason Kessler, the organizer of the Unite the Right rally, said that none of the organizers knew Fields. After being unable to hold a press conference due to violence, he accused the city of "shutting down" speech and said that the city officials "failed to separate the protest groups and were ill-equipped to handle the melee that resulted." White supremacist rally speaker Richard B. Spencer placed the blame for the attack on authorities, who "failed to keep order." Spencer refused to condemn Fields, saying, "This man could have lost control because he felt in danger and slammed on the accelerator and unintentionally killed someone."

On August 18, 2017, Kessler tweeted that Heyer "was a fat, disgusting Communist. Communists have killed 94 million. Looks like it was payback time." Kessler deleted the tweet the next day, initially saying he was hacked, but later claiming he had been on a mixture of drugs. Other white nationalists criticized Kessler for the tweet, including Richard Spencer, who wrote: "I will no longer associate w/ Jason Kessler; no one should. Heyer's death was deeply saddening. 'Payback' is a morally reprehensible idea."

Other white supremacists, such as James Allsup and Andrew Auernheimer, went on to claim that Heyer's death was the result of a weight-related heart attack, a conspiracy theory which stemmed from a statement by Susan Bro in an NBC News interview and was pushed by white supremacist media outlets such as Occidental Dissent and The Daily Stormer, the latter which had its services suspended by their domain registrar following a blog post mocking Heyer.

Other debunked claims and conspiracy theories suggested that a Michigan man was driving the car during the ramming; that Fields was under assault and acted in self-defense, and that a protester threatened Fields with an AR-15 rifle before the attack. Lawyer Mark Fenster said those conspiracy theories were "part of a self-sustaining narrative created by white nationalists who might be worried that the violence that took place delegitimized their cause."

=== Heyer's family members ===
Heyer's mother Susan Bro said that she did not want people to hate Fields. She said that it was not what her daughter would have wanted.

Heyer's father urged people to "stop the hate" and said he was proud of her for taking a stand to help others. He expressed he had forgiven his daughter's killer, saying that "My thoughts with all of this stuff are that people need to stop hating and they need to forgive each other. I include myself in that forgiving the guy that did this. He doesn't know [any] better. I just think about what the Lord said on the cross. Lord, forgive them. They don't know what they're doing."

== Aftermath ==
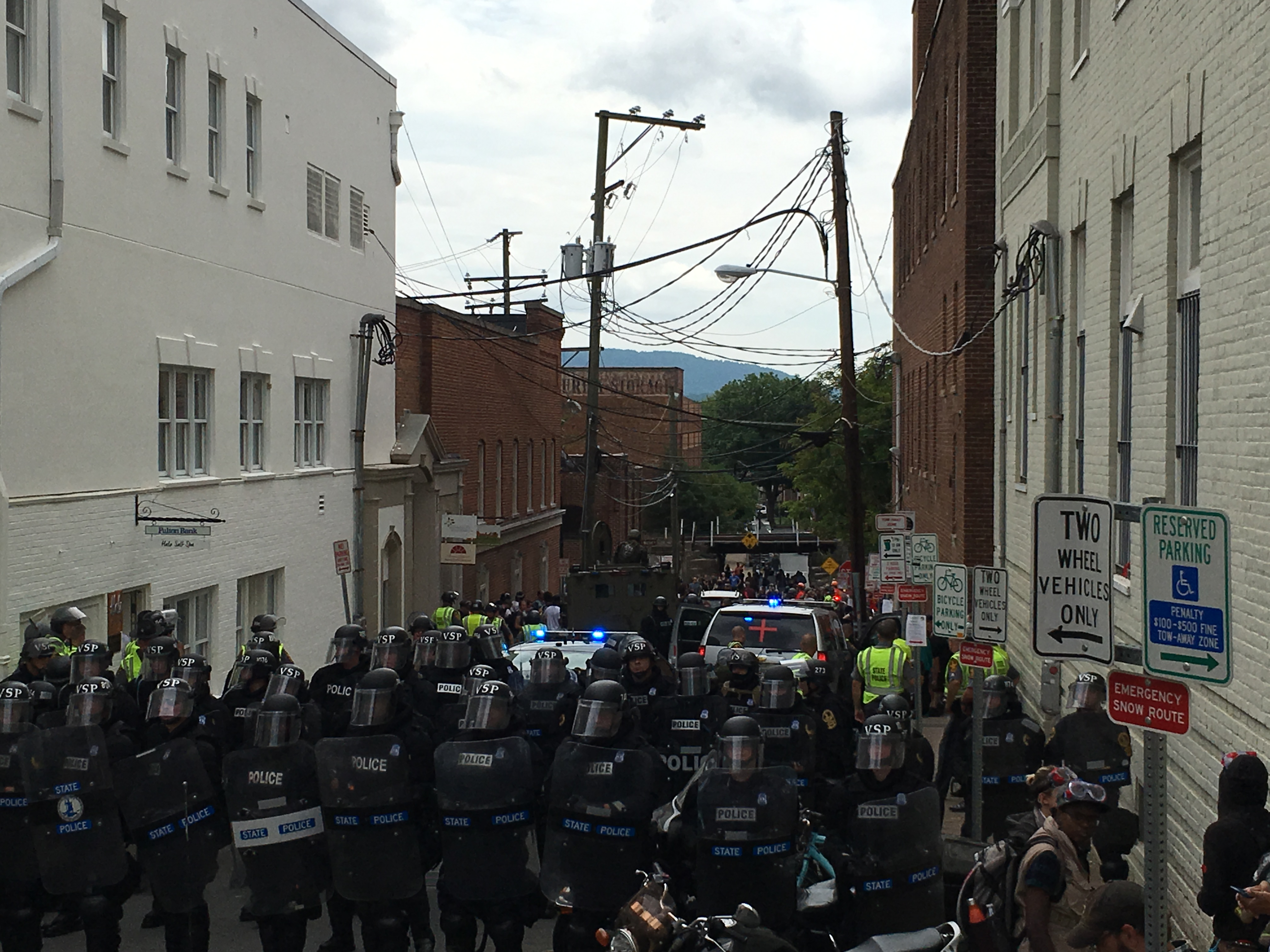
Police blocking the site of the crash

Felicia Correa, Heyer's childhood friend, launched a crowdfunding page for her funeral expenses. She said that she was speaking for Heyer's mother when she set up the page, expressing that she was not ready to speak in public. Felicia said, "She died doing what was right. My heart is broken, but I am forever proud of her." The GoFundMe campaign created to support Heyer's family surpassed US$200,000 in a day. Fundraising websites removed campaigns that had sought to fund Fields's legal defense. The Democratic Socialists of America quickly raised US$198,000, but were criticized for the convoluted application process for victims and timeliness in addressing their applications. The money raised was eventually transferred to the National Compassion Fund for management and disbursement.

Her mother said she wanted Heather's name to become "a rallying cry for justice and equality and fairness and compassion". Heyer's memorial service was held at Charlottesville's Paramount Theater on August 16; her mother spoke to hundreds of mourners, asking them to honor her by acting against injustice and turning "anger into righteous action". On the last day of his job, photojournalist Ryan Kelly took a photograph of the attack for The Daily Progress, the sole daily newspaper in the vicinity of Charlottesville. On April 16, 2018, Kelly won the Pulitzer Prize for Breaking News Photography.

Photographer Jeremiah Knupp also took a photograph of the attack, working for The News Leader, a daily newspaper serving Staunton, Virginia, and the surrounding areas. Knupp took the photograph from a pole on the parking garage, south-west of the intersection of Water Street and Fourth Street Southeast.

Heyer's mother Susan Bro started the nonprofit Heather Heyer Foundation. It was funded from the GoFundMe campaign and from new donations. Bro said that the foundation would be devoted to civil rights and provide scholarships to people who want social justice. She quit her job as a secretary and bookkeeper for a Virginia Cooperative Extension office after the attack, and became the president and chair of the board of the Heather Heyer Foundation.

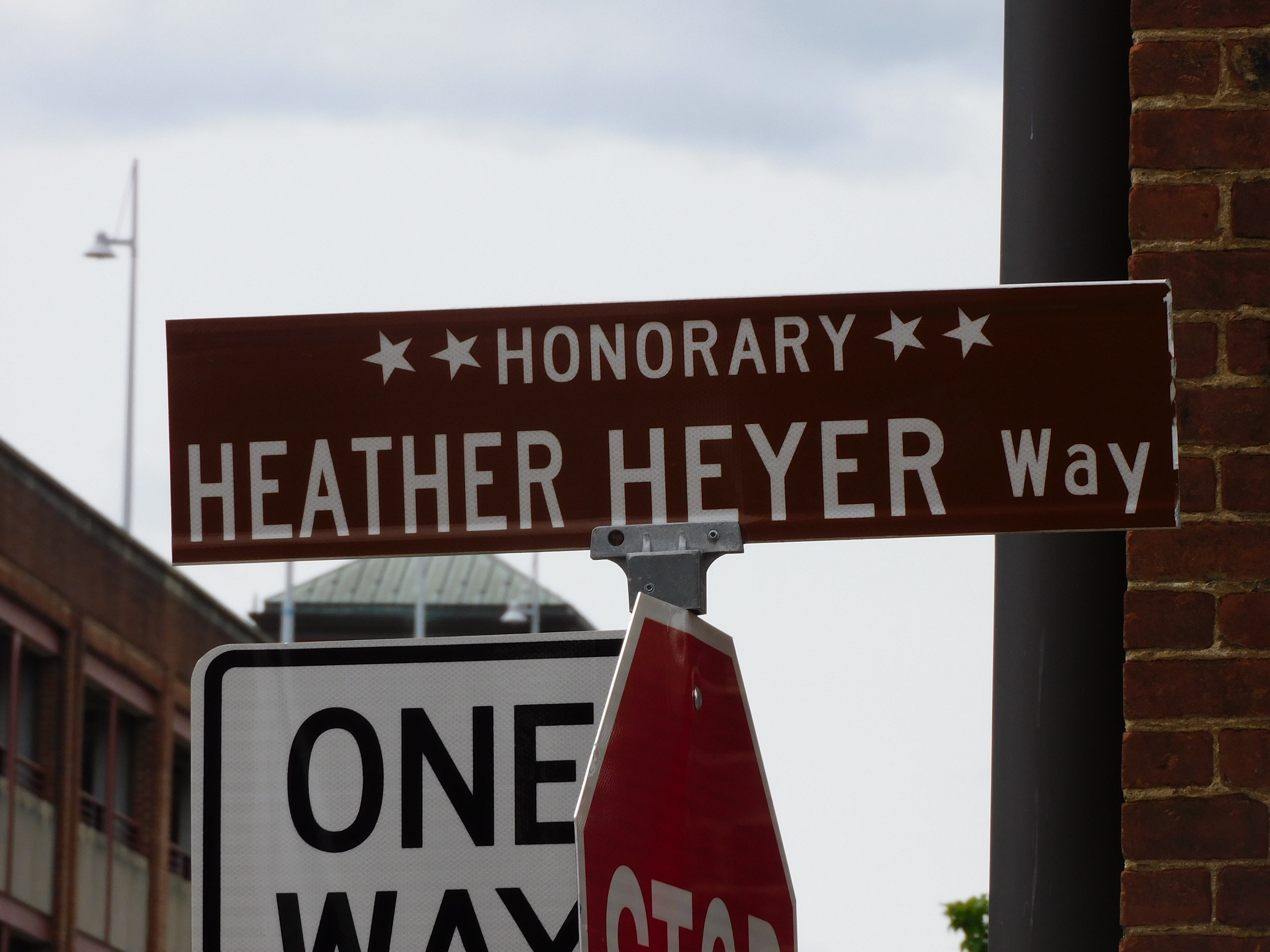
Honorary Heather Heyer Way

On August 15, 2017, Tadrint and Micah Washington, who were in the white sedan that was hit during the attack, filed a US$3 million lawsuit in damages against Jason Kessler, James Alex Fields Jr., Richard Spencer and 30 other groups and individuals.

Susan Bro presented the 2017 MTV Video Music Award for Best Fight Against the System.

In September 2017, New York's 25th Assembly district Representative Nily Rozic, a Democrat, filed a bill and petitioned the New York State Office of Parks, Recreation and Historic Preservation to rename the Donald J. Trump State Park in honor of Heyer.

On December 20, 2017, a part of Fourth Street Southeast in Charlottesville, where the attack occurred, was designated Honorary Heather Heyer Way.

On the afternoon of May 12, 2018, Heyer's close friend Marissa Blair married her fiancé Marcus Martin, who pushed her out of the car's way and was injured in the attack himself. During the ceremony, Blair led a butterfly release in remembrance of Heyer.

Director Spike Lee dedicated his 2018 film BlacKkKlansman in Heyer's memory, featuring video footage of the attack.

In 2018, The Washington Post and The New York Times wrote that the attack had helped bring about the alt-right's decline in power, quoting leading figures in the alt-right and anti-extremism experts who said membership in alt-right-affiliated groups had fallen and rallies organized by these groups had become less frequent. The Guardian contended that the event motivated anti-fascist activists to more extensively coordinate counter-protests against these groups, further facilitating their declines.
