= George W. Harris (disambiguation) =

George W. Harris may refer to:

- George W. Harris, soldier
- George Harris (philosopher), American philosopher
- George W. Harris, a founder of Harris & Ewing
