= Ryan Kelly (photojournalist) =

American photojournalist (born 1986)

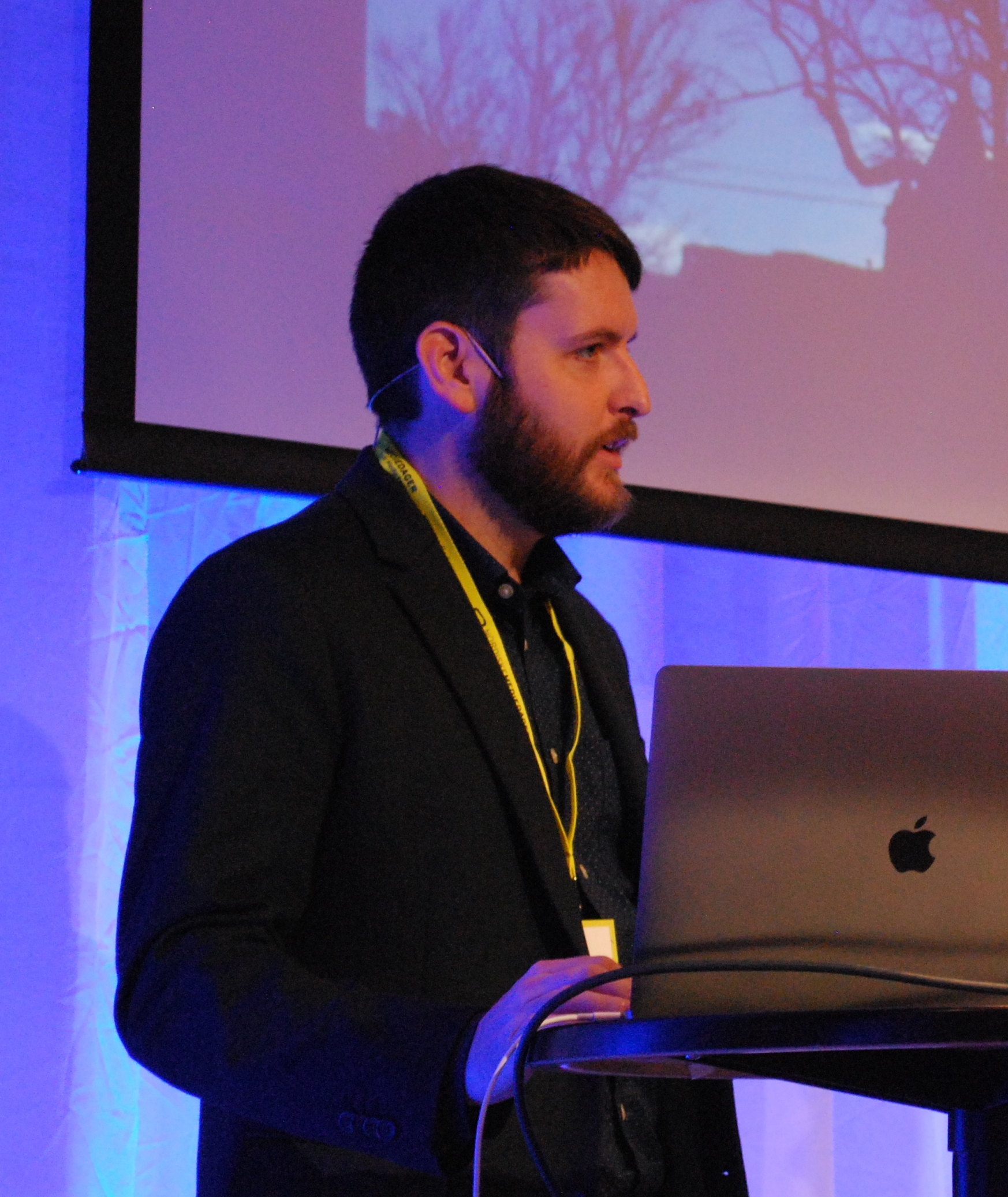
Ryan Kelly in 2019

Ryan Kelly (born 1986) is an American photojournalist. He won the Pulitzer Prize for his work on the 2017 Unite the Right Rally in Charlottesville, Virginia, for a photograph showing a man running over protestors.

He served as a photojournalist at The Daily Progress in Charlottesville, from 2013 to 2017 and is now the Digital and Social Media Coordinator at Ardent Craft Ales.

== Career ==
Kelly was an intern at the Daily Press in Newport News, Virginia. He joined The Daily Progress in Charlottesville in 2013 as a photojournalist. He left the newspaper after nearly four years, citing low pay, long hours, bad schedules and constant stress.

He now works as a Digital and Social Media Coordinator at Ardent Craft Ales. He also freelances regularly, covering all the University of Virginia home football and basketball games. Kelly also takes various assignments from several newspapers in Central Virginia.

== Honors and awards ==
Kelly was included in TIME's Top 10 Photo of 2017 in March 2018 and won 1st place in Pictures of the Year International 2017. Ryan Kelly's piece “Car Attack” earned him second prize in World Press Photo’s 2018 Spot News contest.

Sports Illustrated used Kelly's photograph of University of Virginia forward Isaiah Wilkins for the cover of its issue released March 12, 2018 covering the 2018 NCAA March Madness.

Ryan Kelly's earliest accolades were for his sports photography. In 2011, he placed third in the Virginia News Photographers Association 2011 clip contest, third quarter in the sports division. The next year he took home first place in the VNPA 2012 clip contest, first quarter in sports. Kelly was listed as 6 of 25 journalists under 25 by Boston.com in 2013.

== Personal life ==
Kelly was born in 1986, in Springfield, Virginia. He attended West Springfield High School before moving to Newport News, Virginia to attend Christopher Newport University, where he pursued a degree in English. During his time at Christopher Newport University, Kelly worked on the school newspaper, The Captain's Log, as a reporter and editor later picking up a camera, which led to him focusing on photojournalism. In 2013, Kelly and his family moved to Charlottesville, where he worked for The Daily Progress. After four years on staff with the newspaper he and his family moved to Richmond, Virginia where they currently reside.
