= Douglas Browning =

American philosopher (1929–2023)

Grayson Douglas Browning
- Born: 7 March 1929; Seminole, Oklahoma, U.S.
- Died: 2023 (aged 93–94)

Education
- Education: University of Texas (MA, PhD)
- Thesis: Judgment and Motivation in Contemporary Intuitionist Ethics (1958)

Philosophical work
- Era: 21st-century philosophy
- Region: Western philosophy
- Institutions: University of Texas at Austin, University of Miami
- Doctoral students: George Harris
- Main interests: ethics

Grayson Douglas Browning (7 March 1929 – 2023) was an American philosopher and academic who was Professor Emeritus of Philosophy at University of Texas at Austin. He is known for his works on ethics. Browning was a president of the Florida Philosophical Association (1967–1968). He died in 2023.

== Books ==
- Act and Agent, Coral Gables, Fla., 1964
- Philosophers of Process (ed.), New York, 1965; 2nd edn, New York, 1998
- Poems and Visions, South Miami, Fla., 1968
- Ontology and the Practical Arena, University Park, Penn., 1990
