= Florida Philosophical Association =

American philosophical organization (founded 1955)

- Abbreviation: FPA
- Formation: 1955
- Type: Scholarly and academic society
- Headquarters: FPA headquarters: Department of Philosophy, University of Florida; 330 Griffin-Floyd Hall; Gainesville, FL 32611-8545 Florida Philosophical Review headquarters: University of Central Florida, 4000 Central Florida Blvd, Orlando, FL 32816-1352
- Region served: Florida
- Members: 349
- President: Susan Peppers-Bates
- Vice President: Joshua Rust
- Secretary-Treasurer: Ron Claypool
- Website: meta.phil.ufl.edu/host/fpa/

The Florida Philosophical Association (FPA) is a scholarly academic organization founded in 1955 to promote the study of philosophy in Florida. The organization sponsors an annual conference in November. Past presidents include Grayson Douglas Browning (1967–1968), Ellen Stone Haring (1974–1975), Jaakko Hintikka (1984–1985), and Roy Weatherford (1997–1998).

The Florida Philosophical Review is the peer-reviewed electronic journal of the FPA. It is published annually or biannually by the Department of Philosophy of the University of Central Florida.

The president for 2025–2026 has been the feminist philosopher Susan Peppers-Bates of Stetson University.
