= Dizzy Gillespie 1964 presidential campaign =

American political campaign

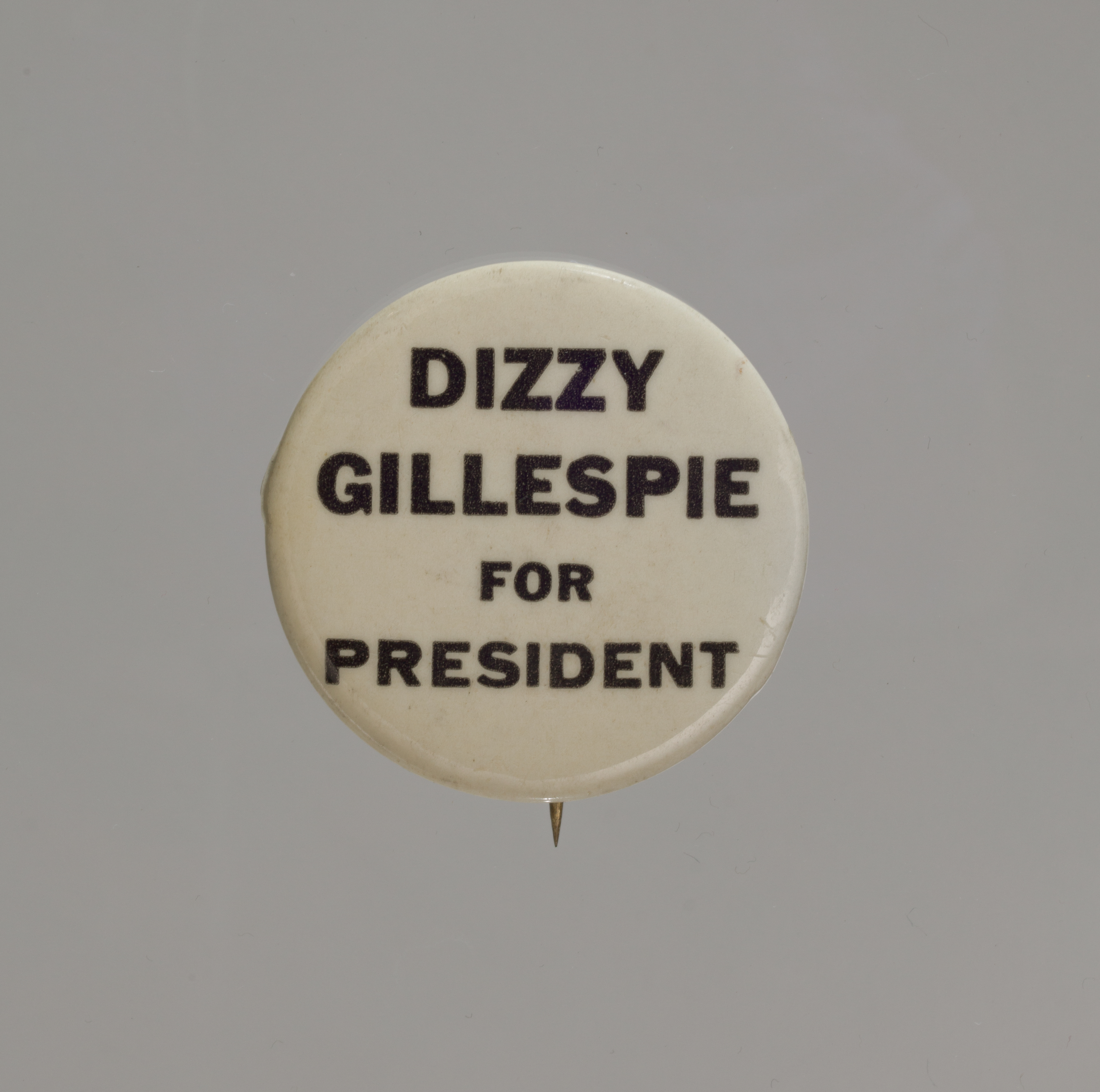
Pinback button for Gillespie's campaign

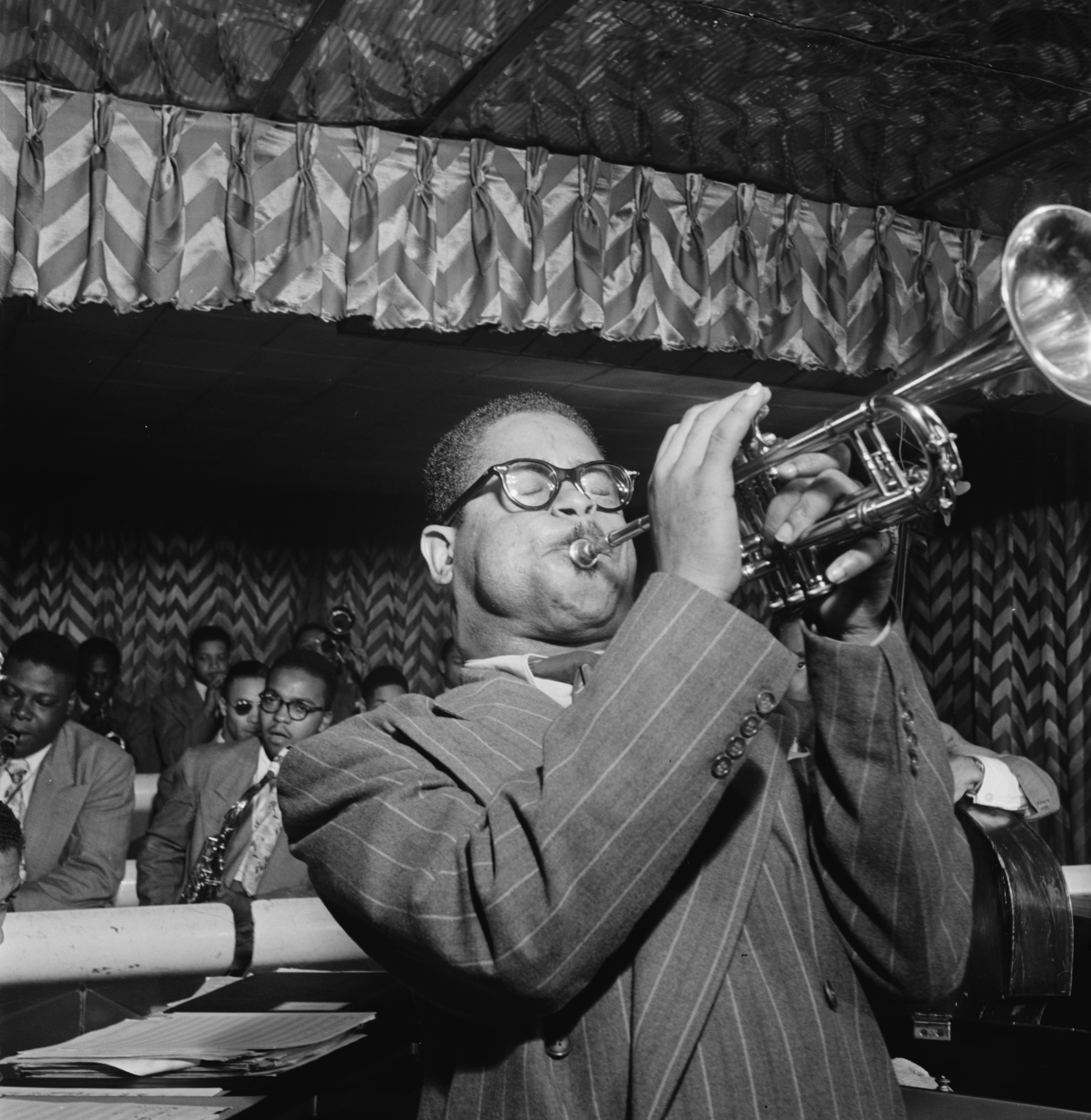
Gillespie playing the trumpet

The Dizzy Gillespie 1964 presidential campaign was a political campaign of jazz musician Dizzy Gillespie to run for president of the United States in 1964. He ran as an independent write-in candidate and proposed to have a cabinet of other musicians. Previously, his booking agency had created campaign buttons as a joke. He and his supporters encouraged the Secretary of State of California to accept Gillespie as an independent candidate. Gillespie eventually withdrew from the race, ran again in 1971, and again withdrew before the election.

== Platform and campaign ==
The jazz musician Dizzy Gillespie campaigned as an independent write-in candidate during the 1964 United States presidential campaign. When asked why he was running for the presidency, Gillespie replied "Because we need one", this became the slogan for his campaign. Gillespie said that his campaign was not just a publicity stunt but was intended "to take advantage of the votes and publicity I'd receive and to promote change".

Gillespie promised that if he were elected, the White House would be renamed the Blues House, and he would have a cabinet composed of Duke Ellington (Secretary of State), Miles Davis (Director of the CIA), Max Roach (Secretary of Defense), Charles Mingus (Secretary of Peace), Ray Charles (Librarian of Congress), Louis Armstrong (Secretary of Agriculture), Mary Lou Williams (Ambassador to the Vatican), Thelonious Monk (Travelling Ambassador) and Malcolm X (Attorney General). He said his running mate would be Phyllis Diller. Gillespie pledged to provide housing and hospital care for all those who needed it and to withdraw American troops from the Vietnam War.

Gillespie's campaign was managed by the jazz critic Ralph Gleason and his wife. His campaign song was a rewrite of "Salt Peanuts", with lyrics reflecting the campaign.

== History ==
Campaign buttons had been manufactured years before by Gillespie's booking agency as a joke, but proceeds went to Congress of Racial Equality and the Southern Christian Leadership Conference headed by Martin Luther King Jr.; in later years, they became a collector's item.

Gillespie's supporters founded the John Birks Society, named for Gillespie's first two names and coined as an obvious rebuke to the right wing John Birch Society. Members of the John Birks Society were encouraged to write to the Secretary of State of California to accept Gillespie as an independent candidate for the presidency. Supporters from an initial twenty five states had expressed an interest in supporting Gillespie, but it was decided to focus attention on California.

Gillespie eventually withdrew from the race. The eventual election was won by the incumbent president, the Democrat Lyndon Johnson.

== Legacy ==
- In 1971, Gillespie announced he would run again but withdrew before the election. Ramona Crowell, a member of the Sioux tribe, was chosen by Gillespie as his vice president for that run.
- A 2004 play about Gillespie's campaign, Vote Dizzy!, by Jack Brooder, was staged in London, England, during that year's American presidential election.
