= John Birch Society =

American right-wing advocacy group

- Abbreviation: JBS
- Named after: John Birch
- Formation: December 9, 1958; 67 years ago
- Founder: Robert W. Welch Jr.
- Founded at: Indianapolis, Indiana, U.S.
- Type: Not-for-profit
- Purpose: Political advocacy group: anti-communism; paleoconservatism; right-wing politics; American Nationalism; Americanism; Libertarian conservatism; Constitutionalism; Ultraconservatism; Social Conservatism; Right-wing antiglobalism
- Headquarters: Grand Chute, Wisconsin, U.S.
- President: William F. Jasper
- Subsidiaries: The New American
- Affiliations: American Opinion Foundation; FreedomProject Academy
- Website: jbs.org

The John Birch Society (JBS) is an American right-wing political advocacy group. Founded in 1958, it is radical anti-communist, American nationalist, supports social conservatism, and is associated with ultraconservative, radical right, far-right, right-wing populist, and right-wing libertarian ideas. Originally based in Belmont, Massachusetts, the JBS is now headquartered in Grand Chute, Wisconsin, with local chapters throughout the United States. It owns American Opinion Publishing, Inc., which publishes the magazine The New American, and it is affiliated with an online school called FreedomProject Academy.

The society's founder, businessman Robert W. Welch Jr. (1899–1985), developed an organizational infrastructure of nationwide chapters in December 1958. The society rose quickly in membership and influence, and also became known for Welch's conspiracy theories. His allegation that Republican president Dwight D. Eisenhower was a communist agent was especially controversial. In the 1960s, the conservative William F. Buckley Jr. and National Review attempted to relegate the JBS to the fringes of the American right. JBS membership is kept private but is said to have neared 100,000 in the 1960s and 1970s, declining afterward.

In the 2010s and 2020s, several observers and commentators argued that, while the organization's influence peaked in the 1970s, "Bircherism" and its legacy of conspiracy theories began making a resurgence in the mid-2010s, and had become the dominant strain in the conservative movement. In particular, they argued that the JBS and its beliefs shaped the Republican Party, the Christian right, the first and second Trump administrations, and the broader conservative movement.

== Political positions ==
The John Birch Society from its start opposed collectivism as a "cancer" and by extension communism and big government. JBS publications referred to the fight against Communism as a spiritual war against the devil. Allegations that so-called "Insiders" have conspired to control the United States through communism and world government are a recurring theme of JBS publications. The organization and its founder, Robert W. Welch Jr., promoted Americanism as "the philosophical antithesis of Communism." It contended that the United States is a republic, not a democracy, and argued that states' rights should supersede those of the federal government. Welch infused constitutionalist and classical liberal principles, in addition to his conspiracy theories, into the JBS's ideology and rhetoric. In 1983, Congressman Larry McDonald, then the society's newly appointed chairman, characterized the JBS as belonging to the Old Right rather than the New Right.

The society opposes "one world government", the United Nations (UN), the North American Free Trade Agreement (NAFTA), the Central America Free Trade Agreement (CAFTA), the Free Trade Area of the Americas (FTAA), and other free trade agreements. It argues the U.S. Constitution has been devalued in favor of political and economic globalization. It has cited the existence of the former Security and Prosperity Partnership as evidence of a push towards a North American Union.

The JBS opposed the civil rights movement of the 1960s and the Equal Rights Amendment in the 1970s. It has campaigned for state nullification. It opposes efforts to call an Article V convention to amend the U.S. Constitution, and it has been influential at promoting opposition to it among Republican legislators. The JBS also supports auditing and eventually dismantling the Federal Reserve System. The JBS holds that the United States Constitution gives only Congress the ability to coin money, and does not permit it to delegate this power, or to transform the dollar into a fiat currency not backed by gold or silver.

Its publication The New American has described what it sees as American moral decline and threats to the family, including abortion, birth control, divorce, drugs, homosexuality, crime, violence, secular humanism, teenage pregnancy, teen suicide, environmentalism, feminism and pornography. The JBS has alleged that moral degeneracy is perpetrated by a conspiracy to make the United States vulnerable to internationalism. A JBS pamphlet distributed in 2024 illustrating a school on fire urged parents to withdraw children from public education, saying, "Reforming the schools is no longer an option. We must get them out now!"

The JBS has been described as ultraconservative, far-right, extremist, and fringe. The Southern Poverty Law Center (SPLC) lists the society as a "Patriot" group, a group that "advocate[s] or adhere[s] to extreme antigovernment doctrines". By the 1990s, the JBS was perceived as "more mainstream conservative" than in the 1960s. It has also been associated with the American libertarian movement, as well as business nationalism. The society's worldview was noted in the early 2000s for influencing the American militia movement, although the JBS had not publicly called for paramilitary training. Extremism expert George Michael wrote that "a virtual who's who of the American radical right had at one time or another sojourned" in the JBS.

=== Influence on conservatism ===
The JBS contributed to the development of modern American conservatism through its organizational tactics and its promotion of right-wing political views. Despite never considering itself a religious organization, the JBS played a role in the rise of the Moral Majority and the Christian right as major political forces, ideologically and tactically influencing multiple leaders in that movement including Tim LaHaye and Phyllis Schlafly. Scholar Celestini Carmen argues that LaHaye used the JBS's culture war methods and rhetoric of "fear, apocalyptic thought and conspiracy" to forge the Moral Majority, with "fear, anger, and disgust as essential ingredients." Joyce Mao states that "Evangelical theology easily lent itself to anticommunist crusade". She additionally contends that Christian pastors, including James W. Fifield Jr. who helped Welch expand to California, helped pave the way for the JBS. The historian D. J. Mulloy wrote in 2014 that the JBS has served as "a kind of bridge" between the Old Right (including the McCarthyites) of the 1940s–50s, the New Right of the 1970s–80s, and the Tea Party right of the 21st century.

Professor Edward H. Miller wrote that Welch and the JBS were "never excommunicated" from conservatism and that "the ideas of the John Birch Society paved the way for the conservatism of the twentieth century" and "shaped events in the twenty-first century". Scholar Daniel Smith writes that as the JBS, along with Liberty Lobby, became institutionalized "ideological hubs" between the 1960s and 1980s – with a focus on spreading their views through publications and other media – they helped shape anti-internationalism into anti-globalism. Miller also writes that JBS helped stop the Equal Rights Amendment and helped set the stage for the Reagan Era, while Mulloy writes that the JBS "played an essential role in the revitalization of conservatism" and "trained a generation of conservative activists." According to Professor Matthew Dallek, modern American conservatism "bear[s] the imprint of the John Birch Society," and "the GOP has largely replaced the ideological tenets of Reaganism with a worldview inherited from the John Birch Society (JBS)." Dallek also writes that the organization's pioneering use of front groups "became a template for conservative advocacy for decades to come." According to The Atlantic in 2024, Donald Trump's 2016 election "saw many of its core instincts finally reflected in the White House," and the JBS "now fits neatly into the mainstream of the American right." According to Professor John Kenneth White, noting actions taken by the second Trump administration and state governments, "Trump's second term has brought about the final victory of the John Birch Society."

JBS took an early stance in opposing abortion and social liberalism, and its TRIM committees, which supported lower taxes, helped lead to the Reagan tax cuts. By the early 2020s, multiple commentators and academics argued that the John Birch Society and its beliefs had successfully taken over the Republican Party and the broader conservative movement. Efforts of Moms for Liberty in the 2020s to influence public education in the United States via school board elections and book bans have been compared to JBS's efforts in the 1960s. When introducing legislation to withdraw the U.S. from the UN, Senator Mike Lee used "some of the same arguments to support the bill" that the JBS "first employed." By the 2020s, some national Republican and conservative figures openly associated with the JBS.

== History ==
=== Origins ===
The John Birch Society was established on December 9, 1958, in Indianapolis, Indiana, at the conclusion of a two-day session of a group of 12 people led by Robert W. Welch Jr. Welch was a retired candy manufacturer from Belmont, Massachusetts, who had been a state Republican Party official and had unsuccessfully run in its 1950 lieutenant governor primary. In 1954, Welch wrote the first book about John Birch (an Army intelligence officer and Baptist missionary who was killed in a confrontation with Chinese Communist forces), titled The Life of John Birch. He organized an anti-Communist society to "promote less government, more responsibility, and a better world". He named his new organization in memory of Birch, saying that Birch was an unknown but dedicated anti-Communist, and the first American casualty of the Cold War. Welch alleged that a Communist conspiracy within the American government had suppressed the truth about Birch's killing.

==== John Birch ====
John Birch was an American Baptist who went to China as a missionary in 1940 when the Japanese invasion had created suffering and chaos during the Second Sino-Japanese War. He was a U.S. military intelligence officer under Brigadier General Claire Lee Chennault in China. Chennault commanded the "Flying Tigers" and afterward U.S. Army Air Forces units in China. In April 1942, Birch helped Lieutenant Colonel Doolittle and his flight crew, among other crews, a few days after they bailed out of their B-25 bomber over Japanese-held territory in China during the "Doolittle raid". Beginning in July 1942, Birch, who spoke Chinese, became an Army intelligence officer. He operated alone or with Nationalist Chinese soldiers, and regularly risked his life in Japanese-held territory in China. His many activities included setting up Chinese agent and radio intelligence networks, and rescuing downed American pilots; he had two emergency aircraft runways built. Although he suffered from malaria, he refused furloughs.

In 1945, Birch was promoted to captain and began working in China both for and with the Office of Strategic Services (OSS), the U.S. wartime intelligence service in World War II. In August, after the Japanese surrendered, Birch was ordered by the OSS to northern China to obtain the surrender of the Japanese commanders at their installations. On August 24, nine days after the war, Birch left by train with his party which included two American soldiers, five Chinese officers, and two Koreans who spoke Japanese. After spending a night in a village, the party proceeded by handcar the next morning, and ran into a group of 300 armed Chinese Communists. Birch and his Chinese officer aide approached them and were told to surrender their weapons and the group's equipment. Birch refused, and after arguing about it with their commander, they were allowed to proceed. Along the way, Birch's party encountered more groups of Communists. The party arrived at a train station at Hwang Kao which was occupied by more Chinese Communists. Birch requested to speak with their leader. Birch and his aide approached the group's leader and after Birch refused to give up his sidearm, both were beaten and shot. Birch's corpse was bayonetted. The rest of Birch's party were taken prisoner. Birch's aide survived and the prisoners were later released. Birch's remains were recovered, and a Catholic burial service was held with military honors on a hillside outside of Suzhou, in eastern China. The Chinese Communists, who were active in northern China and Manchuria, were World War II allies with the United States. Birch believed that Mao Zedong and the Chinese Communists intended to take over China after the war and move into Korea. There were different explanations and theories as to why Birch was killed, ranging from his party showing up at Hwang Kao instead of Ninchuan, Birch's scheduled meeting with Chinese puppet troops of the Sixth Army under General Hu Peng-chu, misunderstanding by local guerillas, and provocation from Birch himself.

==== Founding and beliefs ====
The founding members of the JBS included Harry Lynde Bradley, co-founder of the Allen Bradley Company and the Lynde and Harry Bradley Foundation, Fred C. Koch, founder of Koch Industries, and Robert Waring Stoddard, president of Wyman-Gordon, a major industrial enterprise. Another was Revilo P. Oliver, a University of Illinois professor who was later expelled from the Society. Koch became one of the organization's primary financial supporters. According to investigative journalist Jane Mayer, David Koch and Charles Koch, Koch's sons, were also members of the JBS; however, both left it before the 1970s. A transcript of Welch's two-day presentation at the founding meeting was published as The Blue Book of the John Birch Society, and became a cornerstone of its beliefs, with each new prospective member receiving a copy. Welch stated:

[B]oth the U.S. and Soviet governments are controlled by the same furtive conspiratorial cabal of internationalists, greedy bankers, and corrupt politicians. If left unexposed, the traitors inside the U.S. government would betray the country's sovereignty to the United Nations for a collectivist New World Order, managed by a 'one-world socialist government'.

Welch saw collectivism as the main threat to Western culture, and modern American liberals as "secret Communist traitors" who provided cover for the gradual process of collectivism, with the ultimate goal of replacing the nations of western civilization with a one-world socialist government. He wrote: "There are many stages of welfarism, socialism, and collectivism in general, but Communism is the ultimate state of them all, and they all lead inevitably in that direction." Welch predicted that "you have only a few more years before the country in which you live will become four separate provinces in a world-wide Communist dominion ruled by police-state methods from the Kremlin."

Welch held that devout, fundamentalist religious believers (though fundamentalist Christians in particular) were key to resisting atheistic communism. He saw such religious belief as something which would "instill values of individual responsibility and morality that prevented practitioners from relying on the state for their welfare. By inference, those who took government assistance or supported New Deal concepts not only forfeited their self-determination but also could not be considered to be truly spiritual." He believed that ecumenism, in the form of the National Council of Churches whom he opposed, was a way of exerting Communist control over Protestant churches.

The JBS was organized to be, in Welch's words, "under completely authoritative control at all levels". It incorporated aspects of business hierarchies and also the Communist cells Welch opposed but whose discipline he admired. Chapters of 10 to 20 members each had a leader appointed from above, and were expected to meet twice a month. Members of chapters that grew larger than 20 members were expected to break off and form a new small chapter.

The activities of the JBS include distributing literature, pamphlets, magazines, videos and other material; the society also sponsors a Speaker's Bureau, which invites "speakers who are keenly aware of the motivations that drive political policy". One of the first public activities of the society was a "Get US Out!" (of membership in the UN) campaign, which claimed in 1959 that the "Real nature of [the] UN is to build a One World Government". The society also alleged that Communists and UN supporters were conducting an "assault on Christmas" to "destroy all religious beliefs and customs". In 1960, Welch advised JBS members to: "Join your local P.T.A. at the beginning of the school year, get your conservative friends to do likewise, and go to work to take it over." One Man's Opinion, a magazine launched by Welch in 1956, was renamed American Opinion. In 1965, Welch established a JBS-affiliated publication known as The Review of the News, which was intended for a larger readership and covered news. In 1985, these magazines merged into The New American, a biweekly magazine published by the Society.

=== Eisenhower issue ===
For the first eighteen months of its existence, JBS "operated in relative obscurity"; though in 1959 it began to gain momentum as it started one of its earliest front groups, the Committee Against Summit Entanglements (CASE), to oppose President Dwight D. Eisenhower's 1959 summit with Soviet First Secretary Nikita Khrushchev. The JBS viewed Eisenhower as weak, having surrendered to the Soviet Union. By raising money – in part from wealthy figures in business – in order to purchase advertisements in The New York Times and over a hundred other newspapers, sending hundreds of thousands of postcards, as well as circulating a petition, CASE's cause gained the support of the right. The group's campaign was a success in terms of bringing Birch talking points into broader discourse. The following year, in July 1960, the Chicago Daily News published a relatively in-depth story on the Society, including the contention of founder Robert Welch, that Eisenhower was a "dedicated, conscious agent" of the communist conspiracy in the United States. "For the next few years Birchers found themselves at the center of a storm of controversy".

Welch had first made the statement in 1954 when he wrote in a widely circulated statement, The Politician: "Could Eisenhower really be simply a smart politician, entirely without principles and hungry for glory, who is only the tool of the Communists? The answer is yes." He went on: "With regard to ... Eisenhower, it is difficult to avoid raising the question of deliberate treason." The controversial paragraph was removed before final publication of The Politician.

The sensationalism of Welch's charges against Eisenhower prompted several conservatives and Republicans, most prominently Goldwater and the intellectuals of William F. Buckley's circle, to renounce outright or quietly shun the group. Buckley, an early friend and admirer of Welch, regarded his accusations against Eisenhower as "paranoid and idiotic libels" and attempted unsuccessfully to purge Welch from the Birch Society. From then on, Buckley became the leading intellectual spokesman and organizer of the anti-Bircher conservatives. Buckley's biographer, John B. Judis, wrote that "Buckley was beginning to worry that with the John Birch Society growing so rapidly, the right-wing upsurge in the country would take an ugly, even Fascist turn rather than leading toward the kind of conservatism National Review had promoted." Despite Buckley's opposition, the author Edward H. Miller wrote, the JBS "remained a force in the conservative movement", and arguments to the contrary are "greatly exaggerated".

The booklet found support from Ezra Taft Benson, then Eisenhower's Secretary of Agriculture and later the 13th president of the LDS Church. In a letter to his friend FBI chief J. Edgar Hoover, Benson asked "how can a man [Eisenhower] who seems to be so strong for Christian principles and base American concepts be so effectively used as a tool to serve the Communist conspiracy?" Benson privately fought to prevent the Bureau from condemning the JBS, which prompted Hoover to distance himself from Benson. At one point in 1971, Hoover directed his staff to lie to Benson to avoid having to meet with him about the issue.

=== 1960s ===
In the 1960s, the JBS became known as a right-wing organization with an anti-Communist ideology. It was moderately active in that decade with numerous chapters, but rarely engaged in coalition building with other conservatives. It was rejected by most conservatives because of Welch's conspiracy theories. The philosopher Ayn Rand said in a 1964 Playboy interview: "I consider the Birch Society futile, because they are not for capitalism but merely against Communism ... I gather they believe that the disastrous state of today's world is caused by a Communist conspiracy. This is childishly naïve and superficial. No country can be destroyed by a mere conspiracy, it can be destroyed only by ideas." Some historians said the JBS had a large role in 1960s politics, and functioned much like a third party, forcing "the GOP, the Democrats, and conservatives of all types to respond to its agenda", in Jonathan M. Schoenwald's words.

By March 1961, the JBS had 60,000 to 100,000 members and, according to Welch, "a staff of 28 people in the Home Office; about 30 Coordinators (or Major Coordinators) in the field, who are fully paid as to salary and expenses; and about 100 Coordinators (or Section Leaders as they are called in some areas), who work on a volunteer basis as to all or part of their salary, or expenses, or both". According to Political Research Associates (a non-profit research group that investigates the far-right), the society "pioneered grassroots lobbying, combining educational meetings, petition drives and letter-writing campaigns. Rick Perlstein described its main activity in the 1960s as "monthly meetings to watch a film by Welch, followed by writing postcards or letters to government officials linking specific policies to the Communist menace".

One early campaign against the second summit between the United States and the Soviet Union (which urged President Dwight D. Eisenhower, "If you go, don't come back!") generated over 600,000 postcards and letters, according to the society. In 1961 Welch offered $2,300 in prizes to college students for the best essays on "grounds of impeachment" of Chief Justice Warren, a prime target of ultra-conservatives. A June 1964 society campaign to oppose Xerox corporate sponsorship of TV programs favorable to the UN produced 51,279 letters from 12,785 individuals." By the middle of the decade, it had 400 American Opinion bookstores selling its literature.

In 1962, William F. Buckley Jr., editor of the National Review, an influential conservative magazine, denounced Welch and the John Birch Society as "far removed from common sense" and urged the GOP to purge itself of Welch's influence. In the late 1960s, Welch insisted that the Lyndon B. Johnson administration's war against Communist guerillas and North Vietnamese troops during the Vietnam War, which was unpopular among liberals and leftists but not among conservatives, was part of a Communist plot aimed at taking over the United States. Welch demanded that the United States get out of Vietnam, thus aligning the JBS with the left. The society opposed water fluoridation, which it called "mass medicine" and a Communist effort to destroy American children.

Former Eisenhower cabinet member Ezra Taft Benson—a leading Mormon—spoke in favor of the JBS. In January 1963, The Church of Jesus Christ of Latter-day Saints issued a statement distancing itself from the Society. Antisemitic, racist, anti-Mormon, anti-Masonic groups criticized the organization's acceptance of Jews, non-whites, Masons, and Mormons as members. These opponents accused Welch of harboring feminist, ecumenical, and evolutionary ideas. Welch rejected these accusations by his detractors: "All we are interested in here is opposing the advance of the Communists, and eventually destroying the whole Communist conspiracy, so that Jews and Christians alike, and Mohammedans and Buddhists, can again have a decent world in which to live."

In a 1963 report, the California Senate Factfinding Subcommittee on Un-American Activities, following an investigation into the JBS, found no evidence it was "a secret, fascist, subversive, un-American, [or] anti-Semitic organization." In 1964, Welch favored Barry Goldwater for the Republican presidential nomination, but the membership split, with two-thirds supporting Goldwater and one-third supporting Richard Nixon, who did not run. A number of Birch members and their allies were Goldwater supporters in 1964 and a hundred of them were delegates at the 1964 Republican National Convention.

In April 1966, a New York Times article on New Jersey and the society voiced—in part—a concern for "the increasing tempo of radical right attacks on local government, libraries, school boards, parent-teacher associations, mental health programs, the Republican Party and, most recently, the ecumenical movement." It then characterized the society as "by far the most successful and 'respectable' radical right organization in the country. It operates alone or in support of other extremist organizations whose major preoccupation, like that of the Birchers, is the internal Communist conspiracy in the United States." The JBS also opposed the creation of the first sex education curriculum in the United States through a division called the Movement to Restore Decency (MOTOREDE). Surviving MOTOREDE pamphlets date from 1967 to 1971. Additionally, the JBS advocated against other manifestations of social liberalism, including abortion. JBS members and activities were featured in "The Radical Americans", a series produced by National Educational Television (NET) and WGBH-TV that aired in 1966 on NET outlets. JBS membership peaked in 1965 or 1966 at an estimated 100,000.

The JBS opposed the 1960s civil rights movement and claimed the movement had Communists in important positions. In the latter half of 1965, the JBS produced a flyer titled "What's Wrong With Civil Rights?" and used the flyer as a newspaper advertisement. In the piece, one of the answers was: "For the civil rights movement in the United States, with all of its growing agitation and riots and bitterness, and insidious steps towards the appearance of a civil war, has not been infiltrated by the Communists, as you now frequently hear. It has been deliberately and almost wholly created by the Communists patiently building up to this present stage for more than forty years." The society believed that the ultimate aim of the civil rights movement was the creation of a "Soviet Negro Republic" in the southeastern United States and opposed the Civil Rights Act of 1964, claiming it violated the Tenth Amendment to the United States Constitution and overstepped individual states' rights to enact laws regarding civil rights. Some prominent black conservatives such as George Schuyler and Manning Johnson joined forces with the JBS during this period and echoed the Society's rhetoric about the civil-rights movement and the Civil Rights Act of 1964.

Although Welch and the JBS publicly opposed racism and antisemitism, and had a policy of expelling individuals who held such views, in 1968, a notable faction of JBS members expressed opposition toward desegregation efforts and demonstrated solidarity with white nationalists by supporting George Wallace. Both the SPLC and the Anti-Defamation League of B'nai B'rith have ascertained the existence in the past of antisemitic and racist elements, such as Revilo P. Oliver and Eric D. Butler. Many of these individuals later left or were expelled from the JBS because of these views. The JBS launched a "Support Your Local Police" campaign in the mid-1960s. The campaign openly advocated against the use of federal officers to enforce civil rights laws.

At the organization's tenth anniversary celebration in 1968, Welch announced the creation of John Birch University (now Robert Welch University), which it later described as an "alternative to the socialist/internationalist/atheist education afforded by the major government-controlled colleges and universities." John Birch University primarily served as a library and educational resource for decades, running summer youth camps around the United States.

=== 1970s ===
By 1976, the JBS had 90,000 members, 240 paid staffers, and a $7 million annual budget according to a paper written by the American libertarian conservative tycoon Charles Koch.

The JBS was at the center of a free-speech law case in the 1970s, after American Opinion accused a Chicago lawyer, Elmer Gertz, who was representing the family of a young man killed by a police officer, of being part of a Communist conspiracy to merge all police agencies in the country into one large force. The resulting libel suit, Gertz v. Robert Welch, Inc., reached the United States Supreme Court, which held that a state may allow a private figure such as Gertz to recover actual damages from a media defendant without proving malice but that a public figure does have to prove actual malice, according to the standard laid out in New York Times Co. v. Sullivan, in order to recover presumed damages or punitive damages. The court ordered a retrial in which Gertz prevailed.

Key causes of the JBS in the 1970s included opposition to both the Occupational Safety and Health Administration (OSHA) and to the establishment of diplomatic ties with the People's Republic of China. The JBS claimed that Nixon's visit to mainland China had "humiliated the American people and betrayed our anti-communist allies" and that it was the primary supplier of illicit heroin into the United States. The society also was opposed to transferring control of the Panama Canal from American to Panamanian sovereignty.

During the 1970s, the Kuomintang in the Republic of China under Executive Yuan Premier Chiang Ching-kuo organized a people's diplomacy campaign in the United States in an effort to mobilize American political sentiment in opposition to the PRC through mass demonstrations and petitions. Among these efforts, the John Birch Society worked with the KMT on a petition writing campaign through which Americans were urged to write their local government officials and ask them to "Cut the Red China connection."

The John Birch Society, along with other conservative groups such as the Eagle Forum and the Christian right, successfully opposed the Equal Rights Amendment in the 1970s. JBS played a key role in stopping the ERA's ratification – on par with Phyllis Schlafly, herself a JBS member – and it organized opposition to it across the nation. JBS accused the ERA's supporters of subversion, asserting that the ERA was part of a Communist plot "to reduce human beings to living at the same level as animals."

The JBS advocated for lower taxes, including reducing the federal income tax rate. By 1977, it had established over 200 TRIM (Tax Relief Immediately) committees across the U.S. In the 1970s, the JBS also played a prominent role in promoting the false claim that laetrile was a cancer cure, and in advocating for the legalization of the compound as a drug. A New York Times review in 1977 found JBS and other far-right groups were involved in pro-laetrile campaigns in at least nine states. "Virtually all" of the officers of the "Committee for Freedom of Choice in Cancer Therapy," the leading pro-laetrile group, were JBS members. Congressman and Birch Society leader Lawrence P. McDonald was involved in the campaign as a member of the committee. The JBS opposed Earth Day, suggesting that it was a Communist plot and noting that the first celebration fell on the 100th anniversary of Vladimir Lenin's birth.

The JBS was organized into local chapters during this period. Ernest Brosang, a New Jersey regional coordinator, claimed that it was virtually impossible for opponents of the society to penetrate its policy-making levels, thereby protecting it from "anti-American" takeover attempts. Its activities included the distribution of literature critical of civil rights legislation, warnings over the influence of the United Nations, and the release of petitions to impeach United States Supreme Court Justice Earl Warren. To spread their message, members held showings of documentary films and operated initiatives such as "Let Freedom Ring", a nationwide network of recorded telephone messages.

=== 1980s and 1990s ===
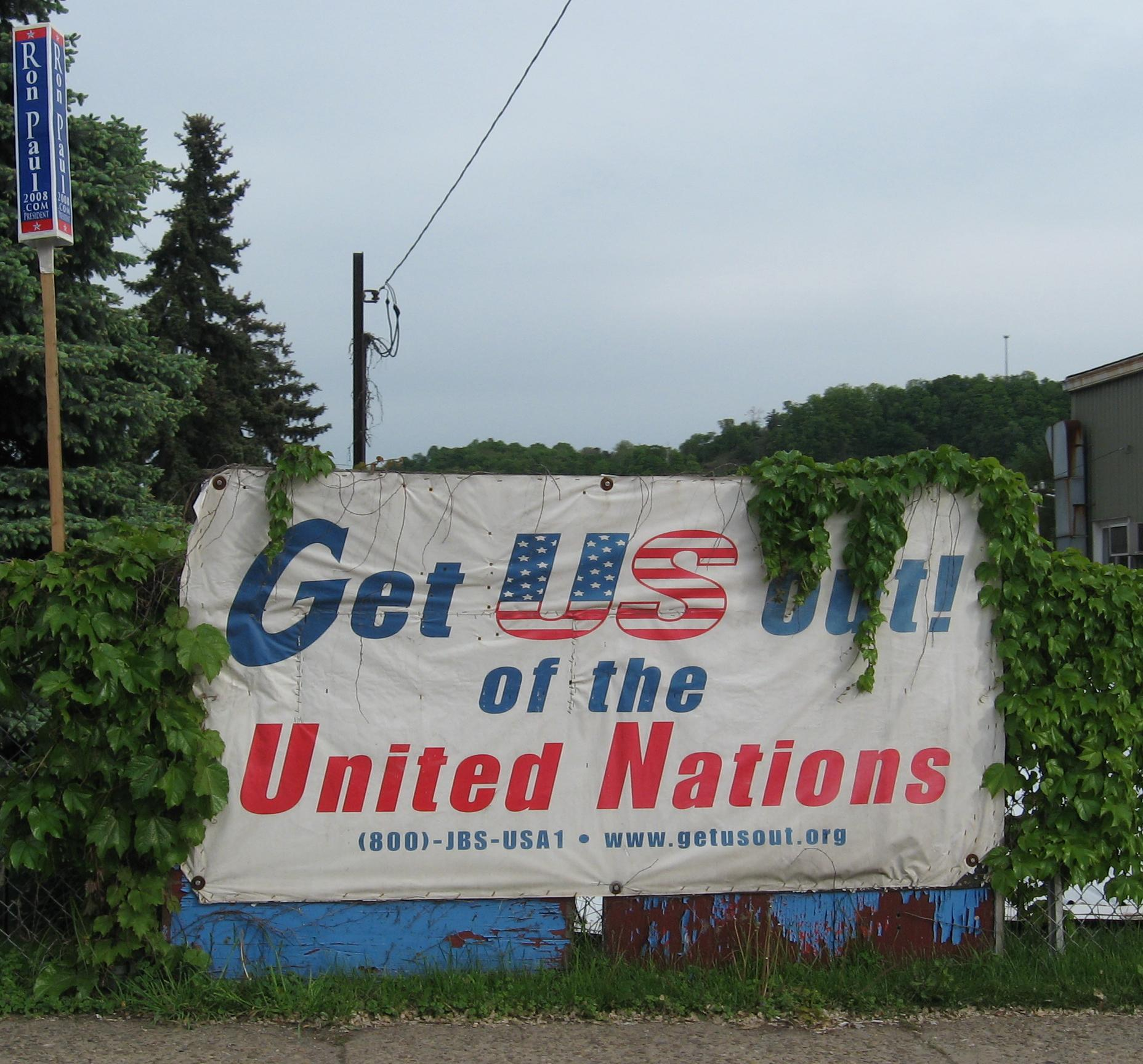
A sign advocating America's withdrawal produced by the John Birch Society

After the Vietnam War, the JBS's membership and influence declined. This decline continued through the 1980s and 1990s due to Welch's death in 1985 (at age 85) and the end of the Cold War in 1991. By the mid-1990s, membership in the JBS was estimated between 15,000 and 20,000. While other anti-Communist organizations faded away following the Cold War's end, the JBS survived and experienced some growth in the 1990s. News reports said President George H.W. Bush's invocation of a "new world order" during the 1991 Gulf War gave the society a new audience. The society consolidated its national office in Appleton, Wisconsin, the birthplace of Senator Joseph McCarthy.

In 1984, three members of the San Diego Padres, namely Eric Show, Mark Thurmond, and Dave Dravecky, revealed they were members of the JBS. The society campaigned against the ratification of the Genocide Convention, arguing it would erode U.S. national sovereignty. The JBS continued to press for an end to United States membership in the United Nations. As evidence of its effectiveness, the society pointed to the Utah State Legislature's failed resolution calling for United States withdrawal, as well as the actions of several other states where the society's membership was active.

The second head of the JBS was Congressman Larry McDonald (D) from Georgia. McDonald's first wife "estimated that, over the years, he had hosted 10,000 people in his living room for Bircher-inspired lectures and documentaries." In 1982, McDonald was appointed as national chairman of the Society. McDonald was killed in 1983 when airliner KAL 007 was shot down by a Soviet interceptor.

William P. Hoar, a writer for the JBS who has attacked mainstream politicians from Franklin D. Roosevelt to George W. Bush, published regularly in The New American and its predecessor American Opinion. He coauthored The Clinton Clique with Larry Abraham alleging that Bill Clinton was part of the Anglo-American conspiracy supposedly ruled through the Council on Foreign Relations and the Trilateral Commission. The Birch Society publications arm, Western Islands, published his Architects of Conspiracy: An Intriguing History (1984), and Huntington House Publishers published his Handouts and Pickpockets: Our Government Gone Berserk (1996).

In 1995, the JBS campaigned against plans for a Conference of States; proponents said such a conference would reduce federal powers. The JBS feared it would lead to a second Constitutional Convention.

=== 2000–present ===
In the mid-2000s, the JBS, along with the Eagle Forum, mobilized conservative opposition to a so-called North American Union and the Security and Prosperity Partnership of North America. As a result of two organizations' activities, 23 state legislatures saw bills introduced condemning an NAU while the Bush and Obama administrations were deterred "from any grand initiatives." In 2007, The New American published a special issue devoted to the topic; approximately 500,000 copies were distributed. The JBS also advocated for U.S. withdrawal from the UN. The JBS was a co-sponsor of the 2010 Conservative Political Action Conference (CPAC), ending its decades-long distance from the mainstream conservative movement. It attended CPAC again in 2023 and 2024.

In 2005, Robert Welch University, renamed from John Birch University in the 1990s, was approved as an online university by the Wisconsin Educational Approval Board, granting two-year associate degrees. On June 15, 2007, the university had its first graduating class. As of 2025, the university states its two-year program is paused while it works to develop a four-year degree program.

Although JBS membership numbers are kept private, it reported a resurgence of members in the 2010s and 2020s, specifically in Texas. A 2017 article in Politico describing the group's activities in Texas listed some of its stances as opposing the UN's Agenda 21 based on a conspiracy theory that it will "establish control over all human activity", opposing a bill that would allow people who entered the United States illegally to pay in-state college tuition, pulling the United States out of NAFTA, returning America to what the group calls its Christian foundations, and abolishing the federal departments of education and energy. In 2012, the Tennessee House of Representatives passed an anti-Agenda 21 resolution with nearly identical wording as a JBS model resolution.

With Donald Trump's election in 2016, the JBS "saw many of its core instincts finally reflected in the White House." Political commentator Jeet Heer argued in 2016 that "Trumpism" is essentially Bircherism, and journalist Andrew Reinbach called the JBS "the intellectual seed bank of the right." Trump confidant and longtime advisor Roger Stone said that Trump's father Fred Trump was a financier of the JBS and a personal friend of founder Robert Welch. Trump's former Chief of Staff Mick Mulvaney was the speaker at the John Birch Society's National Council dinner shortly before joining the Trump administration. Former Congressman Ron Paul (R-Texas) has had a long and close relationship with the JBS, celebrating its work in his 2008 keynote speech at its 50th anniversary event and saying that the JBS was leading the fight to restore freedom. The keynote speaker at the organization's 60th anniversary celebration was Congressman Thomas Massie (R-Kentucky), who maintained a near-perfect score on the JBS's "Freedom Index" ranking of members of Congress. Right-wing conspiracy theorist Alex Jones, who hosted Trump on his InfoWars radio show and claimed to have a personal relationship with the president, called Trump a "John Birch Society president", and previously said Trump was "more John Birch Society than the John Birch Society." Former JBS CEO Arthur R. Thompson stated, "The bulk of Trump's campaign was Birch". Trump's talk of a deep state has been described as "repeating a longtime Birch talking point." In July 2021, the Republican central committees of Kootenai County, Idaho, and Benewah County, Idaho, unanimously approved resolutions calling JBS "a valuable organization that is dedicated to restoring the Republic according to the vision of the Founding Fathers." The Idaho Republican Party declined to endorse the resolutions, though the party elected a JBS member, Dorothy Moon, as chair in July 2022. The JBS had been active in Idaho.

In the early 2020s, the JBS campaigned against carbon-capture pipelines in Iowa, arguing they threatened property rights. The JBS is affiliated with FreedomProject Academy, an online school "based on Judeo-Christian values." Between 2011 and 2020, its enrollment grew from 22 to 1,000 students. The JBS publishes the Freedom Index, which rates members of Congress and state legislators "based on their adherence to constitutional principles of limited government, fiscal responsibility, national sovereignty and a traditional foreign policy of avoiding foreign entanglements."

== Officers ==
=== Chairmen and presidents ===
- Robert W. Welch Jr. (1958–1983)
- Larry McDonald (1983), a U.S. Representative who was killed in the KAL-007 shootdown incident
- Robert W. Welch Jr. (1983–1985)
- Charles R. Armour (1985–1991)
- John F. McManus (1991–2004)
- G. Vance Smith (2004–2005)
- John F. McManus (2005–2016)
- Ray Clark (2016–2019)
- Martin Ohlson (2019–2025)
- William F. Jasper (2025–present)

=== CEOs ===
- G. Allen Bubolz (1988–1991)
- G. Vance Smith (1991–2005)
- Arthur R. Thompson (2005–2020)
- Bill Hahn (2020–2024)
- Wayne Morrow (2024–2026)

== In popular culture ==
- Pete Seeger lampooned the John Birch Society with a song called "The Jack Ash Society", recorded on his 1961 Folkways Records LP album Gazette Vol. 2. The name is a pun. On the surface, it changes the name from one type of tree, birch to another, ash. However, the name Jack Ash also sounds like the word jackass meaning 'a foolish person'.
- In 1962, Bob Dylan recorded "Talkin' John Birch Paranoid Blues", which poked fun at the society and its tendency to see Communist conspiracies in many situations. When he attempted to perform it on the Ed Sullivan Show in 1963, however, CBS's Standards and Practices department forbade it, fearing that lyrics equating the Society's views with those of Adolf Hitler might trigger a defamation lawsuit. Dylan was offered the opportunity to perform a different song, but he responded that if he could not sing the number of his choice he would rather not appear at all. The story generated widespread media attention in the days that followed; Sullivan denounced the network's decision in published interviews.
- Pogo cartoonist Walt Kelly lampooned the American anti-Communist movement, and the John Birch Society in particular, in a series of strips collected in 1962 in The Jack Acid Society Black Book.
- In 1962 The Chad Mitchell Trio recorded a satirical song, "The John Birch Society", which made its way to no. 99 in the Billboard Hot 100.
- When jazz trumpeter John Birks "Dizzy" Gillespie launched a joke presidential campaign in 1963, fans created a "John Birks Society" to campaign for him.
- In the 1964 film Dr. Strangelove, a deranged U.S. Air Force general claims that water fluoridation would "sap and impurify all of our precious bodily fluids" and is part of a communist conspiracy, a parody of JBS claims.
- The 1973 song "Uneasy Rider" by Charlie Daniels contains a reference to "Brother John Birch" in the lyrics.
- the 1986 song “Gun Sale at the Church” by The Beat Farmers contains a reference to old John Birch.
- The 2020 American miniseries Mrs. America involves a subplot in which Betty Friedan speaks out against Phyllis Schlafly's STOP ERA campaign accepting funds from the John Birch Society in episode 4, "Betty".
- In 2020, American journalist Robert Evans released a multi-part series on his podcast Behind the Bastards entitled "How The John Birch Society Invented the Modern Far Right".

== See also ==
- Granville Knight
- Rousas Rushdoony
- W. Cleon Skousen
- McCarthyism

== General and cited references ==
- Mulloy, D. J. (2014). The World of the John Birch Society: Conspiracy, Conservatism, and the Cold War. Nashville: Vanderbilt University Press. ISBN 978-0826519818.
  - Mulloy, D. J. (2014a). "1. exposure". The World of the John Birch Society: Conspiracy, Conservatism, and the Cold War. Vanderbilt University Press. pp. 15–41. doi:10.2307/j.ctv1675660. ISBN 9780826519818. JSTOR j.ctv1675660.
- Stewart, Charles J. (2002). "The Master Conspiracy of the John Birch Society: From Communism to the New World Order". Western Journal of Communication. 66 (4): 423–447. doi:10.1080/10570310209374748. S2CID 145081268.
- Verhoeven, Bart (July 2015). The Rearguard of Freedom: The John Birch Society and the Development of Modern Conservatism in the United States, 1958–1968 (PDF) (PhD). University of Nottingham.
