= Arthur R. Thompson =

American anti-communist and anti-Russian political activist

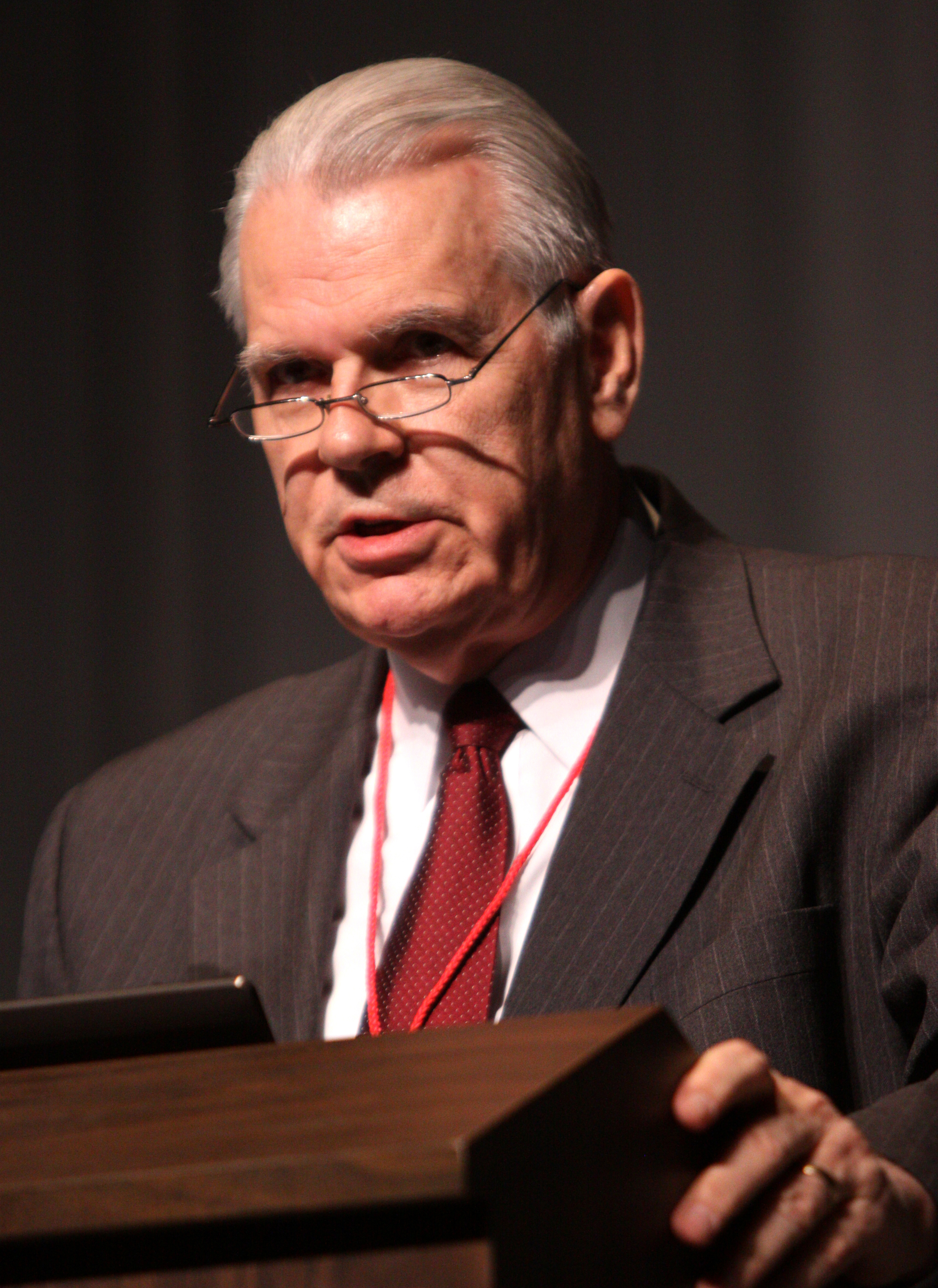
Arthur Thompson in September 2011.

Arthur R. "Art" Thompson (born 1938 in Seattle – November 2024) was a former CEO of the John Birch Society. He took office in 2005 after launching a "coup" against predecessor G. Vance Smith with the support of another of the organization's former presidents, John McManus. He was replaced as CEO by Bill Hahn in 2020.

Thompson was also CEO of FreedomProject Education, the educational arm of the American Opinion Foundation which is intended to provide online curriculum for students in grades 9 through 12 featuring an emphasis on "patriotism and the idea of American exceptionalism" which is "based on the foundation of Biblical belief" .

== Earlier career ==
Before leading the JBS, Thompson's biography reports a career as an anti-communist activist, claiming to have infiltrated Marxist organizations near his Seattle home during the 1960s.

According to his JBS biography, Thompson served on a small city council (unspecified), chaired a local Chamber of Commerce (unnamed), and held roles as a Republican Party official and elector. He was also recognized as a Washington State citizen advocate for the Christian Coalition. The biography mentions his attendance at the University of Washington and the Washington Military Academy but does not specify his graduation dates or field of study.

== Views ==
Thompson believed that Russian communism remains a serious threat to the United States, and is responsible for much global terrorism including 9/11. He has claimed a number of Islamists, including Ayman al-Zawahiri, are or were communists. He has criticised both mainstream Republicans and Tea Party movement figures, such as Sarah Palin, for failing to see the nature of the threat from Moscow. He also believed in a shadowy international conspiracy, including such bodies as the Council on Foreign Relations, the Trilateral Commission and the Rockefeller family, that threatens American interests.
