= Granville Knight =

American physician and anti-communist

- Born: Granville Frank Knight; October 12, 1904; New York City, New York, U.S.
- Died: April 1982; California, U.S
- Education: Dartmouth College (AB); Columbia University (MD)
- Occupation: Physician
- Known for: Founding member of the California John Birch Society
- Movement: Anti-communism

Granville Frank Knight (October 12, 1904 – April 1982) was an American physician and anti-communist activist, who was a leading member of the John Birch Society in California.

== Life ==
Knight was born in New York City. He received an A.B. degree from Dartmouth College in 1926 and an M.D. degree from the Columbia University College of Physicians and Surgeons in 1930. Knight specialized in ear, throat and nose disorders and allergies at his practice in White Plains, New York. He later moved to California to practice in the fields of allergies and nutrition.

== John Birch Society ==
Knight was a founding member of the John Birch Society in California from 1958-1961. "Granville proclaimed that a secular nation was condemned to tremble in fear of atomic annihilation; that it must sit and wait for the dropped curtain and the closing gate."

== Committee memberships ==
- Los Angeles County Medical Commission, 1968-1979
- President of the Price-Pottenger Nutrition Foundation
- President of the Pure Water Association of America
