= The Daily Progress =

Charlottesville, Virginia newspaper

- Type: Daily newspaper
- Format: Broadsheet
- Owner: Lee Enterprises
- Founder(s): James Hubert Lindsay and Frank Lindsay
- Publisher: Kelly Till
- Editor: Reynolds Hutchins
- Founded: September 14, 1892; 134 years ago
- Headquarters: 609 E. Market St., Ste. 104; Charlottesville, Virginia 22902
- Country: United States
- Circulation: 10,326 Daily (as of 2023)
- ISSN: 0746-0430
- OCLC number: 9701919
- Website: dailyprogress.com

The Daily Progress is a newspaper published in Charlottesville, Virginia, United States.

== History ==
The Daily Progress has been published since September 14, 1892. The paper was founded by James Hubert Lindsay and his brother Frank Lindsay. The Progress was initially published six days a week; the first Sunday edition was printed in September 1968. Lindsay's family owned the paper for 78 years. On November 30, 1970, the family announced a sale to Worrell Newspapers of Bristol, Virginia, which took over on January 1, 1971.

Worrell's founder and namesake, T. Eugene Worrell, owned about two dozen rural weekly newspapers and a few dailies, all with less circulation than the Daily Progress. However, his papers were noted for their high quality, a major factor in the Lindsays' decision to sell to him. The Progress immediately became the group's flagship paper, and Worrell moved corporate headquarters to Charlottesville. In 1979, T. Eugene Worrell split his newspaper group in order to sell most of his portfolio, including the Progress, to his son, Thomas E. Worrell, Jr. Worrell Newspapers was relocated from Charlottesville to Boca Raton, Florida, to improve management and grow the company to hold over 60 papers.

Faced with major newspaper industry changes in 1995, Worrell sold his newspaper properties to Richmond-based Media General, which was later purchased by Nexstar Media Group, as a part of a larger $230 million deal. T. Eugene, the founder of Worrell Newspapers retained his small portfolio in Bristol until 1997 and followed his son Thomas E. Worrell, Jr. to sell the remaining papers managed by the Worrell family. The buyer was Media General.

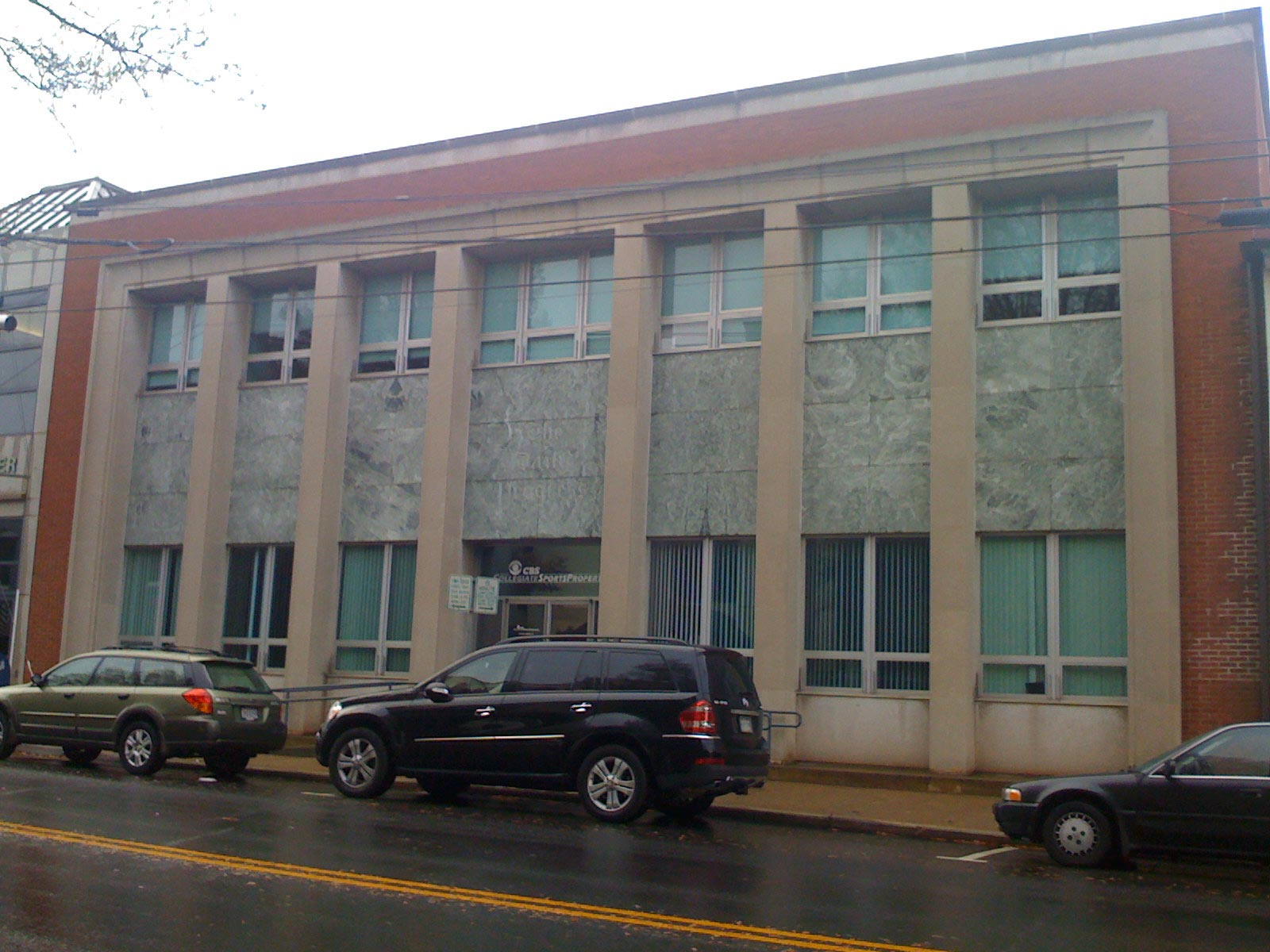
The building that long housed The Daily Progress, on Market Street in downtown Charlottesville. Worrell built a new newspaper production building in Albemarle County, and donated the downtown building to civic agencies.

In the 21st century, Media General sold the Progress' printing press, and reorganized its operations to print multiple newspapers from other printing plants it controlled.

On May 17, 2012, Media General, Inc. announced signed agreements with Berkshire Hathaway, Inc., whereby a subsidiary of Berkshire Hathaway, BH Media Group, would purchase newspapers owned by Media General, including the Progress.

Following the Unite the Right rally in Charlottesville in August 2017, Paul Chadwick of The Guardian wrote that the staff of the Progress "demonstrate in a practical, relatable way the importance of journalism to community, civil society and functioning democracy."

Ryan M. Kelly, who worked for the newspaper at the time, took a photograph of the August 12, 2017 vehicular attack that resulted in the death of Heather Heyer; it won the 2018 Pulitzer Prize for breaking news photography.

Starting June 27, 2023, the print edition of the newspaper will be reduced to three days a week: Tuesday, Thursday and Saturday. Also, the newspaper transitioned from being delivered by a traditional newspaper delivery carrier to mail delivery by the U.S. Postal Service.
