= George Harris (philosopher) =

American philosopher

George W. Harris
- Born: 1947 (age 78–79)

Education
- Education: University of Texas at Austin (PhD)
- Thesis: Moral Judgment and the Moral Point of View (1981)
- Doctoral advisor: Douglas Browning

Philosophical work
- Era: 21st-century philosophy
- Region: Western philosophy
- Institutions: College of William & Mary
- Main interests: ethics

George W. Harris (born 1947) is an American philosopher and Chancellor Professor Emeritus of Philosophy at College of William & Mary. He is known for his works on ethics.

== Books ==
- Dignity and Vulnerability, California 1997
- Agent-centered Morality, California 1999
- Reason’s Grief, Cambridge 2006
