= Marlene Wind =

Danish political scientist

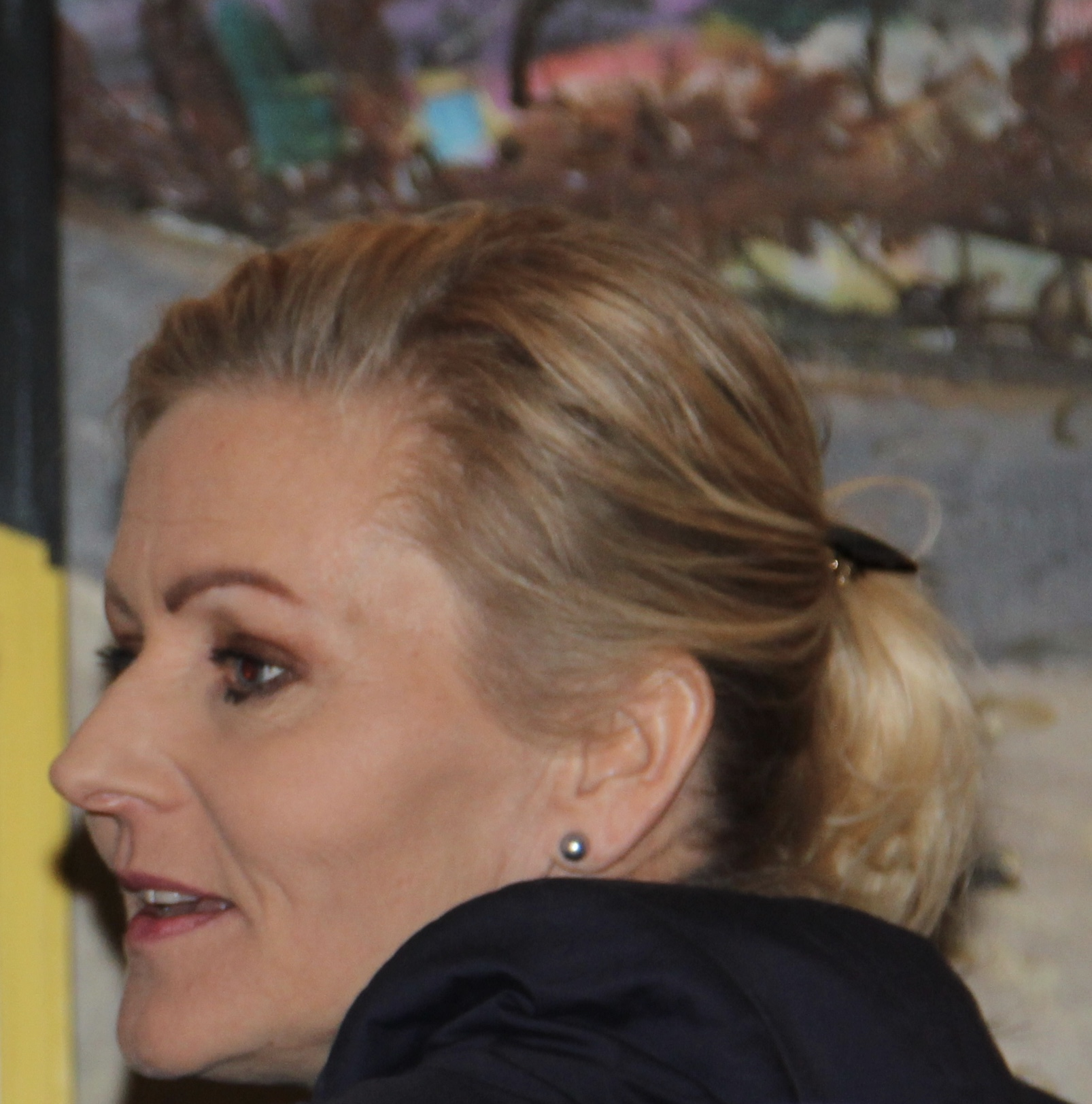
- Education: University of Massachusetts; Aarhus University; European University Institute
- Awards: Tøger Seidenfaden Prize
- Scientific career
- Fields: Political science
- Workplaces: University of Copenhagen; University of Oslo

Marlene Wind is a Danish political scientist. She is a professor of political science at the University of Copenhagen, where she has been also Director of the Center for European Policy. She specializes in the law, policies, and politics of the European Union.

== Academic career ==
Wind studied at the Royal Academy of Music, Aarhus/Aalborg, and in 1990 she graduated with a Master's Degree from the University of Massachusetts. In 1993 she obtained a Master's Degree in political science from Aarhus University. She then attended the European University Institute near Florence, where she earned her PhD in 1998.

In 1996 Wind became a research assistant at the Danish Institute of Foreign Policy (da). In 1998, she visited Harvard Law School to study with Joseph H. H. Weiler. In 1998 she became a professor in the Department of Political Science at the University of Copenhagen. That year she was also employed as a commentator at the Danish weekly newspaper Weekendavisen. In 2008, she became the Director of the Centre for European Politics at the University of Copenhagen. Wind has also held professorships at the iCourts Center at the University of Copenhagen and in the Faculty of Law at the University of Oslo. Wind specializes in the interplay between law and politics in the EU, particularly as it pertains to EU border politices.

In 2009, Wind won the European Women's Award for her work communicating about European politics. In 2012, Wind was the recipient of the inaugural Tøger Seidenfaden Prize, awarded to a European Union researcher who tirelessly disseminates knowledge about the European Union.

== Selected awards ==
- European Women's Award (2009)
- Tøger Seidenfaden Prize (2012)
