= Florida Philosophical Review =

Academic philosophy journal

- Discipline: Philosophy
- Language: English

Publication details
- Publisher: University of Central Florida (United States)
- Frequency: Annually or biannually

Standard abbreviations
- ISO 4: Fla. Philos. Rev.

Links
- Journal homepage

Florida Philosophical Review is the academic journal of the Florida Philosophical Association, an anonymously refereed electronic journal published once or twice a year by the University of Central Florida Department of Philosophy.
