= Mark Fenster =

American academic and lawyer

- Spouse: Trysh Travis (m. 2006)

Academic background
- Education: University of Virginia (BA); University of Texas at Austin (MA); University of Illinois at Urbana–Champaign (PhD); Yale University (JD)

Academic work
- Discipline: Communication studies Law
- Sub-discipline: Administrative law
- Institutions: University of Florida Levin College of Law

Mark Fenster is an American legal scholar working as Marshall M. Criser Eminent Scholar Chair in Electronic Communications and Administrative Law at the University of Florida. He is the author of The Transparency Fix: Secrets, Leaks, and Uncontrollable Government Information.

== Early life and education ==
Fenster received a Bachelor of Arts degree in English in 1985 from the University of Virginia, a Master of Arts degree in radio, television, and film from the University of Texas at Austin in 1988, a PhD in communications from the University of Illinois at Urbana–Champaign in 1992, and a Juris Doctor from Yale Law School in 1998.

== Career ==
Fenster served as a law clerk for Judge Carlos F. Lucero and worked as an environmental and land use lawyer at Shute Mihaly & Weinberger in San Francisco. He joined the University of Florida Levin College of Law in 2001.

== Personal life ==
Fenster married Trysh Travis, a professor of women's studies, in 2006.
