= August 2025 Indonesian protests =

- 2025 nation-wide Indonesian demonstrations Part of the 2025–2026 Indonesian protests and post-Suharto era in Indonesia
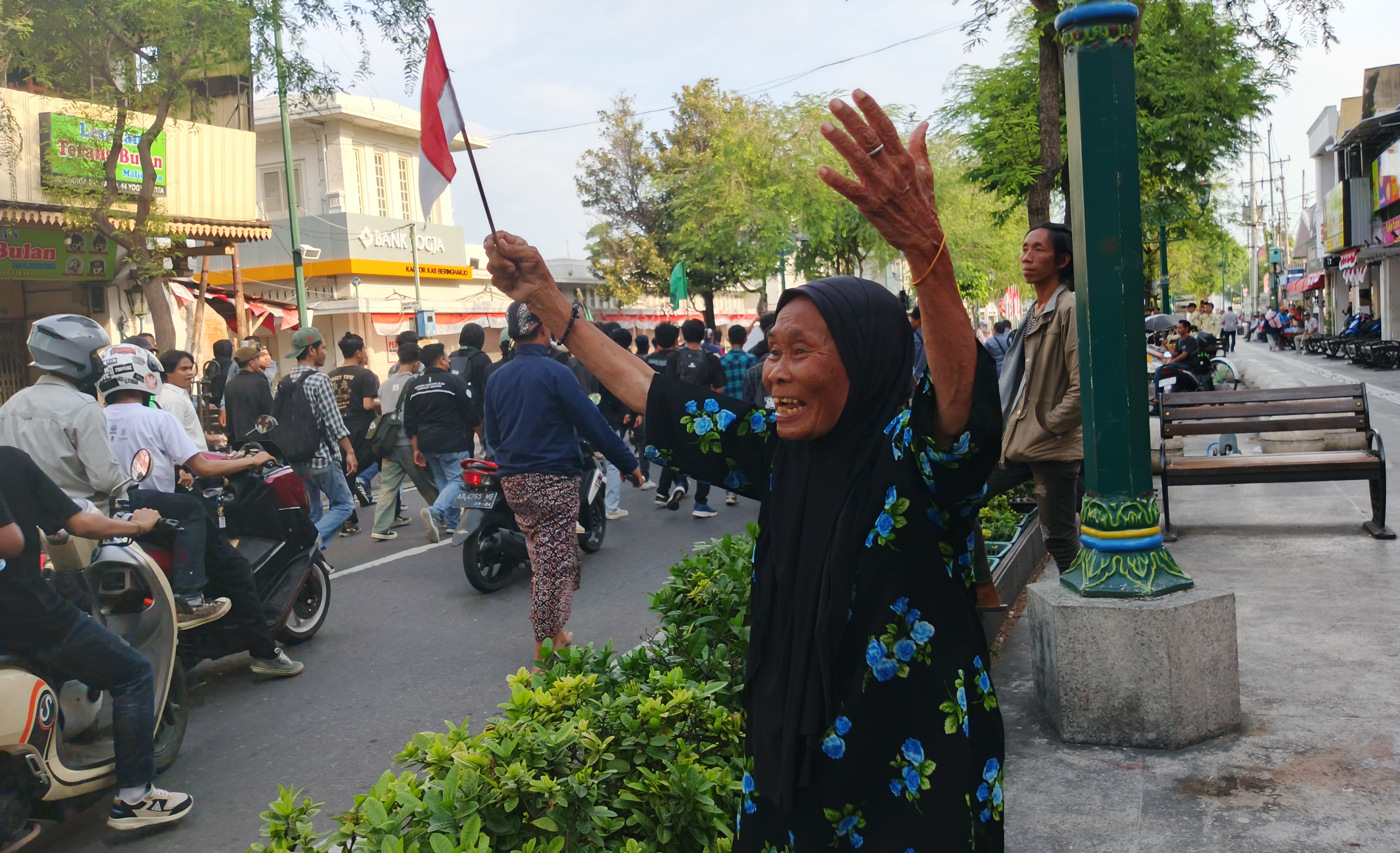
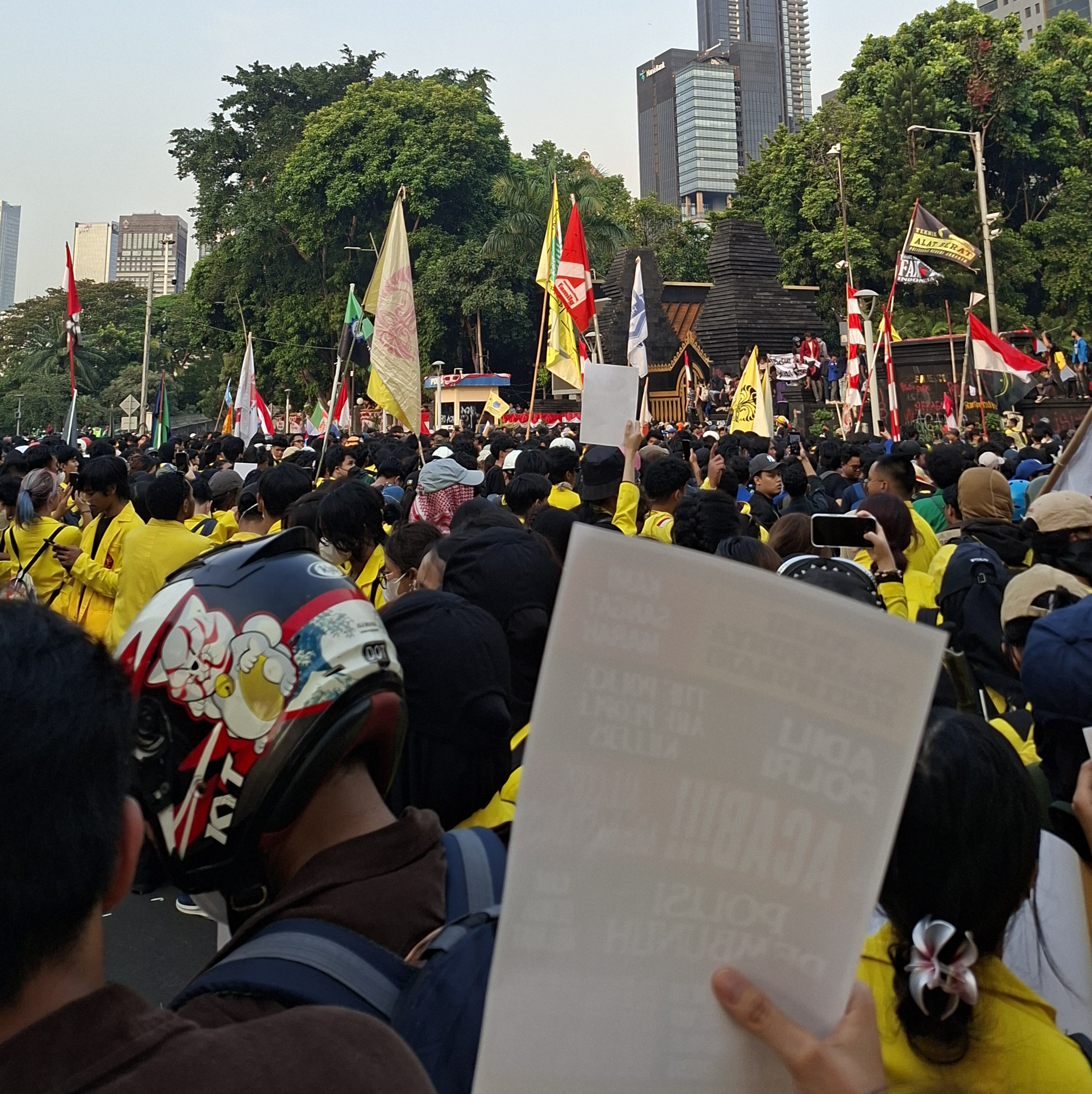
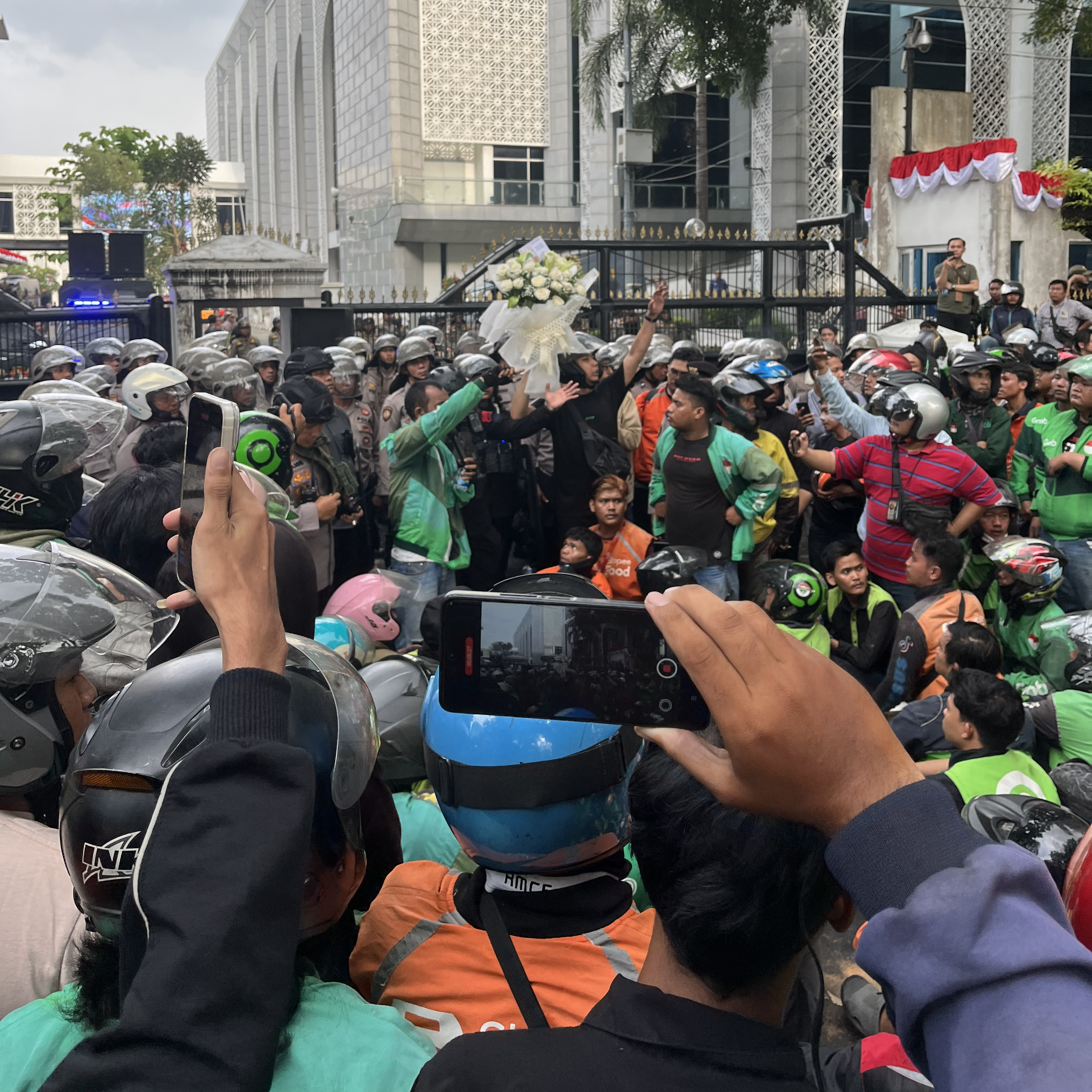
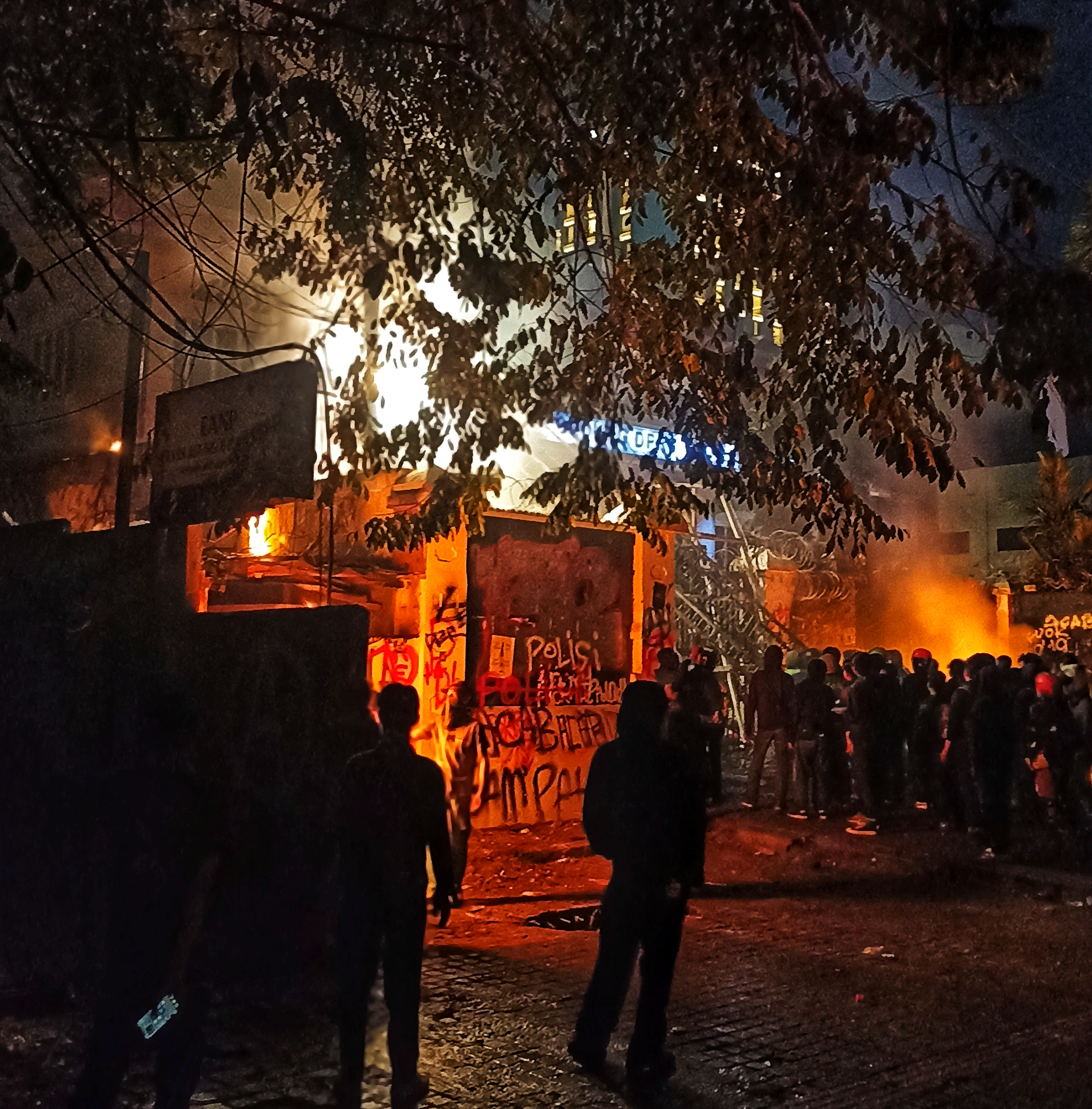
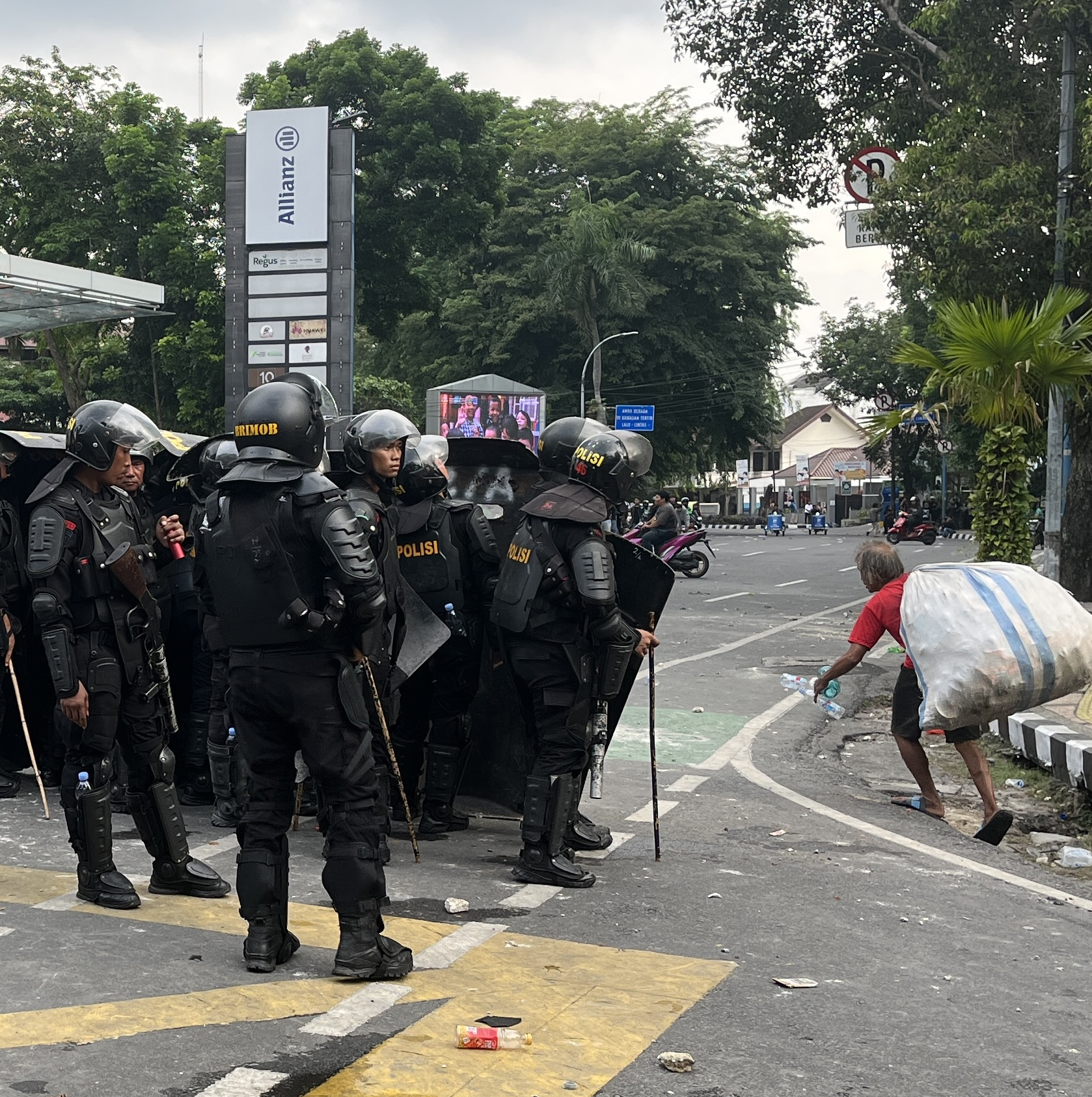
- Clockwise from top: An elderly woman cheering on passing protestors in Yogyakarta; Motorcycle taxi drivers protesting in front of the North Sumatra parliament gate; Riot police ready a blockade as a man scavenges for plastic bottles in Medan; West Java parliament after being torched by protesters; Students protesting in front of the Jakarta police headquarters
- Date: 25 August 2025 – 9 September 2025 (2 weeks and 2 days)
- Location: Indonesia, with solidarity protests in Malaysia, Thailand, Germany, Australia, the United States, and Netherlands
- Caused by: House of Representatives (DPR) allowance hike; Circulated hoax video about alleged insensitive House of Representatives members statements; Food and education cost rise; Mass layoffs; Property tax hike; Death of Affan Kurniawan by a police tactical vehicle
- Goals: Dissolution of the parliament; Resignation of the police chief; Reform of the Indonesian National Police; Passage of the Confiscation of Assets Act; Revocation of DPR allowance hike
- Methods: Demonstrations; Internet activism; Student activism; Sit-in; Vandalism; Riots; Arsons; Lootings
- Result: Largely unsuccessful movement: Minimal policies change and substances reform; Damage to several local government buildings, public facilities, and looting of several officials' houses; Thousands of protesters arrested; ten people being killed, four of the total are non-protesters.; Reactivation of Siskamling civil force and Community-Based Security squad
- Concessions: Five DPR members suspended (Note: Ahmad Sahroni and Nafa Urbach from Nasdem, Uya Kuya and Eko Patrio from PAN, and Adies Kadir from Golkar.); Government agrees to reduce' allowance for lawmakers; Police commissioner who killed Affan dishonorably discharged; Government proposal to form Police Reform Commission; Red and White Cabinet reshuffle, including the Minister of Finance, Sri Mulyani; Purbaya Yudhi Sadewa sworn in as the replacement

Parties
Protesters (no centralized authority): Students' unions; All-Indonesian Students' Union; Muslim Students' Association; Indonesian National Student Movement; Indonesian Muslim Students' Movement; Indonesian Christian Student Movement; Labor unions; Indonesian Trade Union Confederation; Congress of Indonesia Unions Alliance; Confederation of All Indonesian Workers' Unions; Indonesian Workers Welfare Union; Labor Party; Motorcycle taxi drivers; Indonesian Arab protesters; (Palestine) Palestinian protesters	(Indonesia) Government; Indonesian National Police; Mobile Brigade Corps; Civil Order Corps; Anti-Anarchist Law Enforcement Task Force; Municipal Police; Indonesian Armed Forces; Indonesian Army; Indonesian Navy; Indonesian Marine Corps; Indonesian Air Force; Quick Reaction Forces Corps; Military Police Corps; State Intelligence Agency; Anti-protest civil movements: Nahdlatul Ulama; Ansor Youth Movement; Banser militia; Thousands of Muhammadiyah youths and local pencak silat martial-artists in East Java; Real estate anti-riot residents; Pecalang

Lead figures
No centralized leadership; Students' unions: Muzzamil Ihsan; Labor unions: Andi Gani Nena Wea; Elly Rosita Silaban; Labor Party: Said Iqbal	Prabowo Subianto Gibran Rakabuming Raka Listyo Sigit Prabowo Agus Subiyanto Muhammad Herindra Puan Maharani Adies Kadir; Banser: Addin Jauharudin

Casualties and losses
4 deaths (Note: Two student protesters: Rheza Sendy Pratama in Yogyakarta on 31 August, Andika Lutfi Falah in Jakarta on 2 September, and two non-student protesters Muhammad Farhan Hamid and Reno Syahputra Dewo, whose bodies were found on 30 October and identified on 7 November, likely died within a building which set ablaze by their fellow protesters.) >3,000 arrested, (Note: 351 arrested on 25 August, 39 on 26 August, 600 on 28 August, 1,334 on 29 August, 1,029 on 30 August (327 in Semarang, 132 in Denpasar, 143 in Blitar, 147 in Bandung, 87 in Pontianak, 61 in Malang, 44 in Magelang, and 38 in Ciamis, and 65 on 31 August.) with 55 made suspects.	Several injured
- Non protestors: 6 killed (Note: Affan Kurniawan on 28 August, three people at the Makassar DPRD building and a becak driver in Surakarta on 29 August, Rusdamdiansyah in Makassar on 30 August.); 1 motorcycle taxi driver heavily injured

Map showing several main epicenters of the riots in Indonesia on August 29, 2025

From 25 August until early September 2025, several protests took place in Indonesia as part of a larger civil unrest which began in early 2025 over economic frustrations and a proposed hike in housing subsidies for members of parliament. Protesters initially demanded the House of Representatives reverse its subsidy schemes and penalize its members who made insensitive statements, as well as pass the Confiscation of Assets Act for lawmakers convicted of corruption.

== Background ==
During a break in the 2025 Annual Session of the DPR and DPD, several members of parliament were shown dancing (except Gibran Rakabuming Raka, the Vice President of Indonesia), which drew mass criticism from netizens amid economic hardship (15 August 2025).

Protests in Indonesia erupted over a proposed Rp 50 million (US$3,057) monthly housing allowance for House of Representatives (DPR) members—ten times Jakarta's minimum wage—plus existing food and transportation stipends. This ignited public fury amid soaring food and education costs, mass layoffs, and property tax increases from central funding cuts.

A BBC Indonesia report pegged House of Representatives (DPR) members' monthly earnings at over Rp 100 million (US$6,062), including the allowance. However, the Indonesian Forum for Budget Transparency (FITRA) NGO argued the figure understated take-home pay at Rp 230 million (US$13,942.60) per month, or Rp 2.8 billion (US$169,736) annually, based on the 2023–2025 DPR Budget Implementation List (DIPA). The total budget for 580 members' salaries and allowances is projected at Rp 1.6 trillion in 2025, up from Rp 1.2 trillion in 2023 and Rp 1.8 trillion in 2024. Former Chief Justice and Minister Mahfud MD disputed claims of sub-Rp 250 million monthly pay, estimating totals could reach billions of rupiah per member.

Outrage intensified with tone-deaf comments from MPs. NasDem Party's representative Nafa Urbach backed the hike, citing commuting woes, but apologized amid backlash and pledged her allowance to constituents. Commission III deputy chairman Ahmad Sahroni branded dissolution calls "from the dumbest people in the world," later claiming it meant "smart"—his whereabouts remain unknown. National Mandate Party's Eko Patrio shared a parody video seen as mocking public hardships.

== Timeline ==
=== 25 August ===
==== Jakarta ====
On 25 August, students from Indraprasta PGRI University demonstrated in front of the MPR/DPR/DPD building. They demanded the forced dissolution of the DPR. At this location, police fired tear gas. Some of the protesters fled. However, the student protesters continued to deliver speeches, leading to the demonstration becoming chaotic. A joint security force of 1,250 personnel was deployed to secure the protest, preventing clashes with the protesters. Police even had to close Jalan Jenderal Gatot Subroto in front of the DPR building due to the demonstration by various elements of the protesters.

==== Outside Jakarta ====
On 25 August 2025, protests spread to Medan, North Sumatra. Thousands of students, workers, and ride-hailing drivers protested, urging the central government to scrap new tax policies. Violence erupted when police blocked access to the North Sumatra Regional House of Representatives, prompting protesters to burn tires and set up barricades, leading to clashes with dozens injured on both sides.

=== 27 August ===
On 27 August, protesters under the command of the Tanjungpura University's student council stormed the West Kalimantan House of Representatives, voicing their opposition to the increase in House of Representatives member allowances. Fifteen protesters were arrested by the provincial police under the guise of resistance and damage to public property. The arrested protesters were released two days later after signing statements promising not to repeat their actions.

=== 28 August ===
Protests near the parliament complex building, Pejompongan, Central Jakarta

Protests in the Bendungan Hilir, Tanah Abang area

On 28 August, thousands of demonstrators, primarily students, political activists, and labor union members, clashed with police in Jakarta outside the House of Representatives. The protest, led by labor groups like the Coalition of Labor Unions and the Labor Party, began with six major demands, including ending outsourcing, raising minimum wages, halting mass layoffs, and reforming labor taxes. Although the labor protest initially ended peacefully, subsequent demonstration by students escalated into violence.

Students tried to scale the parliament fence and threw objects at the building, leading police to deploy tear gas and water cannons. Clashes spread from the parliament to a nearby shopping district, expressway, and railway, disrupting public transport and closing Palmerah and Tanah Abang stations. Police arrested a student near Plaza Senayan and Senayan City malls, sparking outrage among mall visitors. The student was later freed by visitors and security guards at Senayan City, which was secured with barbed wire.

==== Outside Jakarta ====
Protests with similar demands also occurred in Gorontalo, Surabaya, Sidoarjo, Mojokerto, and Medan. In Banda Aceh, labor representatives met with provincial government officials and demanded the raise of minimum wages, abolition of outsourcing, and the formation of a task force to handle unilateral layoffs.

An elderly woman standing in front of riot police on 28 August 2025, in Senayan, became a symbol of resistance.

The Lokataru Foundation estimated that at least 600 students were arrested during protests across Indonesia. According to Tempo magazine, students detained in Jakarta were forced to squat-walk five meters before receiving packaged rice. Police promised counseling and supervision for those arrested. In Bogor, police intercepted a total of 197 students who were about to depart to Jakarta for the protests. According to the police, the students were being mobilized and coordinated via a WhatsApp group that demanded them to pay ten thousand rupiahs each to buy spray paint. A letter circulated by the Jakarta Broadcasting Commission urged major media outlets to limit their coverage of the protests, which sparked criticism from several media personalities. The commission's chairman later denied issuing such letter, which was corroborated by the minister of communications and digital Meutya Hafid. Farhan Nuzhadiwansyah, a social media observer, noted the presence of a Cessna plane allegedly owned by the National Agency for Disaster Countermeasure circling Jakarta. The plane was accused of being used to prevent further protests by creating heavy rain via cloud seeding. The agency's chief Suharyanto denied the allegation and stated that the national weather agency, BMKG, had predicted heavy rain beforehand.

The 28 August labor protest resulted in the government agreeing to create a task force to address mass layoffs as well as a government body named Labor Welfare Council. The protests initially died down until the news and image of the killing of a motorcycle taxi driver, Affan Kurniawan, surfaced later at night.

==== Killing of Affan Kurniawan ====
Killing of Affan Kurniawan
- Part of the 2025 Indonesian protests
- Location: 6°12′6″S 106°48′27″E; Jalan Penjernihan I, Bendungan Hilir, Tanah Abang, Central Jakarta, Jakarta, Indonesia
- Date: 28 August 2025 c. 19:00–20:30 Western Indonesian Time (UTC+7)
- Attack type: Death by collision with a police armored vehicle
- Victim: Affan Kurniawan
- Perpetrator: 7 Mobile Brigade Corps members

On the night of 28 August, protesters who remained in the front of the parliament building withdrew to the Angkola Protestant Christian Church in the Pejompongan area after being pushed back by the Mobile Brigade, the police's paramilitary force, using tear gas and rubber bullets. In the midst of the chaos, a Rimueng 4x4 armored vehicle of the Mobile Brigade, which drove through the protesters, ran over and killed a 21-year-old Gojek-partnered motorcycle taxi driver Affan Kurniawan. Videos from various vantage points circulating on social media show the tactical armored vehicle stopping after hitting Affan, but then continued driving after being surrounded by crowds of angered civilians, who tried to beat and throw stones at the car running over Affan. Affan was immediately taken to Dr. Cipto Mangunkusumo Hospital (RSCM), but died soon after. After the incident, the angered civilians chased the tactical vehicle through the flyover at Casablanca Street. Protesters soon encircled the Mobile Brigade's headquarters in the Central Jakarta district of Kwitang.

Besides Affan Kurniawan, it was reported that there was another person falling victim to similar circumstances named Moh Umar Amarudin, who was also an online motorcycle taxi driver partnered with Grab. Umar sustained severe injuries and was initially reported dead, but this was later corrected. As of early 29 August, he was conscious, though seriously injured, and receiving intensive care at Pelni Hospital, Palmerah, West Jakarta.

Affan's death sparked strong reactions from a community of online motorcycle taxi drivers alike as well as the wider public, both expressing condolences for his death along with harsh criticism and hate towards the Mobile Brigade and the police institution due to this accident has added more victims for cases of police brutality towards civilian. His funeral was held on 29 August at Karet Bivak Cemetery, escorted by many motorcycle taxi drivers as means to pay respect and solidarity. The funeral was attended by notable people, including former Jakarta governor Anies Baswedan, chief of Jakarta police Asep Edi Suheri, and entrepreneur Jusuf Hamka. Asep's presence, in particular, was met with intense anger from fellow ojol drivers, who shouted "murderer" and "enemy" as well as throwing water bottles and attempted to breach security to confront him directly as he left the cemetery. Indonesian netizens also expressed disappointment in the already-unpopular police, with the hashtag #PolisiPembunuhRakyat (roughly "#PoliceKillsPeople") became the top trending hashtag on X for the last 24 hours. His death was compared to the 1989 Tiananmen Square massacre in China. The incident was captured on video and went viral, igniting outrage and leading to further unrest. In response, a crowd of protesters, including Affan's fellow ojek drivers, gathered at the police's Mobile Brigade headquarters, burning cars and throwing rocks.

On the same night, the Head of the Indonesian National Police's Professional and Security Division, Inspector General Abdul Karim, revealed that they had arrested seven Brimob members involved in the collision that resulted in the death of Affan Kurniawan. As one of the members of the National Police Commission (Kompolnas), he called on the police to be transparent and fair in handling Affan's death and to impose strict sentence on the officers involved. Jakarta police chief Asep Edi Suhari later revealed the names of the seven involved officers: Police Second Inspector M. Rohyani, Police First Constable Danang, Police Second Constable Mardin, Police Chief Patrolman Jana Edi, Police Chief Patrolman Yohanes David, Police Commissioner Cosmas Kaju, and Police Chief Brigadier Rohmat. Two officers were sitting in the front of the vehicle while the other five were in the back. Rohmat, who was identified as the driver, claimed that he was trying to protect his colleagues within the vehicle and feared that stopping would endanger them all. He also cited poor visibility due to smoke and tinted windows despite having used the front spotlights, and an urgency to escape the crowd as he claimed the crowd was attacking with rocks and Molotov cocktails. He drove away assuming that what he was driving over were rocks as the road was "full of rocks". All were found to have violated police ethics and sentenced to a twenty-day special detention, subject to extension for further investigation.

Map of the spread of riots following the death of Affan Kurniawan
Map of Indonesia (outside Java) showing locations where major protests occurred
Map of Indonesia (Java) showing locations where major protests occurred

=== 29 August ===
Protests continued with demonstrators, mostly from students and motorcycle taxi drivers, demanding accountability for Affan's death. New demonstrations were planned in Jakarta and other Indonesian cities. The All-Indonesia Students' Union called for protests against police brutality, while the Jakarta provincial government pledged to assist with Affan's funeral.

In Tangerang, local police conducted patrols in train stations and toll gates to prevent students from the region joining the protests.

Hundreds of Universitas Indonesia students, as well as those from other universities in the Jakarta region, staged a demonstration outside the national police headquarters, demanding the removal of the police chief. Prior to their departure, the rector of the university briefed the students, stating that the university "never approved protests, but respected democracy".

The All-Indonesia Students' Executive Board also organized a march from FX Sudirman to the Jakarta Metropolitan Police headquarters, protesting the repressive actions of the authorities. Riot police again used tear gas to disperse crowds, which had gathered at the Mobile Brigade headquarters. The protests led to the closure of major roads, and many companies instructed their employees to work from home.

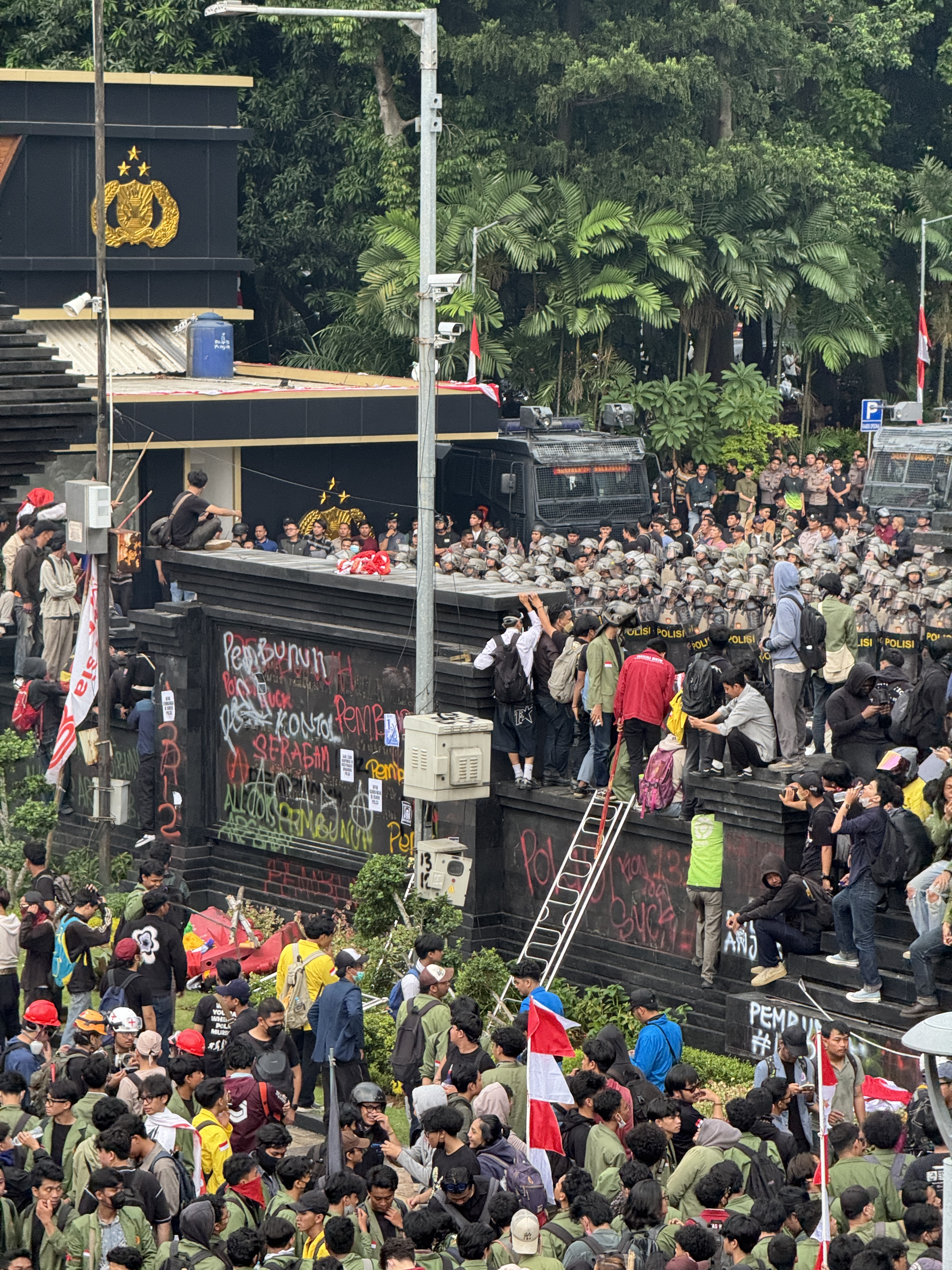
Student protestors surround the National Police headquarters amidst the killing of Affan Kurniawan, 29 August 2025

In response to the riots in front of the Mobile Brigade headquarters, Korps Marinir and Kostrad forces were deployed to form barricades between the crowd and Brimob and calm down the protesters. Marine and Kostrad members evacuated eight burned vehicles from the protest site. Kostrad intelligence assistant Brigadier General Muhammad Nas later negotiated with motorcycle taxi drivers, promising to relay their demands to the national police and urged demonstrators not to relocate their protest elsewhere.

The protesters in Jakarta received medical support from the alumni association of the University of Indonesia's medical faculty, which also condemned the mobile brigade's involvement in the death of Affan Kurniawan.

Around 16:00 WIB, there were reports of looting in a shop around the Senen area after police fired tear gas against protesters.

Around 17:00 WIB, tensions in protests near the parliament building escalated with firecrackers being thrown into the parliamentary complex and CCTVs near the complex being damaged. An hour later, heavy rain forced a majority of protesters to seek shelter, although some protesters stood their ground.

Protests in Jakarta persisted into the night, with demonstrators breaching a gate near the Secretariat General of the Regional Representative Council (DPD RI) around 20:00 (WIB) Security forces, including Brimob and TNI, responded by pushing the crowd back and establishing physical barriers to replace the damaged gate.

Throughout the night, suspected infiltrators set fire to and looted the Senen Toyota Rangga stations near the Mobile Brigade headquarters in Senen and the Polda Metro Jaya station located in front of Jakarta regional police headquarters, as well as the Senayan Bank Jakarta bus stop near the Gelora Bung Karno Stadium complex. In addition, the Istora Mandiri and Senayan Mastercard MRT stations received serious damage. As a result of the protests, Transjakarta suspended its operations citywide at 22:11 WIB, while MRT Jakarta operated a shortened service from Lebak Bulus to Blok M BCA.

==== Outside Jakarta ====
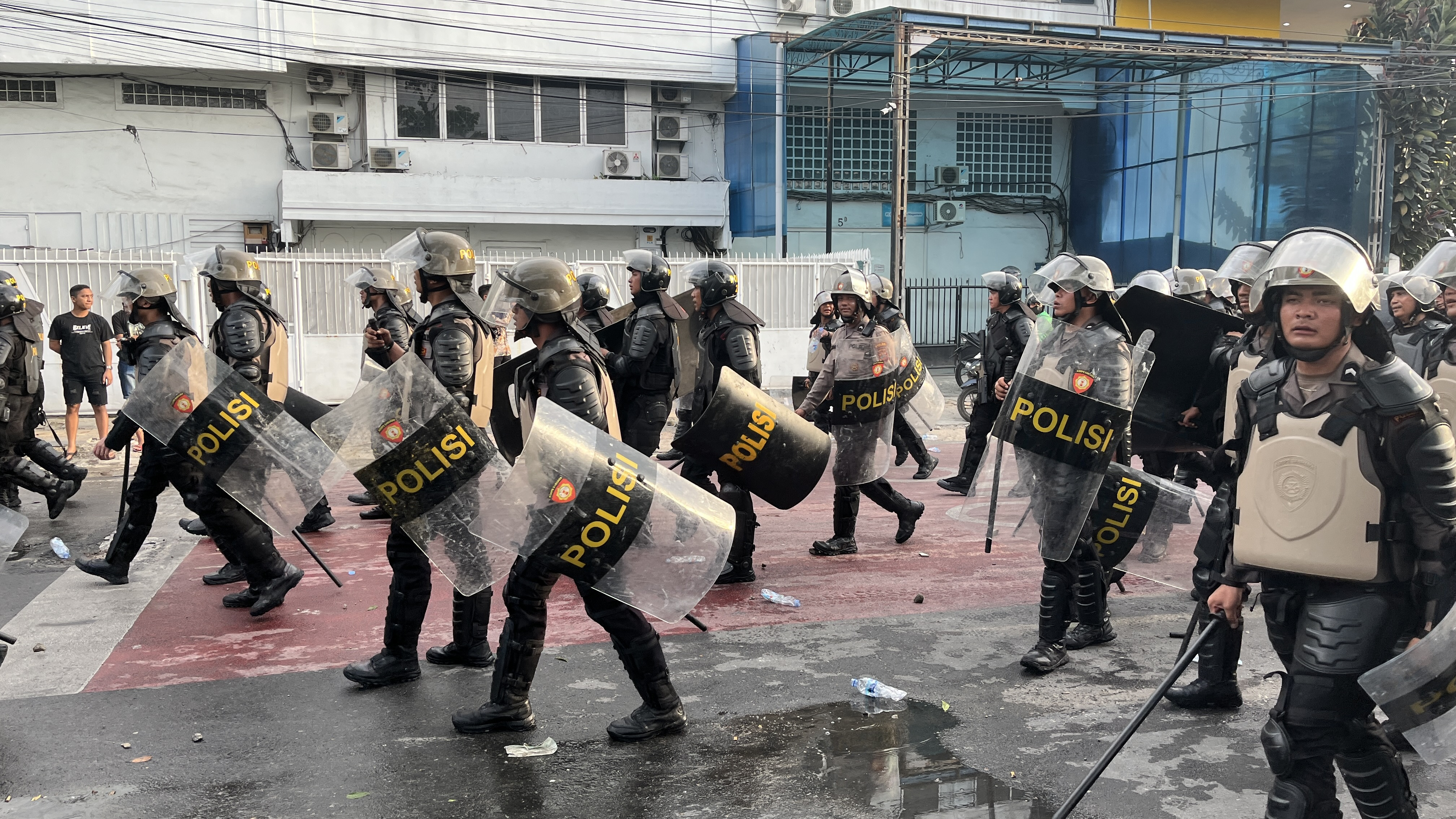
Riot Police pushing protesters back in Medan, 29 August 2025

Protests on the death of Affan Kurniawan also occurred in Banda Aceh, Medan, Sukabumi, Surabaya, Surakarta, Pontianak, Makassar, Gorontalo, Palu, Padang, Jambi, Bandung, Cirebon, Indramayu, Tasikmalaya, Purwokerto, Semarang, Yogyakarta, Kudus, Demak, Tuban, Sidoarjo, Malang, Probolinggo, Jember, Kediri, Banyuwangi, Palangka Raya, Banjarmasin, Kendari, Manokwari, and Manado.

In Bandung, West Java, protesters burned the official residence of the MPR and destroyed water barriers. West Java governor Dedi Mulyadi went directly to the protesters and asked them to not attack Gedung Sate and other protected historical buildings in Bandung. Dedi was nearly attacked and sustained a light injury on his temple after an object was hurled at him, but he eventually managed to conduct a dialogue with the protestors. Three policewomen were injured by rocks, and around 200 protesters sought medical attention, primarily due to tear gas exposure. The ensuing riot resulted in West Java parliament building as well as neighbouring police stations, parts of Gedung Sate, and a restaurant nearby burned down and looted. Vandalism of police signs and stations as well as attacks on police stations also occurred in Jatinangor, Sumedang Regency.

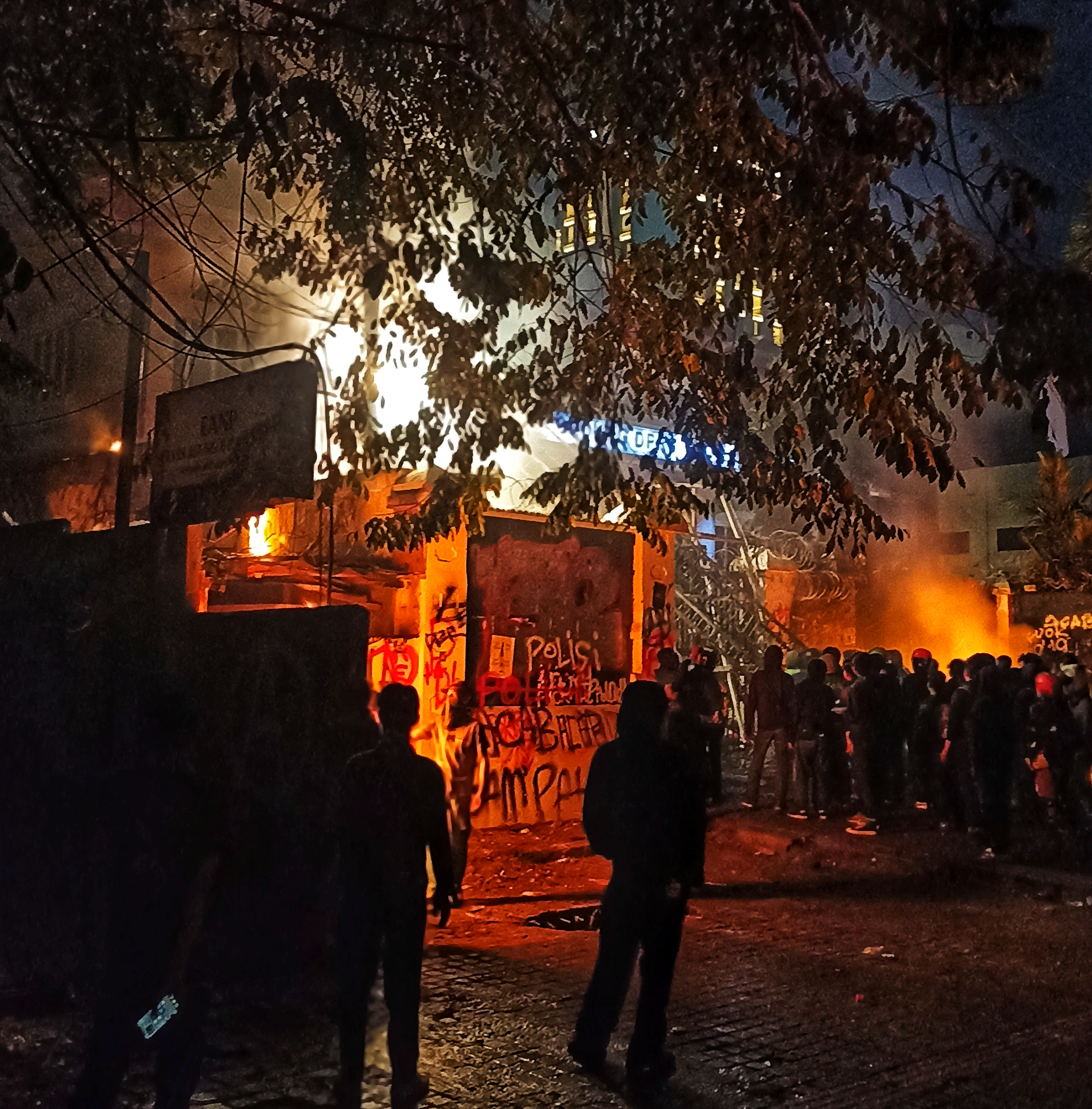
Mass protests at the West Java Regional House of Representatives, Bandung. The building later suffered severe damage from fire.

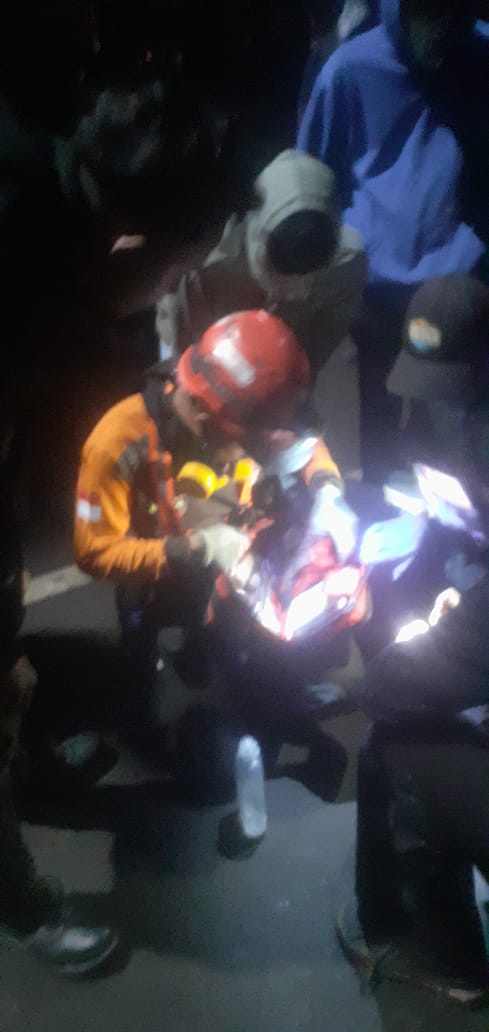
A student medic volunteer for protesters in Bandung, West Java. Many protesters were injured by exposure to tear gas.

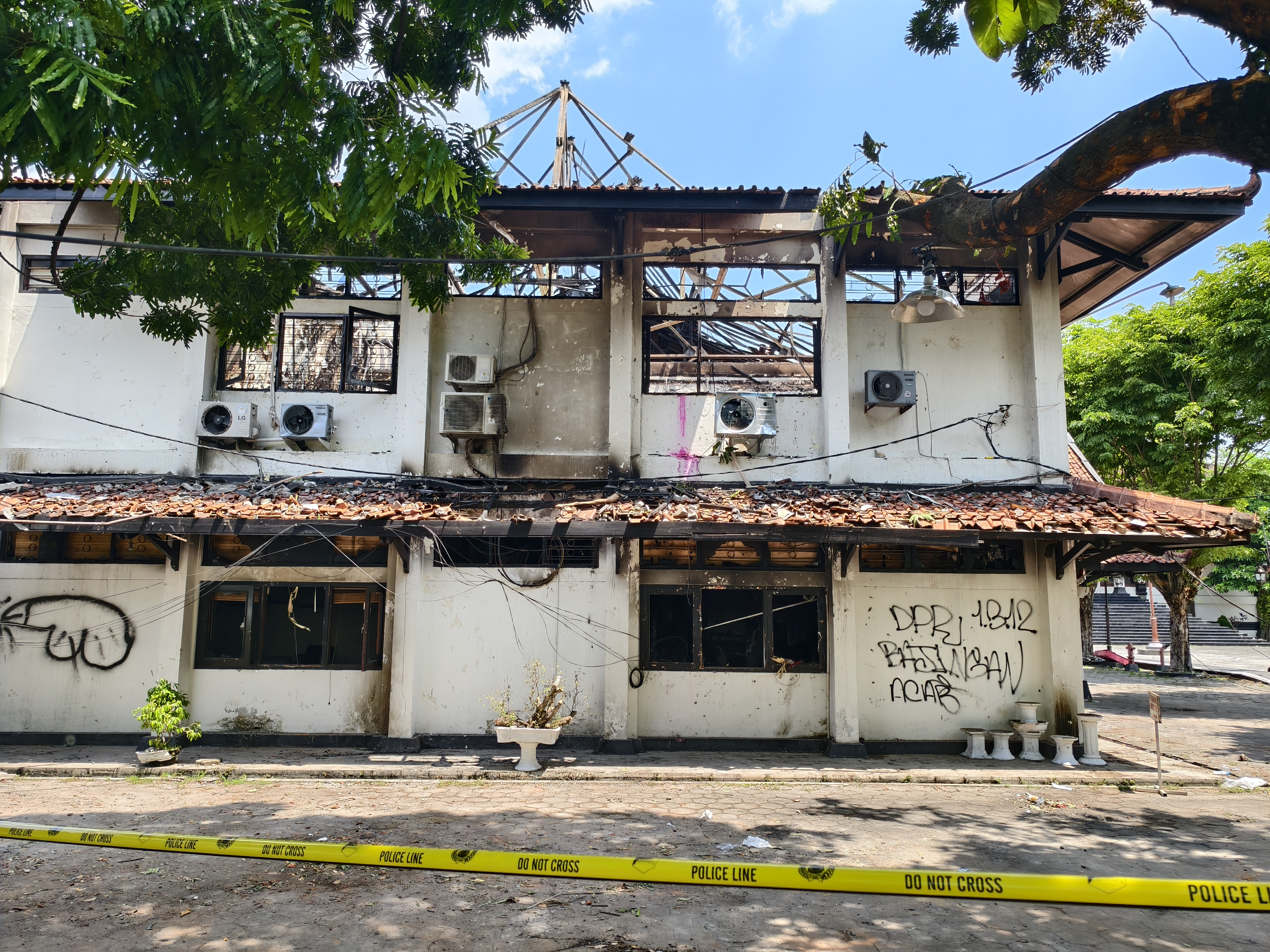
Burned city council secretary building in Surakarta

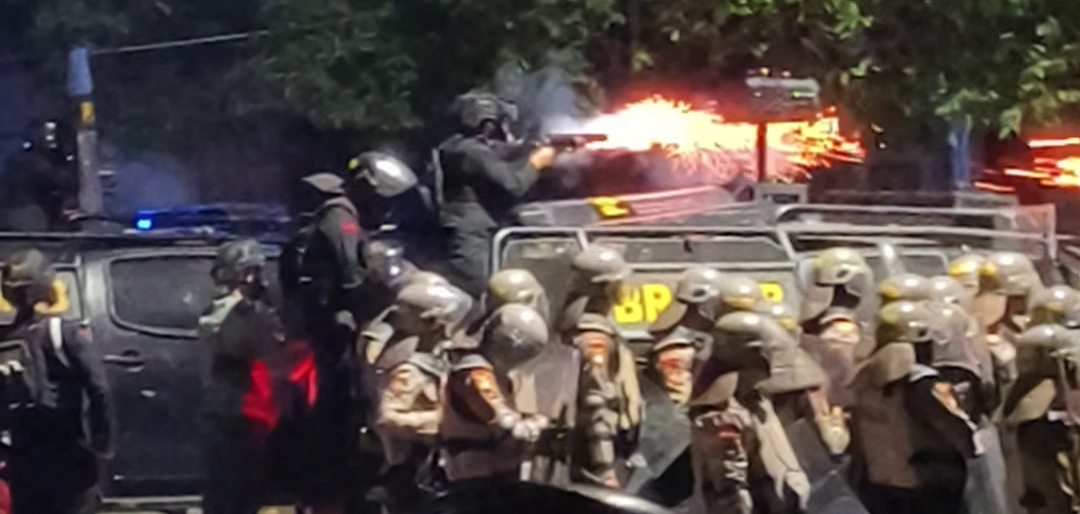
Police shooting tear gas at demonstrators at Slamet Riyadi St in Surakarta

In Surakarta, protesters gathered in front of the Brimob battalion headquarters in Manahan, led by online motorcycle taxi drivers and students. Demonstrators and police initially held a joint prayer in solidarity before tensions escalated into a full-fledged clash. Brimob officers attempted to disperse the crowd using tear gas and water cannons. However, the tear gas blew back toward the Brimob unit due to a sudden change in wind direction, causing chaos and forcing them to retreat. The unrest continued into the night and was reportedly infiltrated by provocateurs who vandalized and damaged public facilities. Surakarta's city council (DPRD) secretary building was set on fire by rioters, and ten people received treatment for tear gas exposure.

In Surabaya, protesters demanded the release and compensation for those detained the previous day, as well as the dismissal and trial of police involved in Affan Kurniawan's death. They threw objects and suspected Molotov cocktails at police, sparking a fire on the eastern side of Grahadi and the East Java Provincial Government Office, which burned several motorcycles and produced thick black smoke. Banser (Nahdlatul Ulama's militia) and Pemuda Muhammadiyah were mobilized to block student protesters near Gedung Negara Grahadi and Mapolda Jatim, per BBC reports. Led by figures like Addin Jauharudin, Banser's patrols with police intimidated PMII-affiliated students, limiting protest access. Muhammadiyah Youth's peace calls were seen as pro-authority, creating horizontal tension. No clashes occurred, but those Counter protest mobs' presence dispersed crowds, aiding de-escalation amid dozens injured and 110 arrests.

As of about 19:31 WIB, protests were still ongoing in Surabaya. Demonstrators, who had been pushed back from Gubernur Suryo Street, dispersed into Basuki Rahmat Street and Pemuda Street, continuing to throw stones at police and setting road barriers ablaze. Fires broke out at two points: in front of Tegalsari police sector and in front of a McDonald's. Police officers, equipped with ballistic shields, maintained their positions. The unrest forced several fast-food outlets like Richeese and McDonald's to close, as well as nearby car dealerships in Basuki Rahmat and the well known Tunjungan Plaza. Traffic in the city center was brought to a standstill, and police continued to fire tear gas to disperse the crowd. The unrest also caused several city bus routes to be rerouted, and eventually stopped entirely before 21:00 WIB with no clear resumption.

In Pontianak, protesters voiced for the rejection of parliament member allowance increase, dismissal of the Pontianak police chief over alleged police brutality in previous protests, demand equitable development across West Kalimantan, push for the ratification of the Asset Seizure Bill, and hold the government accountable for its promise to create job opportunities. Protesters attempted to storm the provincial house of representatives building and burned tires, prompting the police to intervene using tear gas and tactical vehicles to disperse the crowd.

In Makassar, protesters blocked the Trans-Sulawesi Highway by burning waste tires. At night, they burned down the Makassar DPRD complex, including cars and motorcycles that were parked there. The protesters also damaged ATMs near its guardhouse. The incident halted a plenary session and its participants were evacuated from the fire, including Makassar mayor Munafri Arifuddin. Three people were killed and five others were injured in the fire. On the evening of 30 August, another online motorcycle taxi driver in Makassar named Rusdamdiansyah was killed during a demonstration that turned violent in front of the UMI campus in Makassar. The Head of the Makassar Regional Disaster Management Agency (BPBD), M. Fadli Tahar, previously stated that a victim was found dead after being attacked by a mob in front of the UMI (Islamic University of Makassar) campus. He said the victim was attacked by other demonstrators because they suspected him of being a law enforcement intelligence officer.

In Kendari, protesters broke the Southeast Sulawesi Regional Police building gate while also holding demonstrations around the governor's office and the regional parliament building. The protesters, mainly students from Southeast Sulawesi University and Southeast Sulawesi State Islamic Institute threatened to hold larger demonstration on 1 September before withdrawing.

In Yogyakarta, protesters gathered into the night at the front of the provincial police headquarters. The riots resulted in the police's integrated driving license service building being set alight. The protesters, who initially blocked the road into the police headquarters, made way for Sultan Hamengkubuwono X's car, who visited the compound along with his two daughters. The Sultan later met with representatives of the police and army inside the headquarters to discuss the ongoing protests and defuse the tensions.

In Bengkulu, the protest led by students and youth organizations were initially peaceful as 30 representatives from students were allowed to meet with the province's parliament members. However, later at noon it turned violent as the protesters pushed back police and tried to remove the building's fence and flag pole decorations. The police responded with tear gas and arrested 7 students who were shortly later released. The protesters dispersed later that day after it starts raining. As the result of the riot, reportedly 10 police personnels, including one with stabbing wound, and dozens of students were injured and treated in nearby hospitals.

=== 30 August ===
Following Affan Kurniawan's death the previous day, protesters in Jakarta again held demonstrations in front of the Kwitang Mobile Brigade Korps office. The situation escalated as security forces and demonstrators exchanged blows, with protesters throwing bottles, rocks, and even firecrackers. The situation became increasingly tense after that, security officers deliberately turned off the electricity in the area, they fired guns and tear gas, making the demonstrators run backwards.

Protests continued throughout 30 August in Jakarta, Surabaya, Madiun, Cirebon, Mataram, Denpasar, Serang, Pekalongan, and Pontianak.

Demonstrations in front of Kwitang Mobile Brigade Headquarters

On the morning of 30 August, demonstrations continued in Jakarta, but their numbers had substantially decreased by 6:00 WIB. Hundreds of people remained in front of the parliament complex as of 5:00 WIB. Some were seen shouting at the police officers standing guard behind the DPR fence. A number of road users such as taxis and motorbikes carrying vegetable vendors began to pass along Gatot Subroto Street in front of the DPR which had previously been closed by demonstrators. By 14:00 WIB, protesters continued to storm the front of Jakarta's mobile brigade headquarters.

Due to the burning of seven bus stations and the vandalism of many others by rioters, including Polda Metro Jaya, Senen Toyota Rangga, Senen Sentral, Senayan Bank Jakarta, and Gerbang Pemuda, Transjakarta suspended operations on all routes on the morning of 30 August. As of 11:30 WIB, some Mikrotrans routes and Corridor 11 (Pulo Gebang–Kampung Melayu) had gradually resumed service. The Istora MRT station was also vandalized, with vending machines and CCTV cameras looted. The Jakarta Regional Government announced that Transjakarta and MRT services will be made free of charge for a week as recovery efforts remain underway.

Protesters began to gather in front of the private residence of member of parliament Ahmad Sahroni in Tanjung Priok at 15:00 WIB despite heavy guard presence in front of the alley. Initially the protesters came to express their dissatisfaction with Sahroni's previous statement. Looting occurred when some protesters destroyed the front gate of Sahroni's house and took luxury goods from inside his residence including a life sized Iron Man statue that was highlighted in most footages. Other looted items reported in social media included pornographic film CDs, Sahroni's school diploma, and an assault rifle along with a photocopy of his firearm license. The Tesla Model X, Porsche 356, First Generation Ford Mustang, and Lexus RZ that belonged to Sahroni were vandalized. Videos from the scene also showed Singapore dollar bills distributed among the crowd. The masses was also heard shouting "Duit rakyat!" ("[this is] the public's money!") when they ejected the luxury goods from his home.

After Sahroni's house was looted, mobs continued to gather at the private residence of Eko Patrio in Setiabudi, South Jakarta, around 22:05 WIB despite heavy security presence. Initially the mobs stayed in front of the residence's gate due to heavy guards and army presence but as the mob volume begin to increase the guards and soldiers let them enter. Since 21:55 WIB, there were reports of the home being looted with a refrigerator, water dispenser, TV, footwear, and carpet being ejected. Aside from Sahroni's house, the NasDem tower and the party's headquarters also become the target of protests demanding the dismissal of Sahroni. By 21:00 WIB, the NasDem Tower was guarded by soldiers following reports of looting at Sahroni's house.

On 30 August 2025, a mob stormed the residence of Uya Kuya's in Duren Sawit, East Jakarta, after breaching the fence and shouting "Destroy it!" The crowd looted household items, including clothing and furniture, and took Uya Kuya's pet cats. Uya Kuya stated he accepted the incident, though he expressed sadness over the loss of his pets. Parliamentarian Melly Goeslaw (Gerindra) called on protesters to return the cats to their owner.

CCTV footage capturing police brutality done by Brimob on local Warteg in Senen

At around 22:00 WIB, electricity in the neighborhoods around the Mobile Brigade headquarters was cut off. This was followed by a violent dispersal of protesters amid reports of tear gas canisters and rubber bullets being used. Videos spreading on social media showed protesters being clubbed and beaten before being taken away by law enforcement. In the following hours, elements of law enforcement and the military conducted sweeping operations to weed out the remaining protesters in the Kwitang area.

At night, Prabowo held a dialogue with representatives of 16 Islamic mass organizations, including Muhammadiyah, Nahdlatul Ulama (NU), Majelis Ulama Indonesia (MUI), Dewan Da'wah Islamiyah Indonesia (DDII), al-Irsyad, and Persatuan Islam, at his residence in Hambalang.

A TVOne reporter, identified as Leo Chandra, was reportedly detained and assaulted by police while broadcasting live near a firehouse in Koja, North Jakarta. Video footage circulating on social media appears to show him being forcibly apprehended and struck during the livestream.

==== Outside Jakarta ====
In Surabaya, rioting continued into the early hours of 30 August. Hotel Sahid Surabaya, located near Pemuda Street, suffered noticeable damage and looting after protestors were pushed back from Grahadi. Guests reported that around 1:30 WIB, crowds began pelting the hotel's glass lobby with stones, paving bricks, trash bins, and even dismantled traffic signs. Assets from a nearby police station, such as computers and police vests, were looted also, with the station being subsequently burned. One guest recounted that the group appeared to be mostly youths, with some carrying klewangs, and that crowds chanted "cair, cair" (the Indonesian word for liquidation) as they marched down Monkasel.

Protests resumed in Ahmad Yani Street, where protestors convoyed down the road before converging in front of the East Java Regional Police building. The action also saw coverage amongst social media, where participants livestream to their accounts on location. Multiple events were reported to have been cancelled due to the unrest happening throughout the previous day. The demonstration was spearheaded by the Student Executive Board of Universitas Negeri Surabaya (Unesa), whose members mobilized from Unesa's Ketintang campus and gathered at Universitas Islam Negeri Sunan Ampel prior to marching on the Polda Jatim building.

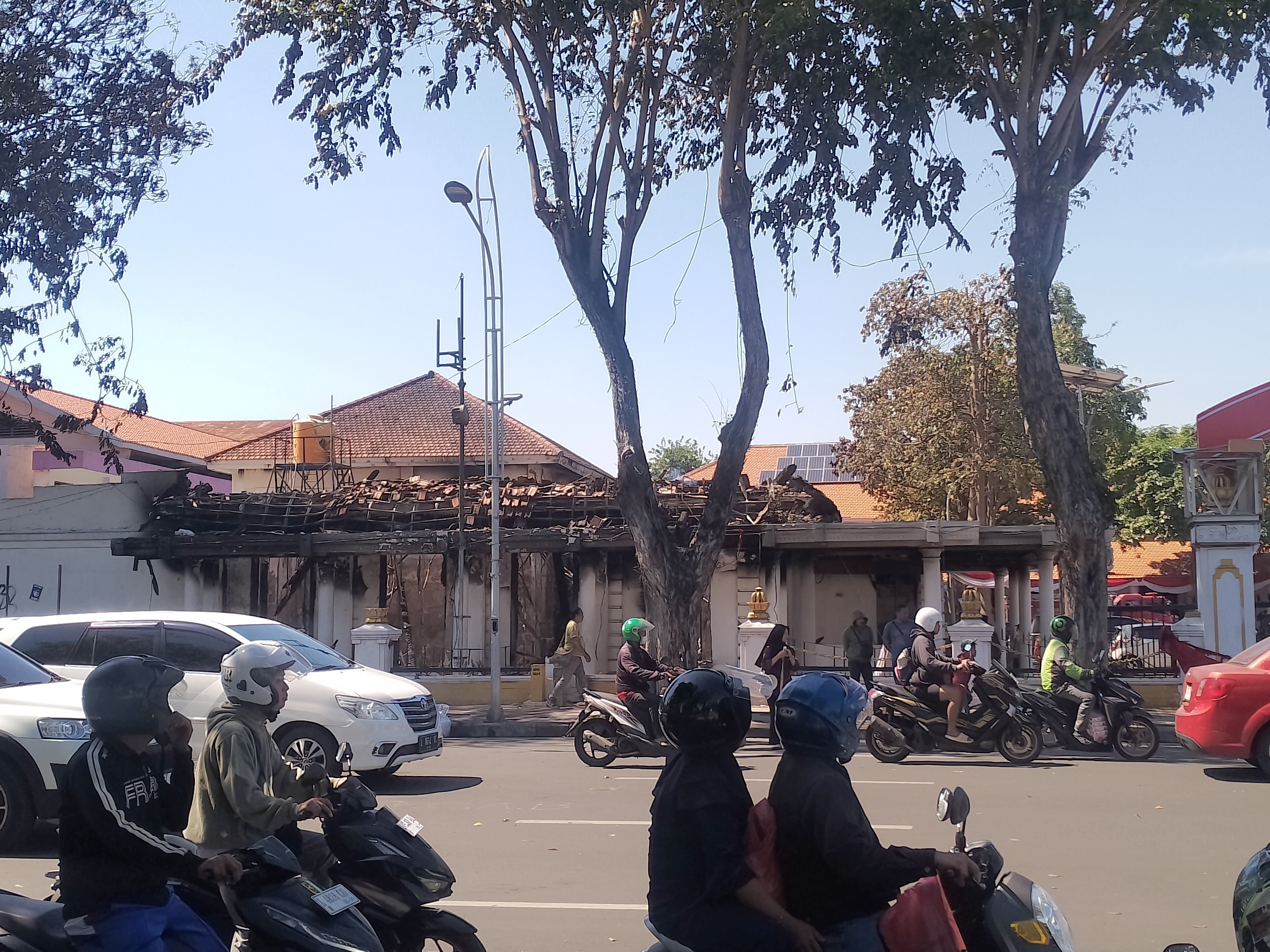
Historic Grahadi State Building in Surabaya, a day after being set ablaze by riot

At noon, East Java governor Khofifah Indar Parawansa distributed basic groceries to passersby, before protests moved back to Grahadi at night. The commander of the Kodam V/Brawijaya branch stepped in to talk with the protesters. Grahadi State Building in Surabaya was set ablaze at 22:00 WIB. The fire began after demonstrators hurled Molotov cocktails and various projectiles at the press room located on the building's west (or left) side, triggering a blaze that rapidly consumed that section and even extended to the roof. Thick plumes of black smoke filled the skyline as parts of the structure were engulfed, including the press room adjacent to Trimurti High School. Simultaneously, pillars and gate pillars were torn down and burned, while chaos intensified as protesters looted interior items such as artworks and other valuables. Surrounding trees also caught fire in the tumult. At 11:06 WIB, the crowds dispersed after several police trucks and cars arrived from the direction of Tunjungan Street, ending the gathering in front of the Grahadi State Building where people had remained until late at night during the blaze. Along the burnt buildings include the official residence of the vice governor, Emil Dardak, in which the residence was also looted by protesters.

Demonstrations in Malang, East Java was coordinated by the coordinator of ASURO or Aliansi Suara Rakjat (The Voice of People Alliance) mainly from Brawijaya University and State University of Malang. Some of the notable coordinator was Naufal Aulia Helmi Taqiyyudin (Rembo), Wildun Mukholladun, Satria Naufal, Muhammad Raynan Rizky Akbar and several other students leaders. The demonstration eventually escalated into violence, leading to the destruction of 16 police posts. Authorities detained 61 individuals, including 21 minors, with plans to release those not directly involved in the destruction.

In Mataram, the capital of West Nusa Tenggara, protesters torched the provincial parliament complex and looted valuables inside the building. Municipal legislatures were also damaged in Pekalongan, Madiun, and Cirebon, and a regency office was damaged in Banyumas.

Members of parliament from the 11th commission were spotted in Sydney and were confronted by an Indonesian student amidst the demonstrations at home. The student clarified to media that members deliberately avoided students, adding that they had cancelled their trip to the Blue Mountains while the chair of the 11th commission Mukhamad Misbakhun (Golkar) will reportedly participate in the Sydney Marathon. The Indonesian Students Union in Australia (PPIA) condemned the "working" visit by lawmakers. Misbakhun later clarified that he would not be participating in the marathon and returned home on 30 August.

In Palangka Raya, multiple students and youth organizations besieged Central Kalimantan Regional Police HQ and sent an ultimatum to the province's police chief to go out or else they will storm the building. This was ignored, resulting in a riot where several students were injured and hospitalized. The students mentioned that many of the injured were beaten and stepped on by police.

In Kupang, students gathered in front of the East Nusa Tenggara parliament building carrying slogans such as "Bubarkan DPR" (dissolve DPR) and "Polisi Pembunuh" (police are killers). The province's police chief met with the protester's representative and urged them to not block the main street. The protest was held peacefully.

In Majene, the student protest turned into a riot at night, with protesters attempted to set the regency's parliament building on fire with firecrackers and molotov cocktails. The protesters were pushed back after they ran out of molotov cocktails, while the police responded with tear gas. The fire was quickly extinguished, preventing the building from burning down.

In Kediri Regency, East Java, the protest turned into a riot at night resulting in the burning of government buildings and offices. A police station was occupied by the masses. The riot was also followed by mass looting, including at the Bhagawanta Bhari Museum owned by the local government, resulted in theft of many valuable historical artefacts. The regent of Kediri, Hanindhito Himawan, called on the protesters to return the artefacts, stating that looting of the museum was inappropriate.

==== Death of Rheza Sendy Pratama ====
Death of Rheza Sendy Pratama
- Part of the 2025 Indonesian protests
- Location: 7°45′29.2″S 110°24′01.8″E; Jalan Ring Road Utara, Condongcatur, Depok, Sleman, Yogyakarta, Indonesia
- Date: 30–31 August 2025
- Attack type: Unknown
- Victim: Rheza Sendy Pratama
- Perpetrator: Under investigation

On 30 August, 21-year-old Rheza Sendy Pramata, a student of University of Amikom Yogyakarta was killed in front of Yogyakarta Special Region Police Headquarters in Sleman. According to his father, Rheza had bid him farewell on Saturday evening — saying that he was leaving to get a coffee with his vocational school friend near Tugu Yogyakarta. According to the All Yogyakarta Student Executive Board, Rheza joined the protest as part of the student movement. During the protest, the motorcycle Rheza rode on suddenly stalled while tear gas canisters were being fired by police officers when the demonstration turned violent. After being allegedly beaten by police officers, Rheza was taken to Dr. Sardjito General Hospital on 18:30 WIB and pronounced dead at 19:06 WIB.

Rheza was later buried the same day after he was pronounced dead in Sleman. All Yogyakarta Student Executive Board held a long march starting from Gadjah Mada University to Rheza's final resting place. Rheza's family stated that they refused an autopsy and after Yogyakarta Special Region Police Chief Inspector General Anggoro Sukartono visited the family and stated that the family will not lodge any police report. Sultan Hamengkubuwono X called on the regional police to investigate Rheza's death. Anggoro also said he was still investigating the incident and unable to verify that a viral video showed Rheza's beating.

=== 31 August ===
At around 1:40 WIB a group of protesters forcibly entered Finance Minister Sri Mulyani's residence in the Mandar area of Bintaro, South Tangerang. The crowd looted valuables from inside the house, including electronics, jewelry, kitchenware, and even a basketball ring, as captured in videos circulating online. Eyewitness accounts reported that the looting was suspiciously well coordinated despite being made up of mostly teenagers and looting started after a firework explosion.

Protesters also gathered in front of the private residence of the Speaker of the People's Representative Council, Puan Maharani, in Menteng. Protesters demanded Puan to come out from her residence and meet the protesters although her whereabouts at the time was unknown. According to several of local media, the protesters' attempt to break into Puan's residence was thwarted by police.

At 4:45 WIB, Nafa Urbach's former husband's residence in Bintaro was also looted by protesters. The security guards guarding the residence were outnumbered by the looters. The looting lasted for 15 minutes, with a refrigerator, designer clothes, and TV set being stolen. Protesters mistakenly believed that the residence belonged to Nafa Urbach but instead it was a house rented by her former husband Zack Lee.

By morning, the situation outside the DPR complex in Jakarta had notably calmed. Riot police maintained a high level of security presence at the entrance to the DPR building along Gatot Subroto Street, but mass demonstrations appeared to have largely subsided by that time. Cleaning crews and city workers were actively clearing debris from streets affected by the previous unrest, including Senayan, Semanggi, and Kwitang, using over a thousand sanitation personnel, road sweepers, garbage trucks, and utility vehicles to swiftly restore order. Meanwhile, residents resumed their Sunday routines: Car Free Day proceeded as scheduled along Jalan M.H. Thamrin and Jenderal Sudirman.

At 12:10 WIB, President Prabowo Subianto summoned every chairperson of the government coalition parties to the State Palace, including the speaker of the People's Consultative Assembly Ahmad Muzani. The president also summoned the chairpersons of supporting parties including Megawati Sukarnoputri and Speaker of the House of Representatives Puan Maharani. Following this meeting, Prabowo announned that parliamentary fraction leaders have agreed to reverse the housing allowance as well as put a moratorium on foreign work trips. He also claimed, without any concrete evidence, that "there are signs of lawlessness, even elements of treason and terrorism." He also stated that the government will respect freedom of speech as stated in Article 19 of the International Covenant on Civil and Political Rights and the Freedom of Public Expressions Act (Law No. 9 of 1998). Prabowo's announcement was soon followed by a press statement by defense minister Sjafrie Sjamsoeddin, who ordered police and armed forces member to take firm action against looters of officials' homes. At the same time, vice president Gibran Rakabuming Raka met with representatives of motorcycle taxi drivers. The chairman of the union of motorcycle taxi drivers later denied the representatives being part of them, stating that the drivers are of unclear origin.

At around 16:30 WIB, fires and looting were reported at the police explosive ordinance disposal squad (Gegana) headquarters at Jalan Kramat in Central Jakarta. Five people were arrested and nine fire trucks were deployed to extinguish the fire.

The Jakarta Regional Police confirmed a large scale citywide nighttime patrol to prevent further acts of anarchy, on direct orders from the President. This operation will be supported by elements of the military as well as the regional government.

==== Outside Jakarta ====
In Mamuju, West Sulawesi, the protest held by students in front of Mamuju Regency and West Sulawesi parliament buildings turned into a riot. The students were seen carrying Indonesian flags tied together with the Straw Hat Pirates' Jolly Roger flag, a recent prominent symbol of Indonesian opposition. The students tried to push back inside the building, which the police responded with tear gas.

In Blitar, from 30–31 August, several individuals reportedly tried to attack the Blitar City Police Headquarters. Two clashes broke out between the crowd and police at the Sudirman Street intersection, about 150 meters from the headquarters, on 30 August at 9:30 PM WIB and 31 August at 2:00 AM WIB. A number of people also attempted to arson, vandalize, and loot the Blitar Regency DPRD office. The crowd reportedly arrived in four waves, with the largest number in the final wave. As a result of the riot, the Blitar Regency DPRD office nearly burned down and lost several items. Kompas reported as much as 143 suspects were arrested in the attempted attack on the Blitar City Police Department, some of them were involved in the riots in Kediri City and Regency, and most were under the influence of alcohol and drugs. Among them were five Central Java residents who had only arrived in Blitar a few days earlier.

In Berlin, a protest was organized by Indonesians in Berlin at the Brandenburg Gate.

=== 1 September ===
In light of the planned protest held by motorcycle taxi drivers in front of the parliament building, the Jakarta police deployed 5,369 police members to guard the building. Minor protests involving student organizations and elements of civil society occurred in front of the parliament building's main entrance, with the back entrance of the parliament building mostly empty. The protests were mostly peaceful, with student protesters focusing their protests on the parliament members instead of the police. The All-Indonesian Union of Student Council (BEM SI), which had planned to join the protests, cancelled their involvement, citing security concerns. By 18:00 WIB, most of the protesters had withdrawn from the area.

House of Representatives members returned to work with the first commission holding a working meeting with the Indonesian National Armed Forces regarding their portion of the state budget. The House also plans to hold a meeting of the DPR RI Legislative Body with the agenda of drafting a Draft Law on the Protection of Domestic Workers (RUU PPRT). Chief of Staff of the Indonesian Army Maruli Simanjuntak said that the situation has now calmed as security measures conducted on the previous day had been well executed.

Member of parliament Said Abdullah announced that plans to cancel the allowance hike had been brought up to the Household Affairs Committee to be discussed. Abdullah said that house allowances will absolutely be repealed but did not disclose what other benefits will be retracted aside from that.

Protests continued throughout 1 September in Jakarta, Bogor, Yogyakarta, Ngawi, Samarinda, Tarakan, Ternate, Baubau, Gunungsitoli, Ambon, Palopo and Surakarta

==== Outside Jakarta ====
Police entering UNISBA Campus Tamansari, Bandung. Students reportedly tried to barricade themselves within campus buildings.

TNI APC blocking an entry point to UNISBA Campus Tamansari, Bandung.

On 1 September, Andika Lutfi Hasan, a 16-year-old student, died in hospital after being in a coma for three days after suffering serious injuries while participating in a demonstration in Tangerang on 28 August. The chief of Tangerang regional police confirmed his death.

Hundreds of students affiliated with the Muhammadiyah Student Association (IMM) and the Student Executive Board of Muhammadiyah University of Sidoarjo organized a peaceful demonstration outside the Sidoarjo City Police Headquarters. Authorities prepared approximately 700 security personnel, including police, military, and municipal officers in advance of the protest, which unfolded peacefully, concluding with collective prayers, a communal meal, and a social service drive for local communities. The demonstration was positively received by Sidoarjo Regent Subandi.

In Bogor, a group of civil society and students from Cipayung Plus Bogor held a demonstration titled "Reflection on Democracy" on Sudirman Road, Central Bogor. The crowd gave speeches in front of the Bogor Palace, bringing a number of demands. During the demonstration, they highlighted the economic and political crises, as well as the practice of power that they considered increasingly distant from the people. They also criticized the arrogant attitude and repressive actions of the authorities that led to the death of an online motorcycle taxi driver in Jakarta. Seven hundred security personnel were deployed to oversee the demonstration, which proceeded peacefully until its conclusion in the evening.

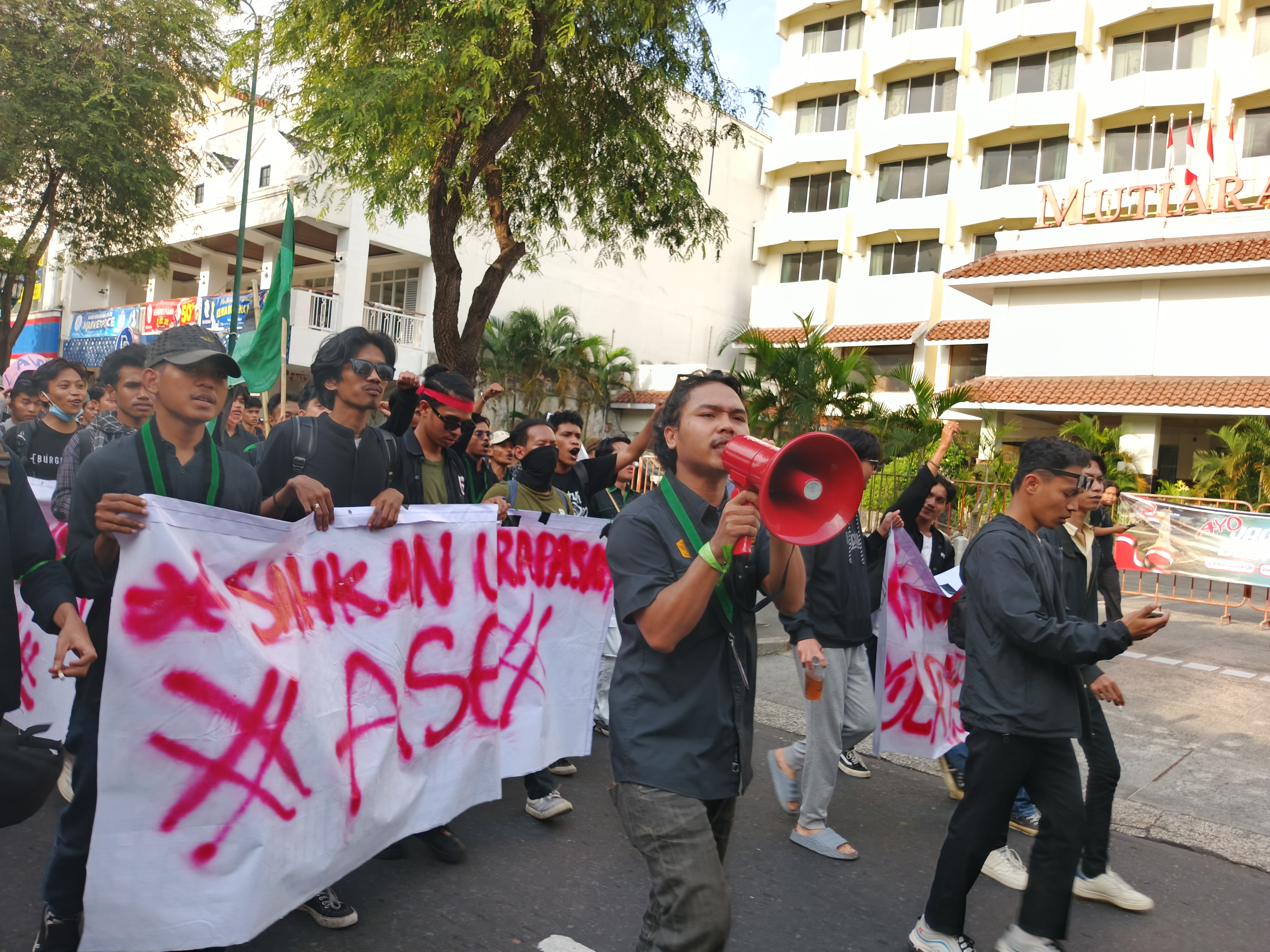
Demonstration on Malioboro Street, Yogyakarta

In Yogyakarta, a sit-in protest was held at the Gadjah Mada University roundabout, with protesters demanding justice for the deaths of Affan Kurniawan and Rheza Sendy Pratama. Protesters gathered for about two hours before withdrawing peacefully at around 14:00 WIB. A similar sit-in protest was held in Bekasi, with protesters meeting the mayor and city council chairman to voice their demands.

In Ngawi, dozens of students and civil society representatives gathered in front of the Ngawi Regional Parliament building to convey five demands submitted by a number of student representatives which were then accepted by the chairman of the Regional Parliament and discussed together.

In Samarinda, East Kalimantan, 22 students from Mulawarman University were arrested for allegedly preparing molotov cocktails to be transported to protest sites which had been going on since 30 August. Eighteen of them were immediately released after they were found to be not involved. The protest in East Kalimantan intensified on 1 September as thousands of students in both Samarinda and Kutai Kartanegara Regency held a long march towards government buildings under an umbrella group called the Mahakam Alliance. The speaker of East Kalimantan's parliament met with the students in Samarinda to negotiate and calm down the situation, but the protest later deteriorated after the parliament members left for the inside of the building. Among the demands of the students were the passing of several long-stalled bills such as the Confiscation of Assets Act, Domestic Worker Protections Act, and Indigenous People Act, as well as demanding better pay for teachers and lecturers.

In Tarakan, North Kalimantan, thousands of university students affiliated with an umbrella organization "Aliansi Utara" (Northern Alliance) gathered in front of the Tarakan city parliament building. The students demanded the parliament members to do a live video call to representatives of the region in the national parliament (DPR) which the speaker of the city's parliament agreed to. The negotiation through the video call was interrupted when the protest turned into a riot. Both the city's parliament and the municipal police later agreed to sign a letter stating that they agreed with the student's demands.

In Banda Aceh, Aceh, a demonstration in the courtyard of the DPRA building on 1 September 2025 centered on demands for comprehensive reform of the national DPR and the Aceh DPRA, reform of the National Police, resolution of human rights violations in Aceh, rejection of a plan to establish a new battalion in the province, a full review of mining permits, the release of detained protesters, and transparency and auditing of Special Autonomy funds; the assembly's leadership accepted and signed the seven-point petition in front of the crowd. An action reported as orderly since midday grew tense after maghrib (sunset prayer time) when part of the crowd stayed around the legislative complex. During a dialogue, DPRA Chair Zulfadli sparked national controversy by challenging protesters to add one more point—“Aceh to separate from the Jakarta (central government)”—which was not incorporated into the signed text but ignited broad public debate. During the procession and speeches, many participants carried and raised the Bintang Bulan (Crescent-Star) flag and “Referendum” banners, as recorded in media reports and same-day field documentation.

In Ternate, North Maluku, the protest held by students turned into a riot as the protesters tried to push back the police and tried to enter the city's parliament building. The police responded with tear gas and the resulting riot led to 16 people being arrested, including two minors. Three police were injured in the aftermath. Meanwhile, in neighbouring Tidore, protests demanding the resignation of the police chief amid police brutality cases were held peacefully in front of the city's municipal police building.

In Baubau, Southeast Sulawesi, the protest which mainly consisted of students demanded two Tritura (triple demands), a national Tritura and a local Tritura. The national demands are to reform police institution, to pass regulations that will demand higher qualifications to be parliament members, as well as passing of the Asset Confiscation Act. Meanwhile, the local demands are to urge local parliament and government institutions to back the national demands, to solve case of alleged tax mafia and increase local government revenue, and to urge the city government to implement free education and lower price of basic food goods. The protest was held peacefully.

In Gunungsitoli, a similar protest was also held by student organizations such as Muslim Student Union and Indonesian Christian Student Movement, with similar demands such as demanding police reform and cancellation of the parliament members' allowance. While the protest was held peacefully, it was reported that the situation was more tense than usual demonstrations in the city with several soldiers and police officers guarding local parliament members. The protesters eventually dispersed later.

In Ambon, Maluku, a protest was held in front of Maluku province's parliament by two groups of student alliances, "Aliansi Masyarakat Maluku" (Maluku Society Alliance) which consist of All-Ambon Student Executive Bodies, Ambon Muslim Student Association, and Indonesian Muslim Student Movement, and Cipayung Alliance which consist of National Committee of Indonesian Youth, Indonesian National Student Movement, Muhammadiyah Student Association, Indonesian Christian Student Movement, and the Indonesian Muslim Student Action Union. Both student alliances' orator spoke roughly at the same time to the parliament members who were present. However, Maluku Society Alliance interrupted Cipayung Alliance's oration session and asked them to stop overriding theirs despite both groups staging protests with similar demands. Tensions rose between the two alliances resulted in fistfights while the parliament members who were caught in the middle escaped. In addition, some students from Maluku Society Alliance accused the others of being bribed by the government to not protest while claiming themselves to be purer in motivation. Security forces in the vicinity immediately tried to separate both groups while the police requested the groups to present their oration consecutively instead. At the end, the parliament signed the protesters' demands including the release of two environmental activists who were arrested after protesting against the mining industry in the region.

In Palopo, South Sulawesi, the student protesters demanded to meet the city's parliament members. The protest turned into a riot after no lawmaker was willing to meet the protesters. The protesters pushed themselves inside and damaged the parliament building, while the police responded with tear gas. The protesters broke into the plenary session hall and destroyed tables and chairs inside as well as throwing stones towards the police. Several police and one journalist was injured.

In Surakarta, students – notably from Sebelas Maret University, Muhammadiyah University of Surakarta, and UIN Raden Mas Said Surakarta – held a peaceful demonstration in front of the DPRD Solo building under the banner "Solo Raya Menggugat" ("Greater Solo Sues"). The protest began at approximately 13:00 WIB, with participants voicing demands that included the release of detained demonstrators, accountability for state violence, police reform, and the cancellation of problematic legislative bills. The action unfolded calmly throughout the afternoon, with demonstrators gathering at the DPRD site before dispersing without incident by evening.

==== 17+8 demands ====
On 1 September, a number of social media personalities published the 17+8 demands, which listed 25 demands that were directed at various government institutions. The demands were a summary of 211 different demands from civil organizations as well as statements from other academic and labor unions, and was formulated by internet personalities Salsa Erwina Hutagalung, Fathia Izzati, Abigail Limuria, Andovi da Lopez, Andhyta Firselly Utami, and Jerome Polin. The 25 demands were divided into 17 short-term demands subject to be fulfilled by 5 September 2025 and eight long-term demands subject to be fulfilled on 31 August 2026:

Demands

===== Short-term demands =====
- To the President:
  - Remove the Armed Forces out of the civil law enforcement and ensure no criminalization of protesters
  - Create an independent investigation commission on the cases of Affan Kurniawan, Umar Amarudin, and other victims of police brutality during the 28–30 August protest with a clear mandate and ensure its transparency
- To the People's Representative Council
  - Freeze the pay raise and perks to the representatives and cancelation of new facilities (including pensions)
  - Transparency of publication of funds
  - Demand the Honorary Body of the People's Representatives Council to probe into scandalous representatives
- To the Chairperson of Political Parties
  - Sacking and sanction to unethical members in the People's Representatives Council that were responsible for the unrest
  - Announce the commitment of political parties to side with the people during crisis
  - Involve members for public dialogue with students and civil organizations
- To the Police Forces
  - Free all detained protesters
  - End to police brutality and adherence to standard operating procedure on demonstration
  - Arrest and bring all officers and commanders who were involved in suspected human rights violations to justice
- To the Armed Forces
  - Return to barracks and cease all involvements in civilian law enforcement
  - Uphold internal discipline to prevent armed forces meddling with police affairs
  - Public commitment of armed forces not to enter civilian space during crises
- To the Ministers in the economic sector
  - Ensure reasonable wages to every workforces nationwide
  - Take emergency measures to prevent mass layoffs and protect every contract laborers
  - Open dialogue with labor unions

===== Long-term demands =====
- Total cleansing and reform to the People's Representatives Council
  - Conduct independent audits and have the results publicized to the people. Increase the standards of preconditions to qualify as a member of parliament (i.e. no prior corruption cases) and standardize a KPI for evaluating every member. Remove any special privileges, including but not limited to, pensions, transportation and escorts, and taxes covered by the State Budget.
- Political parties reform and strengthen the executive watch
  - Political parties must publish their first financial statements within this year, and DPR must ensure that the opposition must function as it was supposed to.
- Draft fairer tax reform plans
  - Reconsider the balance of transferring the State Budget from the central government to local governments. Repeal plans to increase taxes that may burden the people and draft a plan for a fairer tax reform.
- Pass and uphold the Asset Seizure Draft Bill
  - House of Representatives must pass the Asset Seizure Draft Bill within this year to demonstrate serious commitments to fight corruption in conjunction with strengthening the Corruption Eradication Commission and the Corruption Eradication Act
- Leadership and systemic reform to the police forces to achieve more professional and humanist policing
  - DPR must reform the Police Act. The police must decentralize their functions: public enforcement, security, traffic control within 12 months for starters.
- Return the armed forces to the barracks without exception
  - The government must revoke the mandate bestowed to the Indonesian National Armed Forces in civilian projects such as in large scale farming (food estate) within this year, and DPR must start to revise the Armed Forces Act
- Strengthen the National Commission on Human Rights and independent watchdogs
  - DPR must revise the National Commission of Human Rights Act to broaden their responsibilities on freedom of speech. President must empower Ombudsman and Kompolnas
- Review policies from the economic and labor sectors
  - Seriously review national strategic projects (PSN) and economic priorities by protecting the rights of indigenous people and the environment. Reevaluate the Omnibus Law on Job Creation that burdens the people especially workers, and audit the governance of Danantara and state owned enterprises.

=== 2 September ===
In response to ongoing protests and potential security threats, Ansor Youth Movement, the youth wing of Nahdlatul Ulama; under the lead of its leader, Addin Jauharudin, has deployed its Banser militia units to collaborate with the military and National Police in maintaining public order and safety across various regions. This initiative aims to support national stability amid recent demonstrations that have escalated into unrest.

==== Jakarta ====
The spokesperson of the BEM SI, and coordinator of the Student Movement, Muzammil Ihsan, declared that the demonstration for 2 September is canceled, due to fears that the "2025 Indonesia (C)emas Jilid II" rally would be exploited by agent provocateurs from the outside. Furthermore, local media outlet Wartakota reported that BEM SI stated the upcoming protest will convey 11 demands to the government.

However, several other groups of protesters continued to protest at seven different locations, such as the Indonesian Student Online Motorcycle Taxi Community (KOMI), People's Alliance Concerned about Energy (ARPE), Berkarya Party Regional Leadership Forum, Indonesian Muslim Youth Central Jakarta Branch, Group of Lecturers from the University of Muhammadiyah, and The People's Alliance of State-Owned Enterprises. Those groups each made different demands.

Indonesian diaspora in Australia conducted a protest in Melbourne, Australia wearing pink shirt as a symbol of resistance.

=== 3 September ===
==== Jakarta ====
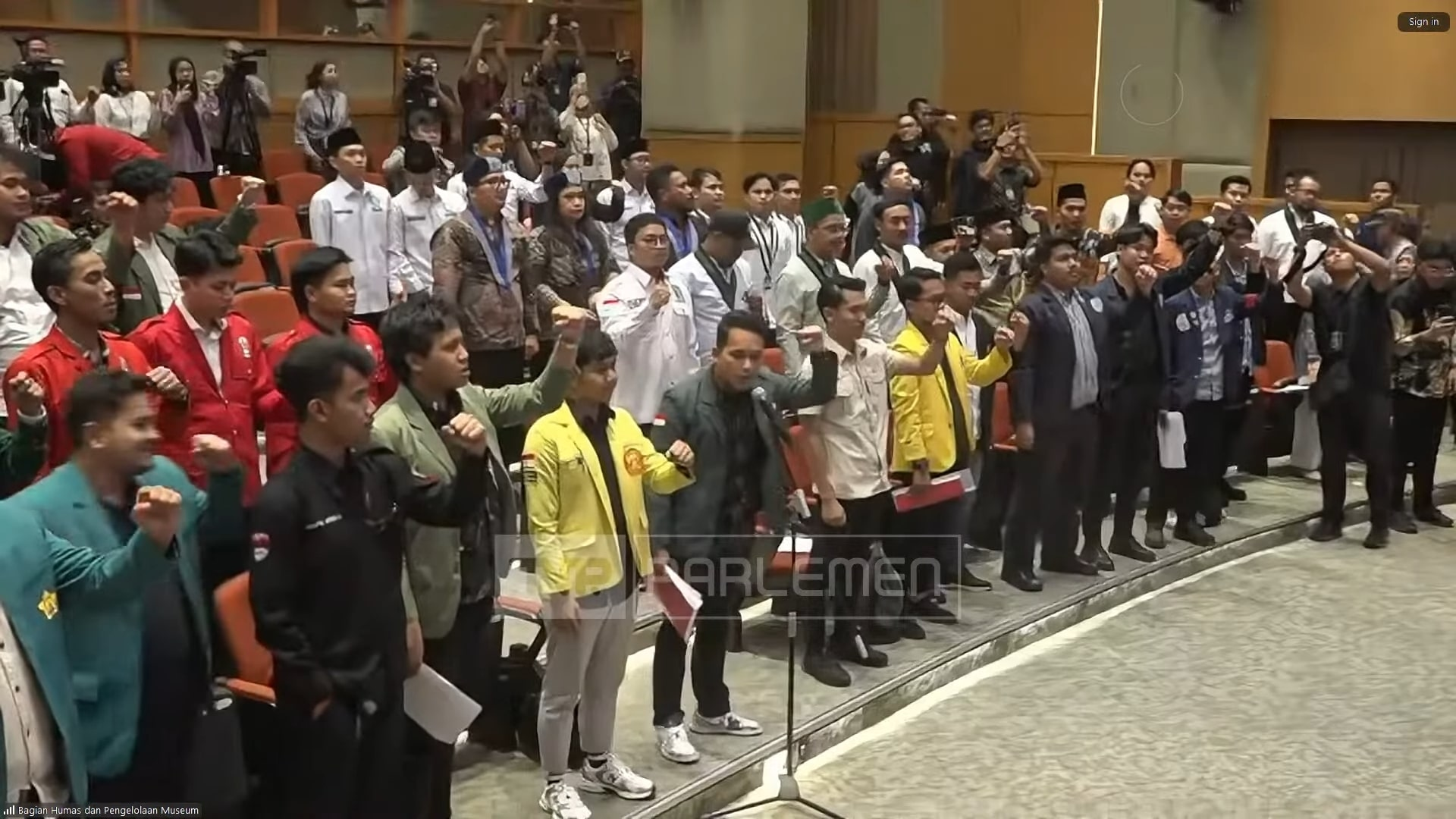
Presentation of demands by Indonesian Student Executive Board representatives to House of Representatives leaders, 3 September 2025

Representatives from student executive bodies across Indonesia led by Muzammil Ihsan, Central Coordinator of the All-Indonesian Students' Union and his fellow representatives such as Abdul Hakim; representative from the Muslim Students' Association (HMI), and Agus Setiawan; chairman of the University of Indonesia rector appointed Student Executive Board (BEM UI-Ungu), were invited to the People's Consultative Assembly (MPR) building to meet with Deputy Speakers Sufmi Dasco Ahmad, Cucun Ahmad Syamsurijal and Saan Mustopa, along with other lawmakers. During this meeting, Agus discussed the students' demands regarding the Asset Confiscation Bill, allowances for lawmakers, and also questioned Prabowo's claims of alleged act of treason against the state' by protestors during the demonstrations over the past week. Apart from Agus' demands, Muzammil also added demands for the realization of the provision of 19 million jobs promised by Vice President Gibran. However, the hearing session got heated when its Abdul Hakim turn to speak, as he firmly asked Dasco to immediately call the National Police Chief Listyo Sigit to release the demonstrators who are still being detained. After meeting with the students, Dasco told reporters that he recognized the student representatives' demands as part of the 17+8 petition. He also added that he would consider their demands at the next DPR meeting.

Meanwhile, some Universitas Indonesia Student Executive Board (BEM UI) members criticized Agus' uncoordinated attendance, which he clarified was his own initiative, within his democratic rights. BEM UI-Kuning, comprising branches from 14 faculties and an opposing faction, rejected Agus’ claim to represent UI students, stating he lacked their authorization. BEM UI-Kuning declined the DPR's invitation on 3 September 2025 primarily because they viewed the forum as lacking substantive value and potentially serving as a political token rather than a genuine avenue for reform. BEM UI-Kuning's leadership argued that attending the legislature's session would let lawmakers claim they "listened to students" without committing to real change. They criticized the invitation, issued hours before the session without formal documentation, as procedurally flawed. They also feared joining alongside BEM UI-Ungu would legitimize the dual UI leadership, weakening the student movement.

Meanwhile, The Police Ethics Commission found Police Commissioner Cosmas Kaju Gae, a Brimob battalion commander in the tactical vehicle that ran over Affan Kurniawan, guilty and dishonorably discharged him from the police force. Despite the support given in social media of his dismissal, a community group made up of mostly East Nusa Tenggara residents opposed Cosmas' dismissal as unfair and too harsh. A petition in Change.org was made by Mercy Jasinta in the name of the Ngada-Flores-NTT community and justice supporters to reconsider Cosmas' dismissal.

==== Outside Jakarta ====
In Cilegon, Banten, joint patrols involving the National Police, Banser, and the military were conducted to anticipate potential riots following recent protests. These coordinated efforts, involving local security forces and community volunteers, aimed to maintain peace and prevent disturbances in the region.

=== 4 September ===
==== Jakarta ====
At seven in the morning, more than 30 representatives of Indonesian university student organizations from Himapolindo, BEM SI Kerakyatan, Sunan Gunung Djati State Islamic University Bandung, Syarif Hidayatullah State Islamic University Jakarta, National Development University "Veteran" of East Java, YARSI, KBM Trisakti, Trisakti University, BEM PTNU, and Indonesian Christian Student Movement arrived at the Presidential Palace. One of them, Muhammad Raihan, a representative of the Student Executive Board of Universitas Nahdlatul Ulama Seluruh Nusantara, stated that their agenda was to meet with Prabowo to discuss the continuation of the demands for the release of the students still detained, following up on the similar demand from HMI from the previous day. The students were hosted by Minister of Education and Culture Brian Yuliarto. The meeting concluded with State Secretary Prasetyo Hadi expressing his appreciation for the students' presence.

Later, students in Jakarta again held a peaceful demonstration in front of the DPR/MPR led by BEM SI. The coordinator of the protest, Muzammil Ihsan, conveyed 13 demands from the students:

Demands
1. Reduction in allowances to lawmakers
2. Immediate ratification of the Confiscation of Assets Act
3. Complete reform the National Police and the DPR
4. Release of detained student protesters
5. Condemnation of police brutality
6. Complete evaluation of government policies
7. Reform the military code of justice
8. Evaluation of the still-discussed Criminal Code
9. Justice for those who became victims of police brutality
10. Realization of the "19 million new jobs" campaign promise from the Vice President
11. Improve the welfare of educators
12. Rejection to the placement of 5 military battalions and military courts at University of Riau
13. Rejection of the officials' dual function in the government

Aside from 13 demands, Muzammil also spoke out that this act condemns anarchistic behaviors from any elements of protestors.

Meanwhile, the Labor Movement with the People (GEBRAK, Gerakan Buruh Bersama Rakyat); a temporary alliance of labor movements in Jakarta, also held a mass protest in the area of the Arjuna Wijaya Statue in Central Jakarta. They filed 5 different demands.

Demands
1. Stop shootings, torture, and the mobilization of combat vehicles in civilian areas; Unconditionally release all arrested protesters and democracy activists and stop the criminalization of the people's movement.
2. Complete reform the National Police and the DPR
3. investigate the killings and enforced disappearances. Gebrak called for the formation of an independent team to uncover the 10 victims who died and those who disappeared,
4. Revoke anti-people policies and stifling taxes. Cancel tax increases that burden the poor and middle class
5. Budget cuts for officials and the National Police to be used for the welfare of the people.

Those labor workers crowded Jalan M.H. Thamrin, causing traffic congestion in the area.

In a separate action, the initiators of the 17+8 Demands held protests in front of the MPR/DPR Building, reading the full demands and issued an ultimatum to fulfill them. The documents containing the demands were then given to members Andre Rosiade from Gerindra Party and Rieke Diah Pitaloka from PDI-P, who promised to submit the documents to the parliament leadership. Answering criticism on the deadline of the 17 demands being unrealistically fast, Andovi da Lopez told reporters that back in the 2024 Indonesian local election law protests, the DPR can defuse the situation by revising the law in a single night which demonstrates that the government can fulfill the 17 demands if they "really have the will to do so".

==== Outside Jakarta ====
In East Seram Regency, Maluku, four students suffered burn injuries after trying to light used tires on fire during a protest in front of the regency's parliament building. The students were immediately rushed to a nearby hospital in town of Bula.

=== 6–9 September ===
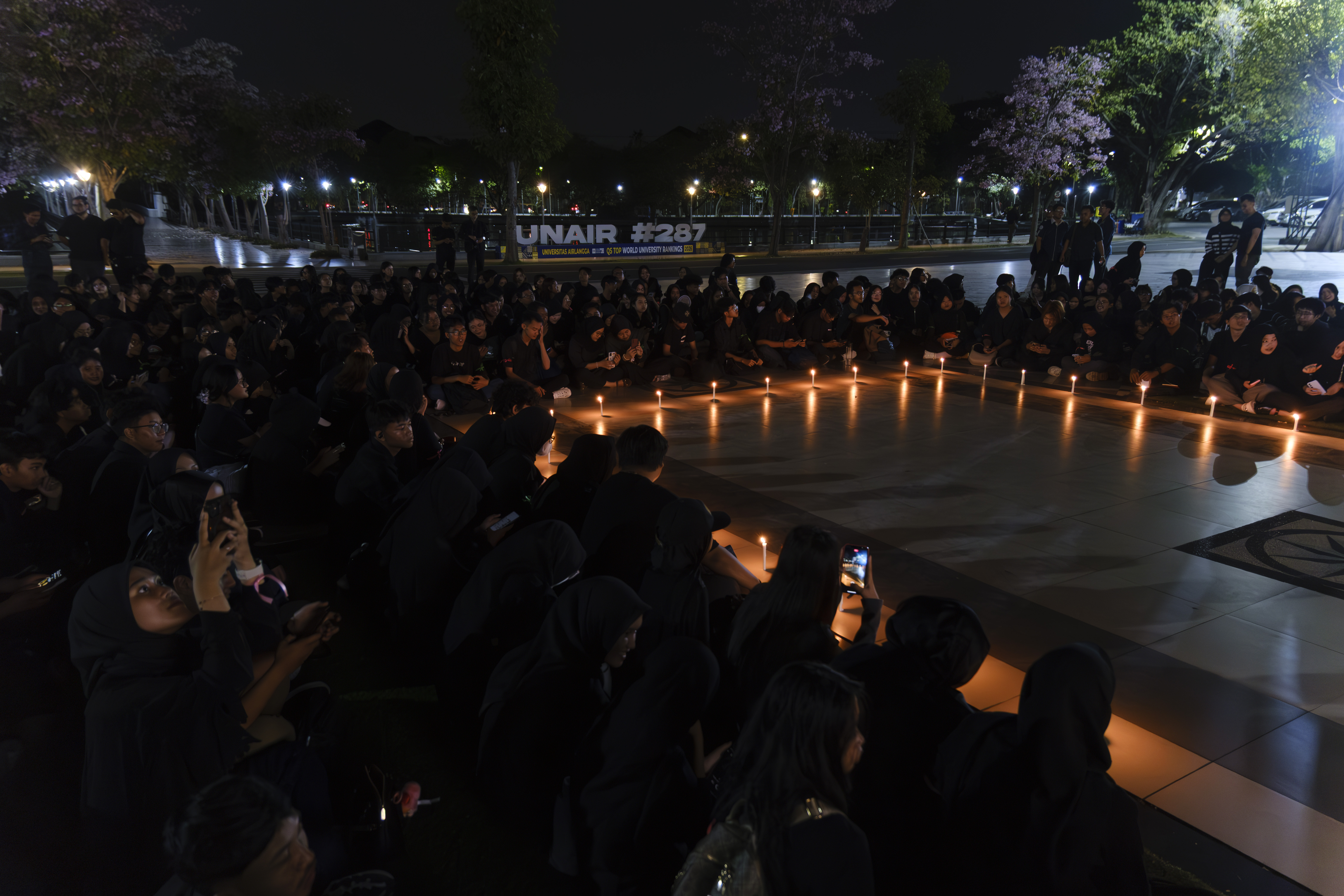
Candlelight vigil held in the rector's front courtyard in Airlangga University - C Campus

On 6 September, Airlangga University students in Surabaya held a gathering in front of the university's rectory building. The students, led by the university's student body executives and attended by lecturers as well as students affected by the protests, held a vigil for all the victims who died during earlier protests, vowed to continue the protest, and demanded that president Prabowo issue an apology for his failure to prevent the riots.

On 7 September in Jakarta, several online motorcycle driver unions planned to stage a protest in front of the DPR/MPR Building, focusing on five demands, mainly centered around the protection of online ride-hailing gig workers and a transparent investigation regarding Affan's death.

On 9 September, the University of Indonesia Student Executive Board staged another demonstration in front of the parliament complex. Their demands once again included the 17+8 Demands, using the hashtag #RakyatTagihJanji (Indonesian: People demand promise), in addition to holding the government accountable for their own promises. In response, the police deployed 2,852 personnel in the complex.

== Reactions ==
=== Central government ===
President Prabowo Subianto addressing the protest and the killing of Affan Kurniawan, 29 August 2025

A day after Affan's death, President Prabowo Subianto delivered a televised address, which was his first public remarks since the unrest began. He expressed condolences for Affan's death, pledged government support for his family, and condemned the police's "excessive" actions. He promised a transparent investigation, urged calm, and warned of "elements" causing unrest without evidence. A day after Affan's death, together with defense minister Sjafrie Sjamsoeddin and cabinet secretary Teddy Indra Wijaya, Prabowo visited Affan's parents to deliver condolences directly and gifted them a house in Cileungsi, which was handed over directly by housing minister Maruarar Sirait. Chairman of the Democratic Party and coordinating minister for infrastructure Agus Harimurti Yudhoyono urged all Democratic Party parliamentarians to control their statements in public. Minister of State Secretary Prasetyo Hadi delivered similar remarks, urging the protesters not to damage public facilities and assuring that the government had negotiated with labor unions regarding the demands. The national police chief, Listyo Sigit Prabowo, apologized to Affan's family and the motorcycle taxi driver community.

On 29 August, Vice President Gibran Rakabuming Raka visited victims of the 28 August demonstrations in Jakarta. He went to RS Pelni and RSCM hospitals to meet with the injured, including Umar Amarudin, an online motorcycle taxi driver from Sukabumi who was reportedly assaulted by security forces. During his visits, Gibran offered encouragement and emphasized the importance of rest for recovery.

Former deputy foreign minister Dino Patti Djalal urged Prabowo to cancel his planned visit to China in light of the situation, urging him to delegate his presence to foreign minister Sugiono. Prabowo initially canceled his invitation to the 2025 China Victory Day Parade — and considered skipping the 80th session of the United Nations General Assembly — but ultimately proceeded with his attendance at the Victory Day event, returning to Jakarta the same night. Foreign Minister Sugiono attended the 2025 Shanghai Cooperation Organization Tianjin Summit in Prabowo's stead. Sugiono delivered Prabowo's apology to the Office of the Central Foreign Affairs Commission director, Wang Yi, leading film director Joko Anwar to criticize how easy the apology to China is made compared to an apology to the people of Indonesia.

On the afternoon of 30 August, President Prabowo Subianto summoned armed forces commander Agus Subiyanto and national police chief Listyo Sigit Prabowo to evaluate the security situation. The president directed the armed forces and police to take firm action against "Anarchist mobs". Not long after, Listyo Sigit Prabowo authorized the use of rubber bullets and non-lethal weapons on "anarchists" entering police bases and dormitories.

On 31 August, Prabowo summoned leaders of all political parties to the State Palace, followed up by a cabinet meeting. Around the same time, Coordinating Minister for Economic Affairs Airlangga Hartarto denied reports that Finance Minister Sri Mulyani had resigned from the cabinet, mentioning that she was present at the cabinet meeting. On the same day, several cabinet members, including Coordinating Minister for Food Affairs Zulkifli Hasan, Minister for the Protection of Indonesian Migrant Workers Abdul Kadir Karding, and Minister of Maritime Affairs and Fisheries Sakti Wahyu Trenggono announced their support for Prabowo on their personal social media accounts. On 1 September, Sri Mulyani gave her first statement after her house was ransacked, apologizing for the government 's shortcomings and calling for a "healthy democracy".

On 1 September, Prabowo visited police officers being treated for injuries. In a press conference following the visit, Prabowo mentioned that 40 people were treated initially, with a majority having been discharged. Seventeen people, consisting of 14 officers and three civilians, were still being treated at the Police Hospital. According to him, injuries sustained during the protests ranged from skull fractures to severed limbs and serious kidney damage requiring dialysis. He also announced that the injured officers will receive promotions and that the police will pay for any schooling the officers wish to undertake, and that the chief of police, Listyo Sigit, had been instructed to this end.

On 2 September, Prabowo met with the leaders of Confederation of All Indonesian Workers' Unions (KSPSI) and DPR speaker Puan Maharani. They negotiated a draft plan for the Confiscation of Assets bill demanded by the protestors. The said bill will target government officials involved in corruption. Meanwhile, Vice President Gibran visited the home of Andika Lutfi Falah, who died during a demonstration in Tangerang, to pay respects to his family. After the riots had subsided, Prabowo departed for Beijing on the evening of 2 September.

Coordinating Minister for Legal, Human Rights, Immigration, and Corrections Yusril Ihza Mahendra announced that the government plans to initiate a comprehensive revision of the General Election Law, aligning legislative frameworks with a recent Constitutional Court ruling. He emphasized that the overhaul is necessary to eliminate barriers such as candidate thresholds and to open political participation beyond well-funded individuals or celebrities — the current system, he argued, limits the representativeness and quality of legislative candidates like DPR members.

Following protests that escalated into looting starting 25 August 2025, Indonesia's Minister of Home Affairs, Tito Karnavian, called for the reactivation of Neighborhood Security System (Siskamling), at the resident unit (RW) and neighborhood unit (RT) community levels to prevent further unrest.

In the Post-Demonstration Monitoring and Evaluation Assistance for the Solo Raya Region, the Inspector General of the Ministry of Home Affairs confirmed to journalists that the Solo region had returned to a conducive state.

According to the Indonesian Human Rights Minister Natalius Pigai, the status of the three people reported missing by Commission for Missing Persons and Victims of Violence (KontraS) cannot yet be verified. It was revealed on 18 September that two of them were not actually missing. Instead, Those two are just travelling outside their hometown for working.

=== Regional governments ===
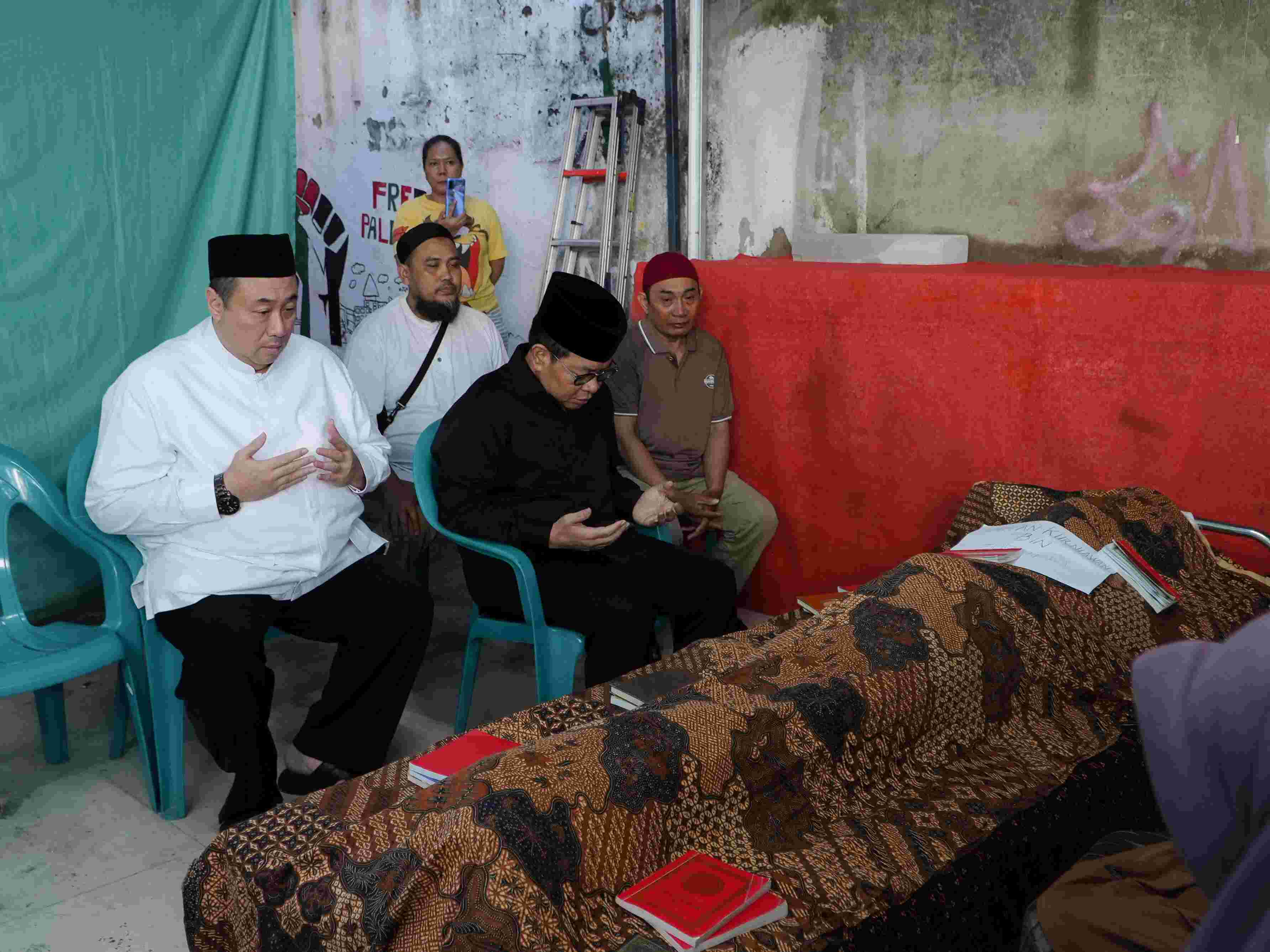
Pramono Anung (in black) attending Affan's funeral on 29 August.

The Governor of Jakarta, Pramono Anung, appealed for restraint and peaceful resolution, and urged students not to get involved in the protests. He later stated that the provincial government would not revoke the allowance support from students who participate in protests. The governor of West Java Dedi Mulyadi offered to become a foster parent to Affan's younger sibling, who is still in junior high school, and promised to help the family find a permanent home in Jakarta. As an effort to call for calm and unity, the Jakarta provincial government promoted the slogan #JagaJakarta (Protect Jakarta) as an attempt to call on citizens to rebuild the city together after being struck by riots.

The Governor of North Sumatra, Bobby Nasution said that he welcomed the demonstrations conducted in front of the North Sumatra Regional House of Representatives but also said the demonstrations should not end in anarchy. He then urged those who wished to exercise freedom of speech to conduct themselves in an orderly manner. As a form of solidarity over Affan's killing, Bobby distributed groceries to motorcycle taxi drivers.

The Sultan and Governor of Yogyakarta, Hamengkubuwono X, went to see the demonstration in person and urged both sides to stay peaceful. When he arrived in Yogyakarta Provincial Police Headquarters, the Sultan, accompanied by two of his daughters and members of the provincial government called representatives of the protesters to come inside to discuss mitigation of violence while the Sultan was seen seriously listening to the protesters' demands. The Sultan expressed his condolences on Affan Kurniawan and reminded the protesters to exercise their freedom of speech without violence. He also urged the protesters to stay calm and not be fueled by provocation and told the police to ensure transparency in due process. The Sultan also commented that public officials should refrain from flaunting their wealth and behave themselves.

On 30 August 2025, amid the intensifying protests at Grahadi State Building in Surabaya, Governor Khofifah Indar Parawansa personally engaged with demonstrators. She emerged from the building to greet and embrace attendees, invited them into the grounds, and distributed more than 1,000 assistance packages. Later that evening, she appealed to the authorities to coordinate with the Surabaya City Police Headquarters for the release of detained protest participants, calling on them to avoid provocation and emphasizing respect for those expressing democratic rights. On the following day, 31 August, Khofifah continued her outreach by meeting residents again at Grahadi, urging everyone to uphold peace and resist being provoked.

The Governor of South Sulawesi, Andi Sudirman Sulaiman, responded to the Makassar unrest by calling for calm after an arson attack on the legislative building that resulted in fatalities. He held a dialogue with protesters to de-escalate tensions, urging unity and mutual respect to preserve peace in the region.

In response to demonstrations and riots, the Surabaya City Government (Pemkot Surabaya) reactivated Community-Based Security squad (PAM Swakarsa), a voluntary community security initiative, to enhance local protection and promote resident unity. Mayor Eri Cahyadi described it as a means for communities to safeguard their environments, aligning with Surabaya's status as the City of Heroes.

=== House of Representatives ===
Shortly following the protests, on 29 August Sahroni was dismissed from his position as deputy chairman of the third commission and was assigned as a regular parliamentarian at the first commission. The NasDem Party rejected that the change was a result of his statement, claiming that it was a "regular rotation". After the changes, Sahroni and several parliament members was reported to have left for Singapore. Indonesian internet users criticized Sahroni, calling the alleged escape cowardly and irresponsible, and demanded accountability from him. A photo of Eko Patrio that was seen shopping in a counterfeit goods market in Guangzhou also went viral on X. Political scientist Aisah Putri Budiatri criticized the trips as unnecessary and indulgent, with elements of leisure rather than official duty, and warned that larger and more intense protests could erupt.

Following the sacking of Sahroni's house, Eko Patrio, Uya Kuya and Nafa Urbach offered their apologies and promised that they will do better as parliamentarians. Eko Patrio's apology featured fellow PAN parliamentarian Sigit Purnomo Said who stated that they were both in Jakarta amid viral posts that stated Eko may be in China. However, their apologies were considered too late as protesters also ransacked their houses. Political analyst Hendri Satrio had asked the four members of parliament to resign to appease public anger "if they still love their country". Ahmad Sahroni finally apologized for his statements but refused to return to Indonesia for his safety. His apology fell short as he proceeded to blame his neighbors who had helped to loot his house. He was last spotted boarding a Singapore Airlines flight to Frankfurt. NasDem caucus leader Viktor Laiskodat later clarified that the account that made the apology and later the accusation was not Sahroni's official account but rather someone who impersonates him. PDI-P member of parliament Rieke Diah Pitaloka reminded fellow members to "watch their tongues", stating they will always face criticisms no matter what they say as it was the risk of the job they swore under oath. She also admitted that many members of the parliament often make controversial statements.

Rahayu Saraswati, member of parliament and niece of President Prabowo Subianto, announced her resignation on 10 September 2025 because of a statement she made on an interview held early February that was then cut by an unknown instigator to stoke protests against her. Regardless of the intentions from the instigator, she held full responsibility for her own words. Her resignation gained praise from the public, to the point that former Coordinating Minister of Law and Security Affairs Mahfud MD praised her for her maturity and called her a "victim" in politics. However, some online reactions also speculated that Saraswati's resignation may be connected to the vacant position of Ministry of Youth and Sports, in which she quickly denies and said that it is impossible for her to take the position as long as her uncle is still the president. Eventually, her resignation was rejected by the DPR.

House of Representatives speaker Puan Maharani shared condolences and demanded that the national police chief resolve the matter quickly. Puan also offered a new motorcycle to Affan's father, who also worked as an online taxi driver, a move that was decried as tone deaf. The House of Representatives later clarified that the allowance hike will only be given until October 2025 and claimed that the amount given is far cheaper than giving official residences for members. Deputy Speaker of the People's Consultative Assembly Lestari Moerdijat told members of parliament to self introspect themselves in carrying out the mandate given by the people.

Gerindra Party caucus leader and majority leader Budi Djiwandono urged the House of Representatives to reevaluate the allowance hike for members of the parliament. He barred his caucus from going overseas and told members to be present with the people in accordance to Prabowo's instructions as party leader. Following suit, PDI-P caucus leader Said Abdullah also called for the allowance hike and any other allowances that may damage moral ethics to be cancelled for empathetic and ethical reasons. Golkar caucus leader Sarmuji also agreed with the calls of reevaluation and reminded Golkar members to refrain from making gestures that may spark more public anger, while Democratic Party caucus leader Edhie Yudhoyono called for parliamentarians to reflect themselves and agreed to have the allowance reevaluated.

After Ahmad Sahroni and Nafa Urbach's houses were looted by mobs, NasDem Party chairman Surya Paloh announced the suspension of both Sahroni and Urbach's membership in the House of Representatives as a response to public discontent. The suspension will be effective on 1 September. PAN Chairman Zulkifli Hasan released a memo, urging members to not flaunt their wealth and be arrogant. Uya Kuya and Eko Patrio had reportedly resign from the House of Representatives. Deputy Speaker Adies Kadir (Golkar), who had defended the DPR allowance hike, was also suspended from his party and his seat, including the leadership position. Public pressure turned towards the PDI-P as calls for Deddy Sitorus to resign mounted due to his offensive statements. Said Abdullah later apologized on behalf of Deddy Sitorus' statement and Sadarestuwati's viral dancing during the 2025 Annual Session. University of Indonesia law expert Titi Anggraini criticized the term as ambiguous and an attempt at appease public anger temporarily. According to her, the suspension has no legal basis, as parliament members could only be either declared "dead, resigned, or removed". Titi stated that the suspension did not affect their membership in parliament and that the suspended members retained full rights, including salary and facilities.

Deputy Speaker of the House of Representatives, Sufmi Dasco Ahmad, promised to hold a session with all political party factions in parliament on 4 September 2025 to discuss the 17+8 Demands outlined by activists. He also said that one of the demands, which is the cancellation of lawmakers perks, has been implemented. On 3 September, during a meeting with student representatives, Dasco apologized on behalf of parliament and admitted that the body has not done its function properly.

At the open meeting on 5 September, Sufmi Dasco stated that the House of Representatives agreed to stop providing housing allowances to its members, effective from 31 August.

In response to the large-scale demonstrations sparked by the spread of a video deemed insensitive by members of the House of Representatives (DPR), they clarified that it was misinformation. Uya Kuya emphasized that the video about the DPR and its content was an interview conducted in early January 2025. The original video was unrelated to the narratives of the circulated video in the internet which incited mass demonstration. Eko Patrio also stated that the video depicting DPR members dancing due to an increase in allowances was manipulated, as the actual context of the video was DPR members celebrating an orchestral entertainment session from the Praditya Wiratama Symphony Orchestra of the Defense University, not about the increase of allowance.

=== Public ===
Former State Intelligence Agency Chair A.M. Hendropriyono said the riots were further instigated by non-state actors and baselessly named George Soros as the "main suspect" behind the intensifying riots. Hendropriyono's words were similarly echoed by Russian state media outlet Sputnik stating that Soros and National Endowment for Democracy may have funded the riots for geopolitical purposes as part of a colour revolution. This claim was flagged as a misinformation campaign by the Fact Check Coalition (Indonesian: Koalisi Cek Fakta) stating that it was not backed by verifiable evidence. Tempo and Kompas releases a counterclaim that accuses several foreign journalists including Sputnik and a network of influencers for foreign interference. Nury Vittachi, one of the mentioned influencers in the claims, criticize the counterclaim as baseless and validating Tempo's claim as a "western narrative".

In response to the central government's stances, stand-up comedian and opposition critic Pandji Pragiwaksono angrily stated that "Indonesians will no longer accept dialogue, we're now angry. You cannot dialogue with someone who is angry".

Law expert and opposition critic Refly Harun stated that the protests and later the intensifying riots because of the death of Affan Kurniawan was caused by "an accumulation of 10 years of malpractice on power" by President Jokowi and listed prior transgressions such as forced land seizures, the controversy on his university diploma, rampant corruption, and criminalization of Islamic clerics and political parties. Harun proposed two solutions to heal the country, which are have Jokowi be tried for his crimes and have Gibran impeached.

In response to numerous misinformation and provocations, many internet users and activists urged the public not to fall for racial provocation that has been widely spread on the social media and stay focused on the main cause.

According to the National Commission on Human Rights, the death toll has reached ten.

==== Online taxi companies ====
Gojek confirmed that Affan was a partner driver and offered condolences and support to his family. Both Gojek and Grab Indonesia updated their social media profiles to display black profile pictures as a sign of mourning. Additionally CEO of Gojek parent company GoTo, Patrick Walujo visited Affan family to express his condolences.

Separately, Grab confirmed that Moh Umar Amarudin is a partner driver and offered condolences to Affan's family. Grab CEO Anthony Tan visited Makassar, South Sulawesi and visited the grieving family of another driver affiliated with Grab, Rusdamdiansyah who was killed by demonstrators because demonstrators falsely accused him as a government sleeper agent. Tan promised support for the deceased's family in the form of logistical support and health support for 2 years as well as joint venture capital through GrabKios.

==== Religious organizations ====
On August 31, Asrorun Niam Sholeh, Head of the Fatwa Division of the Indonesian Ulema Council (MUI), urged the public to stop looting and vandalizing public facilities during demonstrations. Niam stated that, in his opinion, expressing aspirations, even in anger, should not be accompanied by anarchy, looting, and/or theft of other people's property, as this violates religious law and statutory provisions.

Muhammadiyah chairman Haedar Nashir urged government and legislative officials to be more self-aware, engage in introspection, and avoid hurting the feelings of the people as the people need a role model from those in charge. Nahdlatul Ulama scholar Miftachul Achyar urged all sides to remain patient and clear-headed in facing the situation. He encouraged all parties to prioritize dialogue in handling demonstrations.

The Communion of Churches in Indonesia released statements expressed their condolences for those who died during the demonstrations and expressed for the government to listen to the protesters' demands, repeal policies that negatively impact society, and transparency in the lawmaking process. The Indonesian Christian Church Synod condemned the lack of empathy and self awareness of the government and parliament, as well as the excessive police brutality displayed in putting order during the demonstrations. The Bishops' Conference of Indonesia also offered condolences to the victims and urged the government to listen to the people's aspirations and to repeal legislations that will negatively affect the people. Several Christian spiritual leaders has also voiced their opinion regarding the situation. Reverend Franz Magnis-Suseno stated than the current demonstration was prompted by public anger and grievances during the National Conscience Movement press conference in Jakarta. At the same conference, Archbishop of Jakarta, Cardinal Ignatius Suharyo also call for "national repentance" and urge executive, legislative, and judicial bodies to reflect their mistakes and commit systemic reforms in order to return to calm.

==== Civil organizations ====
Indonesian Legal Aid Foundation (YLBHI) reacted to the speech Prabowo gave when he was accompanied by all party leaders and condemned Prabowo for his failure to understand the root cause of the anger and stated that it was not only about the rude statements made from a few members of House of Representatives but rather the wasted money that went to politicians instead of the people who really need it. YLBHI called on the police to stop any form of brutality and have the police force reformed while demanded that all protesters to be released without preconditions.

Amnesty International Indonesia's Executive Director, Usman Hamid, stated that the Indonesian government has labeled demonstrators with accusations ranging from terrorism to treason. This was in response to a press conference held by President Prabowo, who ordered the National Police Chief and the National Armed Forces Commander to fire rubber bullets if demonstrators attacked police headquarters. He said the government has exaggerated the labeling of public demonstrations with accusations of treason and terrorism. This was also accompanied by continuous accusations by the government using the narrative of 'foreign interference' and 'spreading conflict' when people are demonstrating to voice their aspirations regarding problematic government policies.

==== Universities ====
Gadjah Mada University Civitas led by rector Ova Emilia issued a statement on the demonstrations. It expressed deep concerns on the current situation and called for all sides to exercise calm and prevent anarchic actions to persist. UGM urged the government and parliament to repeal policies that are not in favor of justice, increasing the gap between the political elite and the people, threatening the sustainability of democracy and civil supremacy, and benefiting the interests of the political elite and oligarchic groups. She encouraged students to voice their aspirations on a constructive manner while looking after for their own safety. Finally, UGM urged state administrators and authorities to listen carefully to the public's aspirations and for the police and military to adhere to the principles of responsiveness and accountability in taking strategic and tactical steps to ensure the situation is under control, prevent further casualties, and restore public order and security quickly.

=== Foreign response ===
Following the violent demonstrations, both the United States and Canada issued formal advisories urging their citizens in Indonesia to avoid protest areas. The U.S. Embassy in Jakarta specifically warned Americans to steer clear of demonstrations, particularly those near Mobile Brigade Corps (Brimob) locations. In parallel, Canada released updated travel guidance advising its nationals to exercise heightened caution in Indonesia due to the ongoing protests. Simultaneously, Taiwan and the United Kingdom also issued the same warning for their nationals residing in Indonesia. Australia issued a level 2 travel advisory to Indonesia. Several other nations also issued warnings urging their citizens to exercise caution in Indonesia amid the protests, including Malaysia, Singapore, France, and Japan.

The French football club Olympique de Marseille posted a tribute to Affan and Umar on their official Instagram account, featuring a photo of player Pierre-Emile Højbjerg saluting alongside the victims' names.

Malaysian Deputy Prime Minister Ahmad Zahid Hamidi expressed his confidence in the Prabowo government's ability to resolve the unrest in a peaceful manner when he was approached by the media during the 11th Quran Hour 2025 in Masjid Negara and suggested dialogue to return to calm.

During the protests, nationals from other Southeast Asian countries, such as Malaysia, Singapore and Thailand, ordered food through Grab and Gojek and instructed drivers to share the meals with fellow drivers affected by the demonstrations. In some cases, these users placed orders from restaurants in around the country and sent messages in Indonesian asking drivers to distribute the food as an act of solidarity. However, this international support movement for Indonesian motorcycle taxi drivers saw potential setbacks due to escalating violence. In the Philippines, citizens' historical trauma from past political unrest, particularly the Marcos-era martial law, led to hesitation in sustaining support as violent riots and looting intensified. Similarly, solidarity from Malaysia and other Southeast Asian nations reportedly drew back as deadly riots, including widespread looting, heightened concerns among supporters wary of political instability.

On 1 September, the Office of the United Nations High Commissioner for Human Rights urged Indonesia to conduct prompt, thorough, and transparent investigations into the deaths of six people during the protests. It emphasized the need for dialogue to address public concerns, security forces to follow the international norms on the use of force, protection of rights to peaceful assembly and free expression, and importance of media freedom during unrest. However, Ministry of Human Rights Natalius Pigai said the OHCHR's statements came in too late as he claimed Indonesia had conducted quick steps three days prior while Dave Laksono (Golkar) said that Indonesia has its own law mechanisms to deal with the problem.

Chinese Ministry of Foreign Affairs' spokesperson Guo Jiakun urged the Indonesian government to take effective measures to protect Chinese nationals within the country. He also stated that China fully understood Prabowo's reasoning to not attend the 2025 Tianjin SCO summit and the 2025 China Victory Day Parade and respected the urgency of the situation. However, Prabowo decided to resume his invitation to the Victory Day Parade and went to China on 2 September 2025, to which Prasetyo Hadi clarified that General Secretary of the Chinese Communist Party Xi Jinping hoped for his presence from 31 August 2025 and the Chinese government had pleaded for Prabowo's presence for at least only on the date of the parade. While meeting Prabowo, Xi expressed his confidence that Prabowo can stabilize the nation.

== Impact ==
=== Arrests and missing ===
Metro Jaya Regional Police arrested 1,240 individuals linked to riots in Jakarta on 29 August 2025 that caused damages worth Rp 55 billion. Most detainees were not Jakarta residents, originating from West Java, Banten, and Central Java. Police have identified perpetrators of vandalism and looting, with further arrests planned.

Central Java Police arrested 327 individuals, mostly teenagers, during a sweep on Jalan Pahlawan, Semarang, on 30 August 2025, for alleged involvement in anarchic actions following a protest. Seven were named suspects, while the rest were released with mandatory reporting status.

In late August 2025, Jakarta's Metro Jaya Police arrested an activist named Syahdan Husein for inciting violence allegation via social media during the week of protests. This arrest sparked debates about free speech.

On 31 August, Laras Faizati Khairunnisa, an ASEAN Inter-Parliamentary Assembly (AIPA) employee, was arrested for posting an Instagram story inciting arson at the National Police Headquarters. AIPA fired her by September 5. In Bandung, dozens of suspected provocateurs were arrested by authorities during a demonstration that ended in the 2025 UNISBA and UNPAS campus clashes. Police stated that they arrested several suspects, including two who were found to be carrying a softgun filled with marbles and marijuana.

In September, the Anti-anarchist Police Task Force arrested several people in relation with the riots, such as some activists named Saiful Amin, Delpedro Marhaen, and five others for inciting violence and spreading hoaxes regarding Labour Party president Said Iqbal, Another suspect who was arrested was a TikTok influencer named Figha Lesmana, on the charge of provoking students to protest and urging other influencers to transmit her message. Furthermore, the South Sulawesi Regional Police designated 53 people as suspects related to the torching of the regional parliament buildings, of whom 11 were underaged.

On 25 September, the Indonesian Police's Criminal Investigation Agency announced that they had arrested 52 suspects related to the lootings on the homes of politicians (i.e. four parliament members and Sri Mulyani).

44 people were initially reported as missing by the Commission for Missing Persons and Victims of Violence, but forty were identified as having been arrested, with some being further persecuted while others were released. Two further missing persons were later found outside Jakarta – one in East Java and another in Central Kalimantan. It was revealed in the press conference that the two, Bima and Eko, were not missing during the mass protest, but rather goes outside their hometown for business trip on the same week.

The other two, Muhammad Farhan Hamid and Reno Syahputra Dewo, remained missing. Two bodies were later found inside a building burned down during 29 August's rioting in Kwitang on 30 October, and were identified as Hamid and Dewo. According to police forensic reports, the two had likely fainted in the burning building from smoke inhalation, and burned to death.

=== Economy ===
On 29 August 2025, Indonesia's financial markets experienced significant turmoil due to escalating political protests. The IDX Composite (IHSG) plummeted by 2.27%, marking its steepest decline in over two weeks. Simultaneously, the rupiah weakened by nearly 1% against the U.S. dollar, reaching its lowest point since 1 August at Rp 16,475. In response, Bank Indonesia announced interventions in both domestic and offshore foreign exchange markets to stabilize the rupiah and pledged continued purchases of government bonds. By 30 August, the situation showed signs of stabilization. The week saw IHSG soften by 0.36%, ending at 7,830.49, while total market activity surged, daily transaction values increased by 40%, reflecting heightened volatility, yet foreign buying continued to support the market's structural resilience. The IHSG plummeted further by 3.34% at its opening on 1 September.

The protests resulted in stocks and the rupiah declining, prompting Bank Indonesia to announce its readiness to intervene to stabilize the currency. Convera and Bloomberg Intelligence noted that investors were reassessing the risks of social unrest, leading to a short-term selloff. Another drop would occur following Sri Mulyani's resignation as Finance Minister.

=== Infrastructure ===
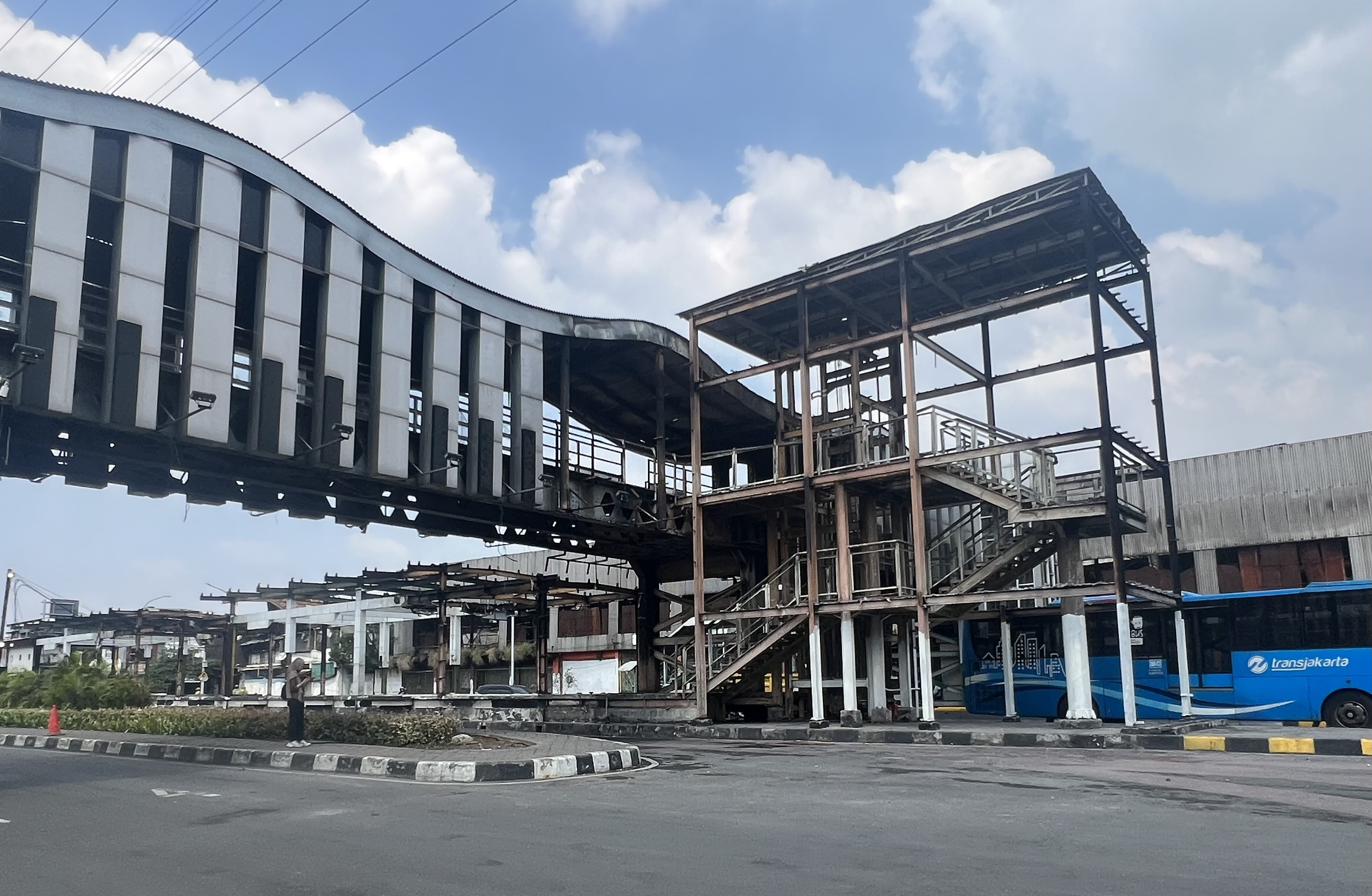
The Senen Transjakarta station after it was set on fire during the protests, with the loading bay being the most damaged section.

Widespread unrest inflicted extensive damage on Indonesia's public infrastructure and facilities. The Senen Toyota Rangga Transjakarta station was severely burned, leaving the structure inactive and unusable. In Senen, looting erupted on the afternoon of 29 August amid intense demonstrations near the Brimob headquarters. Amid a barrage of tear gas and heightened tensions, protesters began ransacking nearby shops, seizing items like wooden tables, computer monitors, metal boxes, folding bicycles, water dispensers, and stainless-steel cabinets before carrying them toward Senen Station.

In Surabaya, Hotel Sahid Surabaya was damaged amid protest-related chaos. Stones, paving blocks, and trash bins were hurled at the hotel's glass lobby, shattering windows. Grahadi State Building suffered severe destruction, particularly on its western side. Reports indicate that by the next morning, people and officials observed complete charring of key ceremonial rooms, including the vice governor's office, press room, and administrative chambers, where electronic equipment was either destroyed or looted. Tegalsari Police Sector building, a structure designated as a cultural heritage built in 1924, was burned down on 29 August. Approximately 90% of the building was destroyed, with only the mosque at the rear remaining intact; even the mosque suffered partial damage, including collapsed ceiling panels and scattered debris.

Protesters set fire to several regional legislative (DPRD) buildings across Indonesia, resulting in severe damage. In Makassar, rioters torched the city's DPRD building, leading to three deaths and five injuries. In Mataram, the provincial DPRD building was destroyed by fire and looting, with most documents and assets rendered unsalvageable. In Kediri, demonstrators torched the city's DPRD building, destroying key areas like the lobby, plenary and commission rooms. In total, as of 31 August 2025, 37 local parliament buildings in different regions have been destroyed or damaged. The destroyed parliament buildings and government offices are spread out across 19 different provinces, and it was estimated that reconstruction effort would take at least six months.

Due to damage on toll gates, safety equipment, and CCTVs in toll roads, the state-owned toll road company Jasa Marga announced the temporary closure of seven toll roads for repairs.

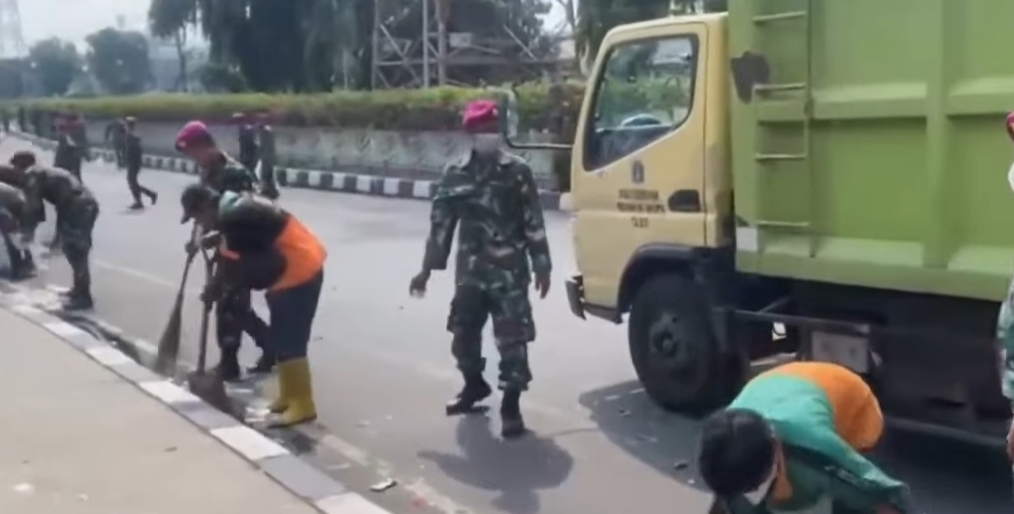
The Marine Corps assisted in Central Jakarta City cleanup of public areas after the protests.

Nationwide infrastructure damage was estimated at nearly Rp 900 billion (US$53 million), with Jakarta alone accounting for approximately Rp 50.4 billion of the total. The Ministry of Public Works earmarked this amount for urgent rehabilitation efforts, prioritizing repairs to essential infrastructure such as toll roads, TransJakarta and MRT stations, as well as DPRD buildings.

=== Public transport ===
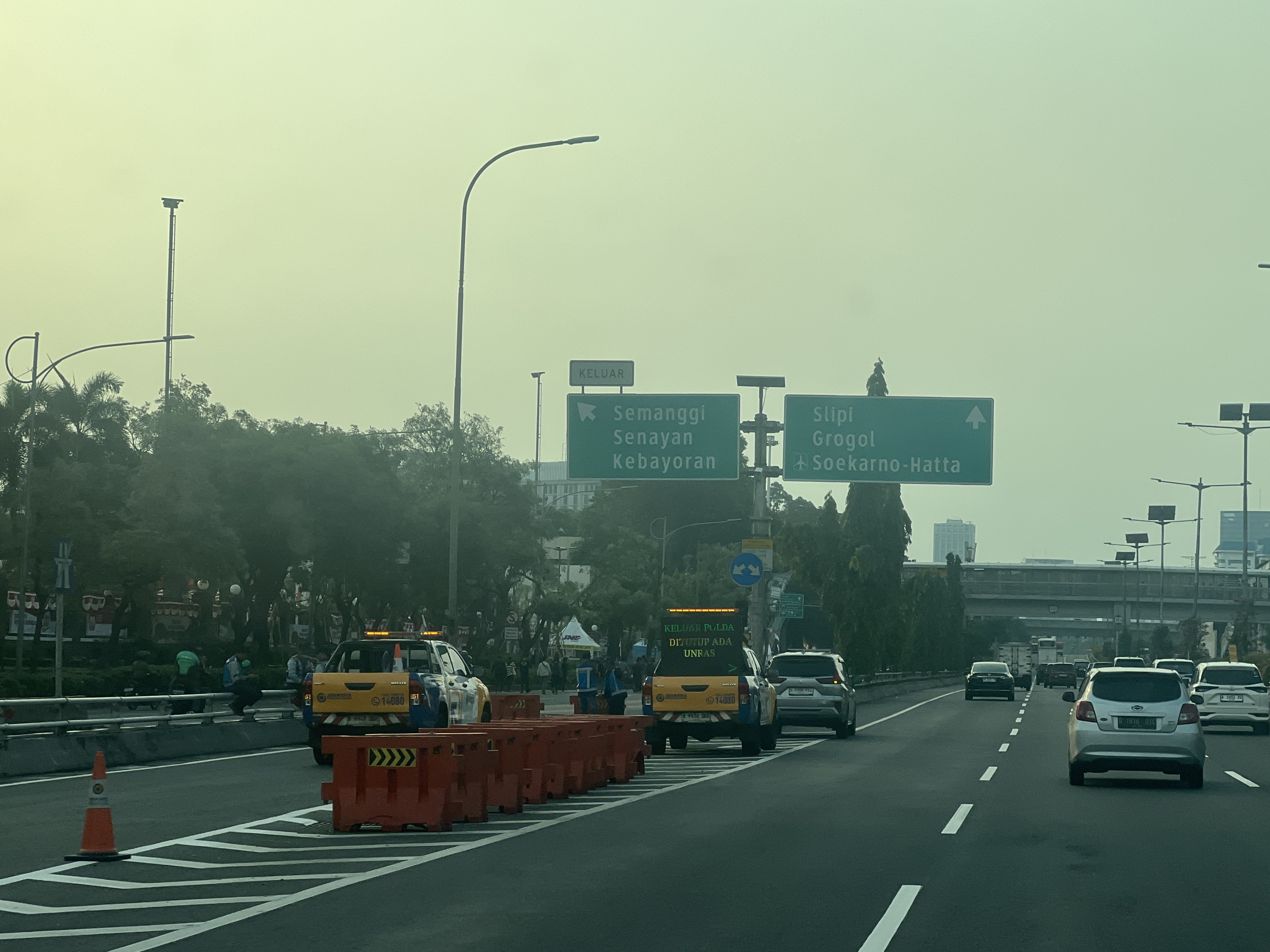
A Jakarta Inner Ring Road exit near the provincial police building, closed off during the protests

The protests in Jakarta led to significant disruptions in the city's transportation infrastructure. Transjakarta, the capital's primary bus rapid transit system, suspended all operations due to safety concerns stemming from ongoing demonstrations and damaged facilities. Bus stops near the Mobile Brigade headquarters in Senen and the Jakarta police headquarters were set ablaze, rendering several routes inoperative. In response, Transjakarta diverted numerous routes, including BRT, non-BRT, and Mikrotrans services, to mitigate risks and ensure public safety. Jakarta's MRT services were also significantly disrupted. MRT Jakarta implemented a limited service pattern, operating only between Lebak Bulus and Blok M station. This decision was made amidst demonstrations near key stations such as Istora Mandiri and ASEAN, which were temporarily closed. Due to extensive damage to the transportation infrastructure, the Jakarta regional government decided to make Jakarta MRT and Transjakarta free of charge for a week beginning on 30 August.

On 29 August, protests in Surabaya led to several Suroboyo Bus, Wirawiri Suroboyo, and Trans Semanggi Suroboyo routes being rerouted, with several line services ending prematurely at 20:35 WIB. Trans Semanggi resumed partial service in the morning of 31 August, bypassing stops affected by the riots near Grahadi.

=== Shopping malls ===
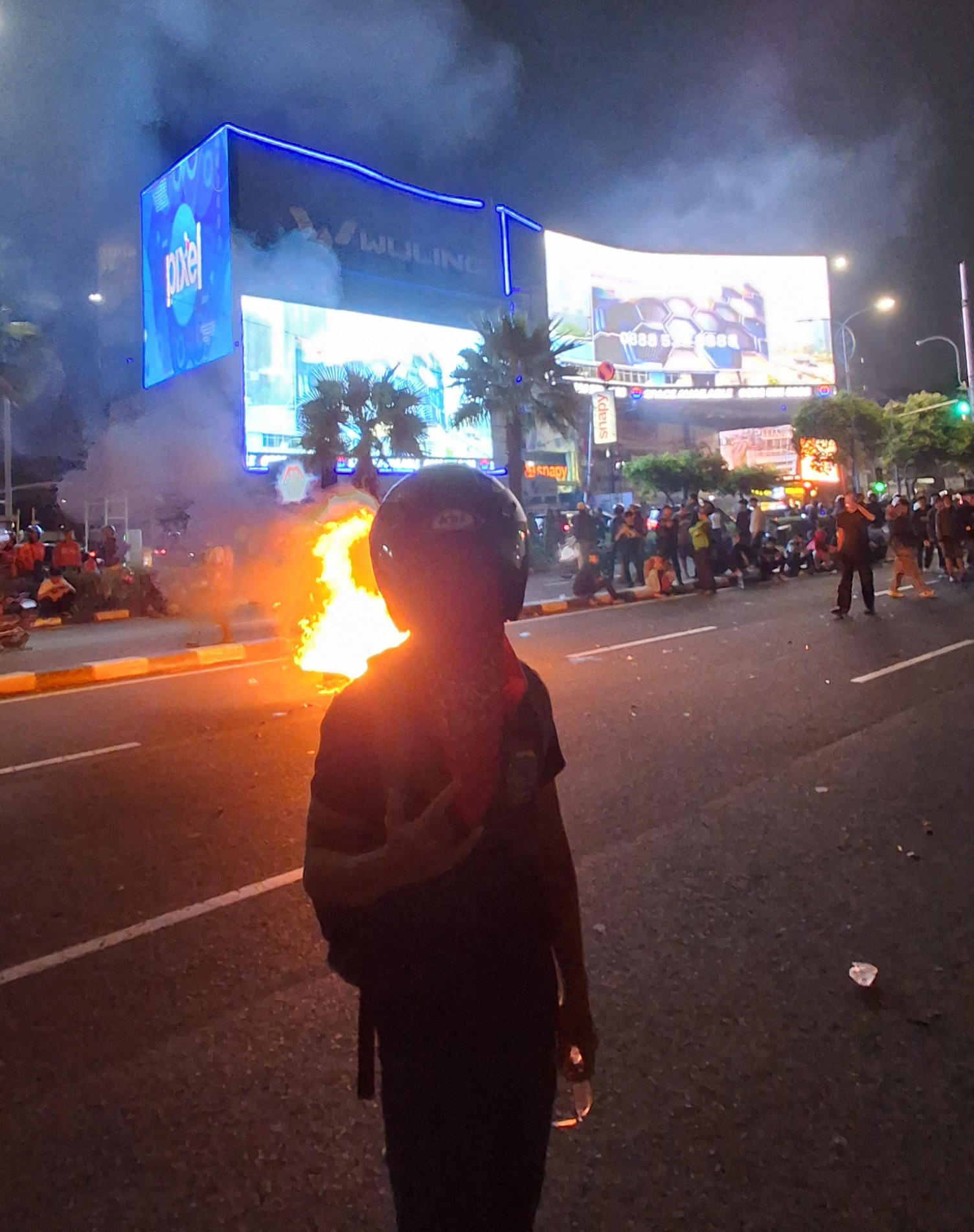
Protesters in front of Senayan City mall, 28 August.

The protest affected operations of numerous shopping malls in big cities across Indonesia, mainly in Jakarta and Surabaya which were forced to temporarily shut down or reduce its operating hours in the aftermath of the 28 August violent protests. The malls affected by the protests were:

- Atrium Senen, located near the Mobile Brigade Corps headquarters in Kwitang, was closed on 29 August until further notice due to safety concerns.
- Senayan Park and Lippo Mall Nusantara, both owned by Lippo Group reduced its operational hours to 12:30 WIB due to the malls' close proximity to the MPR/DPR building complex.
- Several staff of luxury boutiques in Plaza Senayan and Senayan City such as Dior, Fendi, Bvlgari, and Louis Vuitton was seen removing the display items from their stores to avoid lootings after the spillover of 28 August protest in nearby MPR/DPR building complex affected both malls. Several stores such as Burberry and Bottega Veneta decided to close its store entirely until further notice.
- Plaza Indonesia that was located Jalan M.H. Thamrin was also seen to follow suit of two luxury malls in Senayan to remove displays from the luxury boutique inside the mall with Cartier and Audemars Piguet being the most notable store to do so.
- Sarinah Jakarta reduced its operating hours to 16:00 WIB and was heavily barricaded after its closure.
- Plaza Surabaya, located in Pemuda Street, was evacuated and was shut down on 16:00 WIB after protests in nearby Gedung Grahadi turned violent.
- Tunjungan Plaza was forced to close its doors on 19:00 WIB after the spillover of the protest in Grahadi reached Tunjungan Street. Additionally Tunjungan Plaza management announced the halt of its operations on 30 August due to safety concerns. Additionally Indonesian Marine Corps tanks were also seen guarding Tunjungan Plaza after the riot.
- A small police station within the Ayani Mega Mall complex in Pontianak, West Kalimantan, was set on fire after the demonstration moved from the Digulis Monument near Tanjungpura University to Ahmad Yani Street.
- Since the morning of 30 August, numerous Indonesian Army Anoa armoured personnel carriers were seen guarding Puri Indah Mall and Mall Taman Anggrek.
- Pakuwon Mall Jogja closed for a day on 30 August, following a demonstration that took place the day before around the mall area.

Additionally, the Indonesian Shopping Mall Management Association (APPBI) Chairman Alphonzus Widjaja urged the government to act wiser to address the developing situation.

=== Digital rights ===
SAFEnet, an Indonesian digital rights watchdog, noted that the phone numbers of civil society leaders organizations were distributed as the number of parliament members, leading to spam and threats. Additionally, the watchdog also noted content moderation, feature restrictions, and power outages in protest hubs in Jakarta and Bandung, which hindered information flow, as well as the suspension of the live-streaming features of TikTok and Instagram, which affected both protest documentation and small business operations. Digital disruption was furthered with the suspected arson of optical cable servers in Jakarta. The suspension of TikTok's live-streaming feature was one of the "[voluntary] additional safeguards to keep TikTok a safe and civil space" by the platform, while the government claimed that disinformation was spreading through various social media platforms. Despite this, actor Fedi Nuril called Minister of Digital Affairs Meutya Hafid a liar in a tweet while Jerome Polin expressed suspicion that there may be forces at play behind the "voluntary" suspension.

=== Education ===
Major universities in Jakarta, Bandung, Makassar, Yogyakarta, and Surabaya, including the University of Indonesia, Bandung Institute of Technology, Hasanuddin University, and Gadjah Mada University implemented online learning to ensure student safety and maintain academic continuity in the midst of the protests. Similar measures were also implemented for schools in Jakarta, Bandung, Surabaya, Yogyakarta, and Palembang. The minister of primary and secondary education Abdul Mu'ti proposed implementing a nationwide online learning for schools in the vicinity of protest areas following a meeting with president Prabowo.

== See also ==
=== Protests in Indonesia ===
- Malari incident
- 27 July 1996 incident
- May 1998 riots of Indonesia
  - Trisakti shootings
  - Semanggi shootings
- 1999 East Timor independence referendum
- 2016-7 Islamist protests in Jakarta
  - November 2016 Jakarta protests
  - December 2016 Jakarta protests
  - February 2017 Jakarta protests
- May 2019 Jakarta protests and riots
- 2019 Indonesian protests and riots
- 2019 Papua protests
- Indonesia omnibus law protests
- 2022 Indonesian student protests
- 2024 Indonesian local election law protests
- 2025 Indonesian protests
  - 2025 Pati demonstrations
  - 2025 Jakarta Fairmont Hotel occupation
  - 2025 UNISBA and UNPAS campus clashes
- Asian Spring
