= Moshe Ber Beck =

American rabbi (1934–2021)

Rabbi Moshe Ber Beck
- משה בער בעק
- Moshe Ber Beck at an anti-Zionist rally in Washington, D.C. against the 2006 Lebanon War

Personal life
- Born: 17 May 1934 Nyírbogát, Kingdom of Hungary
- Died: 15 April 2021 (aged 86) Monsey, New York, United States
- Spouse: Bracha Eisenbach (m. 1959)
- Children: Elhanan Beck
- Parents: Yeshaye Yosef Beck (father); Sarah Beck (mother)
- Occupation: Rabbi

Religious life
- Religion: Judaism

Jewish leader
- Organisation: Neturei Karta
- Residence: Monsey, New York, United States

Moshe Ber Beck (Yiddish: משה בער בעק; May 17, 1934 – April 15, 2021), or Moshe Dov Beck (משה דוב בעק), was a Hungarian-born American rabbi and anti-Zionist activist. He was the leader of one of the Neturei Karta branches in the United States.

== Personal life ==
Moshe Ber Beck was born in Nyírbogát, Hungary. His early childhood was spent hiding with his brother from Nazi persecution until 1945, when Soviet troops took Budapest. In 1948, he migrated to Bnei Brak, Israel, where he began yeshiva studies. In 1959, he married Bracha, the daughter of rabbi Shalom "Zeev" (or "Velvel") Eisenbach, and at that time joined Neturei Karta, leaving the Vizhnitz Hasidic movement of which he had formerly been a part and inspired for his strong opposition to Zionism. He subsequently lived in Monsey, New York, where he worked as a rabbi and anti-Zionist activist.

Beck died from complications related to COVID-19 on 15 April 2021. He was 86 years old.

== Views and advocacy ==
=== Anti-Zionist campaigning ===
Moshe Ber Beck, along with other rabbis such as Yisroel Dovid Weiss, was known as a Haredi opponent of Zionism, but, like all of Neturei Karta, to an extent which put him far beyond the mainstream Haredi viewpoint. He was one of the leaders of Neturei Karta in the U.S. Among other activities, he participated in a visit to Iran in 2006 during which he met with President Mahmoud Ahmadinejad to publicize Haredi opposition to Zionism. Beck denounced what he considered a political use of the Holocaust by what he called the Zionist establishment. In 2014, he appeared in a lengthy interview on the documentary Judaism in the Era of Zionism in which he laid out his anti-Zionist viewpoint.

Beck's opposition to Zionism was based, he claimed, upon the works of Satmar founder Joel Teitelbaum (especially Vayoel Moshe, a lengthy work which aims to demonstrate that Jews are commanded by the Torah to remain in exile until redeemed by the messiah and are therefore prohibited to establish an independent country).

=== Disputes with Satmar ===
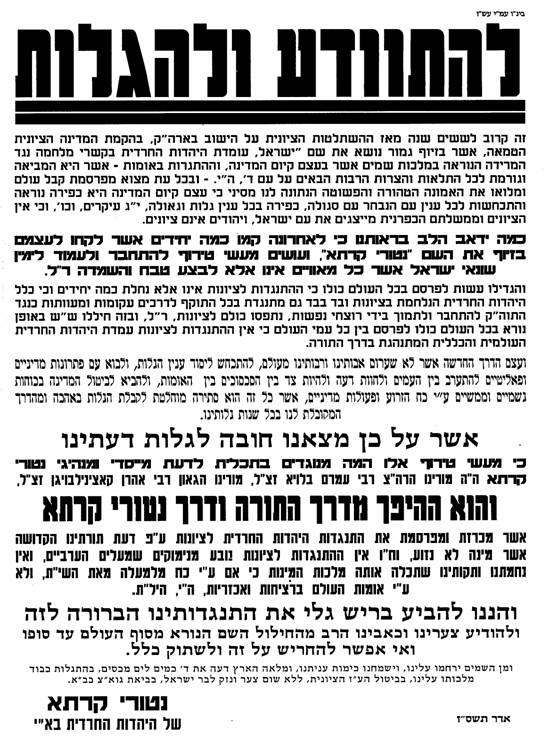
Pashkevil against Beck's actions, signed in the name of Neturei Karta in Israel

Although Beck's positions were based on Satmar's guiding ideas, this did not prevent a mutual distancing between him and the Hasidic group. Rabbi Moshe Ber Beck distanced himself from Satmar due to a previous dispute with members of the leadership of said religious movement regarding the suitability of the kosher meat certificates that its rabbis issued. Subsequently, the differences deepened with Rabbi Beck visit to Iran and his meeting with Ahmadinejad, Satmar accused Beck of allying with enemies of the Jewish people, and consequently Satmar Court condemned Neturei Karta's "fanaticism."

== List of works ==
Moshe Ber Beck's works include:

- The Jewish Home (1977)
- Derech Hatzola
- Kumi Tzuee
- Shulem Bayis
- Shabbos
