= Zundel Kroizer =

Israeli rabbi (1924–2014)

Rabbi Zundel Kroizer זונדל קרויזר
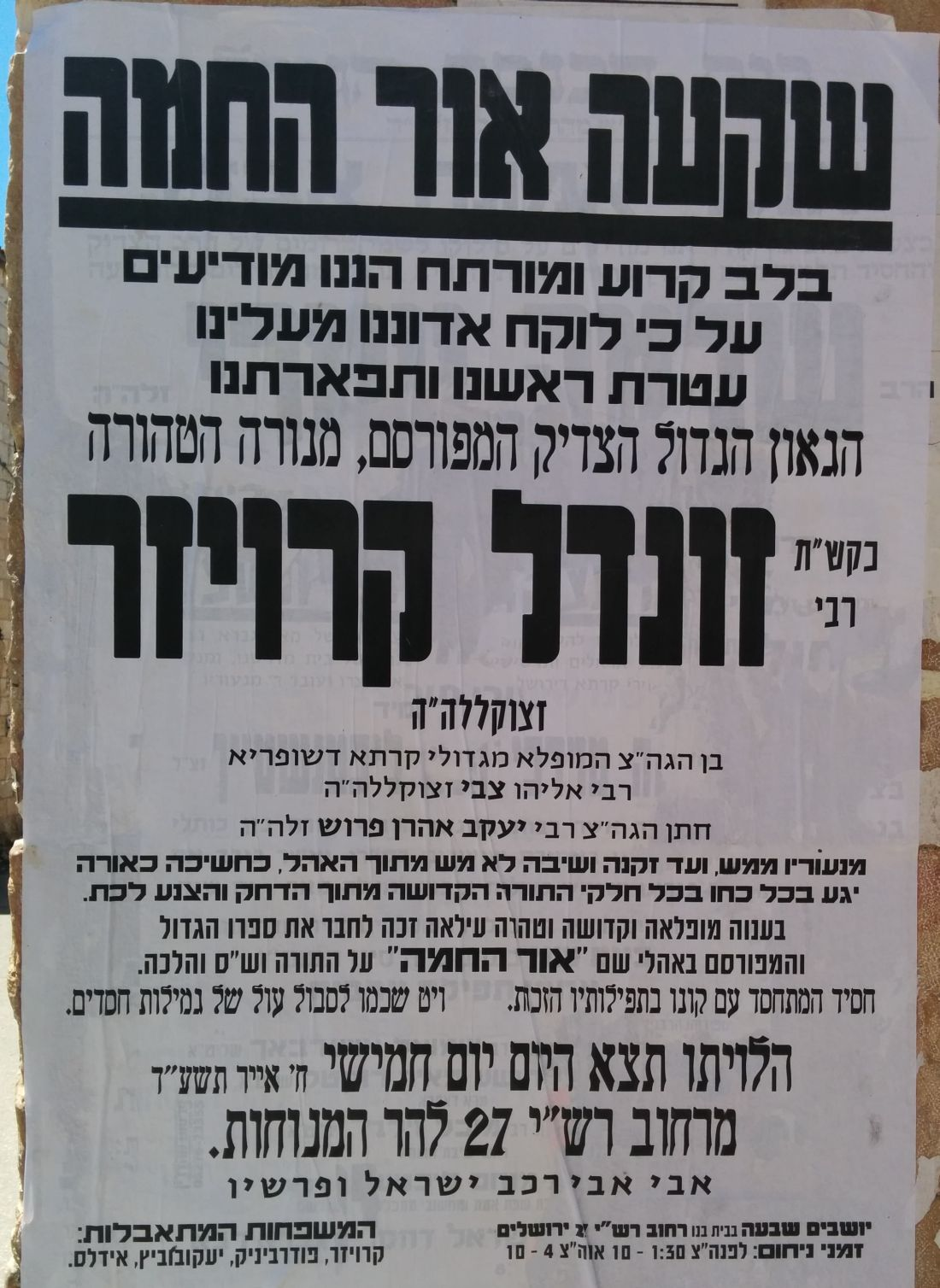
- Rabbi Zundel Kroizer mourning poster

Personal life
- Born: Zundel Kroizer; 25 November 1924 Jerusalem
- Died: 7 May 2014 (aged 89) Jerusalem

Religious life
- Religion: Judaism
- Denomination: Haredi
- Yeshiva: Tchebin yeshiva
- Residence: Jerusalem

Zundel Kroizer (Hebrew: זונדל קרויזר; 25 November 1924 - 7 May 2014) was a Haredi Israeli rabbi and the author of sefer Ohr Hachamah on the entire Talmud, Shulchan Aruch, Five Chumashim and the Haggadah shel Pesach.

He was born in Jerusalem to Rabbi Tzvi Hersh Kroizer. In his youth, he studied at the Etz Chaim Yeshiva in Jerusalem. He married the daughter of Rabbi Aharon Porush, treasurer of the Etz Chaim Yeshiva and author of Ephah Sh'lemah on the Talmud.

Over the years, he served as melamed at various cheders and talmud Torahs including the Meah Shearim Talmud Torah and the cheder of Belz in Bnei Brak. He once spent a year establishing a school in Lugano, Switzerland.

During the last 25 years of his life, he was employed by the Tchebin yeshiva in Jerusalem to answer the students' questions.

He died in May 2014 at Shaare Zedek Medical Center. At his funeral, he was eulogized by several rabbis, including Rabbis Shmuel Auerbach and Gamliel Rabinowitz. He was interred on Har HaMenuchot.
