= Sikrikim =

Haredi Jewish militant organization

- סיקריקים
- Leader: Shmuel Weissfish
- Dates active: 2005
- Headquarters: Meah Shearim and Ramat Beit Shemesh
- Active regions: Israel; Palestine
- Ideology: Haredi Judaism; Anti-Zionism
- Wars: Israeli–Palestinian conflict

The Sikrikim (Hebrew: סיקריקים) is a Haredi Jewish organization based in the Israeli Haredi neighbourhoods Meah Shearim in Jerusalem and in Ramat Beit Shemesh. The anti-Zionist group is thought to have roughly 100 activist members. The Sikrikim gained international attention for acts of violence they committed against Orthodox Jewish institutions and individuals who would not comply with their demands.

== Name ==
The name Sikrikim comes from sicarii, a group of Jewish Zealots who attacked Romans and their Jewish sympathizers during the Roman occupation of Judea using concealed daggers, sicae in Latin.

== History ==
The Sikrikim began to appear in Haredi neighborhoods in 2005. In Meah Shearim they are called the "Mafia of Mea Shearim" by some residents of the neighborhood. They are considered to be loosely affiliated with the Neturei Karta.

== Incidents ==
=== Use of Holocaust symbolism ===
On 31 December 2011, several hundred Haredim demonstrated in Jerusalem's Kikar HaShabbat (Sabbath Square), protesting against what they call "the exclusion of Haredim" from society. They specifically accused the "secular media" of bias in their coverage of both violent and non-violent acts of protest by Haredim with regard to allegedly immodestly clad women in public. They made use of Holocaust imagery, with some of the protesters wearing yellow badges, while others, including children, dressed in concentration camp uniforms, claiming by way of analogy that they are being persecuted in Israel by the secular majority. At the same time, the protesters expressed their solidarity with Shmuel Weissfish, a leading Sikrikim activist sentenced to two years' imprisonment for rioting, extortion, assault and grievous bodily harm, whose sentence was slated to begin on 1 January 2012. The use of Holocaust symbols at the demonstration made headlines in the international media, and was condemned by Israeli politicians.

=== Orot Banot Girls School ===
In September 2011, the Religious Zionist Orot Banot Girls School opened in Ramat Bet Shemesh. Many Haredim opposed the school's location and position on religion. Groups of Haredi men believed to be Sikrikim regularly stood outside the school on school days and taunted the students, throwing eggs and rocks at them while claiming that the girls were immodestly dressed. The incidents attracted wide attention in Israel and became an international news story after an Israeli television channel reported about harassments against one of the girls.

=== Zisalek ice cream parlour ===
In October 2011, the Sikrikim vandalised a store selling ice cream in a Haredi neighborhood in Jerusalem. The store had set up signs asking men and women to be seated separately, and not to eat in public. The Sikrikim asserted that licking ice-cream cones was "immodest". They broke in one night and vandalised the store.

=== Or HaChaim bookstore ===
The Or HaChaim Bookstore in Meah Shearim, or "Manny's" as it is known in the neighborhood, was targeted in a series of vandalism incidents in which the Sikrikim took credit via posters hung outside the store. The posters opposed the bookstore's selling of "Zionist" material. The store's windows were smashed several times, and members of the group put glue in the store's locks and dumped bags of human excrement inside the store.

=== Rivalry with the Gerrer Hasidim ===
The Or HaChaim Center belongs to a chain of stores partly owned by Yaakov Bibla and Yaakov Litzman, both Gerrer Hasidim, with whom the Sikrikim have an ongoing rivalry in Jerusalem. Gerrer Hasidim from the Batei Warsaw neighborhood near Meah Shearim reported widespread harassment that had almost escalated into a street war, with people from Ger attacking Sikrikim out of vengeance. The underlying issue seemed to be the large involvement and support that the Ger give to the state and government of Israel.

== Response ==
The group has been denounced by several members of the Knesset, including National Union Knesset Member Yaakov Katz, who called them "terrorists". When asked to comment or condemn them, Ramat Beit Shemesh Haredi rabbi Chaim Malinowitz refused, saying that by issuing a public condemnation it would make it look as if they are connected, when "No man in his sane mind wouldn't condemn this, just like you wouldn't ask me to condemn Madoff".

The group and its supporters were criticised by a number of Israeli politicians for using Holocaust symbolism (including yellow badges and concentration camp uniforms) to call attention to what they call the exclusion of Haredim from Israeli society.

Shas' spiritual leader Ovadia Yosef criticised the Sikrikim, saying that they "discredit the Torah".

== Arrests and trials ==
In January 2011, Shmuel Weissfish, a leading activist of the Sikrikim, and one of the assailants of the Space electronics store owner in Geula was sentenced to two years imprisonment for rioting, extortion, assault and grievous bodily harm by the Jerusalem District Court. The sentence was upheld by the Supreme Court in November of the same year. Hundreds of Haredim protested against his condemnation.

In September 2011, one of the heads of the Sikrikim considered responsible for harassing and vandalizing the Ohr HaChaim Bookstore was arrested by the police.

In November 2011, Yosef Meir Hazan, a member of the Sikrikim, was arrested in the Geula neighborhood by the Jerusalem Police on suspicion of causing public disturbances, damaging property and assaulting a police officer attempting to arrest him. In a video posted to YouTube, he is shown directing various demonstrations and violent activities against the Ohr HaChaim Bookstore in Meah Shearim and the Batei Warsaw complex in Geula, the focus of a violent struggle between the Sikrikim and the neighborhood's Ger Hasidim. He was indicted and charged with one count of aggravated assault, one count of aggravated assault against a police officer, and rioting. The 21-year-old Hazan was released to house arrest at his aunt's residence, and was placed under the supervision of his aunt, his mother, and a rabbi.

== See also ==
- Judaism and violence
- Hilltop Youth
- Jewish fundamentalism
