= Yisroel Dovid Weiss =

Jewish American anti-Zionist activist (born 1952)

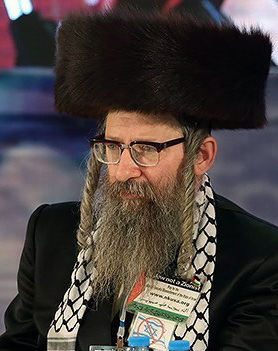
- Weiss in 2018
- Born: 1952 (age 73–74); United States
- Known for: Activist and spokesman for a branch of Neturei Karta

Yisroel Dovid Weiss (Yiddish: ישראל דוד ווייס; born 1952) is an American anti-Zionist activist, rabbi, and spokesman for the worldwide religious group Neturei Karta. Residing in Monsey, New York, he believes that Jews should peacefully oppose the existence of the Israeli state: "It would be forbidden for us to have a State, even if it would be in a land that is desolate and uninhabited." He advocates a complete return of land to Palestinians, rejecting the 1967 borders and advocating coexistence. He believes that the restoration of the Land of Israel to the Jews should only happen with the coming of the Messiah, and not by self-determination.

In 2006, Weiss was widely criticized for attending the International Conference to Review the Global Vision of the Holocaust, which promotes Holocaust revisionism, including denial. Co-speakers included David Duke and convicted Holocaust deniers. Weiss, who himself lost most of his family in the Holocaust, stated that he acknowledges the Holocaust's historical reality but criticizes Israelis for exploiting it, asserting that many Jews oppose Zionism.

== Biography ==
Weiss grew up in Borough Park, Brooklyn, New York City. His mother was originally from Poland. His father's family was from Hungary. Most of his family was killed during the Holocaust.

=== Anti-Zionist campaigning ===
Weiss speaks at rallies and conferences in the United States and internationally, criticizing Israel and Zionism. In 2001, he attended the UN-organized World Conference against Racism in Durban, South Africa, as part of the Islamic Human Rights Commission delegation. During the conference, US and Israeli delegates walked out in protest of singling out of Israel.

In November 2006, Weiss stated at a protest in New York City that, "Zionism is a fundamentally heretical movement which denies the Divine imperative that Jews remain in exile until the day when all mankind will be miraculously redeemed". He repeated his claim at a 2011 conference in London, calling for Israel to be "dismantled" and saying the country is a "Zionist state that has kidnapped the name of Judaism". At a conference organized by the Islamist Hezbollah in Beirut on March 13, 2018, Weiss presented a "symbolic gift" to be passed to Hassan Nasrallah, the leader of the organization.

==== Visit to Iran, and stance on Mahmoud Ahmadinejad ====
In December 2006, as part of a six-member delegation from the small fringe group Neturei Karta, Weiss spoke at the International Conference to Review the Global Vision of the Holocaust, held by the Iranian government in Tehran. It was described by media sources such as NPR and London's Jewish Chronicle as a gathering of Holocaust deniers. In his five-minute speech, Weiss addressed the issue of Holocaust denial:

Now, maybe I can say that at the discussion of the Holocaust, I may be the representative, the voice of the people who died in the Holocaust because my grandparents died there. They were killed in Auschwitz. My parents were from Hungary. My father escaped, and his parents remained. He wasn't able to get them out of Hungary, and they died in Auschwitz, as were other relatives and all the communities that they knew. So, to say that they didn't die, to me, you cannot say that. I am the living remnant of the people who died in the Holocaust, and I am here, I believe sent by God, to humbly say, simply to speak to the people here and say, 'You should know that the Jewish people died, and do not try to say that it did not happen. They did die!' There are people throughout the Jewish communities, still alive in their seventies and eighties, and every one of them will tell you their stories. It is something which you cannot refute, but that being said, it doesn't mean that the Holocaust is a tool to use to oppress other people.

Weiss stated that though Israelis have used the Holocaust to gain sympathy and advantage, he does not believe the Holocaust toll is exaggerated. Weiss said that "The Zionists use the Holocaust issue to their benefit. We, Jews who perished in the Holocaust, do not use it to advance our interests. We stress that there are hundreds of thousands [of] Jews around the world who identify with our opposition to the Zionist ideology, and who feel that Zionism is not Jewish, but a political agenda... What we want is not a withdrawal to the '67 borders, but to everything included in it, so the country can go back to the Palestinians, and we could live with them."

Weiss defended Iranian President Mahmoud Ahmadinejad against accusations of anti-Semitism. In March 2006, during a visit to Iran, Weiss released a statement to Iran's official IRIB radio in which he stated that: "It is dangerous deviation to pretend that the Iranian president is anti-Jewish and anti-Semitic. He is extremely friendly, and he understands the difference between the Zionists and the Jews who do not embrace the state of Israel." The statement added that they were "upset about the recent ploys, propaganda, and tensions which have been created by the West regarding the statements of the Iranian president Mahmoud Ahmadinejad about a world free of Zionism, since this is nothing more than wishing for a better world, dominated by peace and calm."

American Jewish organisations, including Agudath Israel of America and the Orthodox Union, issued statements distancing themselves from Weiss. The executive vice president of the Orthodox Union, Rabbi Tzvi Hersh Weinreb, has called the group "embarrassing", and Rabbi Avi Shafran, spokesman for Agudath Israel of America, called Neturei Karta's public display of affection for Mahmoud Ahmadinejad "graphic and disgusting".

After returning to the U.S. from the conference, Weiss and other individuals who attended were ostracized by synagogues, denied service at kosher stores, and subjected to disparagement in some communities with strong Haredi populations, such as Brooklyn and Monsey. A demonstration outside a Neturei Karta synagogue on January 7, 2007, was met by a counter-demonstration attended by "a much smaller contingent" of supporters of Rabbi Weiss.

==== Weiss's activities during the 2023 Israel–Hamas conflict ====
Following the October 2023 Israeli invasion of the Gaza Strip in response to the October 7 attacks, Weiss and his Neturei Karta colleagues have been active in advocating for Palestinians in Gaza, speaking on various media and joining in marches and demonstrations such as a pro-Palestinian march in New York City on 17 November 2023. In early December 2023 Weiss and his Neturei Karta contingent journeyed to South Africa to attend the Fifth Global Convention of Solidarity with Palestine, a convention which received criticism because of the attendance of Hamas representatives. On 12 February 2025, Weiss was harassed by supporters from the Zionist organization, Betar.

==== Weiss's reaction to critics ====
Weiss asserted that the Jewish world had misunderstood the actions of Neturei Karta. He said the organization did not appear at the conference to deny the Holocaust, but to draw a distinction between Zionists and Jews. Weiss stated that he believed Ahmadinejad is not an enemy of the Jews, but is a "God-fearing man [who] respects the Jewish people, and he protects them in Iran".

== See also ==
- Moshe Ber Beck
- Israeli–Palestinian conflict
- Haredim and Zionism
- Criticism of Israel
