= Mea Shearim =

Haredi Jewish neighbourhood in Jerusalem

Mea Shearim מאה שערים (Yiddish) מֵאָה שְׁעָרִים (Hebrew)
- Neighborhood
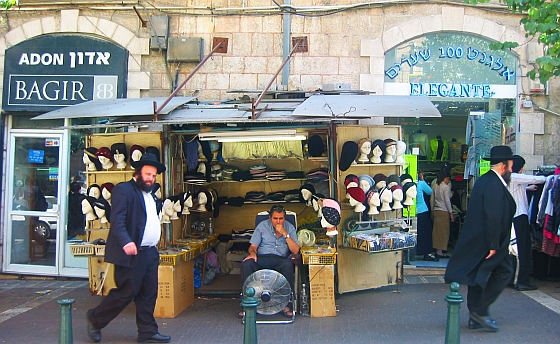

- Location in Jerusalem
- Administered by: Israel
- Israeli District: Jerusalem District
- Israeli Municipality: Jerusalem
- Founded: 1874

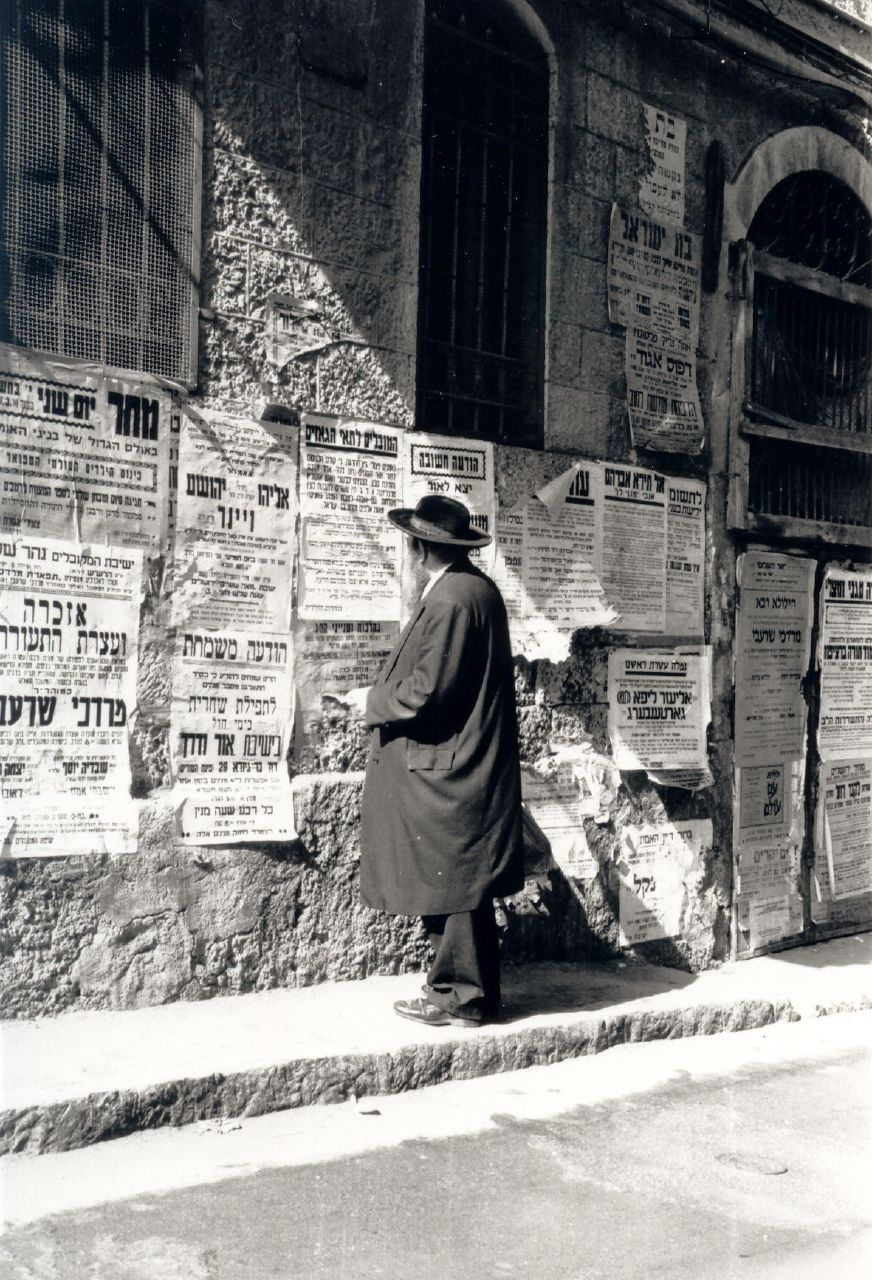
A wall plastered with pashkevilin (announcements) in Mea Shearim

Mea Shearim (Note: Yiddish: מאה שערים, pronounced [ˈmɛɪ̯ə ˈʃɔrɪm]; Hebrew: מֵאָה שְׁעָרִים, lit. 'hundred gates', Ashkenazi pronunciation: [ˈme.ə ˈʃɔː.ʀɪm], contextually, 'a hundred fold') is a neighborhood in Jerusalem. It is one of the oldest Ashkenazi neighborhoods in Jerusalem outside of the Old City. It is populated by Ashkenazi Haredi Jews, and was built by members of the Old Yishuv.

== Name ==
The name Mea Shearim is derived from a verse in Genesis, which happened to be part of the weekly Torah portion that was read the week the settlement was founded: "Isaac sowed in that land, and in that year, he reaped a hundredfold (מאה שערים, mea shearim); God had blessed him" (Genesis 26:12). According to a tradition, the community originally had 100 gates, another meaning of Mea Shearim.

== History ==
Meir Auerbach, the chief Ashkenazi rabbi of Jerusalem, was one of the founders of the neighborhood. Conrad Schick, a German Protestant architect, drew up the first blueprint for Mea Shearim in 1846. Mea Shearim, one of the earliest Jewish settlements outside the walls of the Old City, was established in 1874 by a building society of 100 shareholders. Pooling their resources, the society members purchased a tract of land outside the walled city, which was severely over-crowded and plagued by poor sanitation, and built a new neighborhood with the goal of improving their standard of living.

Yosef Rivlin, one of the heads of the Jewish community in Jerusalem, and a Christian Arab from Bethlehem were the contractors. The work was carried out by both Jewish and non-Jewish workers.

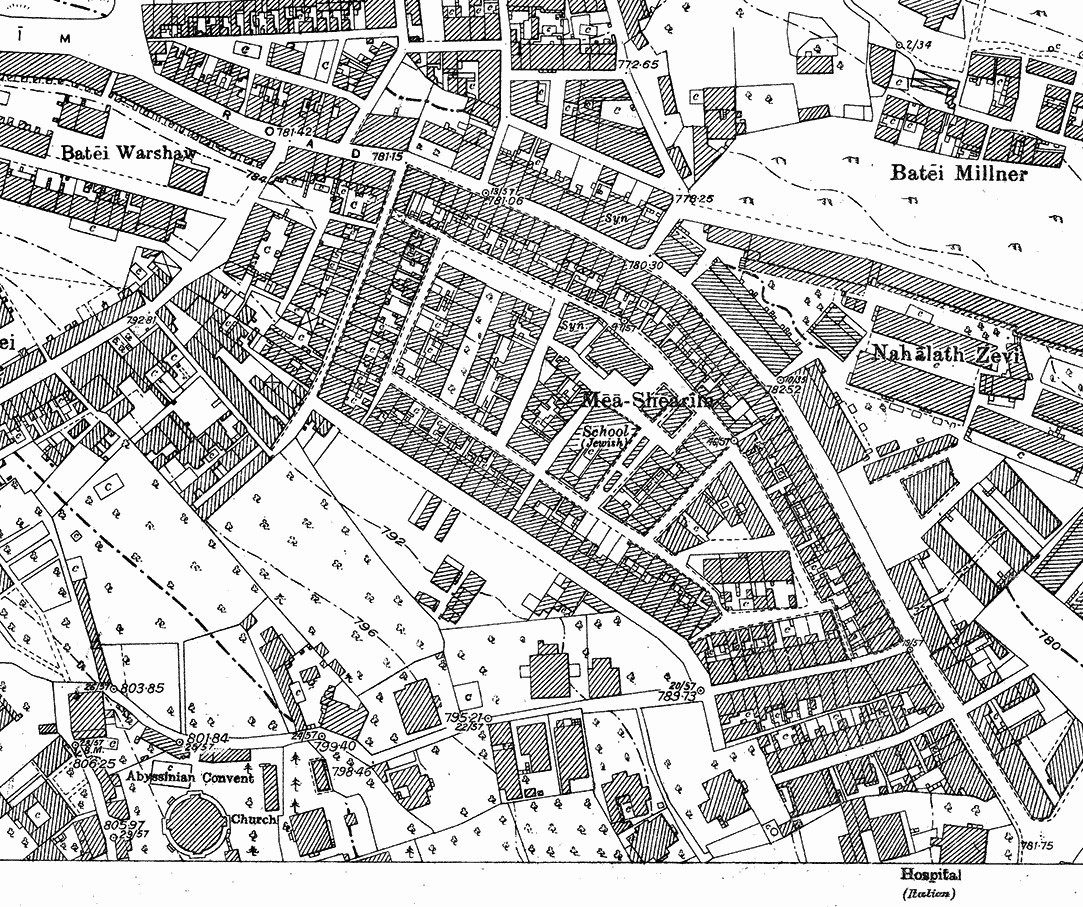
Street plan in 1927

Mea Shearim was structured as a courtyard neighborhood. It was surrounded by a wall, with gates that were locked every evening. By October 1880, 100 apartments were ready for occupancy, and a lottery was held to assign them to families. By the turn of the century, there were 300 houses, a flour mill, and a bakery. Conrad Schick planned for open green space in each courtyard, but cowsheds were built instead. Mea Shearim was the first quarter in Jerusalem to have street lights.

== Haredi lifestyle ==
Today, Mea Shearim remains an insular neighbourhood in the heart of Jerusalem. With its Haredi, and overwhelmingly Hasidic, population, the streets retain the characteristics of a pre-war Eastern European shtetl. Life revolves around strict adherence to Jewish law, prayer, and the study of Jewish religious texts. Traditions in dress include black frock coats and black hats for men (although there are some other clothing styles, depending on the religious sub-group to which they belong), and long-sleeved, modest clothing for women. In some Hasidic groups, the women wear thick black stockings all year long, even in summer. Married women wear a variety of hair coverings, from wigs to scarves, snoods, hats, and berets. The men have beards, and many grow long sidecurls, called peyos. Many residents speak Yiddish in their daily lives, and use Hebrew only for prayer and religious study, as they believe Hebrew to be a sacred language, only to be used for religious purposes.

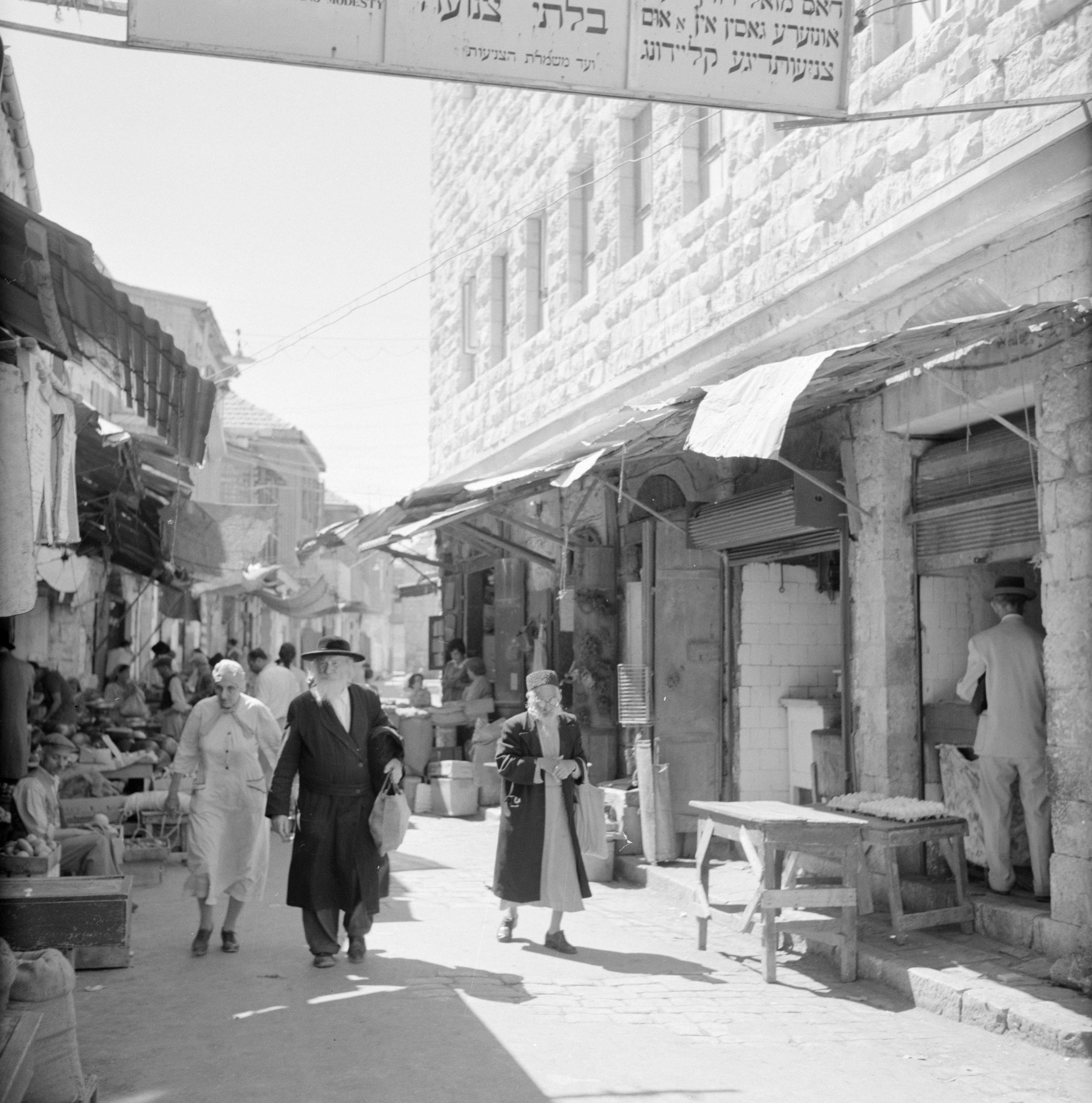
The Mea Shearim shuk in the 1960s.

Hasidic groups with a large number of followers in Mea Shearim include: Breslov, Slonim, Toldos Aharon, Toldos Avraham Yitzhak, Mishkenos HoRoim, and Satmar. The Pinsk-Karlin dynasty also has its center here. The Edah HaChareidis, which supervises kashrut certification and runs a Jewish religious court, has its headquarters at the western end of Mea Shearim. Mea Shearim is the stronghold of both factions of the Neturei Karta movement, which opposes Zionism, as well as the movement from whence they sprang – the descendants of the original Perushim community, also known as "Yerushalmis". Some Neturei Karta members have asked to live under Arab rule. Rabbi Yosef Shalom Eliashiv, a posek of Litvish / Yeshivish Jewry, lived there.

The oldest Sephardic Haredi dynasty, Levi Kahana of Spain, has a religious cultural center in the neighborhood.

== Neighborhood regulations ==
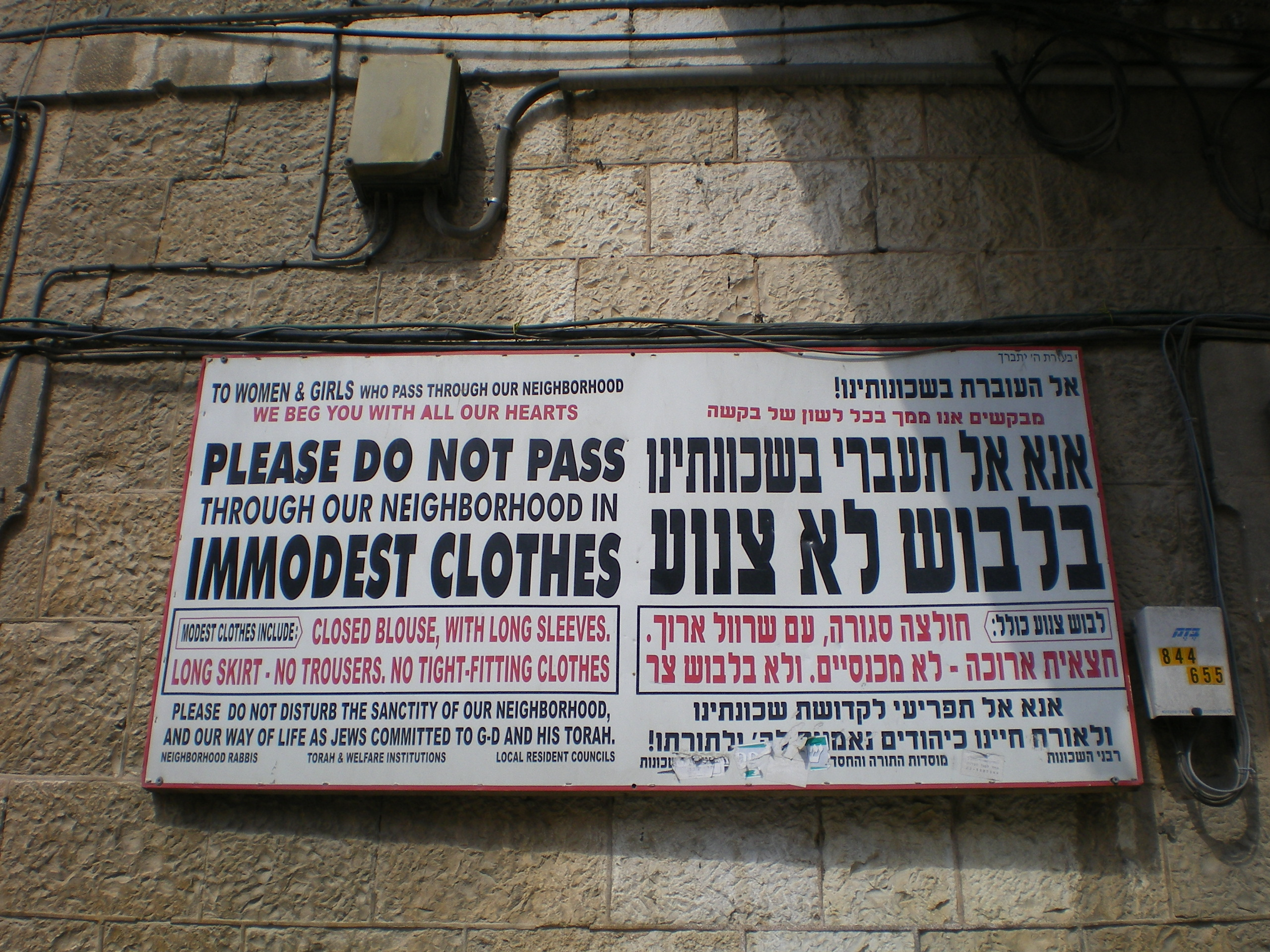
Modesty sign in Mea Shearim

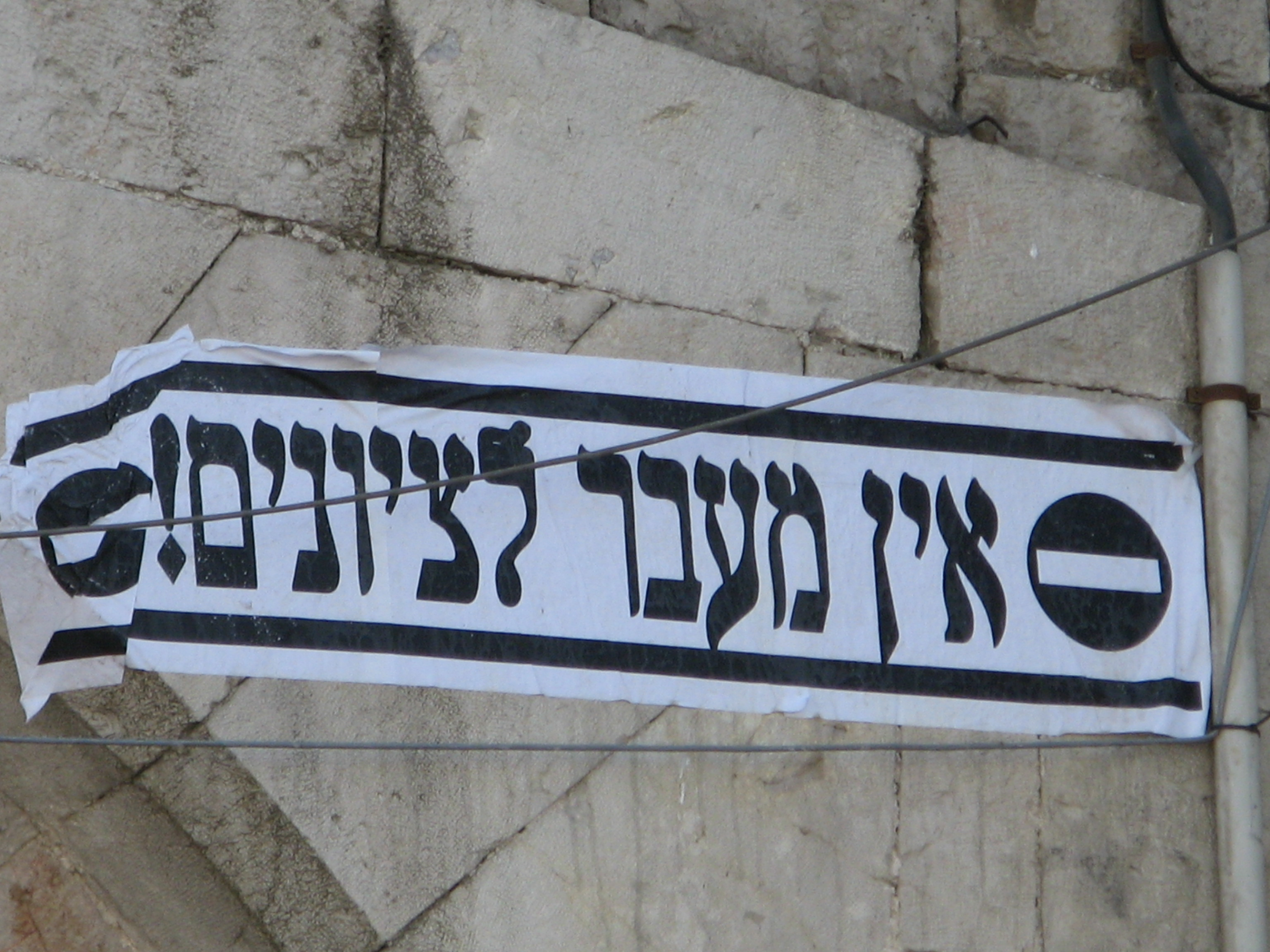
Flyer in Meah Shearim that reads: "No entry to Zionists!"

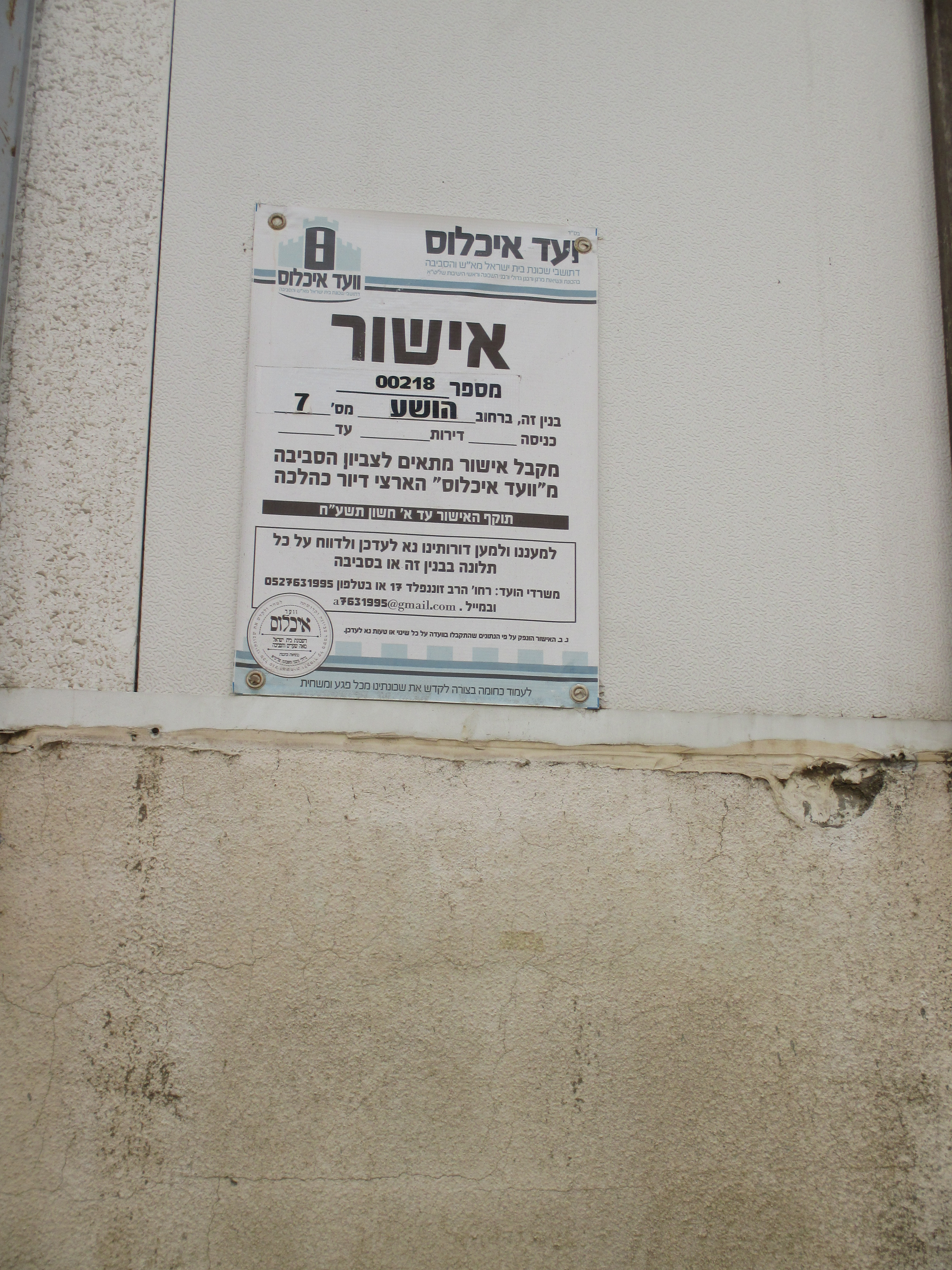
A certificate for a building in the neighborhood, confirming that its residents have been inspected and found suitable for the neighborhood's character

"Modesty" posters in Hebrew and English are hung at every entrance to Mea Shearim. When visiting the neighborhood, women and girls are urged to wear what is deemed to be modest dress (knee-length skirts or longer, no plunging necklines or midriff tops, no sleeveless or short-sleeved blouses or bare shoulders); men and boys are urged to avoid wearing shorts and sleeveless shirts; tourists are requested not to arrive in large, conspicuous groups; and in some of the older signs, even non-Jewish men are requested to wear kippot. During Shabbat (from Friday night at sundown to Saturday night at sundown), visitors are asked to refrain from smoking, photography, driving, or using mobile phones. When entering synagogues, men are asked to cover their heads.

=== Incidents in the neighborhood ===
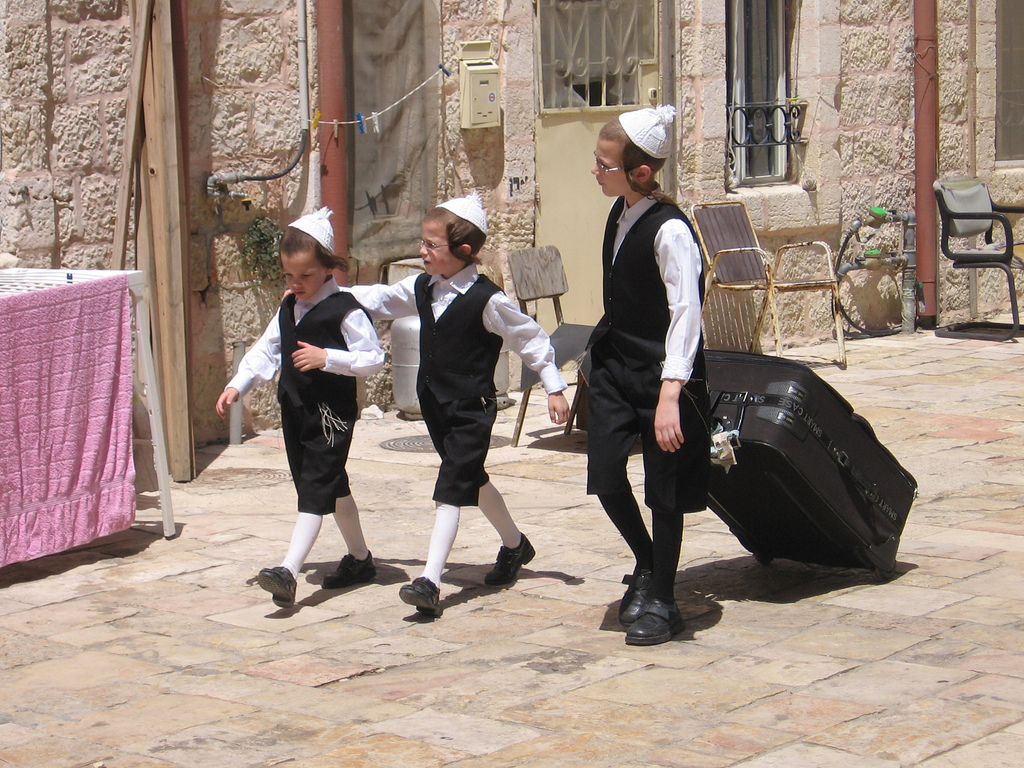
Toldos Aharon children in Mea Shearim, 2007

Some residents have been criticized for attacking police, and other government officials entering the area, with stones, and blocking the streets, or setting fire to rubbish when they try to do so (otherwise known as Hafganahs).

A small, violent group called the Sikrikim, of less than 100 families, enforce censorship on bookshops, causing over ₪250,000 damage to a shop that resisted their demands.

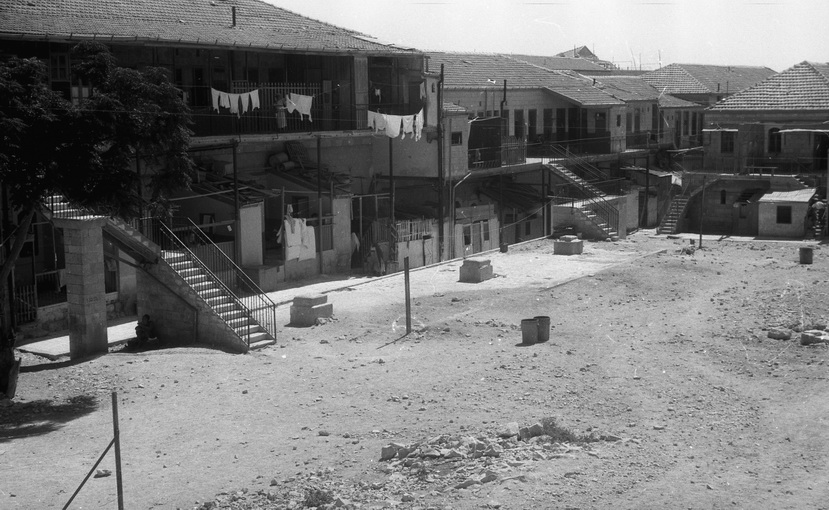
A Meah Shearim courtyard in the 1940s

On 24 June 2010, politicians Uri Maklev and Moshe Gafni of the Haredi party United Torah Judaism were attacked in Mea Shearim, after they had visited the Slonim rabbi and had entered his synagogue to pray. When they emerged, they were set upon by young men affiliated with Neturei Karta who spat at them and physically assaulted them.

In April 2015, an IDF officer was attacked by men and women of Mea Shearim who allegedly threatened to kill him, while children blocked his exit. The incident received national attention. The attack was condemned by Prime Minister Benjamin Netanyahu as "outrageous", and by Shas leader Aryeh Deri as "an act of terror".

== See also ==
- Batei Warsaw
- Meah Shearim Yeshiva and Talmud Torah
- Expansion of Jerusalem in the 19th century
