= Abraham Rabinovich =

American historian

Abraham Rabinovich (Hebrew: אברהם רבינוביץ') is a historian and journalist who has published several books on recent Jewish history. As a reporter, his work has appeared in The Wall Street Journal, The New York Times, the International Herald Tribune, The New Republic, and The Christian Science Monitor. Before becoming a writer full-time, he was employed as a staff journalist for Newsday and The Jerusalem Post. He is a graduate of Brooklyn College and a veteran of the United States Army. He is the cousin of the late Moshe Hirsch.

His published works include:

- The Yom Kippur War: The Epic Encounter That Transformed the Middle East. Schocken Books, 2004. ISBN 0-8052-4176-0
- The Boats of Cherbourg. Naval Institute Press, 1997. ISBN 1-55750-714-7
- Teddy Kollek: Builder of Jerusalem. Jewish Publication Society, 1996. ISBN 0-8276-0561-7
- Jerusalem on Earth: People, Passions, and Politics in the Holy City. Free Press, 1988. ISBN 0-02-925740-9
- Jerusalem, the measure of the year. Carta, 1985. ISBN 965-220-081-6
- The Battle for Jerusalem, June 5–7, 1967. Jewish Publication Society, 1972. ISBN 0-8276-0285-5
