= HaChoma =

Israeli newspaper

HaChoma - collection of articles from the people of Neturei Karta החומה, ילקוט מאמרים מאנשי נטורי קרתא
- Founder: Neturei Karta
- Founded: 1944
- Language: Hebrew
- Headquarters: Jerusalem

HaChoma - collection of articles from the people of Neturei Karta (Hebrew: החומה, ילקוט מאמרים מאנשי נטורי קרתא, or for short: HaChoma, the Wall) is the official newspaper of Neturei Karta Haredi Jewish group. The newspaper is released intermittently in Jerusalem several times a year since 1944.

The first paper was published in 1944. Between 1949 and 1953, the papers were published under the title "אם אני חומה" (the nation 'I am a wall'); from 1953 to 1954, it was renamed "משמרת חמותנו" (the watch of our walls); and in 1954, it appeared under the title "משמרת השומר" (the watch of our guardian).

As of 2012, the editor of the newspaper is Rabbi Avraham Yaakov Epstein. Contributors include writers affiliated with "Neturei Karta" and their associates, such as Amram Halevi, Yitzhak Beharan, M. Sheesh, Ish Yerushalayim (a pen name), A. Leibavich, Y. Lang, and Y. Erich. Each issue typically consists of 24 pages.

== Content ==
The newspaper covers a variety of topics from the perspective of its publishers. Among the main issues are:

- The newspaper addresses the controversy surrounding the funding of Talmud Torahs and yeshivot by the State of Israel. Neturei Karta sharply opposes the involvement of the state and frequently criticizes Agudat Yisrael party and its affiliates for their stance on this matter.
- The newspaper condemns archaeological excavations conducted in areas believed to contain graves, derogatorily referring to them as "Chitutei Shakhvi" (חיטוטי שכבי), which means "digging up graves" in Aramaic.
