= Wall newspaper =

Communication format

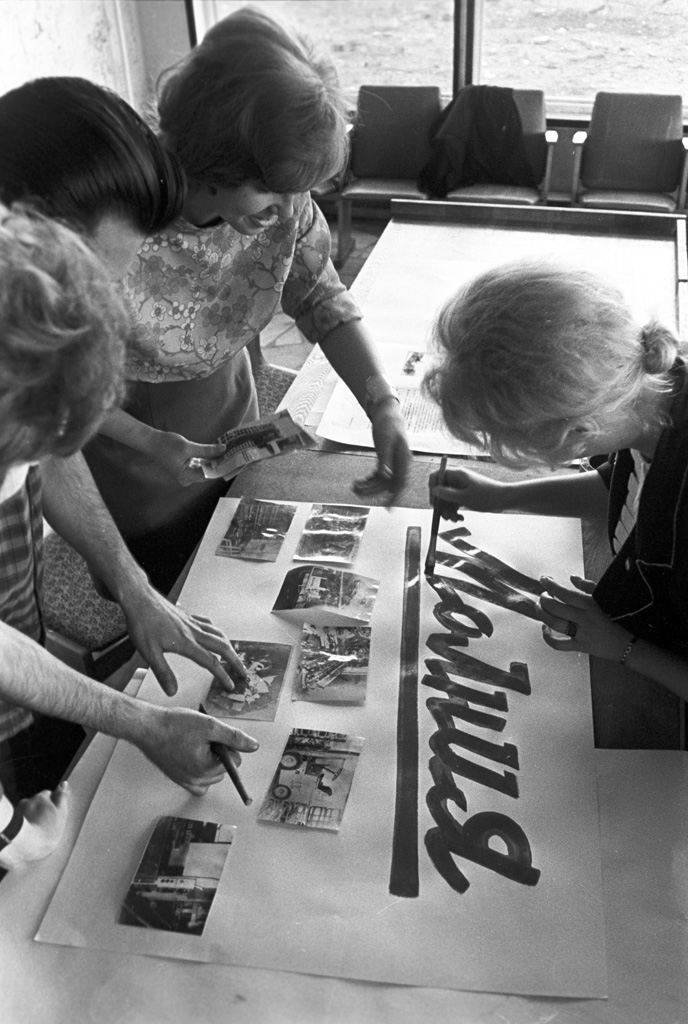
AZLK employees in the process of creation of the plant's wall newspaper

A wall newspaper or placard newspaper is a hand-lettered or printed newspaper designed to be displayed and read in public places both indoors and outdoors, utilizing vertical surfaces such as walls, boards, and fences.

== Usage in Communist states ==
=== Soviet Russia and Soviet Union ===
During the Russian Revolution of 1917 and the Russian Civil War, which followed, the use of wall newspapers came into vogue in Soviet Russia. These so-called "placard newspapers" are said to have begun due to a chronic shortage of newsprint paper resulting from war conditions, blockade, and economic dislocation. The papers were first used in military barracks as a means of disseminating official government information, but their use was soon common in factories, schools, and other locations where large numbers of people congregated.

These wall poster newspapers soon came to be seen as efficient vehicles for publicity and propaganda in a factory setting even after the end of the newsprint shortage, as one early account noted:

It is by no means the ambition of the placard newspaper to supplant the printed periodical. Its object is rather to throw light on such questions as cannot be treated in the columns of the general newspapers, for lack of space. ... Each labor community ... has found it advisable to encourage a public discussion of the current problems of its specific production, and to induce all its workers, even the most backward, to take part in this discussion. The placard newspaper is particularly devoted to these specific interests of each industry.

Early Soviet wall newspapers were frequently produced by an editorial board of 3–5 people, who frequently made use of the news reports of so-called "worker-correspondents".

Wall poster newspapers were also used in small or remote villages in Soviet Russia, in which no other news source was available. These village wall papers sought to build literacy among a largely illiterate population and to inculcate pro-regime values among the rural population.

=== East Germany ===
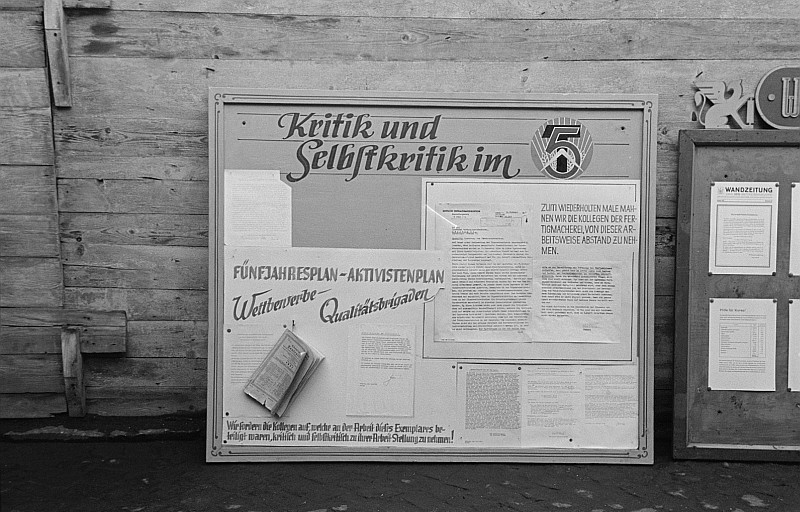
East German factory wall newspaper making use of the behavioral control mechanism of "criticism and self-criticism" (Leipzig, 1951)

Wall newspapers were frequently used in factories of Communist East Germany during the second half of the 20th century as a mechanism for publicity and propaganda. The form of these publications was at times more akin to a bulletin board than a formal newspaper.

=== China ===
Under the reign of Mao Zedong, wall newspapers were "forward and full of pathos-filled propaganda about current events" and the "large victories for our grand nation", according to Qiu Xiaolong.

== See also ==
- Big-character poster
- Kōsatsu
- Pashkevil
- Wochenspruch der NSDAP
