= Neturei Karta =

Haredi Jewish anti-Zionist organization

- נָטוֹרֵי קַרְתָּא
- Formation: 1938; 88 years ago
- Founded at: Jerusalem, British Mandate for Palestine
- Legal status: INGO
- Purpose: Anti-Zionism
- Headquarters: Jerusalem (Mea Shearim)
- Origins: World Agudath Israel
- Region served: Worldwide
- Products: HaChoma
- Members: Thousands (March 2024)
- Official language: Yiddish, Hebrew, English, Aramaic
- Spokesman: Yisroel Dovid Weiss
- Key people: Moshe Ber Beck (d. 2021)
- Affiliations: Haredi Judaism
- Website: nkusa.org

Neturei Karta (Aramaic: נָטוֹרֵי קַרְתָּא, romanized: Nāṭōrē Qartāʾ, lit. 'Guardians of the City') is a Jewish anti-Zionist organization that was founded in Jerusalem in 1938 and is primarily active in parts of Israel and the Western world. It was established by Haredi Jews originally affiliated with World Agudath Israel, which represented the most devout members of the Haredi community of the Old Yishuv. The organization's members, who adhere to stringent interpretations of Jewish religious law, are known for their religious conservatism and insular lifestyles. Neturei Karta's international political activism is rooted in its opposition to Israel's existence, which, in turn, is rooted in its members' core religious belief that the Jewish exile is to be maintained until the coming of the Messiah.

Initially, World Agudath Israel largely disagreed with the secular orientation of political Zionism, believing that it did not place enough importance on Judaism and thus constituted a threat to Haredi communities globally. However, it eventually reneged to reach an understanding with Zionist aspirations in light of World War II and the Holocaust. The founders of Neturei Karta, Amram Blau and Aharon Katzenelbogen, disagreed with the Aguda's accommodationist stance and broke off from the movement.

Members of Neturei Karta believe that Israel's founding was an affront to God because it provided the means for an effectively secular undoing of the Jewish exile, while also being a Jewish state that does not absolutely govern by religious law. The organization believes that the Jewish people may only be restored to the Land of Israel by the Messiah, who will bring about the resurrection of the dead, the ingathering of the exiles, and a complete return to Torah law. As such, it does not recognize Israel and has pursued relationships with entities seeking to destroy Israel. With regard to the Israeli–Palestinian conflict, Neturei Karta endorses a form of the one-state solution in which the Palestinian people control the combined territory of Israel and the State of Palestine.

The views of Neturei Karta's members are considered fringe, even within Haredi Jewish circles. On numerous occasions, a number of anti-Zionist Orthodox Jewish movements have denounced Neturei Karta for its pursuit of relationships with the Iranian government, neo-Nazis, and Holocaust deniers, particularly after Neturei Karta members attended the 2006 International Conference to Review the Global Vision of the Holocaust, which was condemned by the United Nations and much of the international community.

== Etymology ==
The name Neturei Karta means "city guards" in Aramaic and is derived from an aggadta recorded in several texts of the Talmud, including the Jerusalem Talmud Hagigah 1:7 (page six in the standard Vilna edition). There, it is related that:

Judah the Prince sent rabbis (Note: In the Yerushalmi and Midrash Tehillim: Hiyya, Immi, and Assi. In Pesiqta deRav Kehana, Immi and Jose. In Eichah Rabbah, Immi and Assi. Meiri (to Shabbat 114a) recalls "one of their sages". Eliezer ben Joel HaLevi (Hagigah 10a) recalls "Hiyya and Jose".) to tour the cities of Israel and establish for them teachers and scribes. They came to one place and did not find a teacher or a scribe. They said, "Bring us the city guards," and the city watchmen were brought. (Note: In the Yerushalmi apparently corrupt: "Bring us the city guards, bring us the watchmen." Other versions (including the Arukh citation) are as presented. The word סנטרי "watchmen" is Lat. saltarii; see D. Sperber, "On Pubs and Policemen in Roman Palestine" p. 259, S. Lieberman to t. BM 9:14, and Sokoloff, p. 383-384.) They said, "These are the city ruiners, but those are the city guards." (Note: Here the Arukh appears to preserve the best text, which is presented. In the Yerushalmi and Midrash Tehillim, "These are the city guards!? These are nothing but city ruiners!" In the Pesiqta deRav Kehana and Eichah Rabbah, "These are city guards, these are the city ruiners.") And who were the city guards? The scribes and the teachers, who guard the Torah day and night. (Note: At this point each version cites a Biblical verse in support, including Ps. 127:1, Josh. 1:8, or both. The Zohar (Bo 6:143) has a different interpretation of this aggadta.)

The name thus reflects Neturei Karta's original mission to oppose efforts in the Old Yishuv to establish a Jewish armed force during the 1936–1939 Arab revolt, as the group believed that such a force would be destructive and that Torah scholars are the true guards of the Jewish people. Today, Neturei Karta members generally understand the name to mean that they defend their interpretation of Jewish religious law against that of other rabbis, namely those who do not oppose modern Israel's existence.

== History ==
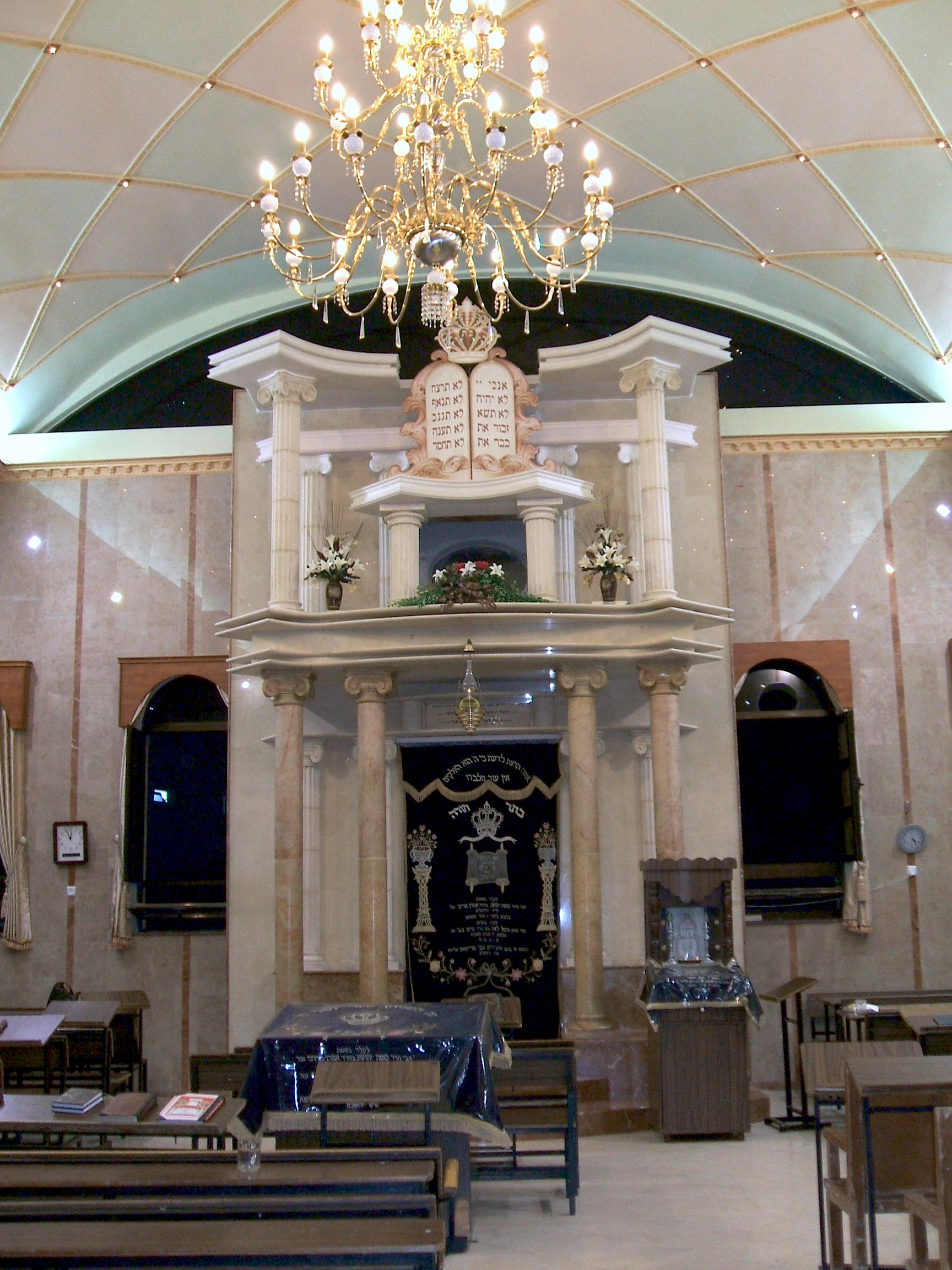
Neturei Karta synagogue and study hall in Jerusalem

=== Before modern Israel ===
In the Old Yishuv under the Ottoman Empire, the religious Jewish communities primarily concentrated in the Jewish holy cities of Jerusalem, Safed, Hebron, and Tiberias largely eschewed the secular orientation of political Zionism, which they saw as a potential threat to their way of life. They resented the new arrivals, who were predominantly non-religious, while they asserted that Jewish redemption could be brought about only by the Jewish messiah.

In 1921, some of the most devout of the Ashkenazi Old Yishuv formed the Haredi Council of Jerusalem as a counterpoint to the Chief Rabbinate, created by the British Mandatory Palestine government. The Haredi saw the rabbinate as a capitulation to the secular Zionists and their nationalist aspirations.

The Aguda movement represented by the Haredi Council opposed the formation of a Jewish political state in the Land of Israel and discouraged its European members from immigrating to Palestine. However, in the 1930s, the movement adopted a more compromising and accommodationist approach to the Zionist movement in response to rising antisemitism in Europe. Aguda's leniency was too much for Rabbi Amram Blau, active in Aguda's Jerusalem chapter. Along with Rabbi Aharon Katzenelbogen, Blau split with the Aguda in 1937 and co-founded Chevrat HaChayim, quickly renamed Neturei Karta.

=== Since Israeli independence ===
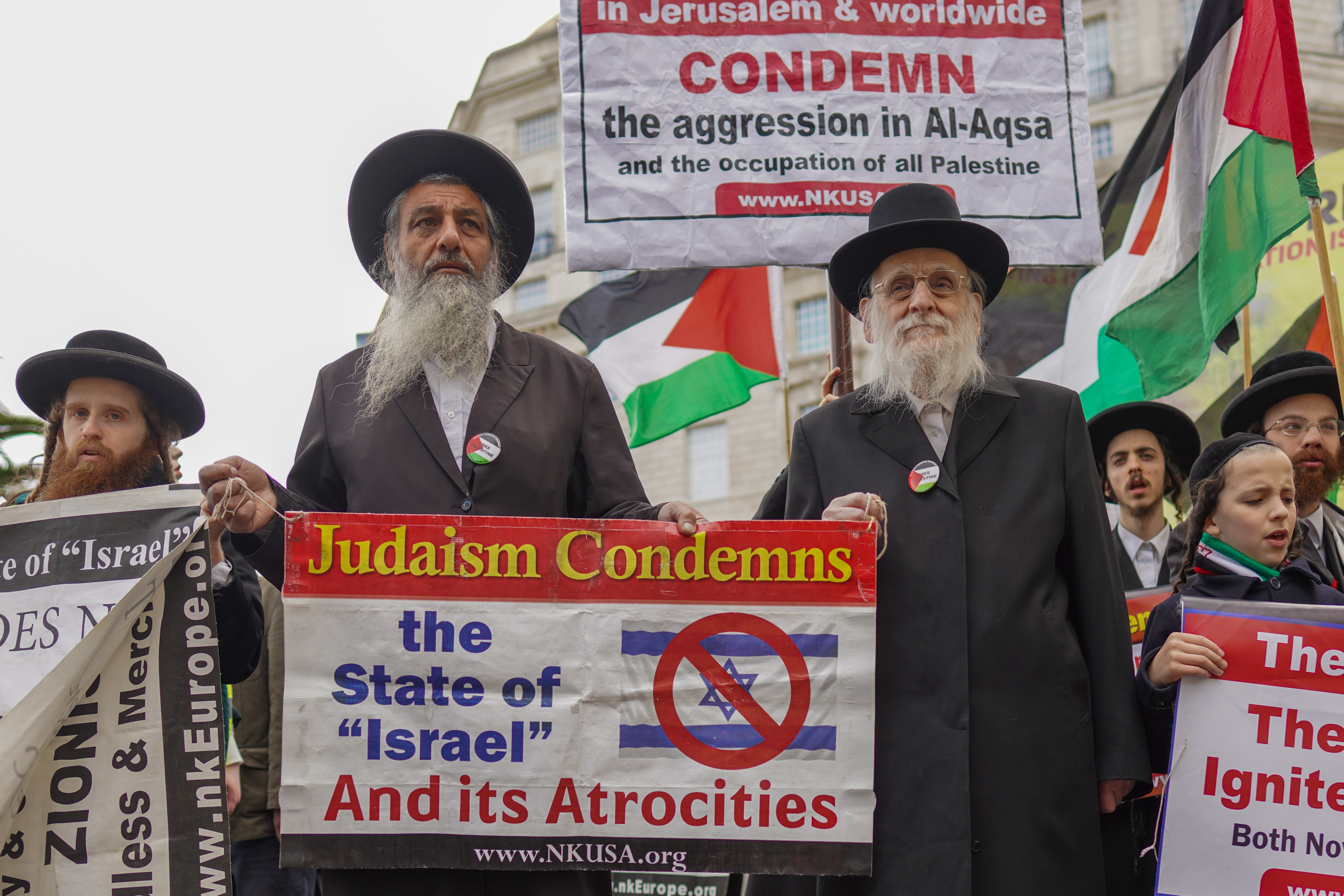
Members of Neturei Karta holding Palestinian flags and placards saying that "Judaism condemns the state of Israel and its atrocities" in London, 2022

After the creation of the modern State of Israel in 1948, Neturei Karta refused to recognize the Israeli government or any of its institutions. The group began holding public protests that often turned violent over what they perceived as the secularization of Jerusalem, the violation of Shabbat in ultra-Orthodox neighborhoods, and public gender mixing.

After the Six-Day War, Neturei Karta began cultivating friendly relationships in the Arab world. In 1969, the group protested Israel outside the United Nations, then in 1970 held a similar protest with the new Palestine Liberation Organization (PLO). Neturei Karta leader Moshe Hirsch befriended PLO leader Yasir Arafat, who many Israelis viewed as their major enemy. Arafat appointed Hirsch to the symbolic position of Jewish affairs minister, receiving a $30,000 monthly salary. Two Neturei Karta members participated in a 2004 prayer vigil for Arafat outside the Percy Military Hospital in Paris, France, where he lay on his death bed, an act widely condemned by other Orthodox Jewish organizations, including many other anti-Zionist Haredi organizations, both in New York and Jerusalem. Hirsch attended Arafat's funeral in Ramallah.

Following the Hamas incursion into southern Israel on October 7, 2023, and the subsequent Israeli offensive in Gaza, Yisroel Dovid Weiss, the Neturei Karta spokesman, and his colleagues have been active in advocating for Palestinians in Gaza.

In February 2024, several members of Neturei Karta joined a protest in New York City where a Wall Street statue was vandalized with "Death to Israel” and “Free Palestine.” That September, Neturei Karta rabbis were present at an interfaith meeting in the city with Iran's President Masoud Pezeshkian during General Assembly of the United Nations.

== Members ==
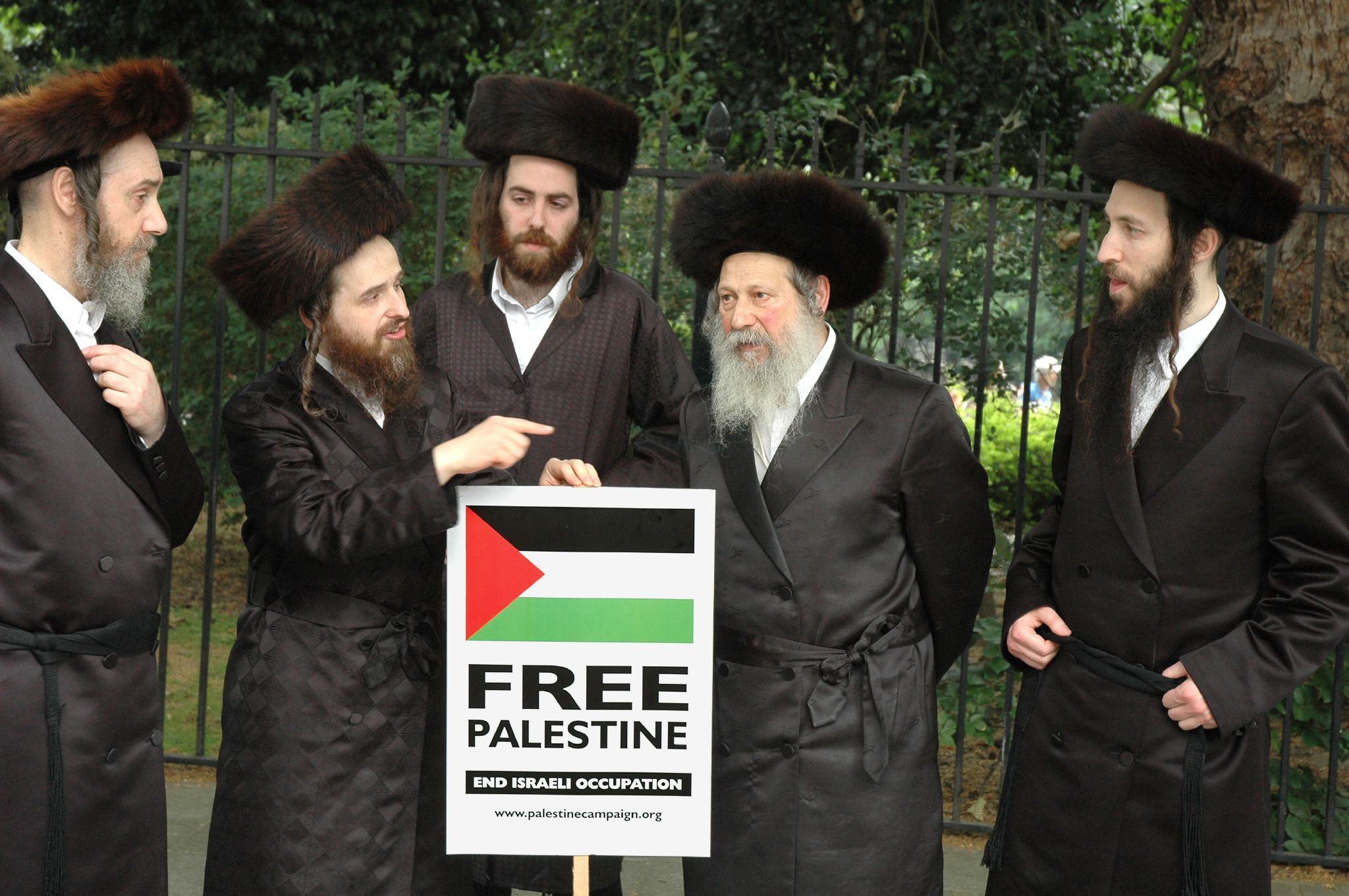
Members of Neturei Karta at a pro-Palestinian rally in the United Kingdom, 2005

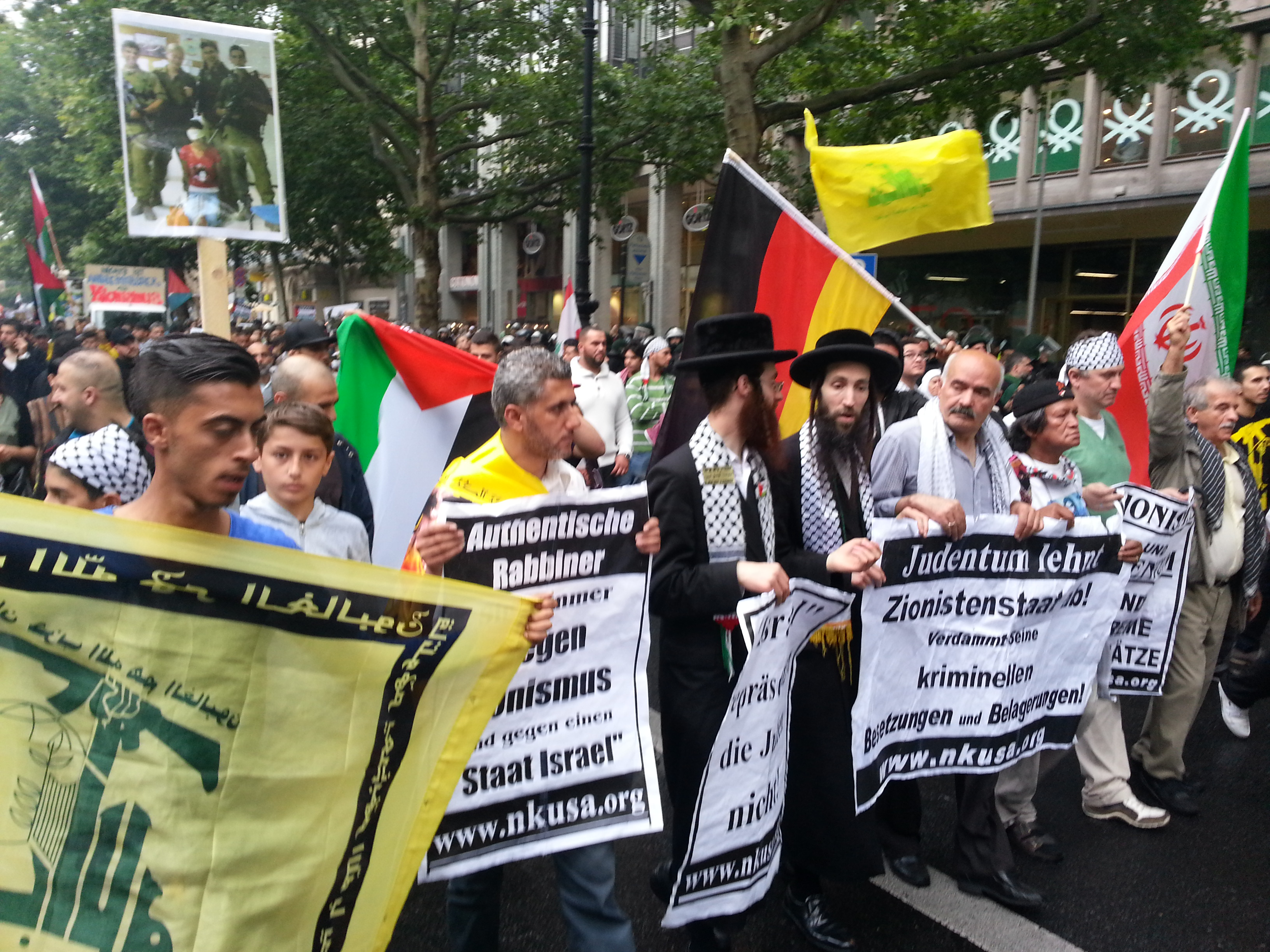
Members of Neturei Karta at the Quds Day protests in Berlin 2014

Generally, members of Neturei Karta are descendants of Hungarian Jews and Lithuanian Jews who were students of the Gaon of Vilna (known as Perushim) who had settled in Jerusalem in the early nineteenth century. In the late nineteenth century, their ancestors participated in the creation of new neighborhoods outside the city walls to alleviate overcrowding in the Old City, and most are now concentrated in the neighborhood of Batei Ungarin and the larger Meah Shearim neighborhood.

Neturei Karta is notoriously vague about its size, and there are no official population statistics available, in 1971, it was reported to consist of several hundred families in Israel and throughout the diaspora. As recently as 2007, the group was reported to have a few thousand members. Haaretz estimated in 2024 that the group had a membership in the low thousands, predominantly in Israel, but also in diaspora locations with large populations of ultra-Orthodox Jews.

== Relationship with other Jewish movements ==
The group's strong anti-Zionist stance and controversial tactics place Neturei Karta on the fringe, even in Haredi, or ultra-Orthodox circles. Other movements, including anti-Zionist sects like the Satmar, have disavowed Neturei Karta and condemned its activities. The Satmar movement criticized Neturei Karta for attending the International Conference to Review the Global Vision of the Holocaust in Tehran in 2006.

During the Gaza war, Rabbi Zalman Leib Teitelbaum, one of the two Grand Rebbes of Satmar, condemned Neturei Karta, asserting “it’s a terrible desecration of God's name to support murderers in the name of the holy Torah.” Rabbi Yosef Yitzchak Jacobson, a prominent Chabad rabbi, also condemned Neturei Karta, saying “I doubt they’re really Jewish.”

One of the targets of the 2008 Mumbai attacks was the Nariman House, which was operated by the Chabad movement. According to Ynet, Neturei Karta subsequently issued a leaflet with a column criticizing the Chabad movement for its relations with secular Israelis, referring to "filthy, deplorable traitors – the cursed Zionists that are your friends." It added that the Chabad movement has been imbued with "false national sentiment" and criticized the organization for not differentiating "between good and evil, right and wrong, pure and impure, a Jew and a person who joins another religion, a believer and a heretic."

Jewish groups often accuse Neturei Karta of selling out their fellow Jews, and using their appearance at anti-Israel rallies as token Jews. In some cases, Neturei Karta have compared Zionists to Nazis, and asserted that "Zionists are not Jews, only racists" and "Zionism does not represent the Jewish people."

According to sociologist Keith Kahn-Harris, Neturei Karta's alliance with "the widest-possible cross-section of pro-Palestinian activists ... has led them to be shunned even by most other anti-Zionist sects, by all Jews who even remotely identify as Zionists and by some secular anti-Zionist Jews."

== Beliefs ==
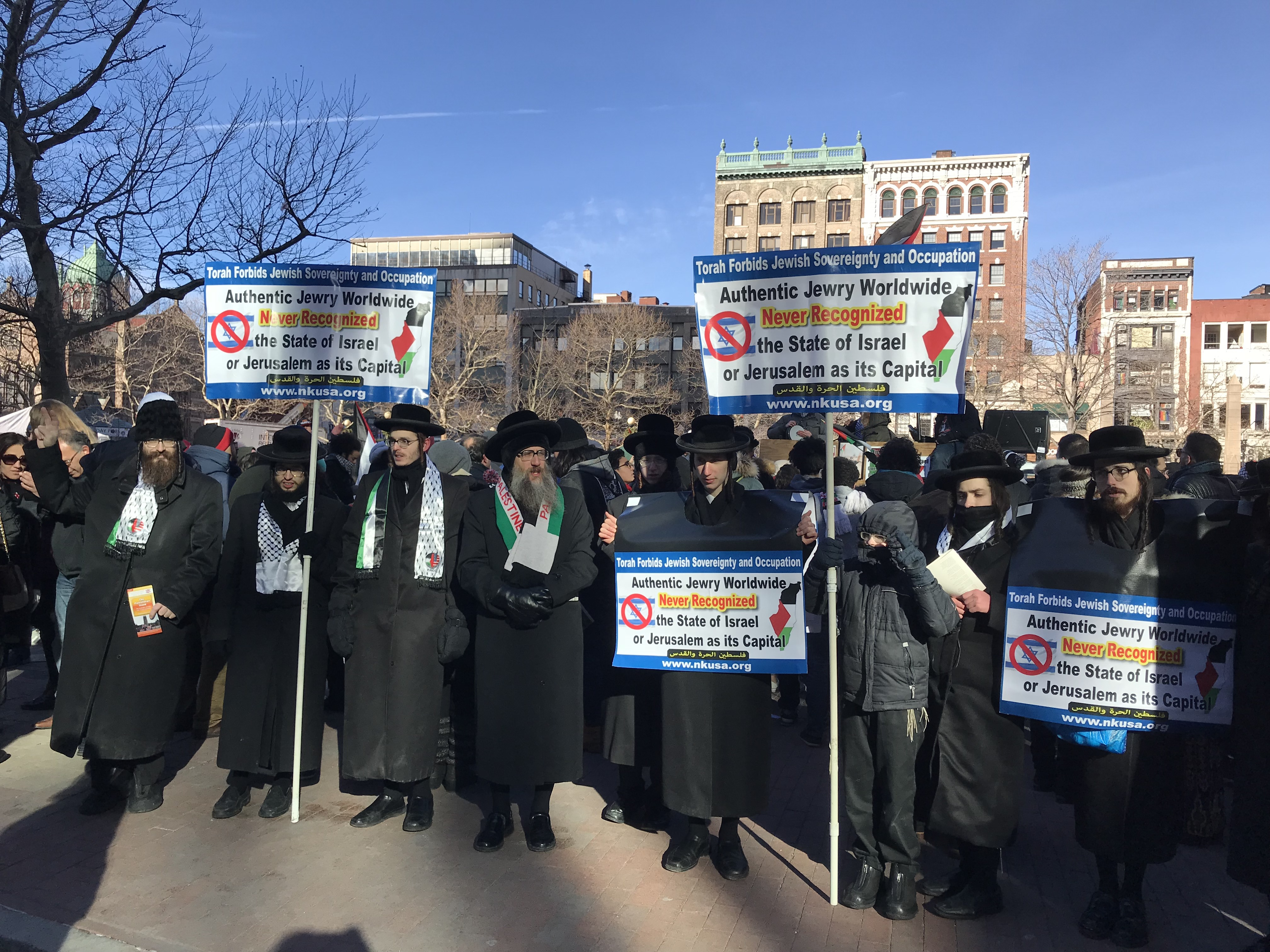
Neturei Karta members at an event in Boston, Massachusetts

=== Exile of the Jewish people ===
Neturei Karta stress what is said in the mussaf Shemona Esrei ("The Standing Prayer") of Yom Tov, that because of their sins, the Jewish people went into exile from the Land of Israel ("umipnei chatoeinu golinu meiartzeinu"). Additionally, they maintain the view that any form of forceful recapture of the Land of Israel is a violation of divine will. They believe that the restoration of the Land of Israel to the Jews should happen only with the coming of the Messiah, not by self-determination, and some believe that the introduction of less-observant Jews would cause problems in the sacred land as defined by the Torah.

=== Conditions for Jewish sovereignty in the Land of Israel ===
Neturei Karta believes that the Messiah will usher in a Jewish theocracy to rule over the Land of Israel. The messiah will bring about the resurrection of the dead, the ingathering of the exiles, and a complete return to Torah law.

Neturei Karta believe that the exile of the Jews can end only with the arrival of the Messiah, and that human attempts to establish Jewish sovereignty over the Land of Israel are sinful. In Neturei Karta's view, Zionism is a presumptuous affront against God. Chief among their arguments against Zionism is the Talmudic concept of the so-called Three Oaths, extracted from the discussion of certain portions of the Bible. It states that a pact consisting of three oaths was made between God, the Jewish people, and the nations of the world, when the Jews were sent into exile. One provision of the pact was that the Jews would not rebel against the non-Jewish world that gave them sanctuary; a second was that they would not immigrate en masse to the Land of Israel. In return, the gentile nations promised not to persecute the Jews. By rebelling against this pact, they argued, the Jewish people were engaging in rebellion against God.

The Neturei Karta synagogues follow the customs of the Gaon of Vilna, due to Neturei Karta's Litvish (Lithuanian) origin as opposed to the Hasidic branch of Haredi Judaism. Neturei Karta are often mistaken for Hasidim because their style of dress (including a shtreimel on Shabbos) is very similar to that of Hasidim. This style of dress is not unique to Neturei Karta, but is also the style of other Jerusalem Litvaks, such as Rabbi Yosef Sholom Eliashiv and his followers. Furthermore, Shomer Emunim, a Hasidic group with a similar anti-Zionist ideology, is often bundled together with Neturei Karta. Typically, the Jerusalem Neturei Karta will keep the customs of the "Old Yishuv" of the city of Jerusalem even when living outside of Jerusalem or even when living abroad, as a demonstration of their love for and connection to the Holy Land.

=== Relationship with the State of Israel ===
In July 2013, the Shin Bet arrested a 46-year-old member of Neturei Karta for allegedly attempting to spy on Israel for Iran. As part of a plea deal, the man was sentenced to 4 1/2 years in prison. Neturei Karta has denied that he had ever been a member of their group.

Neturei Karta's website states that its members "frequently participate[s] in public burning of the Israeli flag." On the Jewish holiday of Purim, Neturei Karta members have routinely burned Israeli flags in celebrations in cities such as London, Brooklyn and Jerusalem.

While many in Neturei Karta chose to simply ignore the State of Israel, this has become more difficult. Some took steps to condemn Israel and bring about its eventual dismantling until the coming of the Messiah. Chief among these was Moshe Hirsch, leader of an activist branch of Neturei Karta, who served in Yasser Arafat's cabinet as Minister for Jewish Affairs.

== Activities ==
=== Palestinian nationalism ===
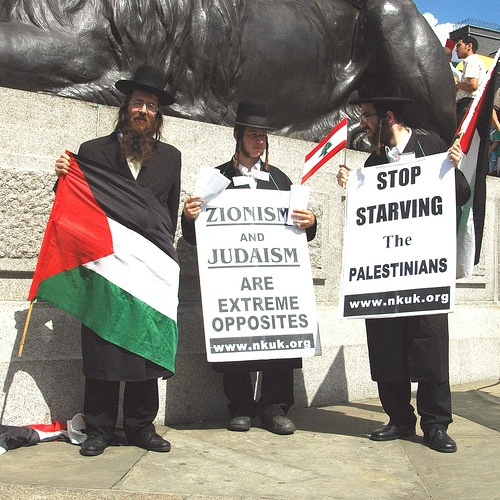
Members of Neturei Karta show their support for Lebanon and Palestine during a peace demonstration in Trafalgar Square, 30th July 2006.

Neturei Karta supports a sovereign Palestinian state in the present, however, argues for complete Jewish sovereignty in the Holy Land upon the arrival of the Messiah.

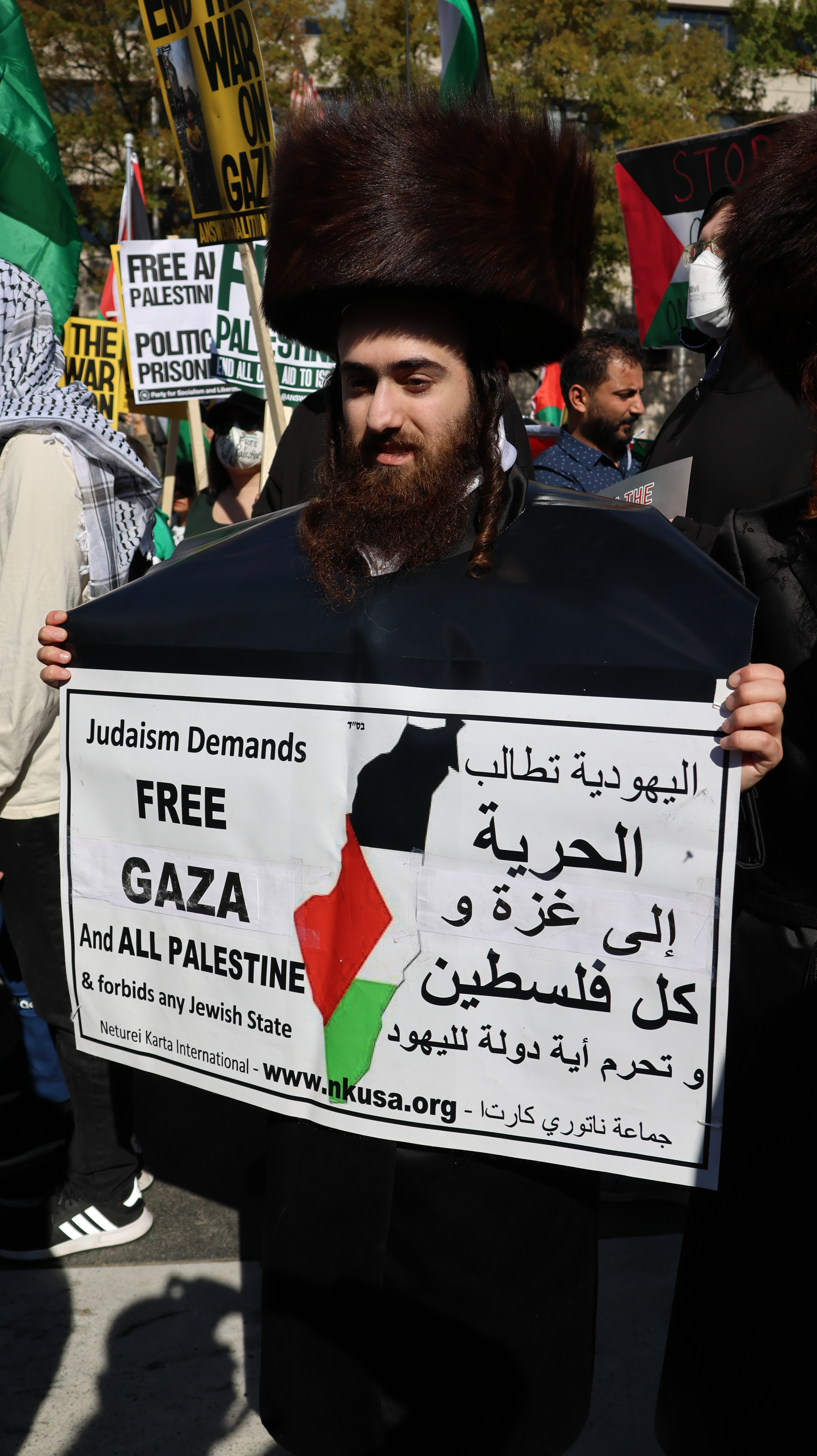
Neturei Karta at the National March on Washington: Free Palestine, 2023

In addition to halakhic opposition to the organization of a Jewish state in the Holy Land, Neturei Karta also criticizes Israeli policies of aggression towards Palestinian people. They have rejected the claim that Israel is democratic, citing what they refer to as racist, genocidal treatment of Palestinians.

=== Relations with Palestinian groups ===
After the Gaza War, four Neturei Karta members crossed into Gaza in 2010 as part of the Gaza Freedom March to celebrate Jewish Shabbos and show support for Palestinians.

In January 2023, three members of Neturei Karta met with prominent Palestinian Islamic Jihad (PIJ) officials and families of Palestinian militants during a visit to the Jenin refugee camp. The Neturei Karta members also visited the home of Bassam al-Saadi, who was jailed by Israel for PIJ leadership activities. Upon their return to Israel, Israeli authorities arrested two of the Neturei Karta members for unlawful entry to Area A of the West Bank. The Satmar rebbe publicly denounced the group for their conduct, remarking in his speech that "It is a terrible desecration of God's name to support murderers in the name of the holy Torah and God's name."

Neturei Karta asserts that the mass media deliberately downplays their viewpoint and makes them out to be few in number. Their protests in America are usually attended by, at most, a few dozen people. In Israel, the group's protests typically attract several hundred participants, depending on the nature of the protest and its location.

Neturei Karta regularly participates in pro-Palestine protests, including protests organized by Palestinian-led groups like Within Our Lifetime. Their signs at Gaza war protests criticize Israel and include slogans such as: "Torah true Jews oppose the aggression in al-Aqsa and the occupation of all Palestine" and "State of 'Israel' does not represent world Jewry!" They took part in the Columbia University pro-Palestinian campus protests and occupations during the Gaza war. According to The Forward, the bulk of their statements at protests do not reference their halakhic opposition to Israel but publicly appear close to the views of left-wing American Jewish groups such as IfNotNow and Jewish Voice for Peace.

Keith Kahn-Harris writes that the visual of the "black-hatted, black-cloaked and bearded" Neturei Karta participating in anti-Israel demonstration "provide[s] irresistible confirmation of what many [pro-Palestinian activists] long to be true: that Zionism is not really Jewish, that Jewish Zionists are inauthentic, that pro-Palestinian activity is not only not antisemitic, it is truly Jewish."

=== Relationship with Iran ===
In October 2005, Neturei Karta leader Rabbi Yisroel Dovid Weiss issued a statement criticizing Jewish attacks on Iranian President Mahmoud Ahmadinejad. Weiss wrote that Ahmadinejad's statements were not "indicative of anti-Jewish sentiments", but rather, "a yearning for a better, more peaceful world", and "re-stating the beliefs and statements of Ayatollah Khomeini, who always emphasized and practiced the respect and protection of Jews and Judaism."

In March 2006, several members of a Neturei Karta's faction visited Iran, where they met with Iranian leaders, including the vice-president, and praised Ahmadinejad for calling for the "Zionist regime" occupying Jerusalem to vanish from the pages of time. The spokesmen commented that they shared Ahmadinejad's aspiration for "a disintegration of the Israeli government". In an interview with Iranian television reporters, Rabbi Weiss remarked: "The Zionists use the Holocaust issue to their benefit. We, Jews who perished in the Holocaust, do not use it to advance our interests. We stress that there are hundreds of thousands Jews around the world who identify with our opposition to the Zionist ideology and who feel that Zionism is not Jewish, but a political agenda. ... What we want is not a withdrawal to the '67 borders, but to everything included in it, so the country can go back to the Palestinians and we could live with them ...".

==== Attendance at Holocaust denial conference in Tehran ====
In December 2006, members of Neturei Karta, including Yisroel Dovid Weiss, attended the International Conference to Review the Global Vision of the Holocaust, a controversial conference held in Tehran, Iran that attracted a number of high-profile Holocaust deniers.

In his speech, Weiss explained that the occurrence of the Nazi Holocaust was irrefutable and spoke about the murder of his own grandparents at Auschwitz, but claimed that Zionists had "collaborated with the Nazis" and "thwarted...efforts to save...Jews" and expressed solidarity with the Iranian position of anti-Zionism. Yonah Metzger, the Chief Ashkenazi Rabbi of Israel, immediately called for those who went to Tehran to be put into 'cherem', a form of ex-communication. Subsequently, the Satmar Hassidic court called on Jews "to keep away from them and condemn their actions".

On 21 December, the Edah HaChareidis rabbinical council of Jerusalem also released a statement calling on the public to distance itself from those who went to Iran. The Edah's statement followed, in major lines, the Satmar statement released a few days earlier. In January 2007, a group of protesters stood outside the Neturei Karta synagogue in Monsey, New York, demanding that they leave Monsey and move to Iran. Neturei Karta and their supporters from Monsey's Orthodox community responded with a counter-protest.

== Factionalism ==
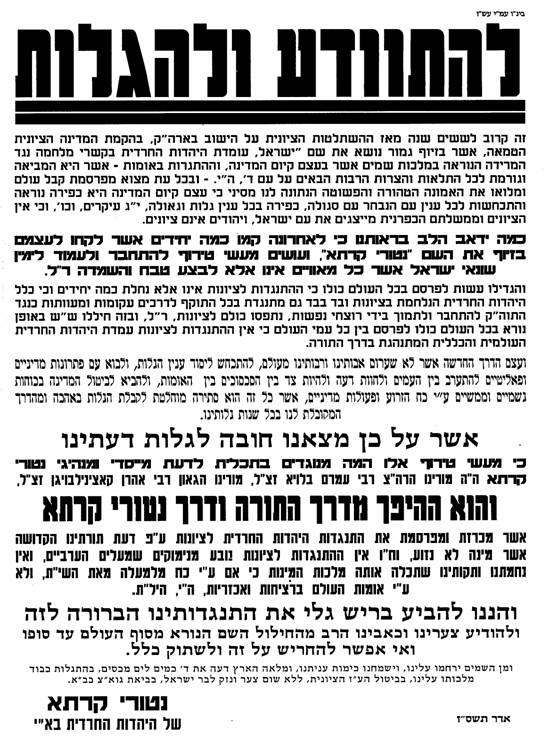
Condemnation poster, or pashkvil

In the United States, the Neturei Karta were led by Moshe Ber Beck of Monsey, New York, until his death in 2021. They affiliate with the radical branch led by Moshe Hirsch. Beck had courted controversy by meeting with Nation of Islam leader Minister Louis Farrakhan, who has been accused of inciting antisemitism and of describing Judaism as a "gutter religion" (Farrakhan says his words were misinterpreted). In addition, after meeting with the representatives from Neturei Karta, Farrakhan indicated he would be more cautious in his choice of words in the future.

=== Sikrikim ===
A radical breakaway faction called Sikrikim is based in Israel, mainly in Jerusalem and Beit Shemesh. The group's engagement in acts of vandalism, "mafia-like intimidation" and violent protests caused several people, including authority figures, to push for officially labeling them as a terrorist group, along with Neturei Karta.

== See also ==
- Jacob Israël de Haan
- Jewish fundamentalism
