= Moshe Hirsch =

Jewish activist and Palestinian politician

- משה הירש
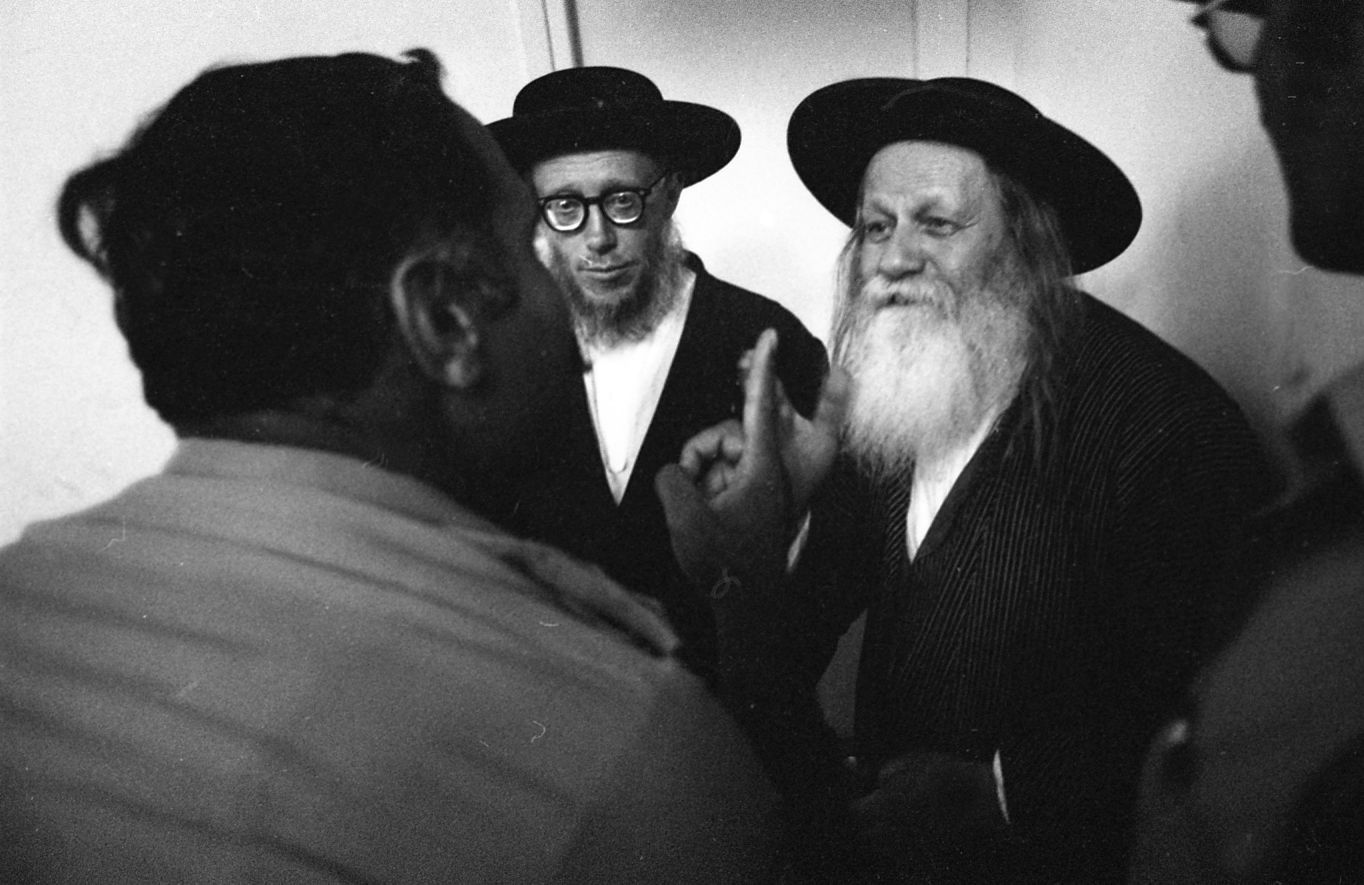
- Hirsch (center-left) with Amram Blau in 1972
- Born: 1924; New York City, New York, US
- Died: May 2, 2010; Jerusalem
- Resting place: Mount of Olives
- Organization: Neturei Karta
- Movement: Anti-Zionism
- Children: Rabbi Meir Hirsch and 2 others
- Relatives: Abraham Rabinovich (cousin); Rabbi Aharon Katzenelbogen (father-in-law, deceased)

Moshe Hirsch (Yiddish: משה הירש; 1924 – 2 May 2010) was a Jewish activist and Palestinian politician who headed Neturei Karta and served as the "Minister of Jewish Affairs" within the Fatah-led Palestine Liberation Organization. He was the son-in-law of Neturei Karta's founder Aharon Katzenelbogen and his first wife. Born in New York City, he later moved to Jerusalem and maintained a close relationship with Palestinian president Yasser Arafat.

Hirsch requested Arafat to grant Neturei Karta members the opportunity to obtain Palestinian passports once they were created. He expressed his refusal to carry an Israeli passport and hold Israeli citizenship. Following the death of Arafat in 2004 and the victory of Hamas in the 2006 Palestinian legislative election, Hirsch pledged allegiance to the new leadership. He then visited the Legislative Council's headquarters in Ramallah to demonstrate his support.

== Family and personal life ==
He was the father of three children. His oldest is Meir Hirsch. Meir had taken over a lot of his father's duties when he was reportedly suffering from Alzheimer's disease. Hirsch had one glass eye due to an injury sustained when someone threw acid in his face. According to his cousin, journalist Abraham Rabinovich, the incident had no link with Hirsch's political activities but was connected to a real estate dispute.

== Death ==
Following Hirsch's death, shiva visitors included senior Fatah members, including Adnan al-Husayni (who brought a personal letter of consolation from Abbas), Hatem Abdel Kader and Bilial A-Natsha.
