= Batei Warsaw =

Neighbourhood in Jerusalem

Coordinates: 31.7879°N 35.2200°E

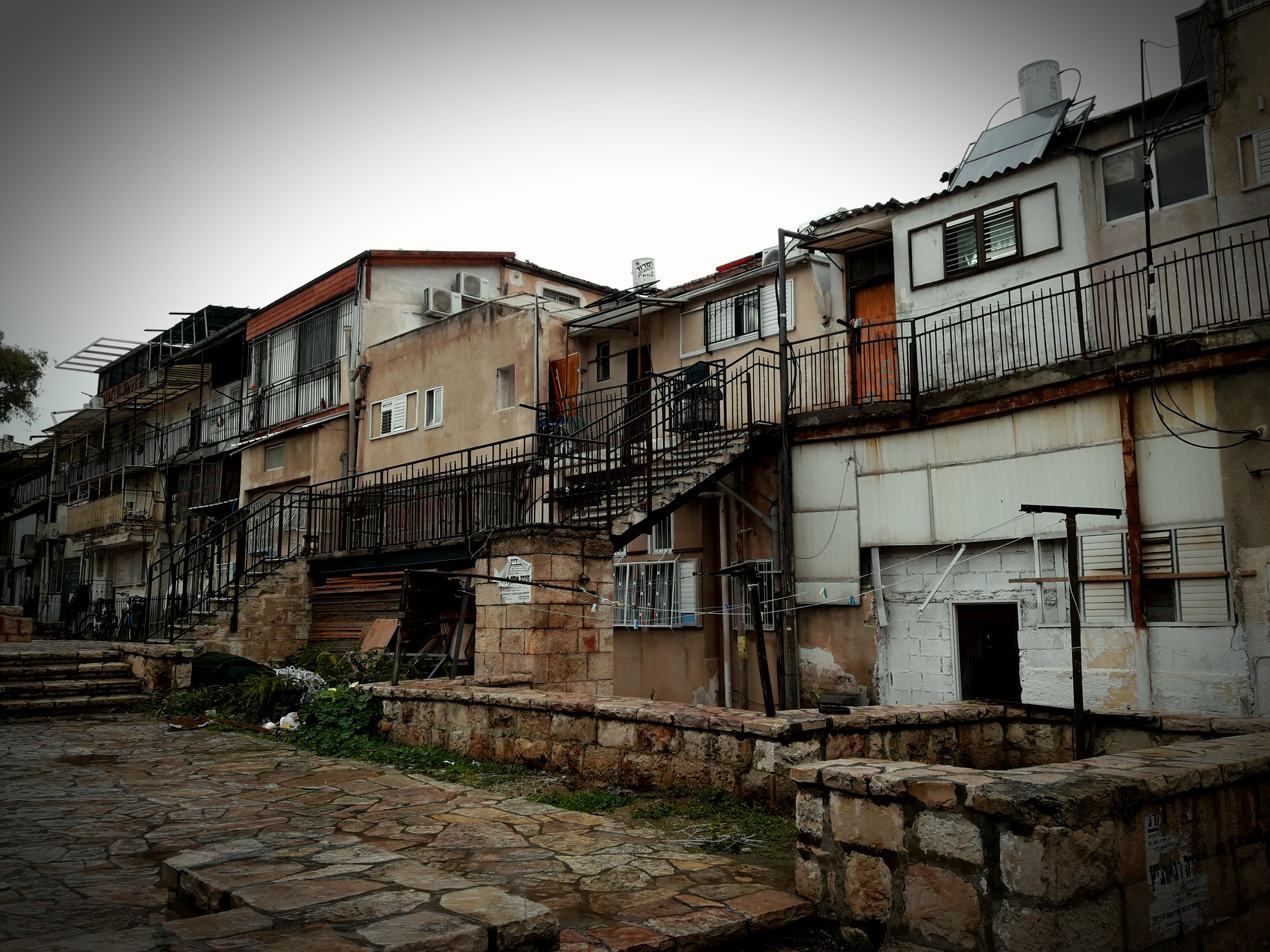
Batei Warsaw in 2018

The Batei Warsaw (Warsaw Houses) (also known as Nachalat Yaakov) is a Haredi neighbourhood on the outskirts of Mea Shearim, near Kikar HaShabbat. It was built in the Ottoman period by Kollel Poland (also known as Kollel Warsaw), for Polish Torah scholars. Their families receive apartments for key money or low rent. The neighbourhood consists of two rows of two-story houses parallel to Mea Shearim Street, between Strauss Street and Chayei Adam Street.

== History ==
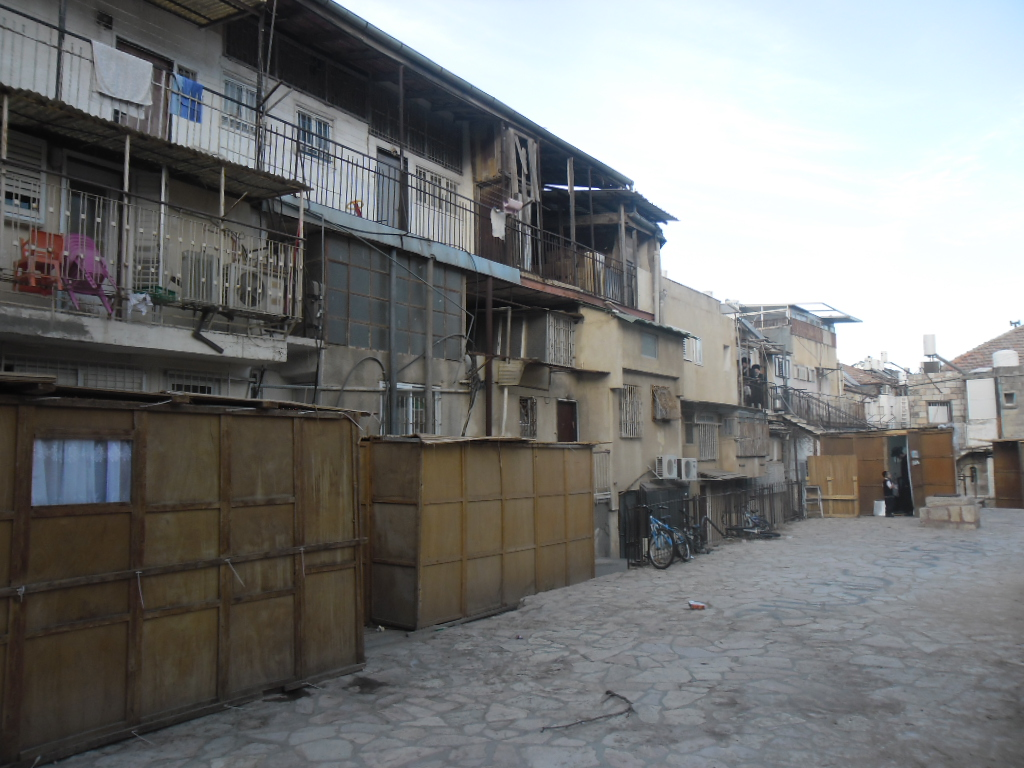
A view of the neighbourhood.

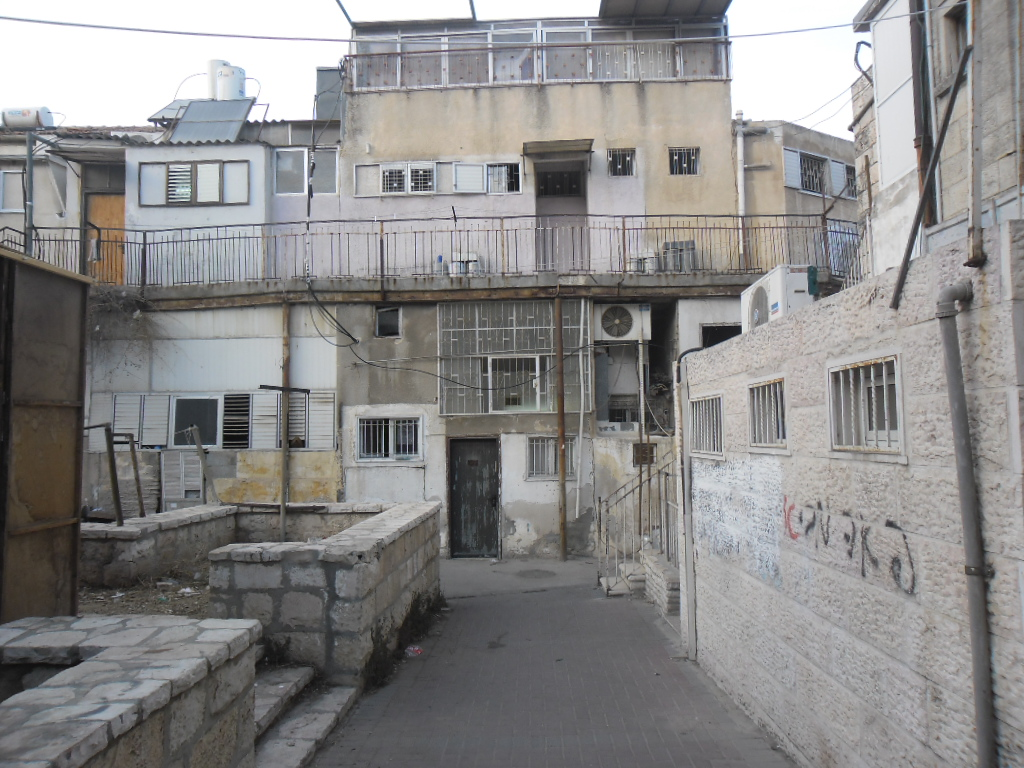

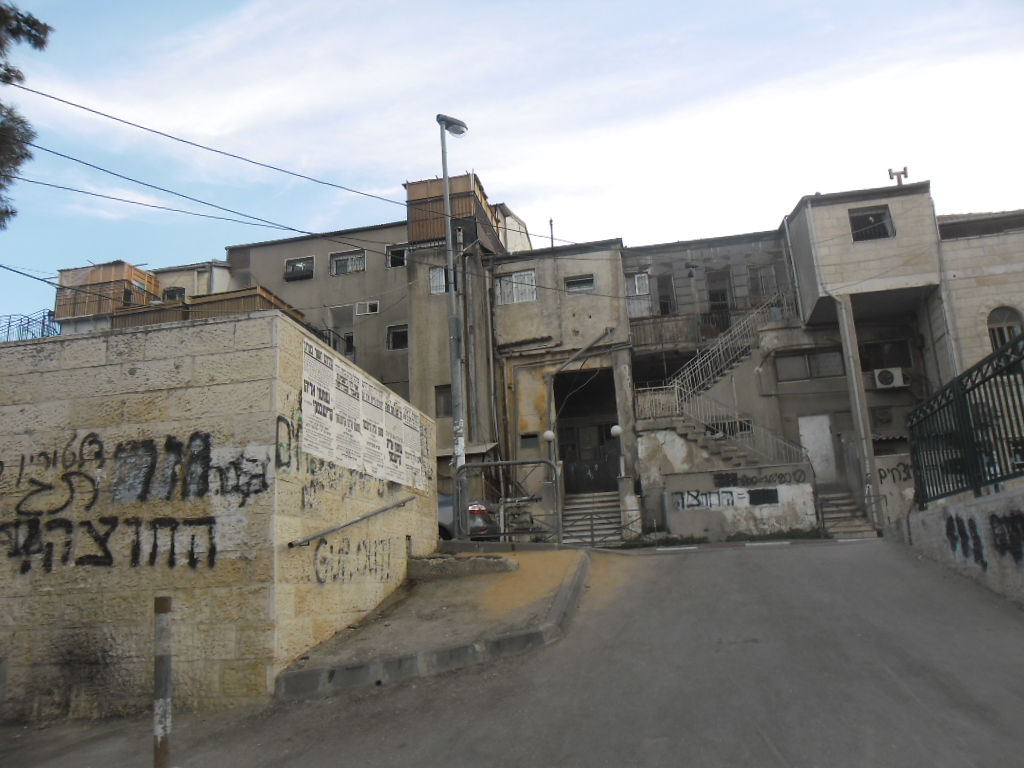

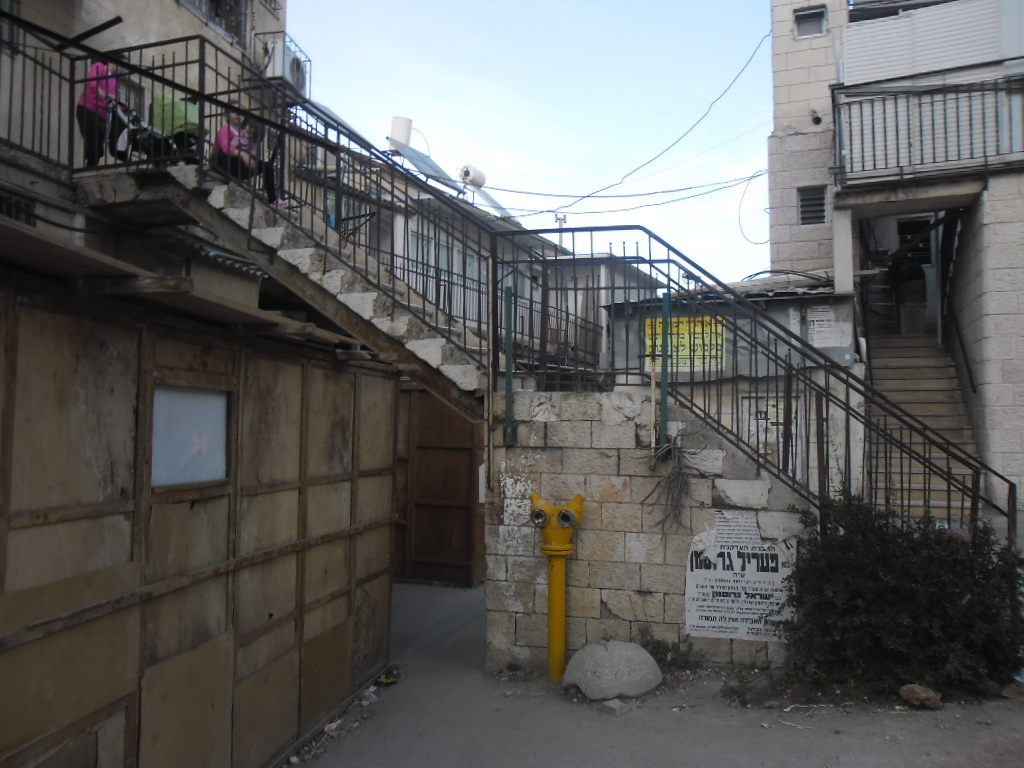

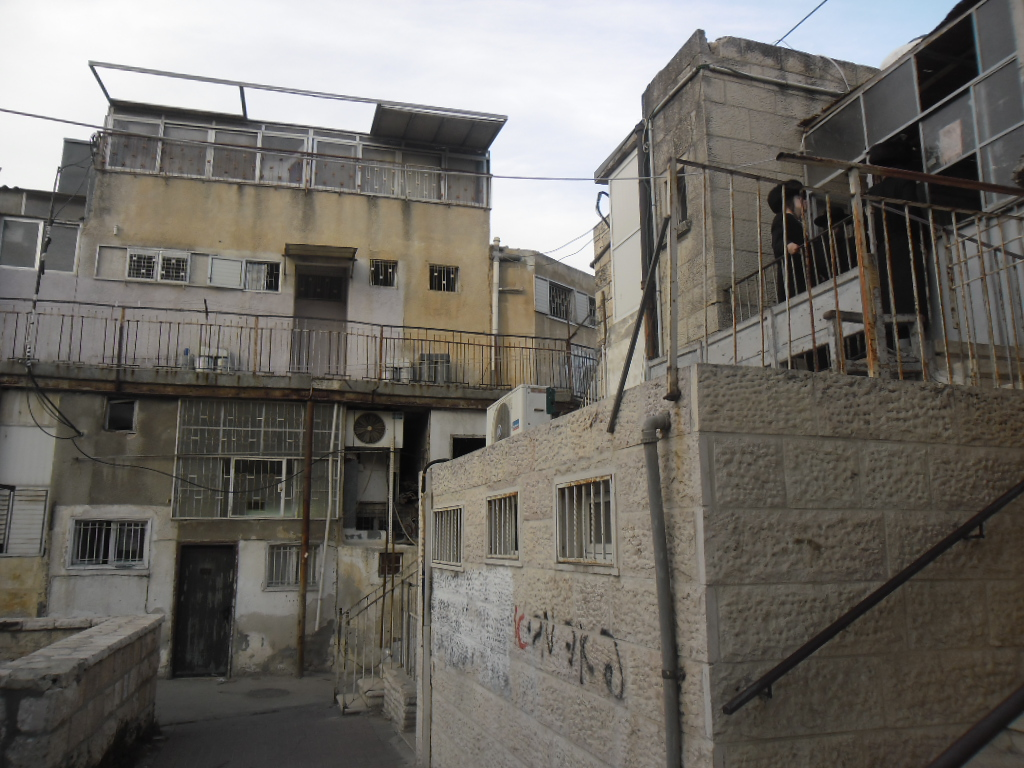

The neighbourhood was established at the initiative of Kollel Warsaw under the leadership of the Lelov Rebbe, Rabbi David Biderman, to provide housing for impoverished Torah scholars, making it the first "kollel neighbourhood" outside the Old City walls. Although the plot was identified as early as 1884, financial difficulties delayed construction. Fundraising began in 1885, and the land was purchased in 1891 by Yehoshua Helfman. However, funds ran out before the houses could be built.

In 1894, the philanthropist Yaakov Tenenwurzel from Lublin donated the necessary funds, and the houses were named "Nachalat Yaakov" in his honor. A notice in the HaḤavaẓẓelet newspaper on May 13, 1898, reported that the neighbourhood had 65 houses rented to families for five-year terms, after which they had to vacate for new tenants. The article described the homes as "good and splendid, large, spacious, pleasing in appearance inside and out, and uplifting to all who see them." In 1924, philanthropist David Weingarten funded an expansion, adding a second floor to the buildings. The property is registered in the land records as the "Biderman Endowment."

An inscription on a stone plaque at the neighbourhood’s entrance reads:

The renowned philanthropist, our esteemed teacher and rabbi, Rabbi Yaakov Shraga, son of Rabbi Yitzchak Isaac Tenenwurzel of Lublin, who was inspired to ascend to the mountain of the Lord here in the Holy City - may it be rebuilt and established soon, Amen - and who dedicated from his wealth the sum of fifty-two thousand rubles, purchasing this land and financing most of the houses. He consecrated them as a sacred endowment for the benefit of the poor of Kollel Warsaw.

Three water cisterns were dug between the two rows of houses. However, unlike many other neighbourhoods in Jerusalem, the cisterns did not supply enough water, and residents had to buy water from Arabs or from the Kerem Avraham neighbourhood.

Since Kollel Warsaw included both Chasidim and Perushim, two synagogues were built: Beit Yitzchak Perushim and the Chasidic Ohel Shmuel. The rooms beneath the latter were intended by Yaakov Tenenwurzel to serve as a Talmud Torah. When they were rented out as residences, a dispute arose between the Kollel and the benefactor.

A newspaper report stated: the neighbourhood now consists of 65 houses for rentals, for five years per family, after which it must leave the apartment to other members of the Kollel. In 1924, the philanthropist David Weingarten donated money to add a second story.
