= Meah Shearim Yeshiva and Talmud Torah =

Yeshiva in Jerusalem

Coordinates: 31.7867°N 35.2230°E

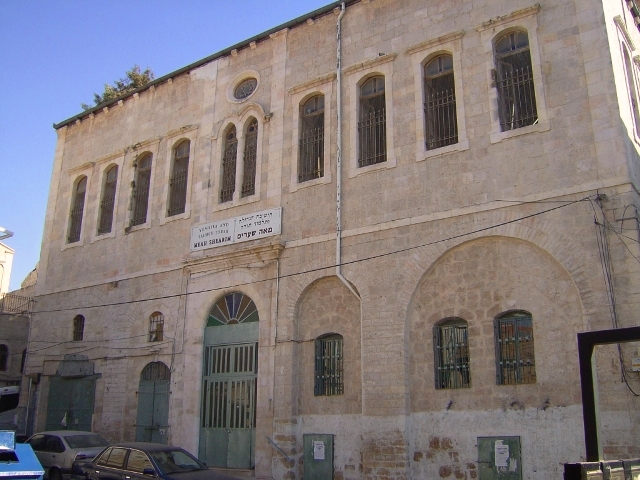
Meah Shearim Yeshiva and Talmud Torah

The Meah Shearim Yeshiva and Talmud Torah is a yeshiva in the Meah Shearim quarter of Jerusalem. It was established in 1885.

The head of the yeshiva was Rabbi Yosef Gershon Horowitz, one of the leaders of the Mizrachi movement. During the British Mandate, the building served as the headquarters of Mizrahi in Jerusalem.

The study hall on the second floor has a magnificent painted ceiling with depictions of Jewish holy places, the Jewish holidays, biblical animals and memorials for the deceased. The artist, Yitzhak Beck, carried out the work on special scaffoldings built for him. The paintings have begun to deteriorate with age and efforts are being made to preserve them.
