= Pashkevil =

Poster placed in an Orthodox Jewish community

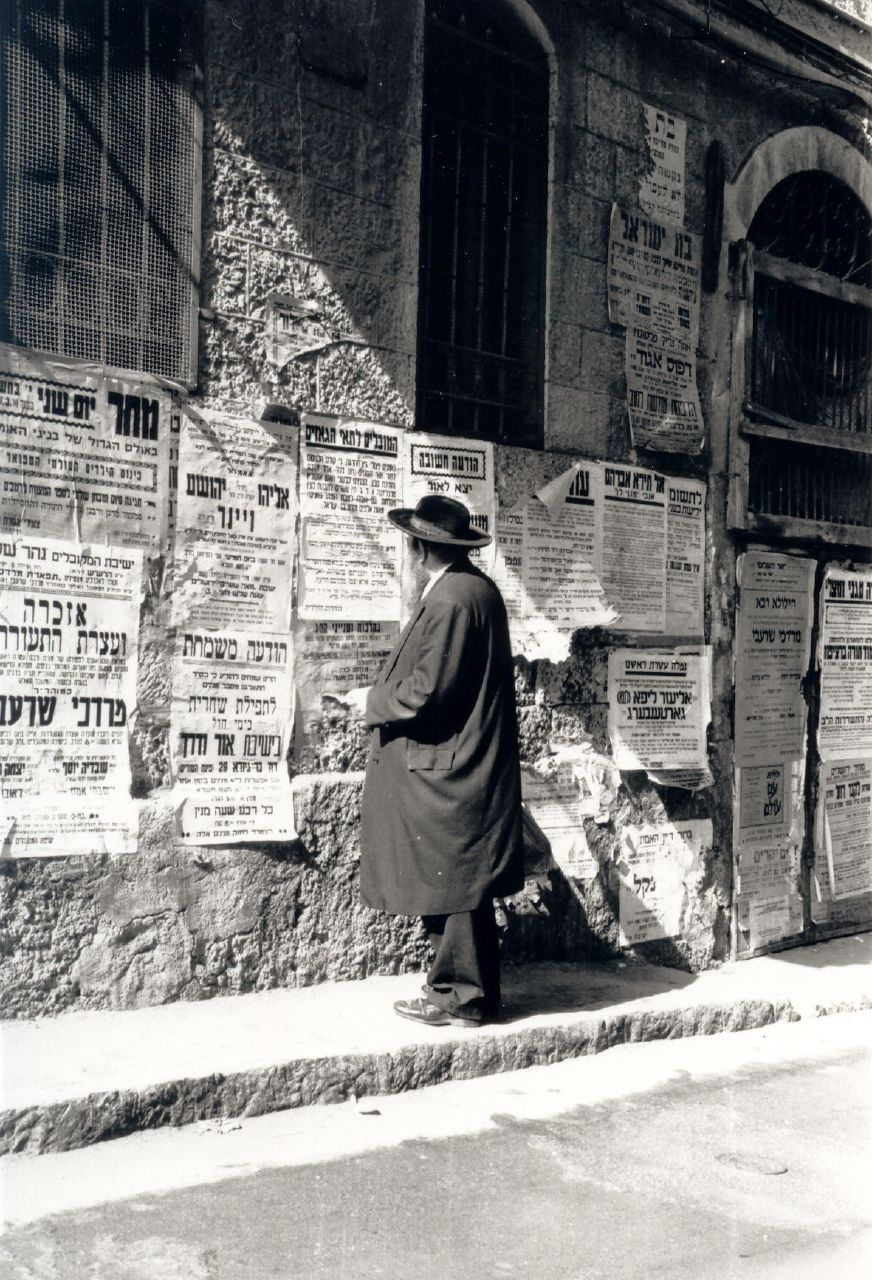
A Haredi Jew reading pashkevilim on a wall in Mea Shearim

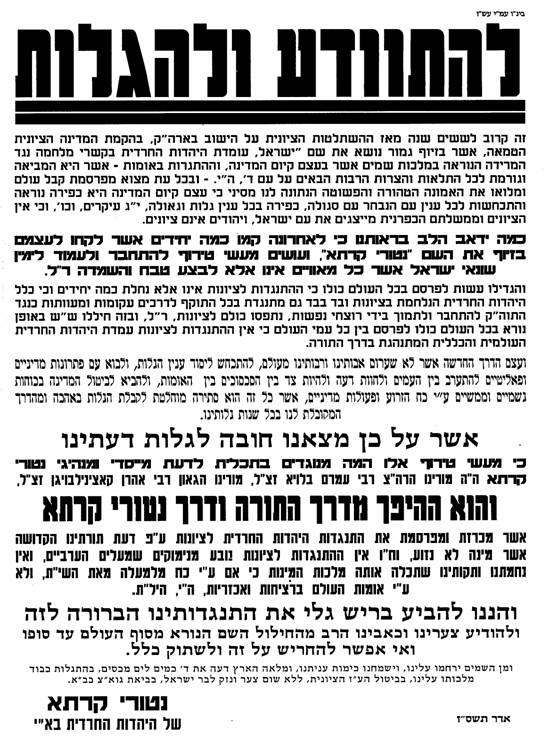
A pashkevil (2006) publicizing Neturei Karta's condemnation of those who associate with the “enemies of the Jewish people.” It was posted in response to the attendance of some of its members at an Iranian-convened conference dedicated to Holocaust denial.

A pashkevil (Yiddish: פּאַשקעוויל; Hebrew: פשקוויל pl. pashkevilim פשקווילים) is a broadside or poster that has been situated on a public wall or location in an Orthodox Jewish community, and most commonly within Haredi enclaves. Pashkevilim are sometimes distributed anonymously; however, many are posted with rabbinic endorsements or the name of an activist group appended to the bottom.

== Function ==
Per Samuel Heilman:

[The pashkevilim] make clear what is virtuous or acceptable behavior and what is not. They serve as expressive media that show what those who prepare and post as well as those who allow the poster to be displayed (the latter by attending to its meaning and not removing or covering it) consider to be acceptable or worthy of notice… The informed observer can thus use such signs as a window through which to glimpse what is appropriate behavior as well as what is on the mind of the community, its interests and concerns.

Given the unique sociological insight to be garnered from their study, the National Library of Israel has begun to acquire private collections of pashkevilim to be preserved in a special section available for academic research.

Pashkevilim are mostly used to protest vehemently against a person the writer disagrees with.

== Controversy ==
The authority of pashkevilim can at times be subject to much dispute. The medium is frequently used as an anonymous means of publicly attacking or undermining a person or group (which is sometimes in violation of the Jewish laws of lashon hara), though many other uses by official rabbinates or other open reliable organizations will use this method for whatever purpose. At times, an anonymously written/signed Pashkevil can be falsely written under a forged signature/name.

== Etymology ==
A column in the Jewish Daily Forward claims the word as a Yiddish term (pashkevil) borrowed from Polish paszkwil, which itself came from the French pasquil, from the Italian pasquinata (as does the English term "pasquinade" for a satire or lampoon). The term has also been explained as a Yiddish word meaning "protest or cry for help". The word made its way "from Yiddish into the Hebrew of the Old Ashkenazi Yishuv in Jerusalem."

== See also ==
- Wall newspaper
- Street literature
- Pasquino
- Moshe Koppel
- Big-character poster
