= Bali Holocaust Conference =

2007 conference in Indonesia

The Bali Holocaust Conference was held on June 12, 2007 in Jimbaran, Bali, Indonesia. The conference aimed to promote religious tolerance and affirm the reality of the Holocaust and was attended by rabbis, Holocaust witnesses, and Muslim leaders, teachers and students. This event was convened by former Indonesian president Abdurrahman Wahid, and was sponsored by the Wahid Institute, the Simon Wiesenthal Center in Los Angeles, and the Libforall Foundation. Wahid stated that although he is a good friend of Iranian President Mahmoud Ahmadinejad, his views about the Holocaust are wrong and that it really happened.

Among the attendants were Abraham Cooper, a rabbi and the associate dean of the Simon Wiesenthal Center; C. Holland Taylor, the chief executive officer of the Libforall Foundation; American Holocaust survivor Sol Teichman; Indonesian Catholic priest Franz Magnis-Suseno; Indian religious leader Sri Sri Ravi Shankar; Tumini, a Balinese woman who was severely burned when al-Qaeda-linked militants targeted two nightclubs in 2002; Rabbi Daniel Landes, director of the Pardes Institute of Jewish Studies in Jerusalem; Alfred Balitzer, Ph.D., Senior Fellow at Claremont Graduate University in the United States and a senior consultant to the Simon Wiesenthal Center; and Ted Gover, of Pacific Research & Strategies, Inc., conference and media coordinator.

== See also ==
- International Conference to Review the Global Vision of the Holocaust
