= Theile =

Theile is a surname. Notable people with the surname include:

- Colin Thiele (1920-2006), Australian author
- David Theile (born 1938), Australian swimmer
- Friedrich Wilhelm Theile (1801–1879), German physician and anatomist
- Johann Theile (1646–1724), German composer of the Baroque era
- Marie-Louise Theile (born 1966), Australian news presenter

== See also ==
- Theil
