= International Conference to Review the Global Vision of the Holocaust =

2006 conference of Holocaust deniers and skeptics in Tehran, Iran

The International Conference to Review the Global Vision of the Holocaust was a two-day meeting in Tehran, Iran, that began on 11 December 2006. It was hosted by the Iranian government of Mahmoud Ahmadinejad, whose foreign minister Manouchehr Mottaki stated that it had been organized "neither to deny nor prove the Holocaust... [but] to provide an appropriate scientific atmosphere for scholars to offer their opinions in freedom about a historical issue." The meeting took place shortly after Iran's International Holocaust Cartoon Competition, which was sponsored by Tehran's government-owned newspaper Hamshahri. Most of the invitees were far-right activists, several of whom had faced legal charges or imprisonment in Western countries for their advocacy of neo-Nazism, Holocaust denial, or Islamic extremism.

Noteworthy non-Iranian participants in the meeting included American politician David Duke, who was the Grand Wizard of the Ku Klux Klan from 1974 to 1980; Australian author Fredrick Töben, who founded the Holocaust denial group Adelaide Institute in 1995 and was later imprisoned in Germany in 1999, the United Kingdom in 2008, and Australia in 2009; and Moroccan ex-military officer Ahmed Rami, who participated in the 1972 Moroccan coup attempt before claiming asylum in Sweden, where he founded Radio Islam in 1987 and was later imprisoned in 1990. The meeting was also attended by Yisroel Dovid Weiss and five other Haredi Jews belonging to Neturei Karta, which is a Jewish anti-Zionist organization that is primarily active in Europe and North America, as well as by Moshe Aryeh Friedman.

Among the meeting's top subjects of discussion was the State of Israel, particularly on the part of Ahmadinejad, who remarked that the country would be "wiped out the same way the Soviet Union was" in his opening speech to the attendees. It was widely criticized by Holocaust scholars as "an attempt to cloak antisemitism in scholarly language" and drew condemnation from many countries and organizations, including the United Nations, the Holy See, and the European Union. Numerous Jewish organizations also specifically condemned Neturei Karta's participation in the meeting, with the Chief Rabbinate of Israel calling for the Jewish attendees to be censured by Jews worldwide. Within Iran, the meeting was criticized by the country's sole Jewish member of parliament Maurice Motamed, as well as by many student protesters against Ahmadinejad's visiting speech at Amirkabir University of Technology in Tehran. Several of the world's leading academic and non-profit organizations cut all ties with their Iranian counterparts following the meeting, citing its pseudo-scholarly presentation of false information that denied the Nazi atrocities that caused the Holocaust death toll.

Counter-conferences were held to focus on a historical analysis of the Holocaust and stories from Holocaust survivors, including the Bali Holocaust Conference, which was organized by Indonesian president Abdurrahman Wahid to combat what he called Ahmadinejad's "falsified history" in 2007. Academic and media coverage of the Iranian conference largely highlighted its lack of qualified historians and researchers, as well as its vindication of Nazism and of individuals who were overtly affiliated with similarly racist and antisemitic ideologies and organizations, such as the American Ku Klux Klan, the Swedish National Socialist Front, the French National Front, and the German National Democratic Party, among others.

== Background ==
According to Iran, the aim of the forum was to "find answers to questions about the Holocaust" posed by Iranian president Mahmoud Ahmadinejad. Since coming to power in 2005, Ahmadinejad had previously engaged in Holocaust denial.

Manouchehr Mottaki, then foreign minister of the Ahmadinejad government, said the purpose of the conference was not to reject or accept the historical reality of the Holocaust. Instead, along with other Iranian officials, he stated that the conference was intended to "create an opportunity for thinkers who cannot express their views freely in Europe about the Holocaust". Its objective was to create "suitable scientific research so that the hidden and unhidden angles of this most important political issue of the 20th century becomes more transparent."

According to Mottaki: "If the official version of the Holocaust is thrown into doubt, then the identity and nature of Israel will be thrown into doubt. And if, during this review, it is proved that the Holocaust was a historical reality, then what is the reason for the Palestinians having to pay the cost of the Nazis' crimes?"

According to scholar Jacob Eder, the conference was an example of an effort to reject Holocaust universality as a form of European American imperialism. The conference served not only to question and deny Israel's right to exist and to provide a forum for Holocaust denial but was also an attack on the West and its values more generally.

== Attendees ==
There were 67 attendees from 30 countries, according to the Iranian foreign ministry. The AFP described attendees as a host of Western revisionists who doubted that the killing of six million Jews took place.

Attendees included:

- American David Duke, a former State Representative of the US state of Louisiana and ex-Ku Klux Klan (KKK) leader
- Georges Theil, a member of the French National Front who was convicted under France's Holocaust denial laws
- German Australian Fredrick Töben, founder and head of the Adelaide Institute who had been imprisoned in Germany for three months in 1999 for Holocaust denial.
- Robert Faurisson, convicted Holocaust denier from France
- Ahmed Rami, a Swedish-Moroccan Holocaust denier who was imprisoned in Sweden for inciting racial hatred
- Psychologist Bendikt Frings, a leading member of the German National Democratic Party (NPD), was invited by Iranian deputy minister of Islamic guidance Mohammad-Ali Ramin; Frings said that he had waited for such a conference "all my childhood".
- Michèle Renouf, an Australian-born British defender of Holocaust denial author David Irving
- Six members of the anti-Zionist Jewish organisation Neturei Karta, including Aharon Cohen, who said he had come to the conference to express the Orthodox Jewish viewpoint. Cohen also said that while the Holocaust indisputably happened, "in no way can it be used as a justification for perpetrating unjust acts against the Palestinians."
- Shiraz Dossa, a professor of Political Science at St. Francis Xavier University in Nova Scotia, Canada, presented a paper at the conference and was castigated for his participation by the Canadian media and his university.

=== Israeli Arab lawyer permission rescinded ===
Israeli-Arab lawyer Khaled Kasab Mahameed was invited to attend the conference by the Iranian government, who rescinded his permission after it was discovered that he holds Israeli citizenship. Iran does not grant visas to Israelis. According to Ha'aretz, Mahameed intended "to tell the conference that the Holocaust did happen and that Iranian President Mahmoud Ahmadinejad's position of Holocaust denial is wrong". He stated:

Everything that happened must be internalized and the facts must not be denied... It is the obligation of all Arabs and all Muslims to understand the significance of the Holocaust. If their goal is to understand their adversary, they must understand the Holocaust... The nakba [disaster] the Palestinians experienced in 1948 is small compared to the Holocaust, but the political implications of the Holocaust have made its terrors a burden on the Palestinian people alone... The Holocaust has all the reasons for the creation of the Arab–Israeli conflict, but also has potential to bring peace."

== Conference ==
The event opened on December 11, 2006, and was organized and hosted by the Iranian Ministry of Foreign Affairs's Institute for Political and International Studies (IPIS).

The Iranian president Mahmoud Ahmadinejad was quoted as saying: "The Zionist regime will be wiped out soon the same way the Soviet Union was, and humanity will achieve freedom [and] elections should be held among Jews, Christians and Muslims so the population of Palestine can select their government and destiny for themselves in a democratic manner."

Papers delivered included "A Challenge to the Official Holocaust Story," and "Holocaust, the Achilles Heel of a Primordial Jewish Trojan."

At the conference, Renouf claimed that the "terrible things" that happened to the Jews in World War II were brought upon by Jewish leaders.

David Duke gave a speech in which he said: "In Europe you can freely question, ridicule and deny Jesus Christ. The same is true for the prophet Muhammad, and nothing will happen to you. But offer a single question of the smallest part of the Holocaust and you face prison."

During a presentation, Jan Bernhoff, a computer teacher from Sweden, claimed that only 300,000 Jews had been killed as opposed to six million.

Fredrick Töben told the conference: "Minds are being switched off to the Holocaust dogma as it is being sold as a historical fact and yet we are not able to question it. This is mental rape."

Aharon Cohen told the conference: "There is no doubt whatsoever, that during World War II there developed a terrible and catastrophic policy and action of genocide perpetrated by Nazi Germany against the Jewish people, confirmed by innumerable eyewitness survivors and fully documented again and again...The figure of six million is regularly quoted. One may wish to dispute this actual figure, but the crime was just as dreadful whether the millions of victims numbered six million, five million or four million. The method of murder is also irrelevant, whether it was by gas chamber, firing squads or whatever. The evil was the same. It would be a terrible affront to the memory of those who perished to belittle the guilt of the crime in any way.

Richard Krege maintained diesel exhaust gas chambers to be an "outright lie," and showed a model of the Treblinka extermination camp to illustrate this. He claimed that up to 10,000 people died in the camp, but of disease, instead of planned extermination. He said, "There is no scientific proof to show that this place was an extermination camp. All that exists are the words of some people." Historians believe that at least 800,000 prisoners were murdered in the camp. Subsequent investigations, as well as previous photographic evidence, have contradicted Krege's claims.

On the second and final day of the conference, Ahmadinejad announced that the conference decided to set up a "fact-finding commission" led by Mohammad-Ali Ramin to determine whether the Holocaust had happened. The commission would also prepare the next Holocaust conference. According to Ramin, the commission would be located in Tehran, but would eventually move to Berlin.

== Reactions ==
The conference was widely condemned as antisemitic and Holocaust denial.

=== Iran ===
Iran's sole Jewish member of parliament Maurice Motamed said: "Holding this conference after having a competition of cartoons about the Holocaust has put a lot of pressure on Jews all over the world;" and that "The conference has upset Iran's 25,000-strong Jewish community."

Though reformist demonstrations had been rare since Ahmadinejad took office, a few dozen students burnt pictures of him and chanted "death to the dictator" as Ahmadinejad gave a speech at Amirkabir University of Technology in Tehran on 12 December 2006. One student activist said the protest was against the "shameful" Holocaust conference, and added that Ahmadinejad had "brought to our country Nazis and racists from around the world." Ahmadinejad responded by saying: "Everyone should know that Ahmadinejad is prepared to be burnt in the path of true freedom, independence and justice."

However, Ali Akbar Mohtashamipour, Secretary-General of the International Congress to Support the Palestinian Intifada, expressed support for the conference, saying that the "Western and Zionist media have always been aggrandizing the dimensions of the reality of Holocaust, mixing a bit of truth with a lot of lies".

=== International ===
Supranational bodies

- United Nations Secretary General Ban Ki-moon said "Denying historical facts, especially on such an important subject as the Holocaust, is just not acceptable. Nor is it acceptable to call for the elimination of any State or people. I would like to see this fundamental principle respected both in rhetoric and in practice by all the members of the international community. United Nations Secretary-General Kofi Annan himself visited Iran and had a series of dialogues with the Iranian leadership and other senior-level people. Wherever and when, and if the situation requires me to do, I am also prepared to engage in dialogue with the Iranian leadership."
- During a visit to Iran in September 2006, then United Nations Secretary General Kofi Annan also criticized this conference, saying "I think the tragedy of the Holocaust is an undeniable historical fact and we should really accept that fact and teach people what happened in World War II and ensure it is never repeated."
- European Union - Franco Frattini, EU justice and home affairs commissioner expressed "shock and indignation" over the conference, adding that "antisemitism had no place in Europe."
- European Jewish Congress condemned the conference as "negationist and revisionist" attended by "pseudo-historians and intellectuals."

States

- Belgium - Foreign Minister Karel De Gucht said he "condemned the revisionistic and negationistic expressions (of Iran) and the repeated questioning of the right to exist for the state of Israel."
- Canada - Minister of Foreign Affairs Peter MacKay said that the conference was "an outrage". "It is an insult to Holocaust victims. It is an insult to their descendants. Canada's new government and I am sure many others in this House (of Commons) and around the globe condemn this conference, just as we have previously condemned the Iranian president's comments about the Holocaust as hateful."
- France - Prior to the conference, Foreign Minister Philippe Douste-Blazy said France would condemn the conference if participants used it for Holocaust denial. After the conference opened, Douste-Blazy stated to French RTL radio, "I reiterate our utter condemnation of this conference and the revisionist ideas it’s given a platform to." He cited this conference as further evidence of Iranian president Mahmoud Ahmadinejad's "shocking" and "unacceptable" statements, and that this conference violated the 2005 United Nations resolution on Holocaust remembrance, which "rejects any denial of the Holocaust as a historic event, either in full or in part."
- Germany - Chancellor Angela Merkel, after a meeting with Israeli Prime Minister Ehud Olmert, said "I would like to make clear that we reject with all our strength the conference taking place in Iran about the supposed nonexistence of the Holocaust." According to the New York Times, the "German government summoned the Iranian chargé d’affaires in Berlin to complain."
- Israel - Prime Minister Ehud Olmert "denounced the conference before embarking on a two-day trip to Germany" calling the gathering "a sick phenomenon that shows the depths of hatred of the fundamentalist Iranian regime." Tzipi Livni, the Israeli Foreign Minister, "commented on the Holocaust conference at a Knesset meeting ... and said, 'I didn’t come to this meeting to argue with the evil one from Tehran and his allies. He can’t erase the pain of the survivors.'"
- Mexico - The government issued a letter disapproving of the Conference and its results. In a statement on its website, the Foreign Secretary wrote that: "The government of Mexico, through the office of the Foreign Secretary, agrees with the international disapproval of the Iranian Conference on the Holocaust...and rejects all negation, either partial or total, of the Holocaust as historical fact."(translation)
- Poland - The Ministry of Foreign Affairs said on its website that Poland "expresses its strong disapproval of the conference, which contradicts the idea of the International Day of Commemoration in Memory of the Victims of the Holocaust established by the UN General Assembly, and celebrated on 27 January...Any attempt at contesting this truth arouses serious concern in Poland, where 6 million people were victims of the Nazi genocide". The Ministry also consigned informational material from the Auschwitz-Birkenau State Museum to Iranian scholars, seeking to "deepen their knowledge" of the Holocaust.
- Sweden - Minister for Foreign Affairs Carl Bildt said: "The Iranian regime's statements about Israel and the questioning of the Holocaust are completely unacceptable, as well as Iran's questioning of the state of Israel's right to exist."
- Switzerland - Foreign Ministry spokesman Johann Aeschlimann said that the ministry condemned any querying of the right of Israel to exist, as had once again happened in Tehran, and of the Holocaust. "The Shoah is a historical fact. It is unacceptable to call this into question."
- United Kingdom - Prime Minister Tony Blair denounced the conference as "shocking beyond belief." Blair also said that it was "a symbol of sectarianism and hatred toward people of another religion. I mean, to go and invite the former head of the Ku Klux Klan to a conference in Tehran which disputes the millions of people who died in the Holocaust … what further evidence do you need that this regime is extreme?"
- United States - The State Department described the Iranian event as "yet another disgraceful act on this particular subject by the regime in Tehran. It is just flabbergasting that they continue — that the leadership of that regime continues to deny that six million-plus people were killed in the Holocaust," spokesman Sean McCormack said. The White House called it an "affront to the entire civilised world."
- Vatican City - The Vatican described the Holocaust as an "appalling tragedy to which one cannot remain indifferent."

Religious leaders

- Archbishop of Canterbury Rowan Williams declared the conference a "disgrace", and called for the Holocaust to be memorialised in order to prevent its denial by future generations.
- Ashkenazi Chief Rabbi of Israel Yonah Metzger called upon Jews worldwide to shun members of Neturei Karta who attended the conference and refuse them entrance to synagogues.

=== Non-governmental ===
Thirty four of the world's leading policy institutes released a statement on 15 December that they would break off all relations with Iran's Institute for Political and International Studies. Signatories included the directors of the International Institute for Strategic Studies in London; the Aspen Institute in Berlin; the German Marshall Fund in Washington; the Geneva Centre for Security Policy; the Center for International Studies and Research in Paris; the United States Studies Centre in Sydney, Australia; and the Center for International Relations in Warsaw. The conference was condemned by the Council on American-Islamic Relations (CAIR).

Ayaan Hirsi Ali called on Western leaders to wake up to the reality of the situation. She stated: "For the majority of Muslims in the world the Holocaust is not a major historical event they deny; they simply do not know because they were never informed. Worse, most of us are groomed to wish for a Holocaust of Jews." She said that she never learned anything about the Holocaust while she was studying in Saudi Arabia and Kenya. She called for action from charities: "Western and Christian charities in the third world should take it upon themselves to inform Muslims and non-Muslims alike, in the areas where they are active, about the Holocaust."

A number of Arab journalists in Kuwait, Saudi Arabia, and the United Kingdom criticized the conference, arguing that it included unqualified non-historian speakers, spread the hate and propaganda of an extremist Iranian government, defended the heinous crimes of the Nazis, damaged Iran diplomatically at a time when its foreign relations were difficult, and reflected a lack of human and cultural sensitivity.

== Counter conferences ==
- Mainstream Holocaust historians held a counter gathering on anti-Semitism and Holocaust denial in Berlin entitled "Study of the Holocaust: A Global Perspective." entitled "The Holocaust in Transnational Memory." The keynote speaker was American Holocaust historian Raul Hilberg, author of "The Destruction of the European Jews, widely considered one of the standard texts on the Holocaust." Topics discussed included the mechanisms and intentions at the root of the various forms of Holocaust denial and the polarization of the Muslim and Western worlds. Speakers emphasized Holocaust denial as a form of anti-Semitism and that Ahmadinejad is using the theme, together with his threats against Israel, to gain international standing among Arabs." Scholar David Menashri stated that a "silent majority" of Iranians would reject Ahmadinejad's Holocaust denial. Holocaust historians attending this conference in Berlin called the Iranian conference "an attempt to cloak antisemitism in scholarly language."
- A symposium was also held in Jerusalem, entitled, "Holocaust Denial: Paving the Way to Genocide," for members of the diplomatic corps. Its scientific adviser, Yehuda Bauer, said Iran's Holocaust denial was raising objections among Arab intellectuals. Speakers included American ambassador to the U.N. John Bolton; former Israeli ambassador to the U.N. Dore Gold; Israel's ambassador to the United States Meir Roseanne; Canadian Parliament member Irwin Cotler; and Harvard University professor Alan Dershowitz. Speaking at the symposium, Yigal Carmon of the Middle East Media Research Institute said "the Iranian regime's Holocaust denial is not a manifestation of irrational hatred, but a premeditated and cold-blooded instrument to achieve its goals [of the] denial of Israel's legitimacy [and the] elimination of the Zionist Entity, i.e. Israel."
- The Simon Wiesenthal Center in Los Angeles planned to hold a teleconference during the same period as the Iranian conference which would focus on individual stories from Holocaust survivors.
- The Bali Holocaust Conference was held in June 2007 in Bali, Indonesia. The conference aimed to promote religious tolerance and affirm the reality of the Holocaust and was attended by rabbis, Holocaust witnesses, and Muslim leaders, teachers and students. This event was convened by former Indonesian president Abdurrahman Wahid, and was sponsored by the Wahid Institute, the Simon Wiesenthal Center in Los Angeles, and the Libforall Foundation. Wahid stated that although he is a good friend of Iranian President Mahmoud Ahmadinejad, Ahmadinejad's views about the Holocaust are wrong and constitute "falsified history", and that the Holocaust really happened.

== See also ==
- International Holocaust Cartoon Competition
