= Mohammad-Ali Ramin =

Iranian politician

- محمدعلی رامین
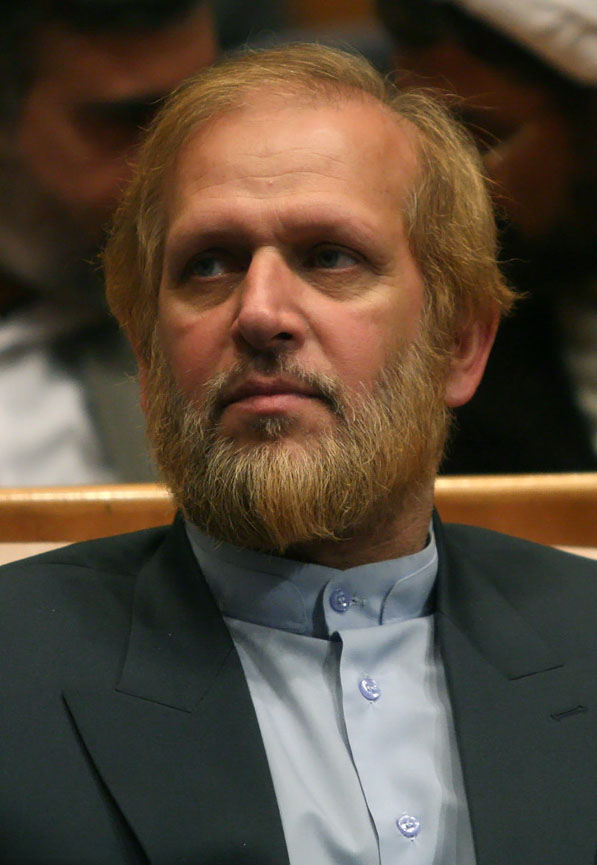
- Mohammad Ali Ramin

Vice Minister of Culture and Islamic Guidance for Press Affairs
- In office 1 November 2009 – 25 December 2010
- President: Mahmoud Ahmadinejad
- Minister: Mohammad Hosseini
- Preceded by: Alireza Malekian
- Succeeded by: Mohammad-Jafar Mohammadzadeh

Personal details
- Born: February 4, 1954 (age 72) Dezful, Khuzestan Province, Iran
- Party: Coalition of the Pleasant Scent of Servitude
- Other political affiliations: Front of Followers of the Line of the Imam and the Leader (before 2005)
- Spouse: Sousan Safavardi
- Children: 3
- Education: Clausthal University of Technology; Karlsruhe Institute of Technology

Mohammad-Ali Raminzadeh, also known as Mohammad-Ali Ramin (Persian: محمدعلی رامین, born 1954) is an Iranian politician, political analyst and writer who served as the Vice Minister of Culture and a presidential advisor under President Mahmoud Ahmadinejad. He organised the International Conference to Review the Global Vision of the Holocaust, a conference involving Holocaust deniers, which took place in Tehran in 2006.

== Early life and education ==
Mohammad-Ali Ramin was born on February 4, 1954, in Dezful, Khuzestan Province. He received his primary education in Dezful, Khorramshahr, and Abadan.

He attended Clausthal University of Technology and Karlsruhe Institute of Technology in Germany, studying Mechanical Engineering and Process Engineering. Ramin lived in Germany from 1977 to 1994, until he was deported, allegedly for having close ties and links with the far-right National Democratic Party of Germany. He speaks fluent German. He founded the Islamische Gemeinschaft in Clausthal.

Ramin heads the Society for the Defence of Muslims in the West and the Islamic Path Organization in Europe, in addition to being the founder of The Cells of the Martyrs of the Velayat and the secretary-general of the World Foundation for Holocaust Studies and the Organization of Islamic Ummah, all of which are ultra-reactionary groups of Islamic fundamentalists. He has stated numerous times that the alternative to democracy in the world is the system of Velayat-e-Faqih (guardianship of the Islamic Jurist).

== Career ==
=== Political career and activism ===
In Germany, he was part of a student group that was involved in the Islamic Revolution early on, and visited the exiled Ruhollah Khomeini in France. In 1982, a clash between the supporters and the opponents of the Iranian Revolution led to a police operation in the cafeteria of the University of Bremen, where an Iranian student was arrested. Mohammad-Ali Ramin acted as an interpreter and was also taken into custody. He was released after six months of pretrial detention, and claims to have been tortured during his detention.

During the presidency of Mohammad Khatami, Ramin was a staunch critic of the Reformists. After returning to Iran in 1994, Mohammad-Ali Ramin published a treatise refuting Rafsanjani's statements that Ali Khamenei should not be addressed by the title "Imam." Ramin is considered to be an intellectual supporter of the movement that recognizes Khamenei as the legitimate representative of Imam Mahdi on Earth. He is the founder of the annual Islamic Conference of German-Speaking Muslims, which went into hiatus in 2003 after Ramin was banned from entering Germany.

He unsuccessfully ran in the 2004 Iranian parliamentary elections. Later, in 2006, he was appointed to Ahmadinejad's campaign team, the same year he founded the Coalition of the Pleasant Scent of Servitude.

=== Views on the Holocaust ===
in December 2006, Ramin organised the International Conference to Review the Global Vision of the Holocaust which took place in Tehran. Prominent attendees included far right political activist David Duke, revisionist historical scholar Robert Faurisson and Haredi Rabbi and anti-Zionist activist Yisroel Dovid Weiss among others. Ramin personally invited German psychologist Bendikt Frings, a member of the far-right National Democratic Party of Germany. The conference provoked international criticism.

According to Aftab News, Ramin was the one who initiated the idea of "relocation of Israel" and also the idea that the "Holocaust is a myth". He himself accepted the full responsibility of this action, as Aftab News reported. In an interview with Financial Times, Ramin stated that he has also initiated the "Holocaust commission" and he is the founder of the Conference on Holocaust in Tehran.

Ramin suggested that former Iranian president Mahmoud Ahmadinejad establish a committee for clarifying the "real extent" of the Holocaust. Ramin praised Ahmadinejad for having voiced his doubts over the Holocaust and the need for relocating the Jews to Europe if Europeans really did the massacre during the Second World War. In a 2006 interview, Ramin said that Adolf Hitler was of Jewish descent, adding that his mother and grandmother were Jewish prostitutes. He argued that Hitler's actions stemmed from a conflicted identity, simultaneous solidarity with and hatred for Jews. Ramin further said that Hitler's associates were largely Jewish and that his goal was to expel Jews from Europe to help establish a Jewish state in Palestine, supposedly fulfilling a broader Western Christian desire to remove Jews from Europe.

Following his ideas and suggestions about the Holocaust, President Ahmadinejad appointed him as an advisor.

Selected quotations:

- On Jews: "Historically, there are many accusations against the Jews. For example, it was said that they were the source for such deadly diseases as the plague and typhus. This is because the Jews are very filthy people. For a time people also said that they poisoned water wells belonging to Christians and thus killed them". He also said the Jewish people have "inflicted the most damage on the human race, while some groups within it engaged in plotting against other nations and ethnic groups to cause cruelty, malice and wickedness."
- On Israel: "By taking the Jews to the Muslim world, they (the West) have created a situation where the Jews will be destroyed. And so you can see that Israel has been created to destroy not only Muslims but the Jews themselves."
- On the West: "When the Islamic Revolution of Iran succeeded and attracted many people around the world, including Christians, the AIDS epidemic came about, and fear again overtook the world. After the September 11 attacks, the deadly epidemic broke out, which was destroyed when the U.S. invaded Afghanistan. On the eve of the invasion of Iran, the SARS (Severe Acute Respiratory Syndrome) illness broke out, but disappeared after the invasion".
- On the 9/11 attacks: "The Zionists have blamed it on the Muslims so that they have an excuse to attack some Muslim nations, but it was all for naught. The Jews had also helped Nero, and it had not saved the Roman Empire from collapse."
- On the Clergy: "Instead of being active behind the closed doors of political parties, NGOs, or other Western-style institutions, our clergy should return to their mosques."

=== Deputy Culture minister ===
In November 2009, the Minister for Culture Mohammad Hosseini appointed Ramin as his Deputy Culture Minister. He continued this position until he was fired by Ahmadinejad in December 2010. During his tenure in this role, he announced bans on several newspapers that were critical of the Iranian government, which Ramin claimed was done in order to create a "moderate environment" for the Iranian press.

Sanctions were placed on Ramin on 23 May 2012 by the European Union for 'abuse of human rights'. The EU identified Ramin as having been complicit in censorship activities while he was in government.

== Personal life ==
During his studies in Germany, Ramin married Iranian activist Dr. Sousan Safavardi. Together they have two sons and one daughter, Mohammad Yasin Ramin (born 1981), Mohammad Amin Ramin (born 1987), and Salehe Ramin (born 1989). He is the father-in-law of Iranian actress Mahnaz Afshar.

He teaches at Payame Noor University in Tehran, and is recognized as a Khamenei loyalist. In Germany, he is primarily known for several dozen German-language lectures released on cassette tapes in the 1990s and his book Das Fasten - Sinn und Vorteile.

== See also ==
- Historical Revisionism
- International Holocaust Cartoon Competition
- Islam in Germany
- Mahmoud Ahmadinejad and Israel
- Nasser Pourpirar
