= Theil =

Theil may refer to:

- Archaic variant spelling of German for 'part' (modern High German "Teil"), for example "Erster Theil etlicher Choräle"

== People with surname Theil ==
- Anders Theil (1970), Danish football manager
- Henri Theil (1924–2000), Dutch econometrician
- Georges Theil (born 1940), French politician
- Pernille Rosenkrantz-Theil (1977), former member of Danish parliament

== See also ==
- Theil index, a statistical algorithm used to measure economic inequality
- Theil–Sen estimator, a statistical linear graph method
- Theil's U, a measure of nominal association also known as the uncertainty coefficient principle
- Le Theil, a French commune name
- Thiel, an etymologically related (and commonly misspelled variant) surname
