= Katajun Amirpur =

German-Iranian scholar of Islam

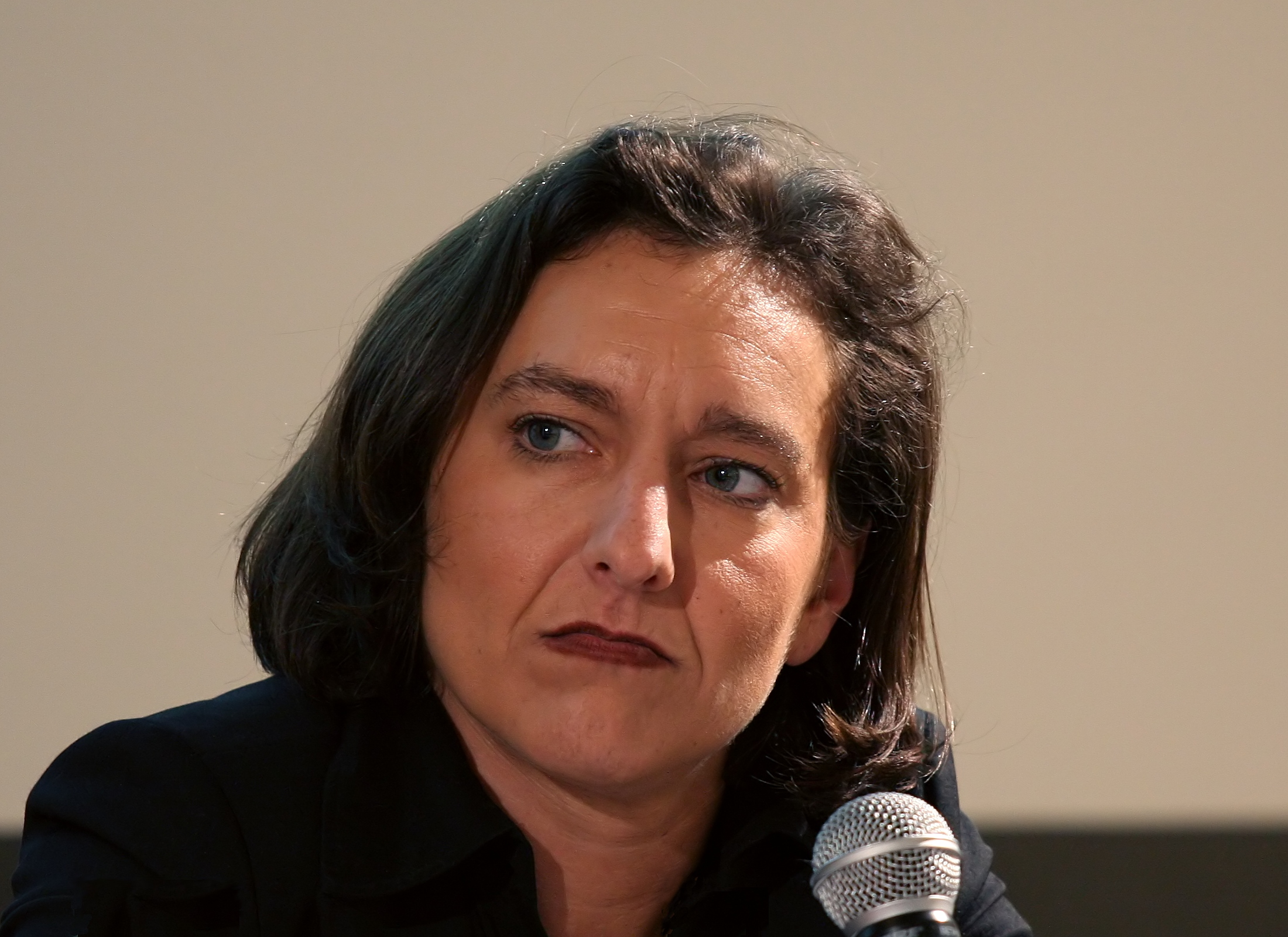
Katajun Amirpur (2009)

Katajun Amirpur (German: [kataːˈjuːn amiːɐ̯ˈpuːɐ̯]; Persian: کتایون امیرپور [kætɒːˈjuːn ɛ æmiːɾˈpuːɾ]; born 1971) is a German-Iranian professor of Islamic Studies at the University of Cologne.

== Biography ==
Amirpur graduated in Iranian Studies at the University of Bonn. She subsequently taught at the Free University of Berlin, the University of Bamberg and the University of Bonn. In 2000, she was awarded her doctorate by the University of Bamberg on the Shiite exegesis of the Qur'an with a thesis on the Thought and Influence of Abdolkarim Soroush in the Islamic Republic of Iran. In February 2010, she was appointed Assistant Professor for Modern Islamic World with a focus on Iran by the university board of the University of Zurich. In June 2011, she was appointed Professor of Islamic Studies at the University of Hamburg. She is one of the editors of the magazine Blätter für deutsche und internationale Politik. Her father, Manutschehr Amirpur, was an Iranian cultural attaché under Shah Mohammad Reza Pahlavi. Her mother is German.

She also writes for the Süddeutsche Zeitung, taz and Die Zeit, as well as comments for the German radio stations, DLF and WDR.

Amirpur lives in Cologne. Until 2020, she was married to the orientalist Navid Kermani.

== Opinions ==
Commenting on the internal political situation in Iran after the victory of conservatives in the 2004 Iranian legislative election she wrote:

"Despite the pervasive hopelessness, there is one important reason why the reform forces will finally win and why time is running out for the theocratic state model. In the course of the long arguments about reform in Iran, society has been lost sight of."

Responding to an interview question about the 2006 Idomeneo controversy she observed:

"One must in no case be subject to the dictates of radical Muslims."

In an article on the current debate about Muslim women, she concluded:

"While it is correct to denounce certain laws of Islam or manifestations of its culture as backward, Muslims who constantly have the feeling that they should be ashamed of their religion will increase their need for cultural self-assertion."

In March 2008, Amirpur wrote in the Süddeutsche Zeitung that "the danger of a nuclear Iran, still nurturing its fantasies of the annihilation of Israel, is artificially talked up in order to justify a military strike against Iran." This arose from a statement by Iranian President Mahmoud Ahmadinejad which he made at the Tehran conference "A World without Zionism" on 26 October 2005, which had reportedly been mistranslated by the "big western news agencies".

MEMRI translated the sentence as follows: "This regime that is occupying Qods [Jerusalem] must be eliminated from the pages of history." The English translation criticized by Amirpur, which was used by Iranian state radio IRIB and then by many other agencies was "Israel must be wiped off the map". She herself translated the sentence as "This regime ... must vanish from the pages of history." Amirpur was heavily criticized for this article in some quarters. The Islamic scholar Mariella Ourghi accused her in the Süddeutsche Zeitung of "splitting hairs" since there was no change to the "meaning and purpose " of the sentence.

Benjamin Weinthal wrote in the Jerusalem Post that German critics of the Iranian regime have accused Amirpur of downplaying the threat faced by Israel and the West from Iran.

In response to the question of how many Iranians shared Ahmadinejad's Holocaust denial, Amirpur stated that "the average Iranian feels no solidarity with the Arabs", that there was little support for the Palestinians among Iranians, and that Ahmadinejad was not addressing Iranians but Arabs, and instead saying what 95 percent of Arabs thought.

== Publications ==
- Reforms to religious seminaries? Tiresias-Verlag, 2002, ISBN 3-934305-27-X
- Understanding Iran, Institute for Tourism and Development, 2002
- The de-politicization of Islam. Abdolkarim Sorūš's thought and influence in the Islamic Republic of Iran. Ergon Verlag, 2003, ISBN 3-89913-267-X
- Opposition in exile as a political actor, 2002
- God is with the fearless, Herder, 2004, ISBN 3-451-05469-8
- Shirin Ebadi, Amsterdam, Sirene, 2004
- Iran showcase, Herder, 2004, ISBN 3-451-05535-X
- Gibt es in Iran noch einen Reformprozess: Does Iran still have a reform process? In: From Politics and History, Federal Agency for Civic Education, 23 February 2004
