= Ahmadiyya in Indonesia =

Islamic movement

Ahmadiyya (Indonesian: Ahmadiyah) is an Islamic branch in Indonesia. The earliest history of the community in Indonesia dates back to the early days of the Second Caliph. During the summer of 1925, roughly two decades prior to the Indonesian revolution, a missionary of the Community, Rahmat Ali, stepped on Indonesia's largest island Sumatra. He established the movement with 13 devotees in Tapaktuan, in the province of Aceh. The Community has an influential history in Indonesia's religious development. However, in the modern times it has faced increasing intolerance from religious establishments in the country and physical hostilities from radical Muslim groups. The Association of Religion Data Archives estimates around 400,000 Ahmadi Muslims, spread over 542 branches across the country.

== History ==
=== First contact ===
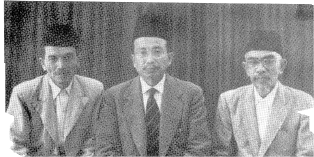
The Three Pioneers, in their later years. From left to right: Ahmad Nurdin, Abubakar Ayub, Zaini Dahlan.

The history of the Ahmadiyya Muslim Community in Indonesia begins in 1925, during the era of Dutch colonization of the Indonesian archipelago, approximately two decades prior to the Indonesian Revolution. However, contact with the Indonesian people and Ahmadi Muslims of India dates back a few years earlier. In 1922, in order to further their religious studies, three Indonesian students, Abubakar Ayyub, Ahmad Nuruddin and Zaini Dahlan, from Sumatra Tawalib, a boarding school in Sumatra, initially planned to travel to Islamic institutions in Egypt, which during that period were known for their reputation in the Muslim world. However, their teachers advised them to travel to India, which according to them was increasingly becoming a center of Islamic thought. It has been suggested that a number of Ahmadi Muslim journals and books published in India were widely circulated in South East Asian countries of Singapore, Malaysia and Indonesia, in the 1920s. Moreover, in October 1920, Khwaja Kamal-ud-Din, the leader of the splinter group Lahore Ahmadiyya Movement toured Southeast Asia where he successfully managed to win confidence among some Indonesian Muslims. He delivered a number of speeches in Surabaya and Batavia which attracted headlines in several leading newspapers. It has been postulated that this may have been the trigger for the teachers to recommend a trip to India.

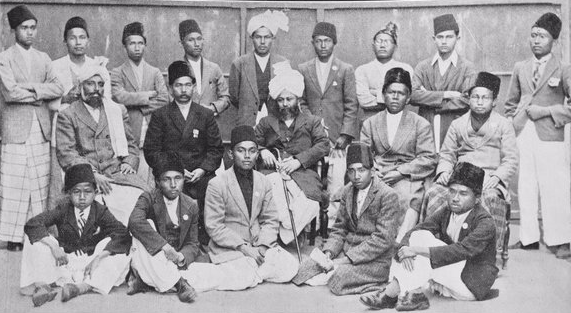
Ahmadi students and converts from the Dutch East Indies in the presence of the Caliph Mirza Basheer-ud-Din Mahmood Ahmad

On complying with their teachers advice, all three students set out separately and reunited in the north Indian city of Lucknow. Whilst in the city they began their education in Islamic studies at Madrasah Nizhamiyyah Darun Nadwah under the supervision of Abdul Bari-al Ansari. Feeling unsatisfied, and having recalled a lecture by Khwaja Kamal-ud-Din in Java, they soon set out towards his city, Lahore, over 500 miles north west of Lucknow, and encountered with members of the Lahore Ahmadiyya Movement, which at that time had already split with the main Ahmadiyya Muslim Community, still based in Qadian. Impressed by the Ahmadi teachings under the supervision of Maulana Abdus Sattar, and on the other hand, having discovered the split of the Lahori Ahmadis, they decided to travel to Qadian. Multiple theories abound as for the justification for this move. It has been suggested that the students desired to know more about the source of the teachings of Ahmadiyya and Mirza Ghulam Ahmad. However, a more popular opinion suggests that Abdus Sattar was himself convinced of the superiority of the main branch, the Ahmadiyya Muslim Community and was spiritually aligned to them. Soon after their arrival, the three students decided to take oath of allegiance at the hands of Caliph Mirza Basheer-ud-Din Mahmood Ahmad and opted to continue their studies in Qadian. On invitation, a further 23 students from the Indonesian boarding school Sumatra Tawalib, arrived in Qadian to further pursue Islamic studies and having learnt of the Ahmadi teachings, they too converted to the Ahmadiyya movement. In 1924, the caliph toured the Middle East and Europe. Having learnt this, a number of Indonesian students, whilst still studying in Qadian, desired that their caliph should also visit the East, in particular the Indonesian archipelago. In a formal speech delivered in Arabic to the caliph, by Haji Mahmud, a spokesman for the Indonesian students in Qadian, the students expressed this very desire. The caliph, assured them that he himself will not be able to visit Indonesia but will soon send a representative, a missionary, to the region. Subsequently, in the summer of 1925, under the directive of the caliph, Rahmat Ali, a missionary of the Ahmadiyya movement, arrived in Tapaktuan, Aceh, the northern province of the Sumatra Island. With this, the foundation of the Ahmadiyya movement in Indonesia was laid. In the history of the Community, the three aforementioned students are renowned as the early pioneers of the Ahmadiyya movement in Indonesia. Through their pioneering efforts, and various missionaries of the Community, Ahmadiyya was to spread across Indonesia.

=== Establishment ===
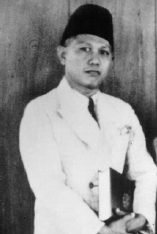
R. Muhyiddin. First President of the Jemaat Ahmadiyah Indonesia. Died 1946.

On October 2, 1925, with 13 members, under the leadership of Rahmat Ali, the first branch of the movement was established in Tapaktuan. A few months later, in 1926, Rahmat Ali moved to Padang, in the west coast of Sumatra and established the second branch of the movement. Following this, several branches of the movement were established all over the Island. In 1931, Rahmat Ali moved to Batavia (known today as Jakarta, the capital of Indonesia), in the northwest coast of Java Island. Although the Community had established a number of branches throughout the country, it was not until a conference was held in December 1935 that the organisational structure of the Community was established. R. Muhyiddin was elected as the first president of the Ahmadiyya Muslim Community in Indonesia. The Indonesian branch adopted the name Ahmadiyah Qadian Departemen Indonesia, which was later changed to Anjuman Ahmadiyah Departemen Indonesia in June 1937. In late 1949, after the Indonesian Revolution, the name was once again changed to Jemaat Ahmadiyah Indonesia (JAI), thereby emphasizing the organizational nature of the Community and its connection to the worldwide Ahmadiyya Muslim Community.

In a separate development, the Lahore Ahmadiyya Movement, which had split from the main Ahmadiyya Muslim Community in 1914, sent its first missionary Mirza Wali Ahmad Baig in 1926. Although the Lahore Ahmadiyya was established in the country on December 10, 1928, it was not legally registered in the country (as Gerakan Ahmadiyah Indonesia 'GAI') until the following September. Due to a lack of effort produced by the Lahori Ahmadis in seeking converts in Indonesia, and into the faith in general, the group failed to attract a sizeable following. In particular, Mirza Wali Ahmad Baig was the last missionary of the group, in contrast to the main Ahmadiyya movement, which had sent missionary after missionary to Indonesia. Due to the organizational strength adopted in overseas missionary activity, during the era of the second Caliphate, and for various financial and theological reasons, the main Ahmadiyya branch became increasingly successful in gaining converts to their interpretation of Islam. Shielded by Indonesia's Constitution, which guaranteed religious freedom, the Ahmadi Community continued to grow, whilst facing little persecution up until the fall of the Suharto government.

=== Early development ===
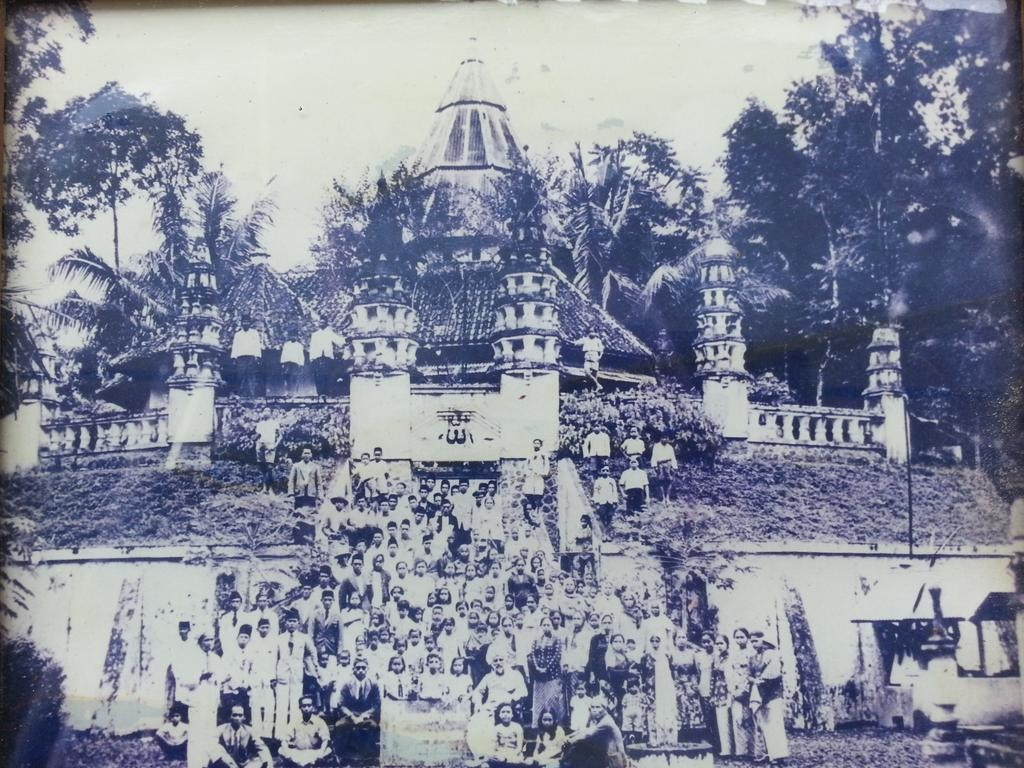
An early community of Ahmadi Muslims in front of a mosque in Singaparna, Java, in the late 1920s.

Discussions, lectures, and debates played a crucial role in the early progress of the Ahmadiyya movement in Indonesia. As soon as Rahmat Ali arrived in Tapaktuan, the first lecture he organized was on the death of Jesus, concerning which Ahmadi Muslims hold a distinctive theological perspective from mainstream Muslims and Christians. Many early converts to the Ahmadiyya movement are attributed to theological debates, including, but not limited to the death of Jesus. However, many conversions required more than satisfactory arguments, and it was not solely debates that attracted people. The charisma, attitude and the 'spiritual power' of the missionaries appealed to the public. The patience exemplified by the Ahmadi debaters in face of abusive criticisms and humiliation played an important role.

A year later, following the arrival of Rahmat Ali, a committee Komite Mencari Hak (committee for finding the truth) was assembled by Tahar Sultan Marajo, a non-Ahmadi Muslim in the Pasar Gadang locality of Padang, western Sumatra, in order to bring Ahmadi missionaries and orthodox clerics together to debate on religious matters. However, the debate did not ensue as the clerics did not appear. According to Ahmadi reports, some of the committee members converted to Ahmadiyya. Some of the most famous debates, in the early years of the movement, between Ahmadi Muslims of Indonesia and the orthodox clergy was with Persatuan Islam, an Indonesian Islamic organization founded in 1923. The debates were commonly held in Bandung and Batavia, both of which lie in the western portion of Java. The first debate with Persatuan Islam was on the death of Jesus, attended by over a 1,000 people and lasted over three days during April 1933. A second debate discussing wider topics, was held in September of the same year, and was witnessed by over 2,000 people.

Local millenarian beliefs concerning the arrival of a Ratu Adil (Just Ruler), the Imam Mahdi, and the promised Messiah were some of the pull factors that accompanied the rise of the Ahmadiyya movement in Indonesia. Before the arrival of Ahmadiyya in Cisalada, Bogor, villagers believed that a messenger of the Messiah would arrive at their village some day. Traditions from the village state that its people should follow this messenger whenever he arrives, even if he were a 'snake charmer' – a common practice found in India. Similar beliefs in the coming of the Imam Mahdi or the promised Messiah abound in many cultures, traditions and ethnicities all over the islands of Java and Lombok. Mass conversions ensued in villages across Indonesia.

=== Influence ===
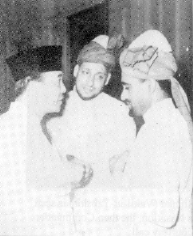
President Sukarno with two Ahmadi leaders: President of Jemaat Ahmadiyah Indonesia and a missionary, at the Presidential Palace, 1950.

Reports by Ahmadi Muslim missionaries suggest that Ahmadiyya literature on Christianity had helped reinforce confidence among the mainstream Muslim populace in the Islamic religion, particularly when facing Christian missionary activity. With a few exceptions, no Indonesian literature provided a critical analysis of Christianity and other religions other than that of Ahmadiyya. In contrast to the main Ahmadiyya movement, the small Lahore Ahmadiyya group focused translations of Ahmadiyya literature into Dutch, the language of the Indonesian intelligentsia of that period. With reference to the Ahmadiyya missionary activity, President Sukarno, the first president of Indonesia following independence, is purported to have said:

The nature of its system in propagating Islam is through an apologetic method, that is to say propagating Islam by defending it against the offensive attacks by the Christian world: to propagate Islam by showing its truth to the Christian world’s critics

According to B.J. Boland, the apologetic and polemic characteristic of Ahmadiyya literature has become a guide and inspiration for Muslim organizations across Indonesia that deal with missionary activities. Although Indonesian Sunni clerics hold this fact from public for fear of arousing resistance, some do recognize that their references come from Ahmadiyya literature. Some consider the Ahmadi apologetic method justifiable in dealing with Christian influence in the country, particularly during the early decades of Indonesian independence, because Christian missionaries heavily preached their religion in the midst of a Muslim-majority society. Ahmadiyya literature provided an effective tool for defending Islam against Christian allegations, whilst creating an atmosphere of Islamic superiority. Nevertheless, after Indonesia became increasingly stable, following a fall in Christian missionary activity, the mainstream Sunni preachers began to increasingly neglect Ahmadiyya literature, giving rise to persecution.

== Demographics ==
According to various independent estimates, the number of Ahmadi Muslims range from 200,000 to 500,000 members, spread over 542 branches across Indonesia. The Association of Religion Data Archives estimates around 400,000 Ahmadi Muslims in the country. There are an estimated 289 Ahmadi mosques and an estimated 110 mission houses. In contrast to independent estimates, the Indonesian Ministry of Religious Affairs estimates around 80,000 members in the country,

The Lahore Ahmadiyya movement, also known as Gerakan Ahmadiyyah Indonesia (GAI) in Indonesia, had only 400 members up until the 1940s. Due to a lack of effort produced by the Lahori Ahmadis in seeking converts in Indonesia, and into the faith in general, the group failed to attract a sizeable following. By the 1970s the group's membership stood between 500 and 1000 people. In the 1980s, it fell to 708 members.

== Persecution ==
=== Rise of intolerance ===
Since the earliest days of the Ahmadiyya Islamic movement in Indonesia numerous fatwas have been issued by Indonesian religious organizations. One of the earliest to issue a fatwa was the Sunni Indonesian movement Muhammadiyah, which issued its fatwa in 1929, declaring anyone who does not believe in the finality of Muhammad as infidel. Although the fatwa does not explicitly mention Ahmadiyya, nor Ahmadi Muslims, it is believed that it was directed at the Ahmadiyya movement. However, Muhammadiyah initially maintained cordial relations with the small Lahore Ahmadiyya group, so much so that it was rumoured that the two groups were going to merge. In 1935, local members of the Indonesian Ulema Council in East Sumatra issued their first warning of the 'heretical' status of the Ahmadiyya. However it was not until 1965 that this position was formalized through a fatwa. Having produced little influence, the national body of the Indonesian Ulema Council took up the issue and in 1980 issued its first fatwa against the Ahmadiyya movement, although it excluded the splinter Lahore Ahmadiyya group from this ordeal. It declared Ahmadi Muslims outside the pale of Islam, "deviant" and that the government is to give ear to the Council in its dealings with Ahmadi Muslims. As a result, the Ministry of Religious Affairs issued a statement declaring the Ahmadiyya movement as a 'deviant' sect. However the New Order government of the second President of Indonesia, Suharto, gave little support in the implementation of the final part of the fatwa through actual state policy.

With the fundamentalist Islamist organizations still unsatisfied, the Indonesian Ulema Council were pressured to issue another fatwa 25 years later, in July 2005. This time, the council additionally charged Ahmadi Muslims of apostasy. The fatwa, entitled Aliran Ahmadiyah (Ahmadiyya branch), cited a 1985 fatwa by the Organisation of Islamic Cooperation on Ahmadi Muslims and placed itself above the Indonesian government with respect to its treatment towards Ahmadi Muslims. It demanded that the fatwa be enforced. The fatwa ordered the government to impede the spread of Ahmadi teachings among the Muslim populations, suspend the organizational activity of the movement and seal off all public Ahmadi buildings, such as mosques. This fatwa, accompanied with the fall of the Suharto government a few years back in 1998, played a pivotal role in providing ideological justification and an open platform for the opposition and the persecution of Ahmadi Muslims all over the country. In the Post-Suharto era, the Yudhoyono government has generally overlooked the hostilities by radical Muslim groups against Ahmadi Muslims.

In June 2017, there were reports by human right groups stating that the government refused issue to Ahmadi Muslims state ID cards unless they renounce their belief.

=== Violence against Ahmadis ===
With violence and large demonstrations, in 2008, many Muslims in Indonesia protested against Ahmadi Muslims. The religious conservatives placed pressure on the government to monitor, and harass the Community. An Ahmadi Muslim mosque was burned. Public opinion in Indonesia is split in three ways on how Ahmadi Muslims should be treated. Some hold the view that it should be banned outright on the basis that it is a 'heretical' and 'deviant' sect, not listed as one of the officially recognised religions in Indonesia; while others hold the view that although it should not be banned because of the guarantee of religious freedom in the constitution, its proselytism under the banner of "Islam" should be curtailed, on the basis that it is misleading. Still others hold the view that the Community should be given total religious freedom based on the constitutional right to freedom of religion.

As a consequence of the upheaval, the curtailment of religious freedom against Ahmadi Muslims was institutionalized following a Join Ministerial Decree. The decree issued by the Minister for Religious Affairs, the Minister of Interior and the Attorney General, curtails proselytizing activities of Ahmadi Muslims. Indonesians, who violate the decree may be subject to up to 5 years of imprisonment. Human rights groups objected to the restrictions on the grounds of religious freedom.

In July 2010, a mob of 200 Indonesians surrounded an Ahmadi mosque in Manislor village in Kuningan district, in the province of West Java. The mob pelted the mosque with stones before being dispersed by the police. In 2011, the sect faced widespread calls for a "total ban" in Indonesia. On February 6, 2011, 1,500 of radical Muslim rioters surrounded an Ahmadi neighbourhood in Cikeusik, Banten province and beat to death 3 Ahmadi Muslims and injuring 5, while several other Ahmadi Muslims managed to evacuate their homes and ran for their life. Footage of the bludgeoning of their naked bodies, while policemen watched on, was posted on YouTube and subsequently broadcast on international media, gaining widespread public attention. Those that managed to escape were pursued by the mob, shouting "kill, kill" whilst throwing rocks at the escaping victims. The Wahid Institute held President Susilo Bambang Yudhoyono responsible for not taking action against interreligious violence: "Violence against Ahmadis is an almost daily occurrence, yet the President does nothing to address this." To the surprise of human rights groups, Judges at Serang District court sentenced an Ahmadi victim to six month imprisonment of the Cikeusik attack, for not obeying the police to "leave the house." In contrast to this, the verdict given to the leading attackers, who murdered 3 Ahmadi Muslims, were given between three and six months. This triggered outcry from human right defenders and the international community including the United States and the European Union.

In early 2013, city officials sealed the Al-Misbah Mosque in Bekasi near Jakarta three times. In April 2014, the Indonesian Ulema Council of Ciamis in West Java asked the local Ahmadiyya community to cease activity at the Khilafat Nur Mosque after police warned from possible attacks following the legislative election. This was rejected by the Ahmadiyya community insisting on the state being responsible for guaranteeing religious freedom for its citizens. The Wahid Institute reaffirmed the Ahmadiyya's stance warning the government not to take the wrong action.

=== Forced segregation ===
In Cisalada, a village south of Jakarta marks a sign which says that it is "forbidden for [an] Ahmadi to use this road," an example of segregation of Ahmadi Muslims from the Muslim majority.

Following multiple deadly attacks on Ahmadis in Cikeusik, Banten province, an Indonesian politician once suggested that Ahmadis should be moved to one of thousands of Indonesia's uninhabited islands, in order to prevent conflicts between Ahmadi Muslims and Muslim conservatives. He stated, "We [can] choose [to place them] on an island so that they will have decent lives."

== See also ==
- Islam in Indonesia
- Christianity in Indonesia
- Persecution of Ahmadis
