= Indonesian Climbing Federation =

- Federasi Panjat Tebing Indonesia
- Abbreviation: FPTI
- Predecessor: Federasi Panjat Tebing dan Gunung Indonesia (FPTGI)
- Headquarters: South Jakarta
- Official language: Indonesian
- Leader: Zannuba Arifah
- Parent organization: National Sports Committee of Indonesia
- Website: www.fpti.or.id

The Indonesian Climbing Federation (Indonesian: Federasi Panjat Tebing Indonesia; abbreviated FPTI) is the national governing body for competition climbing in Indonesia. It is responsible for the administration and development of the sport, the organization of national competitions, and the management of Indonesian teams participating in international climbing events. In 1994, FPTI became the 50th member federation of the Indonesian National Sports Committee.

FPTI oversees national competitions in speed climbing, lead climbing, and bouldering, including the Indonesian national championships and national age-group championships. It also selects and manages Indonesian athletes for Asian and international competitions.

The federation oversees Indonesia's speed-climbing development program. Indonesian climbers have won medals at the Asian Games, World Cup events, world championships, and the Olympic Games. Indonesia won its first Olympic gold medal in sport climbing through Veddriq Leonardo in the men's speed event at the 2024 Summer Olympics.

The federation is led by its president, Zannuba Arifah, popularly known as Yenny Wahid, since 2019. She was also elected deputy chair of the Asian branch of the International Federation of Sport Climbing for the 2025–2027 term.
