= Khaled Kasab Mahameed =

Khaled Kasab Mahameed or Mahmeed is an Israeli Arab attorney who founded the Arab Institute for Holocaust Research and Education and in 2006 was stopped from attending an Iranian conference on the Holocaust because he held an Israeli passport.

== Museum ==
=== Origin and mission ===
Mahameed is the owner of the Arab Institute for Holocaust Research and Education, which he founded in October 2004 or March 2005 in Nazareth after he had taken his two children to see a 20-foot-high wall that Israel had built on some borders of Jerusalem. Time magazine called it an epiphany when Mahameed asked himself, "What would drive the Israelis to do such a thing to us, build such a monstrosity as this wall?" then "gathered his son and daughter and drove them to Yad Vashem", the Holocaust museum in Jerusalem. His reaction: "It was very moving. I couldn't breathe. Six million. It's like something off another planet."

The museum, the first on the Holocaust founded by an Arab, is housed in a portion of Mahameed's legal office. It became more widely known after Mahameed was denied permission to travel to Iran, where he had planned to speak on a conference about the Holocaust.

Mahameed said he had not learned a great deal about the Holocaust in his Arab Israeli school. In Arabic lands, he explained, teachers "would conceal or even deny the genocide". But at the age of six he learned about the event from his father, and later, when grown, he studied in Jerusalem, London and Stockholm, where Jewish classmates told him of the persecution of their parents and grandparents.

Only when we recognize the suffering of others will they begin to understand our suffering.

— Mahameed

His museum, he said, was based on the idea that "the Palestinian people paid the price for the Jewish Holocaust in that they became the refugees and remained without a country. The fact that Jews were murdered in Germany led to Palestinians not having a state". "We have to adopt the Holocaust", he said, as a way for the Arab world to negotiate with Israel "with a shared understanding".

Arieh O'Sullivan, spokesman for the Anti-Defamation League office in Israel, said Mahameed has taken the museum in the wrong direction. "He's saying 'the Holocaust existed, it's a terrible thing, but the Palestinians pay the price of the Holocaust, and Europeans felt guilty about the Holocaust, and they set up this colonial state here.'" That's wrong, O'Sullivan said: "Israel arose not because of the Holocaust but despite the Holocaust".

=== Field trips ===
Mahameed has taken his exhibits on the Holocaust to his fellow Arabs in the Palestinian territories. In 2008 he traveled to Edna, where he faced a "tough crowd" in presenting his message that the Holocaust was "a suffering that nobody, even us Palestinians, can begin to comprehend".

In 2009, he went with his traveling exhibits to the small village of Ni'lin in the West Bank. He told a reporter then that he believes that "U.S.-brokered peace negotiations could fail if Palestinians do not acknowledge the historical trauma so central to the Jewish state". In the room where he showed his exhibit, the Holocaust photos and memorabilia were paired with photos of casualties from the Gaza War in 2008–09. A large banner addressed to German Chancellor Angela Merkel asked, "Why should we Palestinians continue to pay for the Holocaust?" He said he used such images to "make the display more palpable to Palestinians who are grappling with the Holocaust for the first time".

== Conference ==
Mahameed was invited by the Foreign Ministry of Iran to address an international conference called International Conference to Review the Global Vision of the Holocaust, held in Tehran in 2005, but at the last moment he was denied a visa because he lived in Israel. He was "terribly disappointed", observing that "'When you don’t understand the Holocaust, it hinders the peace process. I wanted to go tell the Iranians that when you play down the Holocaust or deny it, you are directly hurting the Palestinian refugees who are in camps. By denying it, they are making the Jewish people feel persecuted — which doesn't allow options for peace to develop".

== Personal ==
Mahameed was born in Israel about 1962 in a family that had lost its home in Lajjun during the 1948 Arab–Israeli War and settled in Umm al-Fahm. At a young age, he started his own legal business, venturing capital through building a network between engineers and construction companies, to raise Arab-Israeli employment rates in the region. He has two sisters and ten brothers. In his teenage years, he attended the Arab Orthodox College in Haifa and Hebrew University of Jerusalem, which he left in 1984 to study business administration in Sweden. Returning to study law remotely from Israel (at the East London University), he was admitted to the bar and set up his office in Nazareth.

Mahameed is married to Ezdehar and they have two children. A German reporter noted that Mahameed "wears elegant patent leather shoes, black pants, a white shirt and a traditional Palestinian headscarf".
