= Yenny Wahid =

Indonesian politician

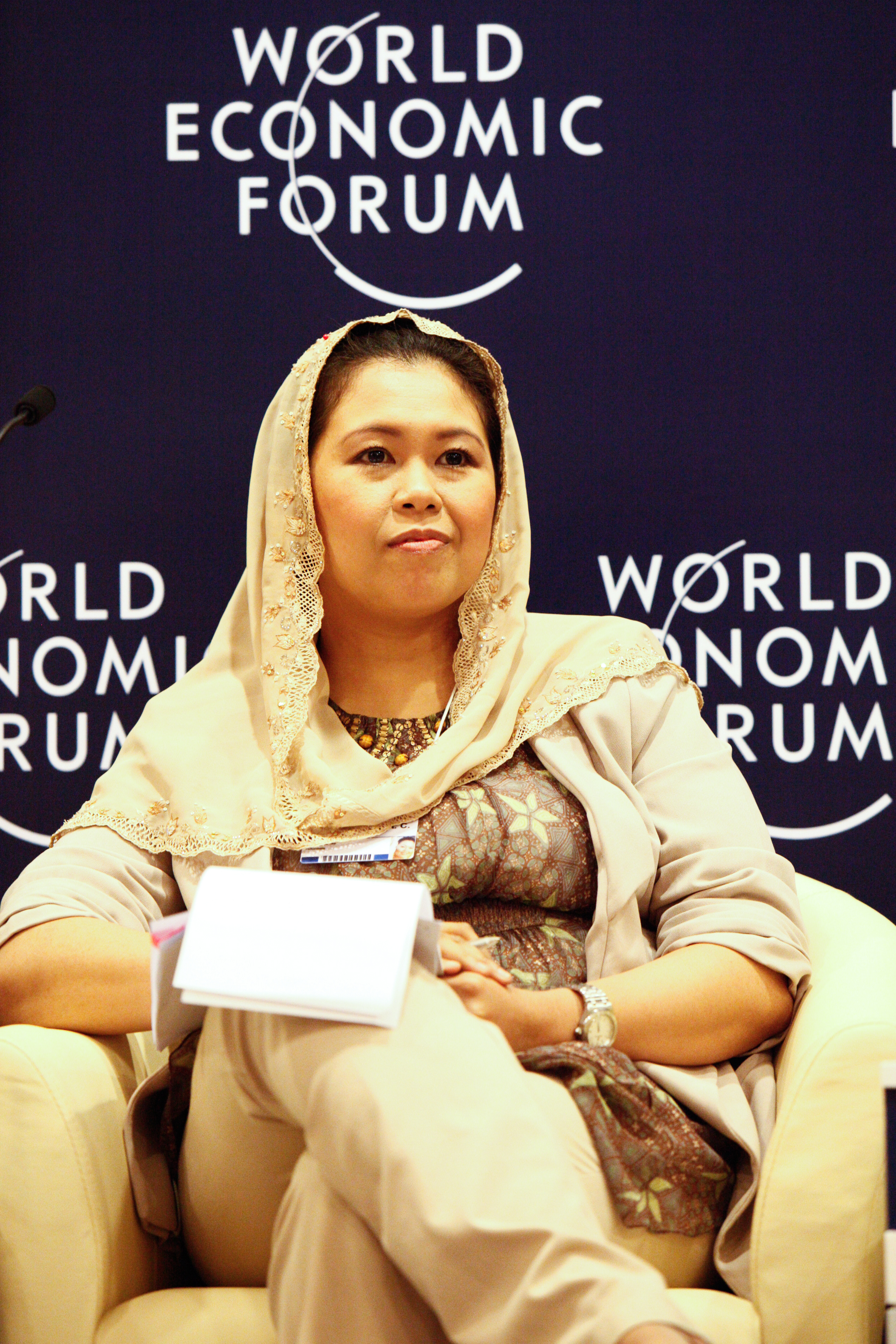
- Wahid in 2011
- Born: Zannuba Ariffah Chafsoh; 29 October 1974 (age 52); Jombang, East Java, Indonesia
- Education: Trisakti University; Harvard Kennedy School
- Occupations: Journalist; political activist
- Organizations: The Wahid Institute
- Political party: Independent (since 2014)
- Other political affiliations: PKB (1998–2008); PKBI (2011); PKBN (2011–2012); PKBIB (2012–2014)
- Spouse: Dhorir Farisi (m. 2009)
- Children: 3
- Parents: Abdurrahman Wahid (father); Sinta Nuriyah (mother)

Zannuba Ariffah Chafsoh, known as Yenny Wahid (born 29 October 1974), is an Indonesian activist, politician, former journalist, and sports administrator. She is the director of the Wahid Foundation, a civil-society organization founded by her father, former Indonesian president Abdurrahman Wahid, that works in peacebuilding, community empowerment, and the prevention of violent extremism. She has served as chair of the Indonesian Climbing Federation since 2019 and as deputy chair of IFSC Asia since 2025.

== Early life and education ==
She is the second daughter of the late President of Indonesia Abdurrahman Wahid, a granddaughter of Indonesia's first religion minister Wahid Hasyim, and a great-granddaughter of Hasyim Asy'ari, founder of the world's largest Muslim organization Nahdatul Ulama. She obtained her bachelor's degree in design and visual communication from Trisakti University in Jakarta.

== Journalism career ==
Upon graduation she went to work as a journalist for Fairfax Media, publisher of Australian newspapers The Sydney Morning Herald and The Age.

As a journalist, she covered news stories from occupied East Timor and Aceh. For her stories in post-referendum East Timor, she and her team won a Walkley Award for journalism.

== Advocacy and political career ==
After her father became Indonesia's fourth president in 1999, Wahid left journalism and joined his presidential staff, working in political communication. Following his impeachment in 2001, she studied public administration at Harvard Kennedy School as a Mason Fellow.

In 2004, Wahid became director of the newly established Wahid Institute, now known as the Wahid Foundation. Through the organization, she has worked on religious tolerance, peacebuilding, women's empowerment, and the prevention of violent extremism.

Wahid served as a member of President Susilo Bambang Yudhoyono's special staff for political communication from 2006 to 2007, leaving the position after one year to concentrate on grassroots work. She also served as secretary-general of the National Awakening Party (PKB), starting from 2005, before being removed from the position in 2008.

== Sport administration ==
Wahid was elected by acclamation as chairperson of the Indonesian Climbing Federation (FPTI) in December 2019 for the 2019–2023 term. She was re-elected in December 2023 for a second term covering 2023–2027. In January 2025, she was elected deputy chair of IFSC Asia for the organization's 2025–2029 board term.

== Recognition ==
Greg Barton in The Australian credits her with having played a crucial role in persuading her father of "the extent of military-backed militia violence in East Timor [...] and the culpability of the Indonesian military leadership". According to the Wahid Institute, the World Economic Forum named her a Young Global Leader in 2009, a role in which she remained active as of 2013. She is married to Dhohir Farisi.
