= Mahmoud Ahmadinejad and Israel =

Iranian president's remarks on Israel

Mahmoud Ahmadinejad was the president of Iran from 3 August 2005 to 3 August 2013, and during that time had repeatedly made contentious speeches and statements against Israel. Ahmadinejad refused to call Israel by name, instead calling it the "Zionist regime". He has called for the "elimination of the Zionist regime". Ahmadinejad took part in a protest called "The World Without Zionism" and has derided Israel on numerous occasions. He has urged regional powers to cut diplomatic and economic ties with Israel and halt oil sales. Tensions have risen over Iran's nuclear program. He has also provided funding, training and arms to Hezbollah and Hamas.

Ahmadinejad's remarks have been criticized by various world bodies and governments, including the United States, Canada, the European Union, and the United Nations.

== Calls for destruction of Israel ==
=== 2005 call to "move" Israel ===
In an interview on Iran's Arabic channel Al-Alam on 8 December 2005, Ahmadinejad said that if Germany and Austria feel responsible for the massacre of Jews during World War II, they should host a state of Israel on their own soil. Speaking at a news conference on the summit sidelines, Ahmadinejad said most Jews in Israel "have no roots in Palestine, but they are holding the destiny of Palestine in their hands and allow themselves to kill the Palestinian people."

"Some European countries insist on saying that during World War II, Hitler burned millions of Jews and put them in concentration camps. Any historian, commentator or scientist who doubts that is taken to prison or gets condemned. Although we don't accept this claim, if we suppose it is true... If the Europeans are honest they should give some of their provinces in Europe – like in Germany, Austria or other countries – to the Zionists and the Zionists can establish their state in Europe. You offer part of Europe and we will support it."

==== International reactions ====
- (Germany) German Chancellor Angela Merkel was said to "condemn Ahmadinejad's words", without specifying which words. And she said: "We shall do everything to make clear that Israel's right to exist is not imperiled in any way".
- (Austria) Austrian Chancellor Wolfgang Schüssel called these remarks "an outrageous gaffe, which I want to repudiate in the sharpest manner".
- (United Kingdom) British Foreign Secretary Jack Straw: "I condemn [the comments] unreservedly. They have no place in civilised political debate".
- (United States) White House spokesman Scott McClellan said Ahmadinejad's comments "further underscore our concerns about the regime" in relation to its "ability to develop nuclear weapons". A U.S. State Department spokesman called some (unspecified) remarks of Ahmadinejad's "baffling and objectionable" and said they "do not inspire hope in anyone of us in the international community that Iran's government is prepared to behave as a responsible member of that community".
- Israeli foreign ministry spokesman Mark Regev said the Iranian president has again ”expressed the most outrageous ideas concerning Jews and Israel". Israel's Foreign Minister Silvan Shalom said that some of these remarks "should awaken all of us in the world, this country [...] will do anything to destroy the state of Israel".
- (United Nations) UN Secretary-General Kofi Annan was "shocked" at some of Ahmadinejad's remarks.

Saudi, Turkish and Iranian officials criticized Ahmadinejad's speech because it "marred a Mecca summit dedicated to showing Islam's moderate face".

=== 2006 International Conference to Review the Global Vision of the Holocaust and surrounding controversies ===
On 11 December 2006, at the International Conference to Review the Global Vision of the Holocaust, a gathering of Holocaust deniers in Tehran, Ahmadinejad said:

"Thanks to people's wishes and God's will the trend for the existence of the Zionist regime is [headed] downwards and this is what God has promised and what all nations want. The Zionist regime will be wiped out soon the same way the Soviet Union was, and humanity will achieve freedom."

=== 2008 ===
On Israel's 60th birthday, Ahmadinejad said:

Those who think they can revive the stinking corpse of the usurping and fake Israeli regime by throwing a birthday party are seriously mistaken. Today the reason for the Zionist regime's existence is questioned, and this regime is on its way to annihilation."

Ahmadinejad also stated that Israel has "reached the end like a dead rat after being slapped by the Lebanese". Later, he said: The Zionist regime is dying, and the criminals imagine that by holding celebrations [...] they can save the Zionist regime from death. Ahmadinejad also stated that: "They should know that regional nations hate this fake and criminal regime and if the smallest and briefest chance is given to regional nations they will destroy [it]."

In his address to the 2008 United Nations General Assembly, Ahmadinejad said that today the Zionist regime is on a definite slope to collapse.

=== 2012 ===
==== July ====
In July 2012, ahead of Quds Day, Ahmadinejad said that "any freedom lover and justice seeker in the world must do its best for the annihilation of the Zionist regime in order to pave the path for the establishment of justice and freedom in the world", and that the ultimate objective of world forces must be the annihilation of the "Zionist regime". Ahmadinejad added that "the Zionist regime is both the symbol of the hegemony of the Zionism over the world and the means in the hand of the oppressor powers for expansion of their hegemony in the region and in the world" and that "liberating Palestine" would solve all of the world's problems. Ahmadinejad also made allegations that Zionists control the world's media and financial systems, and that a "horrible Zionist current" had been managing world affairs for "about 400 years."

==== August ====
In August 2012, at an annual protest against the existence of Israel, Ahmadinejad said that "the very existence of the Zionist regime is an insult to humanity" and that, "the Zionist regime and the Zionists are a cancerous tumor. Even if one cell of them is left in one inch of [Palestinian] land, in the future this story [of Israel's existence] will repeat." Ahmadinejad also said that "the nations of the region will soon finish off the usurper Zionists in the Palestinian land". Ahmadinejad added that "it is dangerous if even 10% of the territory is given to the Zionists." Ahmadinejad also said, "The western powers cannot tolerate criticism of the Zionist regime. They feel compelled to defend it."

===== International reactions =====
United Nations Secretary-General Ban Ki-moon condemned Ahmadinejad's remarks, as well as remarks by Iranian supreme leader Ayatollah Khamenei, which he called "offensive and inflammatory statements." Ban said that the region's leaders should "use their voices at this time to lower, rather than to escalate, tensions."

EU foreign policy chief Catherine Ashton said that she "strongly condemns the outrageous and hateful remarks threatening Israel's existence by the Supreme Leader and the President of the Islamic Republic of Iran." Ashton added that "Israel's right to exist must not be called into question."

United States National Security Council spokesman Tommy Vietor said that if Iran was concerned about human rights, "It should stop supporting Syrian president Bashar al-Assad's brutal assault on the Syrian people" and also that "Iran and Syria's blatant disregard for basic human rights is the real insult to humanity." Vietor condemned "the latest series of offensive and reprehensible comments by senior Iranian officials that are aimed at Israel" as "hateful and divisive rhetoric."

On 7 September 2012, Canada announced it has closed its embassy in Iran and ordered all Iranian diplomats out of Canada within 5 days, due in part to Iran's repeated threats towards Israel and "racist, anti-semitic rhetoric".

=== 2013 ===
==== August ====
On 2 August 2013, while Iranians were commemorating al-Quds Day and his last day in office, Ahmadinejad warned of an impending regional storm that would uproot Israel. He also said that Israel "has no place in the region."

== 2005 Zahedan statement ==
On 14 December 2005, in Zahedan, Iran, Ahmadinejad said:

"People in Palestine are getting killed every day by the new rulers of Palestine. As a consequence of the Holocaust, the Europeans took land from the Palestinians for a Jewish state. I don't care whether the Holocaust took place or not, but it is illogical to give a piece of Palestine for compensation. Some people make an awful fuss about that Holocaust, make a myth of it. [...] Countries that themselves have nuclear, chemical and biological weapons should not raise an outcry when Iran wants access to peaceful nuclear technology."

Ahmadinejad blamed on European nations over the Palestinian problems and also called to move the State of Israel to another country:

If you [Europeans] committed this big crime, then why should the oppressed Palestinian nation pay the price? This is our proposal: give a part of your own land in Europe, the US, Canada or Alaska to them so that the Jews can establish their country.

=== International reactions ===
Israel, the United States, the European Commission, and several European countries reacted with shock and indignation. Israeli foreign ministry spokesman Mark Regev said that the Iranian regime holds a "perverse vision of the world". Germany's foreign minister called Ahmadinejad's remarks "shocking and unacceptable". The White House spokesman said that the comments underline the need to "keep Iran from developing nuclear weapons". A European Commission spokeswoman called the comments "completely unacceptable".

Khaled Meshaal, the leader of the Palestinian militant and political party Hamas, supported Ahmadinejad's stance towards Israel calling Ahmadinejad's remarks "courageous". He has said that "Just as Islamic Iran defends the rights of the Palestinians, we defend the rights of Islamic Iran. We are part of a united front against the enemies of Islam."

=== Iranian reactions ===
Iran's Interior Minister Pourmohammadi said:

Actually the case has been misunderstood. (Ahmadinejad) did not mean to raise this matter. [He] wanted to say that if others harmed the Jewish community and created problems for the Jewish community, they have to pay the price themselves. People like the Palestinian people or other nations should not pay the price (for it).

The head of Iran's Jewish community, Haroun Yashayaei, sent a letter to Ahmadinejad in early 2006 that read: "How is it possible to ignore all of the undeniable evidence existing for the exile and massacre of the Jews in Europe during World War Two? Challenging one of the most obvious and saddening events of 20th-century humanity has created astonishment among the people of the world and spread fear and anxiety among the small Jewish community of Iran."

In February 2006, Mohammad Khatami called the Holocaust a "historic fact".

Khamenei's main advisor in foreign policy, Ali Akbar Velayati, refused to take part in the Holocaust conference. In February 2007, he said that the Holocaust was a genocide and a historical reality.

In 2008, Ahmadinejad's statements on the Holocaust were criticized by cleric Mehdi Karroubi.

== Holocaust denial ==
=== 2006 ===
In August 2006, Deutsche Welle, citing AFP, reported that Ahmadinejad had written a letter to German Chancellor Angela Merkel suggesting that the victorious Allied powers in World War II may have invented the Holocaust to embarrass Germany. "Is it not a reasonable possibility that some countries that had won the war made up this excuse to constantly embarrass the defeated people ... to bar their progress," Ahmadinejad reportedly wrote in the letter. Merkel indicated that she would not formally respond to the letter, saying it contained "totally unacceptable" criticism of Israel and the Jewish state's right to exist.

On 3 August 2006, in a speech during an emergency meeting of Muslim leaders, Ahmadinejad called for "the elimination of the Zionist regime," which was widely interpreted as another threat to destroy Israel.

In a September 2006 interview with NBC Nightly News anchor Brian Williams, Ahmadinejad said that when he called the Holocaust a myth he was merely trying to communicate that it was not just Jews that died, but millions of people and he wants to know why it is the Palestinian people who allegedly have to pay for the Nazis' slaughter of the Jewish people.

In the second World War, over 60 million people lost their lives. They were all human beings. Why is it that only a select group of those who were killed have become so prominent and important? Do you think that the 60 million who lost their lives were all at the result of warfare alone? There were two million that were part of the military at the time, perhaps altogether, 50 million civilians with no roles in the war – Christians, Muslims. They were all killed. The second and more important question that I raised was, if this event happened, and if it is a historical event, then we should allow everyone to research it and study it. The more research and studies are done, the clearer the issue gets. We still leave open to further studies absolute knowledge of science or math. Historical events are always subject to revisions, and reviews and studies. We're still revising our thoughts about what happened over thousands of years ago. Why is it that researchers are jailed? Why is researching this issue prohibited? Whereas we can openly question God, the prophet, concepts such as freedom and democracy? And the third question that I raised in this regard: assuming that this happened, where did it happen? Did the Palestinian people have anything to do with it? Why should the Palestinians pay for it now? Five million displaced Palestinian people is what I'm talking about. Over 60 years of living under terror. Losing the lives of thousands of dear ones. And homes that are destroyed on a daily basis over people's heads. You might argue that the Jews have the right to have a government. We're not against that. But where? At a place where their people were – several people will vote for them, and where they can govern.

==== Holocaust denial conference ====
On 11 December 2006, at the International Conference to Review the Global Vision of the Holocaust, a gathering of Holocaust deniers in Tehran, Ahmadinejad said: "Thanks to people's wishes and God's will the trend for the existence of the Zionist regime is [headed] downwards and this is what God has promised and what all nations want. The Zionist regime will be wiped out soon the same way the Soviet Union was, and humanity will achieve freedom."

===== Reactions =====
- United States — White House condemned the gathering as "an affront to the entire civilized world as well as to the traditional Iranian values of tolerance and respect." The State Department called the conference "just awful."
- United Kingdom — British Prime Minister Tony Blair called the conference "shocking beyond belief" and "a symbol of sectarianism and hatred." Blair added that "I look around the region at the moment, and everything Iran is doing is negative."
- Vatican City — The Vatican released a statement calling the Holocaust an "immense tragedy before which we cannot remain indifferent ... The memory of those horrible events must remain as a warning for people's consciences."
- Germany — German Chancellor Angela Merkel declared, "We reject with all our strength the conference taking place in Iran about the supposed nonexistence of the Holocaust. We absolutely reject this; Germany will never accept this and will act against it with all the means that we have."

=== 2009 ===
At a Holocaust conference at Sharif University of Technology in Tehran on 27 January 2009, Ahmadinejad stated:

For 60 years they allowed no one to question and cast doubt on the logic of the Holocaust and its very essence – because if the truth were to be exposed, nothing would remain of their logic of liberal democracy. It is the very advocates of liberal democracy who defend the Holocaust, who have sanctified it to the point where none may enter. Breaking the padlock of the Holocaust and reexamining it will be tantamount to cutting the vital arteries of the Zionist regime. It will destroy the philosophical foundation and raison d'être of this regime...I invite the dear researchers, intellectuals, young people and students, who are the trailblazers, to reexamine not only the Holocaust, but also its consequences and aftermath and inform others of their studies and research. Let us not forget that more than ever before, the Zionist network, which came up with the issue of the Holocaust, must be exposed, and be presented to the peoples as it really is.

In early June 2009, Ahmadinejad described Israel as "the most criminal regime in human history" and spoke about the "great deception of the Holocaust" in a speech quoted by IRIB.

At the September 2009 Quds Day ceremonies in Tehran, he stated Israel was created on "a lie and a mythical claim," that the Western powers "launched the myth of the Holocaust. They lied, they put on a show and then they support the Jews" – what the New York Times considered "among his harshest statements on the topic," and one immediately condemned by the U.S., UK, French and German governments.

== 2005 Senate resolution ==
In 2005, the U.S. Senate unanimously agreed to a resolution condemning Ahmadinejad's "harmful, destructive, and anti-Semitic statements."

The Iranian government responded that "the Western media empire is trying to portray Iran as an anti-Semitic country". In addition, Mahmoud Ahmadinejad said that "Jews are respected by everyone, by all human beings ... some people think if they accuse me of being anti-Jew they can solve the problem. No, I am not anti-Jew ... I respect them very much ... We love everyone in the world – Jews, Christians, Muslims, non-Muslims, non-Jews, non-Christians".

== January 2006 reaction to Prime Minister Ariel Sharon's stroke ==
On 4 January 2006, Israeli Prime Minister Ariel Sharon suffered a massive haemorrhagic stroke and was reported to be dead or near death. The next day Ahmadinejad told Shi'a clerics in Qom:

Hopefully, the news that the criminal of Sabra and Shatila has joined his ancestors is final.

=== Reactions ===
The United States condemned Ahmadinejad's comment as "hateful and disgusting" and U.S. State Department spokesman Sean McCormack called Ahmadinejad's remarks "part of a continuing stream of hateful invective that has come from this president."

== Reactions to the 2006 Israel-Lebanon conflict ==
On 15 July 2006, Ahmadinejad compared the actions of Israel in launching an offensive against Lebanon to that of Nazi Germany. "Hitler sought pretexts to attack other nations," Ahmadinejad was quoted as saying by the ISNA students news agency at the inauguration of a Tehran road tunnel. "The Zionist regime is seeking baseless pretexts to invade Islamic countries and right now it is justifying its attacks with groundless excuses," he added.

On 3 August 2006, in a speech during an emergency meeting of Muslim leaders, Ahmadinejad called for "the elimination of the Zionist regime," which was widely interpreted as another threat to destroy Israel.

== 2006 statements that "the Israeli government is a fabricated government" and "the solution is democracy" ==
In 2006 Ahmadinejad appeared in an edited interview with CBS' 60 Minutes' Mike Wallace where Ahmadinejad stated "the Israeli government is a fabricated government". However, the full, unedited interview was shown on C-SPAN afterwards, where it was shown that 60 Minutes had cut out Ahmadinejad's peaceful statements that "the solution is democracy," and that Iran wants a "durable peace," and for "the war to come an end" (referring to the Israel-Palestine Conflict). C-SPAN posted a video online of both the edited interview and the full interview.

== Statement at 2008 United Nations Summit on Global Food Security ==
At the United Nations summit on global food security in June 2008, Ahmadinejad stated:

"People like my comments, because people will save themselves from the imposition of the Zionists. European peoples have suffered the greatest damage from Zionists and today the costs of this false regime, be they political or economic costs, are on Europe's shoulders."

Ronald S. Lauder, president of the World Jewish Congress, complained to the United Nations and the Italian government about Ahmadinejad's presence at the conference, stating that "It is deplorable that a leader like him, who is failing both his own people and the international community, is allowed to hijack the agenda of this important FAO conference."

== 2008 UN General Assembly address ==
In an address to the United Nations General Assembly on 23 September 2008, Ahmadinejad stated that Zionists are criminals and murderers, are "acquisitive" and "deceitful", and dominate global finance despite their "minuscule" number. He further stated that "It is deeply disastrous to witness that some presidential nominees have to visit these people [Zionists], take part in their gatherings and swear their allegiance and commitment to their interests in order to win financial or media support. These nations are spending their dignity and resources on the crimes and threats of the Zionist network against their will.”Ahmadinejad stated the "Zionist regime" was on the path to collapse and that the "underhanded actions of the Zionists" as among the causes of the recent unrest in the former Soviet republic of Georgia. In a subsequent interview with the Los Angeles Times, Ahmadinejad stated that "The [Zionist] regime resembles an airplane that has lost its engine and is kind of going down. And no one can help it," he said. "This will benefit everyone". Ahmadinejad's speech was denounced as "blatant anti-Semitism" by German Foreign Minister Frank-Walter Steinmeier.

== 2008 statement that "smaller Israel" is dead ==
In a speech broadcast on IRINN on 18 and 23 September 2008, Ahmadinejad stated, in regard to the idea of Greater Israel being dead, that:

I would like to declare that the idea of "smaller Israel" is also dead. The very notion of Israel is dead, but they are lagging behind the times. Just like the idea of Greater Israel died 30 years ago, and they did not realize this, and have continued to perpetrate crimes for 30 years... Today, I say to them: The idea of smaller Israel is dead.

== Description of Israel as a germ ==
In a public address on IRINN TV on 2 June 2008, Ahmadinejad stated:

The Zionist regime has lost its raison d'être. Today, the Palestinians identify with your name Khomeini, your memory, and in your path. They are walking in your illuminated path and the Zionist regime has reached a total dead end. Thanks to God, your wish will soon be realized, and this germ of corruption will be wiped off.

== Zionists have taken over the world ==
In a speech broadcast on IRINN on 18 and 23 September 2008, Ahmadinejad stated:

The Zionists are crooks. A small handful of Zionists, with a very intricate organization, have taken over the power centers of the world. According to our estimates, the main cadre of the Zionists consists of 2,000 individuals at most, and they have another 8,000 activists. In addition, they have several informants, who spy and provide them with intelligence information. But because of their control of power centers in the U.S. and Europe, and their control of the financial centers and the news and propaganda agencies, they spread propaganda as if they were the entire world, as if all the peoples supported them, and as if they were the majority ruling the world.

At a Holocaust conference at Sharif University of Technology in Tehran on 27 January 2009, Ahmadinejad stated:

"Today the Zionists dominate many of the world's centers of power, wealth, and media. Unfortunately, they have ensnared many politicians and parties, and they are plundering the wealth and assets of nations in this way, depriving peoples of their freedoms and destroying their cultures and human values by spreading their nexus of corruption."

== Statement on Holocaust Remembrance Day ==
At a Holocaust conference at Sharif University of Technology in Tehran on 27 January 2009, Ahmadinejad stated:

The illegitimate Zionist regime is an outcome of the Holocaust... a political and power-seeking network claimed to be the advocate for one group of the victims, and sought reparations for their blood. [This network] ruled that the survivors of this particular group of victims must receive compensation – and part of this compensation was to establish the Zionist regime in the land of Palestine. On this pretext, they attacked Palestine and, after massacring the [indigenous] people and driving them from their homes, they occupied their homeland and created the Zionist regime – in order to ensure that no regional power would emerge in the Islamic lands except for the West, [because] Islamic civilization and culture have the dynamic potential to threaten their interests, which were based on oppression and thirst for power. These principles and philosophy comprise the Zionist regime.

== Description of Zionists as "criminals" and "so-called humans" ==
16 June 2010 Official Iranian Media Translation, unedited, 16 June 2010

"They gathered, organized and armed the dirties[sic], filthiest and most criminal so-called humans from different parts of the world more than 60 years ago under a false and void excuse and through making fake news and stories. They occupied the Palestinian territories and made the Palestinian nation homeless through their military and propaganda supports".

== Statement on Gaza flotilla raid ==
At an Asian security summit in Istanbul, Turkey on 8 June 2010, Ahmadinejad stated that the Israeli raid on a flotilla attempting to break the blockade in Gaza (in which nine people were killed):

showed violence and hatred and war-mongering attitudes. The devilish sound of the uncultured Zionists was coming out from their deceit. ... They were holding up the flag of the devil itself... [The raid] has actually rung the final countdown for its existence. It shows that it has no room in the region and no one is ready to live alongside it. Actually, no country in the world recognizes it, and you know that the Zionist regime is the backbone of the dictatorial world order...The Zionist regime, with what it has done, it actually stopped its possibility to exist in the region anymore.

== 2010 criticism of peace talks with Israel ==
On al-Quds Day in September 2010, Ahmadinejad criticized the Palestinian Authority for agreeing to renew direct peace talks with Israel. He called the talks "stillborn" and "doomed to fail," and urged Palestinians to continue armed resistance. Nabil Abu Rudeineh, a spokesman for the PA, responded that Ahmadinejad "does not represent the Iranian people ... is not entitled to talk about Palestine, or the President of Palestine."

== 2011 comparison of Israel to cancer ==
In May 2011, after a protest over the creation of Israel in 1948, during which 12 Palestinians were killed, Ahmadinejad said on television "... like a cancer cell that spreads through the body, this regime infects any region. It must be removed from the body."

== 2011 comparison of Israel to a transplanted kidney ==
In remarks published in Egypt's Al-Akhbar newspaper in November 2011, Ahmadinejad stated "This entity [Israel] can be compared to a kidney transplanted in a body that rejected it. "Yes it will collapse and its end will be near".

== August 2012 U.N. Secterary General criticism of Ahmadinejad's statements ==
At a meeting with Iranian President Mahmoud Ahmadinejad at the Non-aligned Movement on 29 August 2012, United Nations Secretary-General Ban Ki-moon demanded that Ahmadinejad stop threatening Israel, and that his verbal attacks on Israel were offensive, inflammatory, and unacceptable.

== 2012 UN General Assembly address ==
On 24 September 2012, during the opening week of the United Nations General Assembly, President Mahmoud Ahmadinejad ignored a warning by the United Nations to cease from harsh rhetoric and in reference to the founding of Israel in 1948, stated that Israel did not have any modern roots in the Middle East and would be "eliminated". He claimed that, historically, Israelis were "minimal disturbances that come into the picture and are then eliminated." His comments were condemned by the United States as "disgusting, offensive, and outrageous," and by Israel as proving that Ahmadinejad "not only threatens the future of the Jewish people, he seeks to erase our past. Three thousand years of Jewish history illustrate the clear danger of ignoring fanatics like Iran's president, especially as he inches closer to acquiring nuclear weapons."

In a speech to the United Nations on 26 September 2012, which some media said was notable for having "none of the usual dishevelled extremism" or "sabre rattling" that he is known for, Ahmadinejad called for a new world order not dominated by Western powers and condemned the continual threats of military action against Iran by "uncivilized Zionists." The United States, Israel, and Canada refused to attend during his speech. In response, Israeli Prime Minister Binyamin Netanyahu hinted Israel could strike Iran's nuclear sites and wrote an open letter to the Israeli public before leaving to address the United Nations, promising to deliver a response to Ahmadinejad's speech and Iran's desire to "sentence us to death."

Ahmadinejad's speech was boycotted by the governments of Canada and the United States.

== Controversies ==
=== "Wiped off the map" controversy ===
Ahmadinejad was the subject of controversy in 2005 when one of his statements, given during "The World Without Zionism" conference in Tehran, was translated by the Iranian state-controlled media as suggesting that Israel should be "wiped off the map". The story was picked up by Western news agencies and quickly made headlines around the world. On 30 October, The New York Times published a full transcript of the speech in which Ahmadinejad was translated as having stated:

Our dear Imam (referring to Ayatollah Khomeini) said that the occupying regime must be wiped off the map and this was a very wise statement. We cannot compromise over the issue of Palestine. Is it possible to create a new front in the heart of an old front. This would be a defeat and whoever accepts the legitimacy of this regime has in fact, signed the defeat of the Islamic world. Our dear Imam targeted the heart of the world oppressor in his struggle, meaning the occupying regime. I have no doubt that the new wave that has started in Palestine, and we witness it in the Islamic world too, will eliminate this disgraceful stain from the Islamic world.

The Iranian presidential website stated: "the Zionist Regime of Israel faces a deadend and will under God's grace be wiped off the map," and "the Zionist Regime that is a usurper and illegitimate regime and a cancerous tumor should be wiped off the map."

Iran had used the phrase "Israel must be wiped off the map" previously as well. In 1999, a military parade carried slogans that read "Israel must be wiped off the map" in Farsi and English.

Joshua Teitelbaum of the Jerusalem Center for Public Affairs discovered pictures of Iranian propaganda banners that clearly say in English: "Israel should be wiped out of the face of the world."

In March 2016, Iran tested a ballistic missile painted with the phrase "Israel should be wiped off the Earth" in Hebrew. The missile is reported to be capable of reaching Israel.

==== Translation ====
The "wiped off the map" translation originated from the state-controlled Islamic Republic News Agency. This translation's use in the media has been criticized. Arash Norouzi, artist and co-founder of The Mossadegh Project, said that the statement "wiped off the map" did not exist in the original speech and that Ahmadinejad directed his comment toward the "regime occupying Jerusalem". Norouzi's translation of the Persian quote reads; "the Imam said this regime occupying Jerusalem must vanish from the page of time." Juan Cole, historian of the Middle East and South Asia, concurred, writing that Ahmadinejad's statement should be translated as, "the Imam said that this regime occupying Jerusalem (een rezhim-e eshghalgar-e qods, Persian: این رژیم اشغالگر قدس) must [vanish from] the page of time (bayad az safheh-ye ruzgar mahv shavad, Persian: باید از صفحه روزگار محو شود)," noting that there is no Persian idiom to wipe something off the map. The key phrase here Safheh-ye ruzgar (pages of time/of history) was itself a slight variation on Ayatollah Khomeini's words, which Ahmadinejad was quoting, the Ayatollah having spoken of sahneh ruzgar (scene of time). In both cases, the allusion is to time, not to a place. No one noted the slight variation or context and the incorrect interpretation it referred to the destruction of Israel was maintained. Shiraz Dossa, a professor of Political Science at St. Francis Xavier University in Nova Scotia, Canada, also described the text as a mistranslation.

Ahmadinejad was quoting the Ayatollah Khomeini in the specific speech under discussion: what he said was that "the occupation regime over Jerusalem should vanish from the page of time." No state action is envisaged in this lament; it denotes a spiritual wish, whereas the erroneous translation – "wipe Israel off the map" – suggests a military threat. There is a huge chasm between the correct and the incorrect translations. The notion that Iran can "wipe out" U.S.-backed, nuclear-armed Israel is ludicrous.

The Guardian columnist and foreign correspondent Jonathan Steele published an article based on this line of reasoning. In an in-depth study of Iranian attitudes to Jews and the state of Israel, Hamburg professor of Islamic studies, Katajun Amirpur has argued that, in context, Ahmadinejad had been quoting Ayatollah Khomeini's words about the imminent appearance of the Soviet Union and the Shah's regime, and had tacked on his remarks concerning Israel. It follows, in her view, that the text could not imply any intention to destroy Israel or annihilate the Jewish people, since Khomeini's quoted statement preceding it prophesied that the Soviet Union and the Shah's regime would disappear, not that the Russian or Iranian people would thereby be extinguished.

In an 11 June 2006 analysis of the translation controversy, New York Times editor Ethan Bronner stated:

[T]ranslators in Tehran who work for the president's office and the foreign ministry disagree with them. All official translations of Mr. Ahmadinejad's statement, including a description of it on his website, refer to wiping Israel away. Sohrab Mahdavi, one of Iran's most prominent translators, and Siamak Namazi, managing director of a Tehran consulting firm, who is bilingual, both say "wipe off" or "wipe away" is more accurate than "vanish" because the Persian verb is active and transitive.

Bronner continued: "...it is hard to argue that, from Israel's point of view, Mr. Ahmadinejad poses no threat. Still, it is true that he has never specifically threatened war against Israel. So did Iran's president call for Israel to be 'wiped off the map'? It certainly seems so. Did that amount to a call for war? That remains an open question."

Iranian government sources denied that Ahmadinejad issued any sort of threat. On 20 February 2006, Iran's foreign minister Manouchehr Mottaki told a news conference: "How is it possible to remove a country from the map? He is talking about the regime. We do not recognize this regime legally." Ahmadinejad himself stated that Iran is not a threat to any country, including Israel.

At a gathering of foreign guests marking the 19th anniversary of the death of Ayatollah Ruhollah Khomeini in 2008, Ahmadinejad said:

"You should know that the criminal and terrorist Zionist regime which has 60 years of plundering, aggression and crimes in its file has reached the end of its work and will soon disappear off the geographical scene."

==== Later comments ====
At a news conference on 14 January 2006, Ahmadinejad stated his speech had been exaggerated and misinterpreted. "There is no new policy, they created a lot of hue and cry over that. It is clear what we say: Let the Palestinians participate in free elections and they will say what they want." Speaking at a D-8 summit meeting in July 2008, he denied that his country would ever instigate military action. Instead he claimed that "the Zionist regime" in Israel would eventually collapse on its own.

Asked if he objected to the government of Israel or Jewish people, he said that "creating an objection against the Zionists doesn't mean that there are objections against the Jewish". He added that Jews lived in Iran and were represented in the country's parliament.

Ahmadinejad said that the issue with Palestine would be over "the day that all refugees return to their homes [and] a democratic government elected by the people comes to power", and denounced attempts to normalise relations with Israel, condemning all Muslim leaders who accept the existence of Israel as "acknowledging a surrender and defeat of the Islamic world."

In a September 2008 interview Ahmadinejad was asked: "If the Palestinian leaders agree to a two-state solution, could Iran live with an Israeli state?" He replied:

If they [the Palestinians] want to keep the Zionists, they can stay ... Whatever the people decide, we will respect it. I mean, it's very much in correspondence with our proposal to allow Palestinian people to decide through free referendums.

Interviewer Juan Gonzalez called the reply "a tiny opening". Another observer however dubbed it an "astonishing" admission "that Iran might agree to the existence of the state of Israel," and a "softening" of Ahmadinejad's "long-standing, point-blank anti-Israeli stance". Australian-born British human rights activist Peter Tatchell asked whether the statement reflected opportunism on Ahmadinejad's part, or an openness by Iran "to options more moderate than his reported remarks about wiping the Israeli state off the map."

==== Interpretation as call for genocide ====
The speech was interpreted by some as incitement to genocide. Canada's then Prime Minister Paul Martin said, "this threat to Israel's existence, this call for genocide coupled with Iran's obvious nuclear ambitions is a matter that the world cannot ignore." In 2007, more than one hundred members of the United States House of Representatives co-sponsored a bill "Calling on the United Nations Security Council to charge Ahmadinejad with violating the 1948 Convention on the Prevention and Punishment of the Crime of Genocide and the United Nations Charter because of his calls for the destruction of the State of Israel."

Genocide scholar and former International Criminal Tribunal for Rwanda prosecutor Gregory Gordon considers Ahmadinejad's comments to be incitement to genocide. According to Gordon, the statement is a relatively rare example of direct advocacy of genocide. Ahmedinejad's call to "wipe Israel off the map" is cited in Irwin Cotler's petition "The Danger of a Nuclear, Genocidal and Rights-Violating Iran: The Responsibility to Prevent", which was signed by Elie Wiesel, Former UN High Commissioner for Human Rights Louise Arbour, and the former Swedish Deputy Prime Minister Per Ahlmark. Alan Dershowitz has also accused Mahmoud Ahmedinejad of incitement to genocide. Antisemitism scholar Robert Wistrich compared to Hitler's prophecy of 30 January 1939, in which Adolf Hitler predicted "the annihilation of the Jewish race in Europe" in the event of war. In Wistrich's opinion, "the same genocidal intent is plainly there".

Gawdat Bahgat, a professor of political science at Indiana University of Pennsylvania, said: "The fiery calls to destroy Israel are meant to mobilize domestic and regional constituencies. Iran has no plan to attack Israel with its [Israel's] nuclear arsenal and powerful conventional military capabilities. Supreme Leader Ayatollah Ali Khameni summed up his country's stand on the Arab-Israeli conflict by stressing, '[The] Palestine issue is not Iran's jihad.'" In fact, Bahgat says that according to most analysts a military confrontation between Iran and Israel is unlikely.

Ahmadinejad gave the examples of Iran under the Shah, the Soviet Union and Saddam Hussein's regime in Iraq as examples of apparently invincible regimes that ceased to exist, using them to justify his belief that the United States and the State of Israel can also be defeated: "They say it is not possible to have a world without the United States and Zionism. But you know that this is a possible goal and slogan."

==== Interpretation as call for referendum ====
Ahmadinejad has repeatedly called for a referendum in Palestine. Most recently in an interview with Time magazine in 2006:

TIME: You have been quoted as saying Israel should be wiped off the map. Was that merely rhetoric, or do you mean it? Ahmadinejad: [...] Our suggestion is that the 5 million Palestinian refugees come back to their homes, and then the entire people on those lands hold a referendum and choose their own system of government. This is a democratic and popular way.

On 26 September 2012, in an interview with Charlie Rose, he strongly denied that Iran has ever threatened Israel:

CBS: "When have we threatened to attack the Zionists? We have never threatened them,"

He explained that the "wiped off" the map comments as a call for an end to occupation through a referendum by the Palestinians:

CBS: "And let me explain ... We say that occupation should be done away with. War-like behavior should be done away with. Terrorism should be done away with. The killing of women and children should be done away with. Has the Zionist regime done anything other than this during the last 65 years? No, they haven't .. We say do away with these things. And we have also suggested the solution. We have said the solution is that the Palestinian people should decide in a free election for their own country, their own land,"

==== International reaction ====
The White House stated that Ahmadinejad's rhetoric showed that it was correct in trying to halt Iran's nuclear program. United Nations Secretary-General Kofi Annan said he was dismayed by the comments, and reiterated Iran's obligations and Israel's right of existence under the UN Charter.

EU leaders issued a strong condemnation of these remarks: "[c]alls for violence, and for the destruction of any state, are manifestly inconsistent with any claim to be a mature and responsible member of the international community." On 17 November, the European Parliament adopted a resolution condemning Ahmadinejad's remarks and called on him to retract his bellicose comments in their entirety and to recognise the state of Israel and its right to live in peace and safety. Then Prime Minister of Canada Paul Martin also condemned the comments on several occasions.

On 20 June 2007, the United States House of Representatives called upon United Nations Security Council to charge Iranian President Mahmoud Ahmadinejad with violating the 1948 Convention on Genocide and the United Nations Charter. Congressman Dennis Kucinich attempted to include in the Congressional record independent translations of the speech from The New York Times and the Middle East Media Research Institute that translated the phrase as "the regime occupying Jerusalem must vanish from the page of time" saying "The resolution passed by the House today sets a dangerous precedent in foreign affairs. A mistranslation could become a cause of war. The United States House may unwittingly be setting the stage for a war with Iran". Members of the House objected and inclusion of the independent translations were blocked.

In July 2008, British Prime Minister, Gordon Brown, told the Knesset: "To those who believe that threatening statements fall upon indifferent ears we say in one voice – it is totally abhorrent for the president of Iran to call for Israel to be wiped from the map of the world."

==== Israeli reaction ====
The day after Ahmadinejad's remarks, Israeli Prime Minister Ariel Sharon called for Iran to be expelled from the United Nations and Israel's Foreign Minister Silvan Shalom called for an emergency meeting of the UN Security Council. In that meeting, all fifteen members condemned Ahmadinejad's remarks.

On 8 May 2006, Shimon Peres told Reuters that "the president of Iran should remember that Iran can also be wiped off the map."

==== Palestinian reaction ====
Saeb Erekat, member of the Palestinian Legislative Council, stated: "Palestinians recognise the right of the state of Israel to exist and I reject his comments. What we need to be talking about is adding the state of Palestine to the map, and not wiping Israel from the map."

==== Iranian reaction ====
Iranian Ambassador to the European Union Ali Ahani called the response in Europe "unrealistic and premature," complaining about the discriminatory treatment of the international community, which Iran feels has continued to ignore the threats of Israel and its "organized campaign to provoke others into attacking Iran's facilities and infrastructure", referring to Israel's support of an American attack on Iran. Hassan Hanizadeh, an editorialist for the Tehran Times, claimed that the criticism of Ahmadinejad's statement by the United States and other Western countries is an attempt to divert attention from "the ever-increasing crimes the Zionists are committing against the innocent Palestinians."

Former president of Iran, Mohamed Khatami, stated "those words have created hundreds of political and economic problems for us in the world." Others in Iran have said that there is nothing new about his statements and that the West has overreacted in order to try to smear Iran's international image.

== See also ==
- Iran–Israel relations
- Destruction of Israel in Iranian policy
- History of the Jews in Iran
- International Conference to Review the Global Vision of the Holocaust
- International Holocaust Cartoon Competition
- Jews of Iran
- Persian Jews
- Shiraz blood libel
- Calls for the destruction of Israel
- The Zionist regime
