= The Wahid Institute =

Islamic organization based in Jakarta, Indonesia

The WAHID Institute
- Formation: 7 September 2004
- Headquarters: Jakarta, Indonesia
- Official language: English, Indonesian
- Director: Yenny Zannuba Wahid
- Website: www.wahidinstitute.org

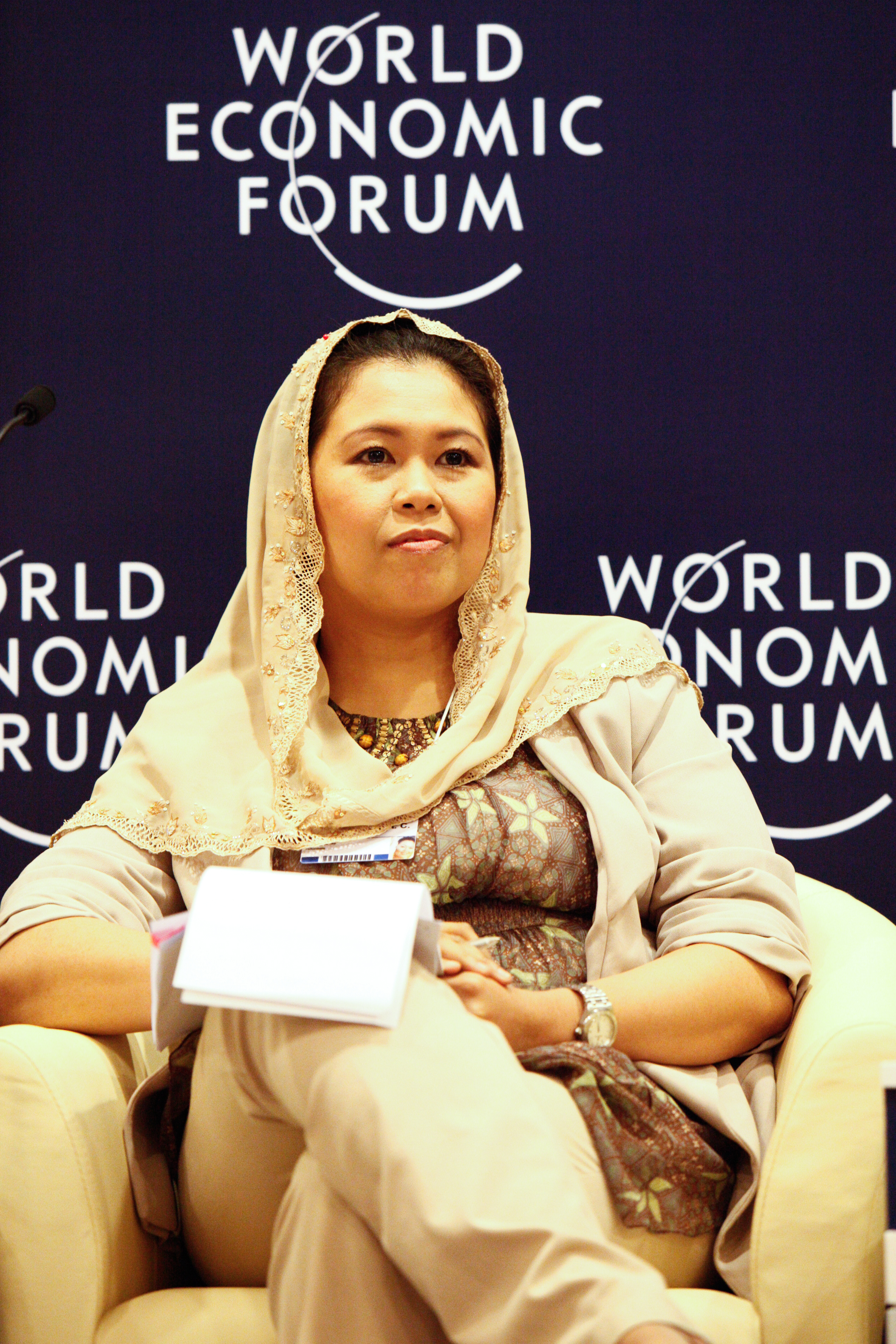
Yenny Wahid representing the Institute at the 2011 East Asia World Economic Forum

The Wahid Institute is a Research Center on Islam, based in Jakarta, Indonesia. It was founded in 2004 by the former President of Indonesia, Abdurrahman Wahid and is led by his daughter Yenny Zannuba Wahid.

It is dedicated to "the development of both Indonesian as well as Islamic society, improving the welfare of lower class of the society, building democracy and fundamental justice, and expanding peace and non-violence throughout the world."

== Formation ==
The Institute was founded on September 7, 2004 at the Four Seasons Hotel in Jakarta. Yenny Zannuba Wahid was appointed director of the Institute. She later stated the institute was established because our “current world situation which is haunted by violence and raising threat of terrorism, for whatever reason, has forced us to take cooperative action in the form inter-religious, nation and ethnic dialog.”

== Bali Holocaust Conference ==
On 12 June 2007, the Wahid Institute together with the US-based Simon Wiesenthal Center and the Libforall Foundation sponsored a conference on the Holocaust, to counter the Iranian International Conference to Review the Global Vision of the Holocaust and to promote interreligious peace. The conference took place in Jimbaran, the location of the 2005 Bali bombings perpetrated by the Islamist group Jemaah Islamiyah.

== Freedom of religion in Indonesia ==
The Institute has been committed for promoting freedom of religion in Indonesia. It annually documents cases of religious intolerance by authorities. In the last years it especially expressed worries about intimidation and violence against Ahmadiyya. In 2011, the Institute blamed President Susilo Bambang Yudhoyono for not taking action: "Violence against Ahmadis is an almost daily occurrence, yet the President does nothing to address this"
