= Le Theil =

Le Theil may refer to several communes in France:

- Le Theil, Allier, in the Allier département
- Le Theil, Manche, in the Manche département
- Le Theil, Orne, in the Orne département
- Le Theil-Bocage, in the Calvados département
- Le Theil-de-Bretagne, in the Ille-et-Vilaine département
- Le Theil-en-Auge, in the Calvados département
- Le Theil-Nolent, in the Eure département

== See also ==
- Theil-Rabier, in the Charente département
- Theil-sur-Vanne, in the Yonne département
- Le Teil, in the Ardèche département
