= Daniel Landes =

American rabbi

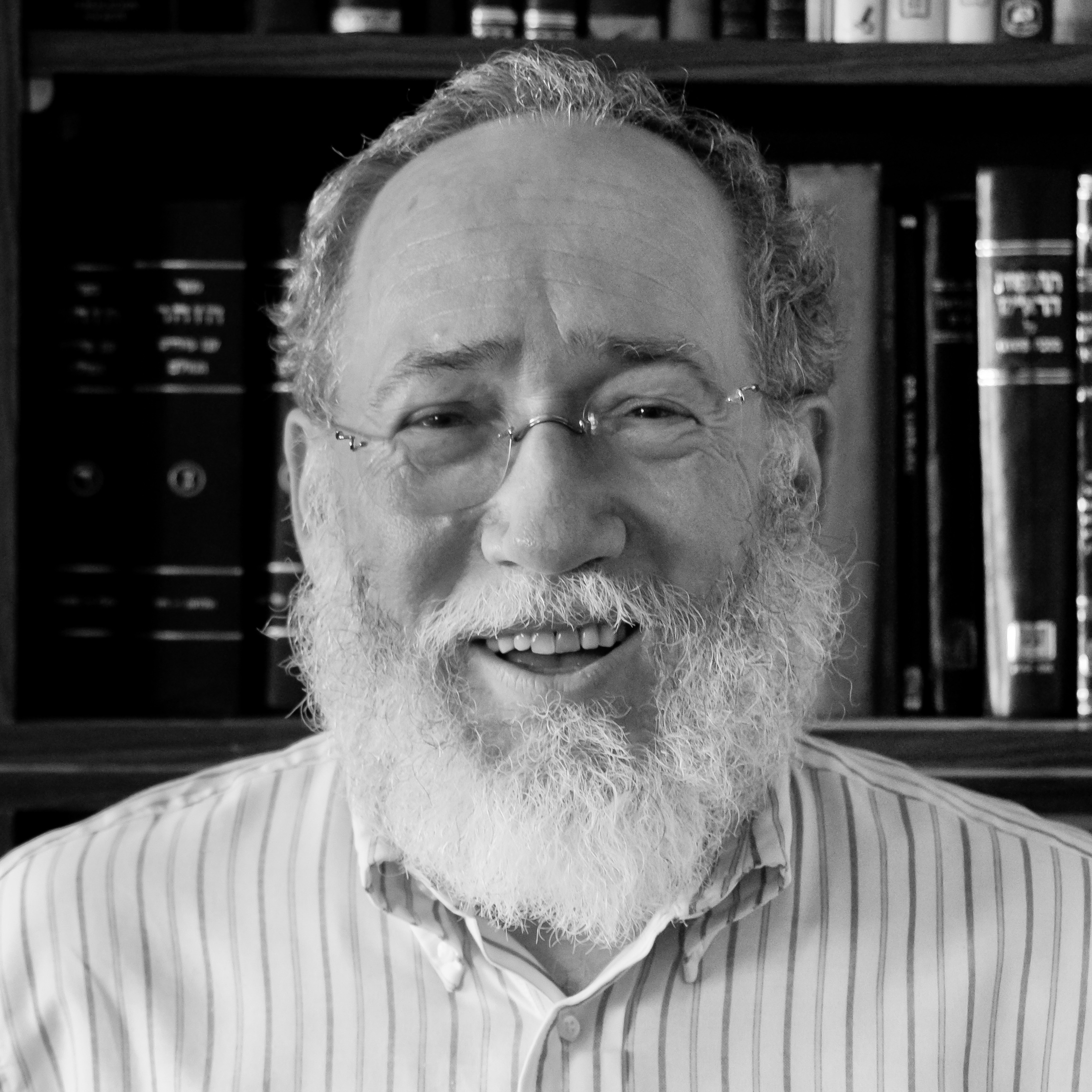
- Rabbi Daniel Landes
- Born: Chicago, Illinois, U.S.
- Occupations: Rabbi, educator, author
- Employer(s): Pardes Institute of Jewish Studies (former), YASHRUT (founder and director)
- Known for: Director of Pardes Institute of Jewish Studies, founder of YASHRUT, ordaining first openly gay Orthodox rabbi
- Notable work: Genocide: Critical Issues/The Holocaust (co-editor), Confronting Omnicide: Jewish Reflections on Weapons of Mass Destruction (editor), My People's Prayer Book (Jewish Law commentary)
- Spouse: Sheryl Robbin

Daniel Landes is the former director of the Pardes Institute of Jewish Studies in Jerusalem and New York City.

== Biography ==
Born in Chicago, Landes studied in Chicago with Rabbi M.B. Sacks, the Menachem Tzion; in Israel with Reb Aryeh Levin, Zvi Yehuda Kook, and the chief rabbi, R. Avraham Shapira; in New York with Rabbi Joseph B. Soloveitchik; and in Los Angeles with Din R. Shmuel Katz (on whose rabbinical court he served).

Landes was a founding faculty member of The Simon Wiesenthal Center in Los Angeles (director of education) and of Yeshiva of Los Angeles (The Van Lennop Chair of Social Ethics). He was also an adjunct associate professor of law at Loyola Law School. Landes taught for the Wexner Foundation for over 20 years.

Landes came to Pardes in 1995 as director and has been active in creation of advanced Talmud classes, Bekiut Talmud, the Fellows, PEP, the Kollel, the Executive Seminar Programs, the annual Blaustein and Brettler Scholar Series, Pardes USA and strengthening of the Pardes Beit Midrash. Landes was the first rabbi to be invited by Indonesia to speak publicly (at the Forum of Religions).

Pardes announced in July 2016, that "[a]fter 21 years of dedicated service to Pardes, Rabbi Daniel Landes will be leaving at the end of the summer."

Landes is director of YASHRUT, having founded the institute in 2018 to build civil discourse through a theology of integrity, justice, and tolerance. YASHRUT includes a semikhah initiative as well as programs for rabbinic leaders. Landes has ordained forty-three rabbis during his career, seven of which received semikhah from Landes under the auspices of YASHRUT in 2019.

In 2019 in Jerusalem, Landes ordained Daniel Atwood; Atwood thus became the first openly gay person to be ordained as an Orthodox rabbi.

== Publications ==
Landes and his wife Sheryl Robbin, a social worker and author, write on Biblical and ethical issues.

- Co-editor with Alex Grobman of Genocide: Critical Issues/ The Holocaust
- Editor of Confronting Omnicide: Jewish Reflections of Weapons of Mass Destruction
- Jewish Law commentator for the ten-volume interdenominational work My People’s Prayer Book (recipient of the National Jewish Book Award)
- Published articles in Tikkun and Jewish Review of Books, as well as other magazines, journals and newspapers.
