= Franz Magnis-Suseno =

Indonesian Jesuit priest

The Reverend Franz Magnis-Suseno SJ
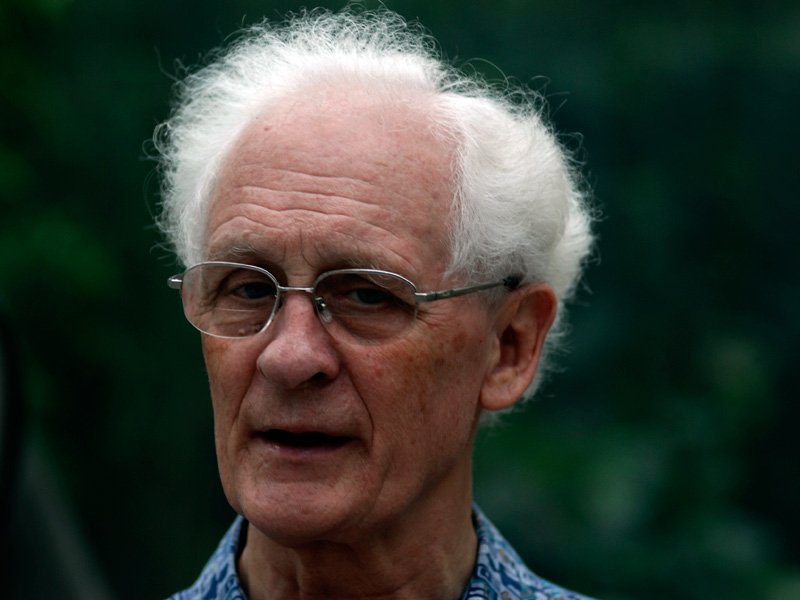
- Franz Magnis-Suseno

Orders
- Ordination: 31 July 1967 (58 years, 306 days)

Personal details
- Born: Maria Franz Anton Valerian Benedictus Ferdinand von Magnis; 26 May 1936 (age 90) Nuremberg, Bavaria, German Reich

Franz Magnis Suseno, S.J., or Maria Franz Anton Valerian Benedictus Ferdinand von Magnis (born 26 May 1936) is an Indonesian Jesuit priest and philosopher.

== Biography ==
Father Franz Magnis-Suseno SJ, a Jesuit priest, is professor emeritus at Driyarkara School of Philosophy in Jakarta, its former rector for 11 years. Born 1936 in Nuremberg, Bavaria, and was originally called Graf Franz Ferdinand von Magnis. He has lived in Indonesia since 1961 and in 1977 became an Indonesian citizen, taking the name of Franz Magnis-Suseno. He studied philosophy, theology and political science at Munich School of Philosophy in Pullach, Gadjah Mada University in Yogyakarta, and LMU Munich, 1973 he got a doctorate in philosophy from LMU Munich. For many years, he lectured also at Jakarta's University of Indonesia and at Parahyangan Catholic University in Bandung. He has been guest lecturer at several places in Europe. In 2002, he received an honorary doctorate in theology from the University of Lucerne. He has published mainly in the field of ethics, political philosophy, Javanese worldview and philosophy of God, mostly in Indonesian language. In 2001 he received the Great Cross of the Order of Merit of the Federal Republic of Germany. In 2007, he turned down the Bakrie Award because of the Sidoarjo mud flow. He received a Habibie award for interfaith dialogue and in 2015 the Mahaputera Utama award.
