= Georges Theil =

French politician (born 1940)

Georges Theil (born 1940 in Corrèze), also known as Gilbert Dubreuil, is a French politician. He is a member of the National Front and was repeatedly condemned for Holocaust denial.
