= Mahmoud Ahmadinejad =

President of Iran from 2005 to 2013

- محمود احمدی‌نژاد
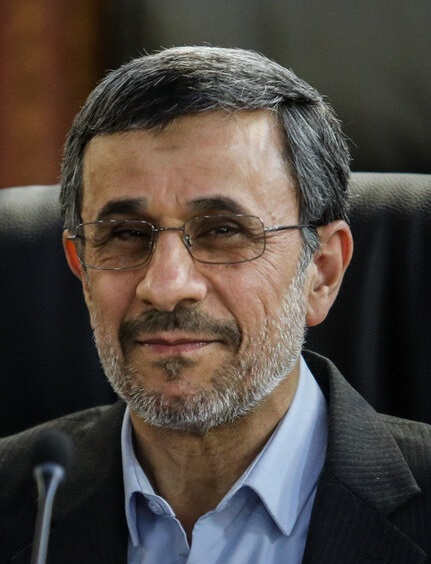
- Ahmadinejad in 2019

President of Iran
- In office 3 August 2005 – 3 August 2013
- Supreme Leader: Ali Khamenei
- Vice President: Mohammad Reza Aref; Parviz Davoodi; Esfandiar Rahim Mashaei; Mohammad Reza Rahimi
- Preceded by: Mohammad Khatami
- Succeeded by: Hassan Rouhani
Acting ministerial offices
Acting Minister of Petroleum
In office 16 May 2011 – 2 June 2011
President	Himself
Preceded by	Masoud Mir-Kazemi
Succeeded by	Mohammad Aliabadi (acting)
Acting Minister of Intelligence
In office 25 July 2009 – 3 September 2009
President	Himself
Preceded by	Gholam-Hossein Mohseni-Eje'i
Succeeded by	Heydar Moslehi

Mayor of Tehran
- In office 20 May 2003 – 28 June 2005
- Preceded by: Mohammad-Hossein Moghimi (acting)
- Succeeded by: Ali Saeedlou (acting)

1st Governor General of Ardabil
- In office 28 November 1993 – 29 October 1997
- President: Akbar Hashemi Rafsanjani
- Preceded by: Province created
- Succeeded by: Seyyed Hamid Tahayi

Member of the Expediency Discernment Council
- Incumbent
- Assumed office 3 August 2013
- Appointed by: Ali Khamenei
- Chairman: Akbar Hashemi Rafsanjani; Ali Movahedi-Kermani (acting); Mahmoud Hashemi Shahroudi; Sadeq Larijani
- Preceded by: Hassan Rouhani

Secretary-General of the Non-Aligned Movement
- In office 30 August 2012 – 3 August 2013
- Preceded by: Mohamed Morsi
- Succeeded by: Hassan Rouhani

Personal details
- Born: Mahmoud Sabbaghian; 28 October 1956 (age 70) Aradan, Imperial State of Iran
- Party: Society of Devotees (1999–2011); Islamic Society of Engineers (1988–present; inactive since 2005); Dolate Bahar
- Other political affiliations: Alliance of Builders (2003–2005); Office for Strengthening Unity (1979–1980)
- Spouse: Azam al-Sadat Farahi (m. 1980)
- Children: 3
- Relatives: Davoud Ahmadinejad (brother); Parvin Ahmadinejad (sister)
- Education: Iran University of Science and Technology (BS, PhD)

Military service
- Allegiance: Iran
- Branch/service: Islamic Revolutionary Guard Corps
- Years of service: 1986–1988
- Rank: None (Note: At the time, Revolutionary Guards rejected official ranks for its members and commanders were simply referred to with honorifics such as "brother" or "pasdar" (guard).)
- Unit: Hamzeh Headquarters
- Commands: Combat engineering Unit, 6th Special Division
- Battles/wars: Iran–Iraq War; Operation Fath 1

Academic background
- Theses: Study of comprehensive transportation plan in Kurdistan (1988); Assessment of subway for passengers transportation (A case study of Tehran) (1997)
- Doctoral advisor: Hamid Behbahani
- Other advisors: Ali Mansour Khaki; Gholamreza Shirazian; Jalil Shahi

Academic work
- Discipline: Civil engineering
- Sub-discipline: Traffic engineering
- Institutions: Iran University of Science and Technology

Mahmoud Ahmadinejad (Note: /mɑːhˈmuːd ɑːmɑːdiːniːˈʒɑːd/ mah-MOOD ah-mah-dee-nee-ZHAHD; Persian: محمود احمدی‌نژاد, romanized: Mahmud Ahmadinezhâd, pronounced [mæhˈmuːd(e) ʔæhmæˌdiːneˈʒɒːd]. (Note: The [e] is the ezafe, which is a grammatical marker linking two words together. It is not indicated in writing, and is not part of the name itself, but is pronounced in Persian language when a first and last name are used together.)) (né Sabbaghian; (Note: Persian: محمود صباغیان, romanized: Mahmud Sabbâghiyân, pronounced [mæhˈmuːd(e) sæbɒːɢiːˈjɒːn].) born 28 October 1956) is an Iranian politician who served as the president of Iran from 2005 to 2013. Ideologically a principlist and nationalist, he was a member of the Expediency Discernment Council. He was also the main political leader of the Alliance of Builders of Islamic Iran, a coalition of conservative political groups in the country, and served as the mayor of Tehran from 2003 to 2005, reversing many of his predecessor's reforms.

An engineer and teacher from a poor family, he was ideologically shaped by thinkers such as Navvab Safavi, Jalal Al-e-Ahmad, and Ahmad Fardid. After the Iranian Revolution, Ahmadinejad joined the Office for Strengthening Unity. Appointed a provincial governor in 1993, he was replaced along with all other provincial governors in 1997 after the election of President Mohammad Khatami and returned to teaching. Tehran's council elected him mayor in 2003. He took a religious hard line, reversing reforms of previous moderate mayors. His 2005 presidential campaign, supported by the Alliance of Builders of Islamic Iran, garnered 62% of the runoff election votes, and he became president on 3 August 2005.

During his presidency, Ahmadinejad was a controversial figure both in Iran and worldwide. He was criticized domestically for his economic policies, and was accused of disregard for human rights by organizations in North America and Europe. Outside of Iran, he was criticized for his hostility towards Israel, Saudi Arabia, the United Kingdom, the United States and other Western and Arab states. In 2007, Ahmadinejad introduced a gasoline rationing plan to reduce the country's fuel consumption and cut the interest rates that private and public banking facilities could charge. His election to a second term in 2009 was widely disputed, and led to widespread protests domestically and criticism from Western countries. He repeatedly called for the destruction of Israel. He also declared the Holocaust to be a myth, later claiming that promoting Holocaust denial was one of the major achievements of his presidency. He was a strong proponent of Iran's nuclear program.

During his second term, Ahmadinejad experienced a power struggle with reformers and other traditionalists in Parliament and the Revolutionary Guard, as well as with Supreme Leader Ali Khamenei, over his dismissal of intelligence minister Gholam-Hossein Mohseni-Eje'i and his support for his controversial close adviser, Esfandiar Rahim Mashaei. On 14 March 2012, Ahmadinejad became the first president of the Islamic Republic of Iran to be summoned by the Islamic Consultative Assembly (parliament) to answer questions regarding his presidency. Limited to two terms under the current Iranian constitution, Ahmadinejad supported Mashaei's campaign for president. In 2013, Hassan Rouhani was elected as Ahmadinejad's successor.

On 12 April 2017, Ahmadinejad announced that he intended to run for a third term in the 2017 presidential election, against the objections of Supreme Leader Khamenei. His nomination was rejected by the Guardian Council. During the 2017–18 Iranian protests, Ahmadinejad criticized the current government of Iran. He made additional attempts at registering to run for the 2021 presidential election and 2024 Iranian presidential election, but his nominations were rejected.

In July 2026, it was reported that the Central Intelligence Agency and Mossad initially planned to re-install Ahmadinejad as Iranian president as part of regime change Operations Epic Fury and Roaring Lion, which has since fallen through.

== Early life and education ==
Mahmoud Ahmadinejad was born on 28 October 1956 in the village of Aradan, near Garmsar, Semnan province, Pahlavi Iran into an ethnic Persian family. His mother, Khanom, was a Sayyida, an honorific title given to those believed to be direct bloodline descendants of the Islamic prophet Muhammad. His father, Ahmad, was a Persian grocer and barber, and was a religious Shia Muslim who taught the Quran.

When Mahmoud was one year old, his family moved to Tehran. Mahmoud's father changed their family name from "Saborjhian" or "Sabbaghian" (Persian: صباغیان) (Note: Kasra Naji says that the name was 'Sabaghian,' which means 'dye-masters' in Persian.) to Ahmadinejad after the Iranian Revolution, because he disliked it. Sabor is Persian for thread-painter, (Note: In 2009, some media reports claimed that Sabourjian is a common Iranian Jewish name, and that Sabor is the name for the Jewish tallit (prayer shawl) in Persia. Meir Javedanfar, a blogger at The Guardian, disputed this claim, citing experts.) a once common occupation within the Semnan carpet industry. Ahmadinejad is a composite of Ahmadi and Nejad. Ahmad was his father's name. The suffix Nejad in Persian means race, therefore the term Ahmadi Nejad means "the lineage of Ahmad". According to the interviews with the relatives of Ahmadi Nejad, his father, at that point working as a shopkeeper, sold his house in Tehran and bought a smaller house, giving the excess funds to charity and poor people.

In 1976, Ahmadinejad took Iran's national university entrance examination. According to his autobiography, he was ranked 132nd out of 400,000 participants that year, and soon enrolled in the Iran University of Science and Technology (IUST), located at Tehran, as an undergraduate student of civil engineering. He would later earn his doctorate in 1997 in transportation engineering and planning from Iran University of Science and Technology as well, when he was the mayor of Ardabil Province, located at the north-west of the country.

== Administrative and academic careers ==
Some details of Ahmadinejad's life during the 1980s are not publicly known, but it is known that he held a number of administrative posts in the province of West Azerbaijan, Iran.

Many reports say that after Saddam Hussein ordered the Iraqi invasion of Iran, Ahmadinejad joined the Islamic Revolutionary Guard Corps and served in their intelligence and security apparatus, but his advisor Mojtaba Samareh Hashemi has said: "He has never been a member or an official member of the Revolutionary Guards", having been a Basiji-like volunteer instead.

Ahmadinejad was accepted to a Master of Science program at his alma mater in 1986. He joined the faculty there as a lecturer in 1989, and in 1997 received his doctorate in civil engineering and traffic transportation planning.

== Early political career ==
After the Islamic Revolution, Ahmadinejad became a member of the Office for Strengthening Unity, an organization developed to prevent students from sympathizing or allying with the emerging militant Mojahedin-e Khalq organisation.

Ahmadinejad first assumed political office as unelected governor to both Maku and Khoy in West Azarbaijan Province during the 1980s. He eventually became an advisor to the governor general of Kurdistan Province for two years. During his doctoral studies at Tehran, he was appointed governor general of newly formed Ardabil Province from 1993 until Mohammad Khatami removed him in 1997, whereupon he returned to teaching.

== Mayor of Tehran (2003–2005) ==
The 2003 mayoral race in Tehran elected conservative candidates from the Alliance of Builders of Islamic Iran to the City Council of Tehran. The Council appointed Ahmadinejad as Mayor.

As mayor, he reversed changes made by previous moderate and reformist mayors. He put religious emphasis on the activities of cultural centres they had founded, publicised the separation of elevators for men and women in the municipality offices, and suggested that people killed in the Iran–Iraq War be buried in major city squares of Tehran. He also worked to improve the traffic system and put an emphasis on charity, such as distributing free soup to the poor.

After his election to the presidency, Ahmadinejad's resignation as the Mayor of Tehran was accepted on 28 June 2005. After two years as mayor, Ahmadinejad was one of 65 finalists for World Mayor in 2005, selected from 550 nominees, only nine of them from Asia. He was among three strong candidates for the top-ten list, but his resignation made him ineligible.

== Presidency (2005–2013) ==
=== Election ===
==== 2005 campaign ====
Ahmadinejad was not particularly well known when he entered the presidential election campaign as he had never run for office before, (he had been mayor of Tehran for only two years and had been appointed, not elected), although he had already made his mark in Tehran for rolling back earlier reforms. He was a member of the Central Council of the Islamic Society of Engineers, but his key political support was inside the Alliance of Builders of Islamic Iran (Abadgaran or Developers). He was also helped by support from supreme leader Ali Khamenei, of whom some described Ahmadinejad as a protégé.

Ahmadinejad was largely non-committal about his plans for his presidency, perhaps to attract both religious conservatives and the lower economic classes. His campaign slogan was: "It's possible and we can do it".

In the campaign, he took a populist approach. He emphasized his own modest life, and compared himself with Mohammad Ali Rajai, Iran's second president. Ahmadinejad said he planned to create an "exemplary government for the people of the world" in Iran. He was a "principlist", acting politically based on Islamic and revolutionary principles. One of his goals was "putting the petroleum income on people's tables", meaning Iran's oil profits would be distributed among the poor.

Ahmadinejad was the only presidential candidate who spoke out against future relations with the United States. He told Islamic Republic of Iran Broadcasting the United Nations was "one-sided, stacked against the world of Islam". He opposed the veto power of the UN Security Council's five permanent members: "It is not just for a few states to sit and veto global approvals. Should such a privilege continue to exist, the Muslim world with a population of nearly 1.5 billion should be extended the same privilege." He defended Iran's nuclear program and accused "a few arrogant powers" of trying to limit Iran's industrial and technological development in this and other fields.

In his second-round campaign, he said, "We didn't participate in the revolution for turn-by-turn government. ... This revolution tries to reach a world-wide government." He spoke of an extended program using trade to improve foreign relations, and called for greater ties with Iran's neighbours and ending visa requirements between states in the region, saying that "people should visit anywhere they wish freely. People should have freedom in their pilgrimages and tours."

Ahmadinejad described Ayatollah Mohammad Taghi Mesbah Yazdi, a senior cleric from Qom, as his ideological and spiritual mentor. Mesbah founded the Haghani School of thought in Iran. He and his team strongly supported Ahmadinejad's 2005 presidential campaign.

==== 2005 presidential election ====
Ahmadinejad won 62% of the vote in the run-off poll against Akbar Hashemi Rafsanjani. Supreme Leader Ayatollah Khamenei authorized his presidency on 3 August 2005. Ahmadinejad kissed Khamenei's hand during the ceremony to show his loyalty.

Shortly after Ahmadinejad was elected president, some Western media outlets published claims that he was among the students who stormed the U.S. embassy in Tehran, sparking the Iran hostage crisis. This claim has been denied by the Iranian government, the Iranian opposition, as well as a United States investigation by the CIA.

==== 2005 cabinet appointments ====
Ministry	Minister
Agriculture	Mohammad Reza Eskandari
Commerce	Masoud Mir Kazemi
Communication and Information Technology	Mohammad Soleimani
Cooperatives	Mohammad Abbasi
Culture and Islamic Guidance	Hossein Saffar Harandi
Defense and Armed Forces Logistics	Mostafa Mohammad Najjar
Economy and Financial Affairs	Hossein Samsami
Education	Alireza Ali Ahmadi
Energy	Parviz Fattah
Foreign Affairs	Manoucher Mottaki
Health and Medical Education	Kamran Bagheri Lankarani
Housing and Urban Development	Mohammad Saeedikia
Industries and Mines	Aliakbar Mehrabian
Intelligence	Gholam Hossein Mohseni-Ejehei
Interior	Mostafa Pour-Mohammadi
Justice	Gholam Hossein Elham
Labour and Social Affairs	Mohammad Jahromi
Petroleum	Gholam Hossein Nozari
Roads and Transportation	Hamid Behbahani
Science, Research, and Technology	Mohammad Mehdi Zahedi
Welfare and Social Security	Abdolreza Mesri

Iran's president is constitutionally obliged to obtain confirmation from the parliament for his selection of ministers. Ahmadinejad presented a short-list at a private meeting on 5 August, and his final list on 14 August. The Majlis rejected all of his cabinet candidates for the oil portfolio and objected to the appointment of his allies in senior government office. The Majlis approved a cabinet on 24 August. The ministers promised to meet frequently outside Tehran and held their first meeting on 25 August in Mashhad, with four empty seats for the unapproved nominees.

==== 2006 councils and Assembly of Experts election ====
Ahmadinejad's team lost the 2006 city council elections. In the first nationwide election since Ahmadinejad became president, his allies failed to dominate election returns for the Assembly of Experts and local councils. Results, with a turnout of about 60%, suggested a voter shift toward more moderate policies. According to an editorial in the Kargozaran independent daily newspaper, "The results show that voters have learned from the past and concluded that we need to support... moderate figures." An Iranian political analyst said that "this is a blow for Ahmadinejad and Mesbah Yazdi's list".

==== 2009 presidential election ====
On 23 August 2008, Supreme Leader Ali Khamenei announced that he "sees Ahmadinejad as president in the next five years", a comment interpreted as indicating support for Ahmadinejad's reelection. 39,165,191 ballots were cast in the election on 12 June 2009, according to Iran's election headquarters. Ahmadinejad won 24,527,516 votes, (62.63%). In second place, Mir-Hossein Mousavi, won 13,216,411 (33.75%) of the votes.

==== 2009 presidential election protests ====
The election results remained in dispute with both Mousavi and Ahmadinejad and their respective supporters who believe that electoral fraud occurred during the election. Supreme Leader Ayatollah Ali Khamenei formally endorsed Ahmadinejad as president on 3 August 2009, and Ahmadinejad was sworn in for a second term on 5 August 2009. Iran's Constitution stipulates term limits of two terms for the office of President. Several Iranian political figures appeared to avoid the ceremony. Former presidents Mohammad Khatami, and Akbar Hashemi Rafsanjani, who was then head of the Expediency Discernment Council, along with opposition leader Mir Hossein Mousavi, did not attend the ceremony. Opposition groups asked protesters on reformist websites and blogs to launch new street demonstrations on the day of the inauguration ceremony. On inauguration day, hundreds of riot police met opposition protesters outside parliament. After taking the oath of office, which was broadcast live on Iranian state television, Ahmadinejad said that he would "protect the official faith, the system of the Islamic revolution and the constitution". France, Germany, the United Kingdom, and the United States announced that they would not send the usual letters of congratulation.

==== 2009 cabinet appointments ====
Ministry	Minister
Agriculture	Sadeq Khalilian
Commerce	Mehdi Ghazanfari
Communication and Information Technology	Reza Taghipour
Cooperatives	Mohammad Abbasi
Culture and Islamic Guidance	Mohammad Hosseini
Defense and Armed Forces Logistics	Ahmad Vahidi
Economy and Financial Affairs	Shamseddin Hosseini
Education	Hamid-Reza Haji Babaee
Energy	Majid Namjoo
Foreign Affairs	Manouchehr Mottaki
Health and Medical Education	Marzieh Vahid Dastjerdi
Housing and Urban Development	Reza Sheykholeslam
Industries and Mines	Aliakbar Mehrabian
Intelligence	Heydar Moslehi
Interior	Mostafa Mohammad Najjar
Justice	Morteza Bakhtiari
Labour and Social Affairs	Ali Nikzad
Petroleum	Masoud Mir Kazemi
Roads and Transportation	Hamid Behbahani
Science, Research, and Technology	Kamran Daneshjoo
Welfare and Social Security	Sadeq Mahsouli

Ahmadinejad announced controversial ministerial appointments for his second term. Esfandiar Rahim Mashaei was briefly appointed as first vice president, but opposed by a number of Majlis members and by the intelligence minister, Gholam-Hossein Mohseni-Eje'i. Mashaei followed orders to resign. Ahmadinejad then appointed Mashaei as chief of staff, and fired Mohseni-Eje'i.

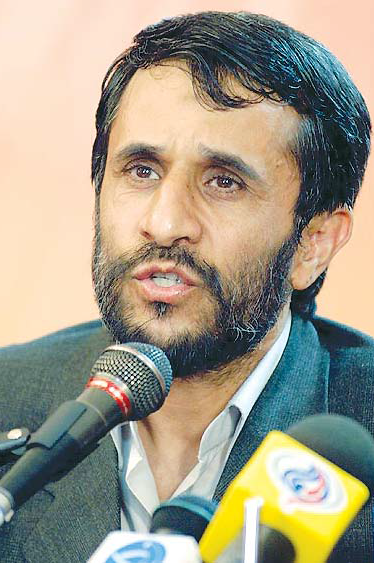
Ahmadinejad in 2005

On 26 July 2009, Ahmadinejad's government faced a legal problem after he sacked four ministers. Iran's constitution (Article 136) stipulates that, if more than half of its members are replaced, the cabinet may not meet or act before the Majlis approves the revised membership. The vice chairman of the Majlis announced that no cabinet meetings or decisions would be legal, pending such a re-approval.

On 4 September 2009, the Majlis approved 18 of the 21 cabinet candidates, and rejected three, including two women. Sousan Keshavarz, Mohammad Aliabadi, and Fatemeh Ajorlou were not approved by Majlis for the Ministries of Education, Energy, and Welfare and Social Security, respectively. Marzieh Vahid Dastjerdi was the first woman approved by the Majlis as a minister in the Islamic Republic of Iran.

==== 2012 parliamentary elections ====
Ahmadinejad suffered a defeat in March/May 2012 parliamentary elections with Ayatollah Khamenei's "Principlist" allies winning about three quarters of the parliaments 290 seats, and Ahmadinejad supporters far fewer.

=== Domestic policy ===
==== Economic policy ====
In Ahmadinejad's first four years as president, Iran's real GDP reflected growth of the economy. Inflation and unemployment also decreased under Ahmadinejad due to better economic management and ending the unsustainable spending and borrowing patterns of previous administrations. Ahmadinejad increased spending by 25% and supported subsidies for food and petrol. He also initially refused a gradual increase of petrol prices, saying that after making necessary preparations, such as a development of public transportation system, the government would free up petrol prices after five years. Interest rates were cut by presidential decree to below the inflation rate. One unintended effect of this stimulation of the economy has been the bidding up of some urban real estate prices by two or three times their pre-Ahmadinejad value by Iranians seeking to invest surplus cash and finding few other safe opportunities. The resulting increase in the cost of housing hurt poorer, non-property owning Iranians, the putative beneficiaries of Ahmadinejad's populist policies. The Management and Planning Organisation, a state body charged with mapping out long-term economic and budget strategy, was broken up and its experienced managers were fired.

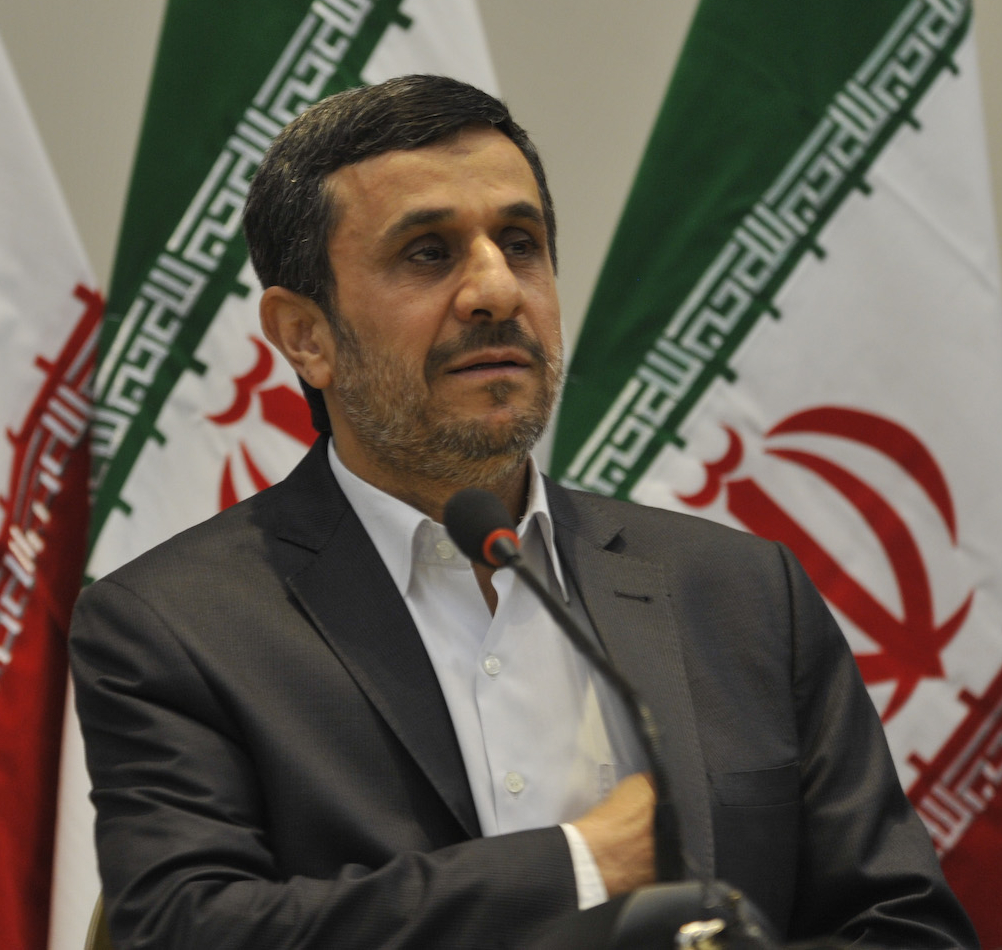
Ahmadinejad at the United Nations Conference on Sustainable Development in 2012

In June 2006, 50 Iranian economists wrote a letter to Ahmadinejad that criticized his price interventions to stabilize prices of goods, cement, government services, and his decree issued by the High Labor Council and the Ministry of Labor that proposed an increase of workers' salaries by 40%. Ahmadinejad publicly responded harshly to the letter and denounced the accusations. Ahmadinejad called for "middle-of-the-road" compromises with respect to Western-oriented capitalism and socialism. Current political conflicts with the United States caused the central bank to fear increased capital flight due to global isolation. These factors prevented an improvement of infrastructure and capital influx, despite high economic potential. Among those that did not vote for him in the first election, only 3.5% said they would consider voting for him in the next election. Mohammad Khoshchehreh, a member of the Iranian parliament who campaigned for Ahmadinejad, said that his government "has been strong on populist slogans, but weak on achievement".

President Ahmadinejad changed almost all of his economic ministers, including oil, industry, and economy, from the time he came to power in 2005. In an interview with Fars News Agency in April 2008, Davoud Danesh Jaafari who acted as minister of economy in Ahmadinejad's cabinet, harshly criticized his economic policy: "During my time, there was no positive attitude towards previous experiences or experienced people and there was no plan for the future. Peripheral issues which were not of dire importance to the nation were given priority. Most of the scientific economic concepts like the effect of liquidity on inflation were put in question." In response to these criticisms, Ahmadinejad accused his minister of not being "a man of justice" and declared that the solution to Iran's economic problem is "the culture of martyrdom". In May 2008, the petroleum minister of Iran admitted that the government illegally invested 2 billion dollars to import petrol in 2007. At Iranian parliament, he also mentioned that he simply followed the president's order.

While his government had 275 thousand billion toman oil income, the highest in Iranian history, Ahmadinejad's government had the highest budget deficit since the Iranian revolution.

During his presidency, Ahmadinejad launched a gasoline rationing plan to reduce the country's fuel consumption. He also instituted cuts in the interest rates that private and public banking facilities could charge. He issued a directive that the Management and Planning Organization be affiliated to the government. In May 2011, Ahmadinejad announced that he would temporarily run the Oil Ministry.

==== Family planning and population policy ====
In October 2006, Ahmadinejad began calling for the scrapping of Iran's existing birth-control policies which discouraged Iranian couples from having more than two children. He told MPs that Iran could cope with 50 million more people than the current 70 million. In November 2010, he urged Iranians to marry and reproduce earlier: "We should take the age of marriage for boys to 20 and for girls to about 16 and 17." His remarks drew criticism and called ill-judged at a time when Iran was struggling with surging inflation and rising unemployment, estimated at 11%. Ahmadinejad's call was reminiscent of a call for Iranians to have more children made by Ayatollah Ruhollah Khomeini in 1979. The policy had increased Iran's population by 16 million in seven years but had eventually been reversed in response to the resultant economic strain.

In 2008, the government sent the "Family Protection Bill" to the Iranian parliament. Women's rights activists criticized the bill for removing protections from women, such as the requirement that a husband obtain his wife's consent before marrying a second wife. Women's rights in Iran are more religiously based than those in secular countries.

==== Housing ====
The first legislation to emerge from his newly formed government was a 12 trillion rial (US$1.3 billion) fund called "Reza's Compassion Fund", named after Shi'a Imam Ali al-Rida. Ahmadinejad's government said this fund would tap Iran's oil revenues to help young people get jobs, afford marriage, and buy their own homes. The fund also sought charitable donations, with a board of trustees in each of Iran's 30 provinces. The legislation was a response to the cost of urban housing, which is pushing up the national average marital age (currently around 25 years for women and 28 years for men). In 2006 the Iranian parliament rejected the fund; however, Ahmadinejad ordered the administrative council to execute the plan.

==== Human rights ====
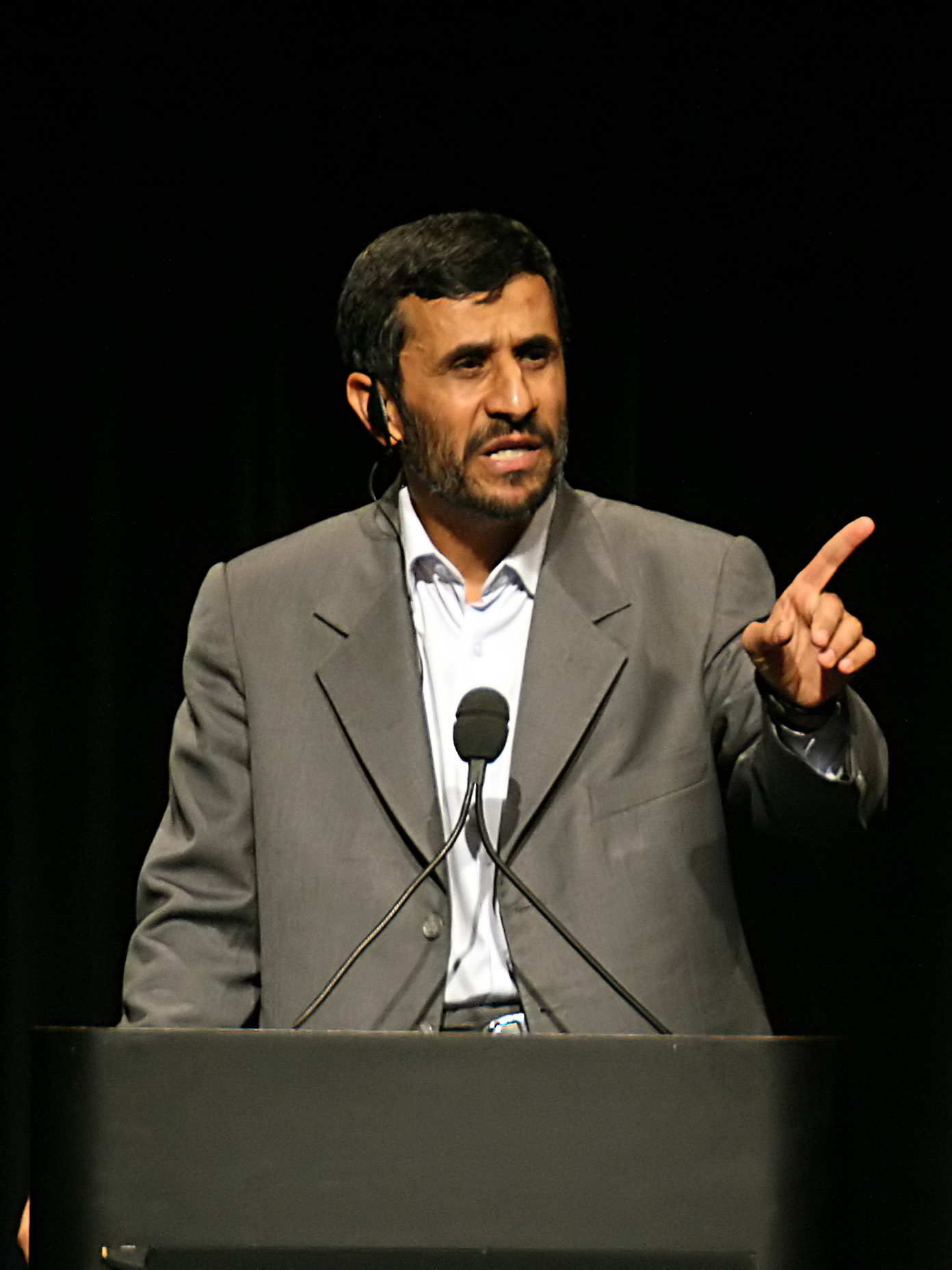
Ahmadinejad speaking at Columbia University, September 2007

According to a report by Human Rights Watch, "Since President Ahmadinejad came to power, treatment of detainees has worsened in Evin Prison as well as in detention centers operated clandestinely by the Judiciary, the Ministry of Information, and the Islamic Revolutionary Guard Corps." Human Rights Watch also has stated, "Respect for basic human rights in Iran, especially freedom of expression and assembly, deteriorated in 2006. The government routinely tortures and mistreats detained dissidents, including through prolonged solitary confinement." Human Rights Watch described the source of human rights violations in contemporary Iran as coming from the Judiciary, accountable to Ali Khamenei, and from members directly appointed by Ahmadinejad. Responses to dissent have varied. Human Rights Watch writes that "the Ahmadinejad government, in a pronounced shift from the policy under former president Mohammed Khatami, has shown no tolerance for peaceful protests and gatherings". In December 2006, Ahmadinejad advised officials not to disturb students who engaged in a protest during a speech of his at the Amirkabir University of Technology in Tehran, although speakers at other protests have included among their complaints that there had been a crackdown on dissent at universities since Ahmadinejad was elected. In April 2007, the Tehran police, under Khamenei's supervision, began a crackdown on women with "improper hijab". This led to criticism from associates of Ahmadinejad. In 2012, Ahmadinejad claimed that AIDS was created by the West in order to weaken poorer countries, and repeated a previous claim that homosexual Iranians did not exist. He has also described homosexuality as "ugly".

==== Universities ====
In 2006, the Ahmadinejad government reportedly forced numerous Iranian scientists and university professors to resign or to retire. It has been referred to as the "second cultural revolution". The policy has been said to replace old professors with younger ones. Some university professors received letters indicating their early retirement unexpectedly. In November 2006, 53 university professors had to retire from Iran University of Science and Technology.

In 2006, Ahmadinejad's government applied a 50% quota for male students and 50% for female students in the university entrance exam for medicine, dentistry and pharmacy. The plan was supposed to stop the growing presence of female students in the universities. In a response to critics, Iranian minister of health and medical education, Kamran Bagheri Lankarani argued that there are not enough facilities such as dormitories for female students. Masoud Salehi, president of Zahedan University said that presence of women generates some problems with transportation. Also, Ebrahim Mekaniki, president of Babol University of Medical Sciences, stated that an increase in the presence of women will make it difficult to distribute facilities in a suitable manner. Bagher Larijani, the president of Tehran University of Medical Sciences made similar remarks. According to Rooz Online, the quotas lack a legal foundation and are justified as support for "family" and "religion".

===== December 2006 student protest =====
In December 2006, it was reported that some students were angry about the International Conference to Review the Global Vision of the Holocaust, which they saw as promoting Holocaust denial.

In response to the students' slogans, the president said: "We have been standing up to dictatorship so that no one will dare to establish dictatorship in a millennium even in the name of freedom. Given the scars inflicted on the Iranian nation by agents of the US and British dictatorship, no one will ever dare to initiate the rise of a dictator." It was reported that even though the protesters broke the TV cameras and threw hand-made bombs at Ahmadinejad, the president asked the officials not to question or disturb the protesters. In his blog, Ahmadinejad described his reaction to the incident as "a feeling of joy" because of the freedom that people enjoyed after the revolution.

One thousand students also protested the day before to denounce the increased pressure on the reformist groups at the university. One week prior, more than two thousand students protested at Tehran University on the country's annual student day, with speakers saying that there had been a crackdown on dissent at universities since Ahmadinejad was elected.

==== Nuclear program ====
Ahmadinejad has been a vocal supporter of Iran's nuclear program, and has insisted that it is for peaceful purposes. He has repeatedly emphasized that building a nuclear bomb is not the policy of his government. He has said that such a policy is "illegal and against our religion". He also added at a January 2006 conference in Tehran that a nation with "culture, logic and civilization" would not need nuclear weapons, and that countries that seek nuclear weapons are those that want to solve all problems by the use of force.

In April 2006, Ahmadinejad announced that Iran had successfully refined uranium to a stage suitable for the nuclear fuel cycle. In a speech to students and academics in Mashhad, he was quoted as saying that Iran's conditions had changed completely as it had become a nuclear state and could talk to other states from that stand. On 13 April 2006, Iran's news agency, Islamic Republic News Agency (IRNA), quoted Ahmadinejad as saying that the peaceful Iranian nuclear technology would not pose a threat to any party because "we want peace and stability and we will not cause injustice to anyone and at the same time we will not submit to injustice". Nevertheless, Iran's nuclear policy under Ahmadinejad's administration received much criticism, spearheaded by the United States and Israel. The accusations include that Iran is striving to obtain nuclear arms and developing long-range firing capabilities—and that Ahmadinejad issued an order to keep UN inspectors from freely visiting the nation's nuclear facilities and viewing their designs, in defiance of an IAEA resolution. Following a May 2009 test launch of a long-range missile, Ahmadinejad was quoted as telling the crowd that with its nuclear program, Iran was sending the West a message that "the Islamic Republic of Iran is running the show".

Despite Ahmadinejad's vocal support for the program, the office of the Iranian president is not directly responsible for nuclear policy. It is instead set by the Supreme National Security Council. The council includes two representatives appointed by the Supreme Leader, military officials, and members of the executive, judicial, and legislative branches of government, and reports directly to Supreme Leader Ali Khamenei, who issued a fatwa against nuclear weapons in 2005. Khamenei has criticized Ahmadinejad's "personalization" of the nuclear issue.

Ahmadinejad vowed in February 2008 that Iran will not be held back from developing its peaceful nuclear program.

In October 2009, the United States, France, and Russia proposed a U.N.-drafted deal with Iran regarding its nuclear program, in an effort to find a compromise between Iran's stated need for a nuclear reactor and the concerns of those who are worried that Iran harbors a secret intent of developing a nuclear weapon. After some delay in responding, on 29 October, Ahmadinejad seemed to change his tone towards the deal. "We welcome fuel exchange, nuclear co-operation, building of power plants and reactors and we are ready to co-operate", he said in a live broadcast on state television. He added that Iran would not retreat "one iota" on its right to a sovereign nuclear program.

=== Domestic criticism and controversies ===
==== Accusations of corruption ====
According to Brussels-based NGO International Crisis Group, Ahmadinejad has been criticized for attacking private "plunderers" and "corrupt officials", while engaging in "cronyism and political favouritism". Many of his close associates were appointed to positions for which they have no obvious qualifications, and "billion dollar no-bid contracts" were awarded to the Islamic Revolutionary Guard Corps (IRGC), an organization with which he is strongly associated.

The scale of corruption under Mr. Ahmadinejad was of a different order, according to both reform-minded and conservative politicians.

==== Other statements ====
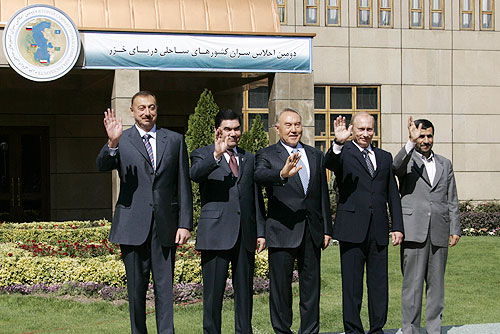
Participants of the second Caspian Summit in October 2007. From left to right: President of Azerbaijan Ilham Aliev, President of Turkmenistan Gurbanguly Berdimuhamedow, President of Kazakhstan Nursultan Nazarbayev, President of Russia Vladimir Putin and Ahmadinejad.

In June 2007, Ahmadinejad was criticized by some Iranian parliament members over his remark about Christianity and Judaism. According to Aftab News Agency, Ahmadinejad stated: "In the world, there are deviations from the right path: Christianity and Judaism. Dollars have been devoted to the propagation of these deviations. There are also false claims that these [religions] will save mankind. But Islam is the only religion that [can] save mankind." Some members of Iranian parliament criticized these remarks as being fuels to religious war.

Conservative MP Rafat Bayat has accused Ahmadinejad for a decline in observance of the required hijab for women, calling him "not that strict on this issue". Ahmadinejad was also accused of indecency by people close to Rafsanjani, after he publicly kissed the hand of a woman who used to be his school teacher.

==== The UN and football stadiums ====
There are two statements that led to criticism from some religious authorities. One concerns his speech at the United Nations, and the other concerns the attendance of women at football matches. During a visit to group of ayatollahs in Qom after returning from his 2005 speech to the UN General Assembly, Ahmadinejad stated he had "felt a halo over his head" during his speech and that a hidden presence had mesmerized the unblinking audience of foreign leaders, foreign ministers, and ambassadors. Ahmadinejad closed his speech with a call for the "mighty Lord" to "hasten the emergence" of Imam Mahdi. According to Iranian-American journalist Hooman Majd, the response given to Ahmadinejad at the assembly was offensive to the conservative religious leaders because an ordinary man cannot presume a special closeness to God or any of the Imams, nor can he imply the presence of the Mahdi.

In another statement in 2006, Ahmadinejad proclaimed (without consulting the clerics beforehand), that women be allowed into football stadiums to watch male football clubs compete. This proclamation "was quickly overruled" by clerical authorities, one of whom, Grand Ayatollah Mohammad Fazel Lankarani "refused for weeks to meet with President Ahmadinejad" in early 2007.

==== Constitutional conflict ====
In 2008, a serious conflict emerged between the Iranian President and the head of parliament over three laws approved by the Iranian parliament: "the agreement for civil and criminal legal cooperation between Iran and Kyrgyzstan", "the agreement to support mutual investment between Iran and Kuwait", and "the law for registration of industrial designs and trademarks". The conflict was so serious that the Iranian leader stepped in to resolve it. Ahmadinejad wrote a letter to the parliamentary speaker Gholam-Ali Haddad-Adel, furiously denouncing him for the "inexplicable act" of bypassing the presidency by giving the order to implement legislation in an official newspaper. Ahmadinejad accused the head of parliament of violating Iranian constitutional law. He called for legal action against the parliament speaker. Haddad-Adel responded to Ahmadinejad accusing him of using inappropriate language in his remarks and letters.

==== Ali Kordan ====
In August 2008, Ahmadinejad appointed Ali Kordan as interior minister. Kordan's appointment was heavily criticized by Iranian parliamentarians, media and analysts after it came to light that a doctoral degree purportedly awarded to Kordan was fabricated, and that the putative issuer of the degree, Oxford University, had no record of Kordan receiving any degree from the university. It was also revealed that he had been jailed in 1978 for moral charges.

In November 2008, Ahmadinejad announced that he was against impeachment of Kordan by Iranian parliament. He refused to attend the parliament on the impeachment day. Kordan was expelled from office by Iranian parliament on 4 November 2008. 188 MPs voted against him. An impeachment of Kordan would push Ahmadinejad close to having to submit his entire cabinet for review by parliament, which was led by one of his chief political opponents. Iran's constitution requires that step if more than half the cabinet ministers are replaced, and Ahmadinejad replaced nine of 21 until that date.

==== Conflict with Parliament ====
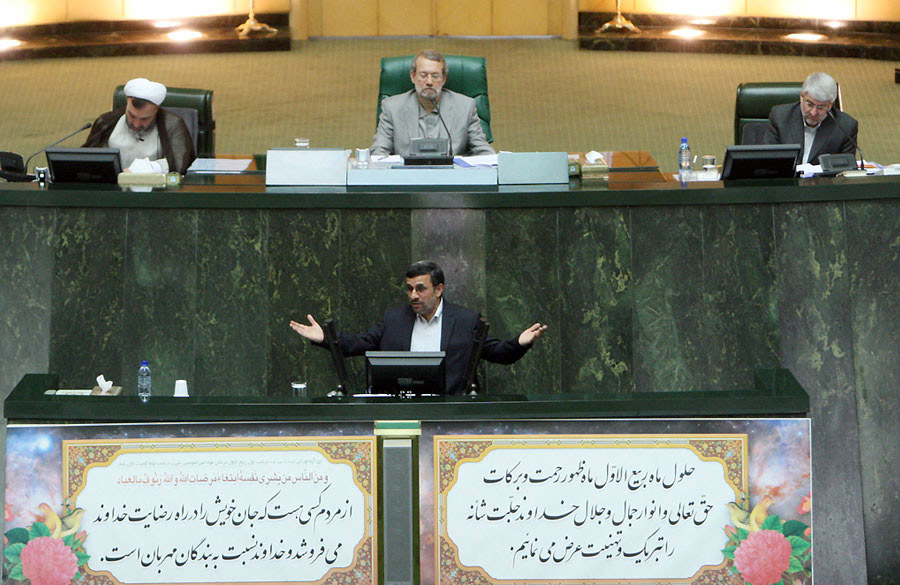
Ahmadinejad speaking in the Majlis, Chairman Ali Larijani is also pictured

In February 2009, after Supreme Audit Court of Iran reported that $1.058 billion of surplus oil revenue in the (2006–2007) budget hadn't been returned by the government to the national treasury, Tensions between Larijani and Ahmadinejad continued into 2013.

Ahmadinejad criticized the National Audit Office for what he called its "carelessness", saying the report "incites the people" against the government.

In May 2011, several members of parliament threatened to initiate impeachment proceedings against Ahmadinejad after his merger of eight government ministries and the firing of three ministers without parliament's consent. According to the Majles news website, MP Mohammad Reza Bahonar stated, "legal purging starts with questions, which lead to warnings and end with impeachment". On 25 May, parliament voted to investigate another allegation, that Ahmadinejad had committed election irregularities by giving cash to up to nine million Iranians before the 2009 presidential elections. The vote came within hours after the allegations appeared in several popular conservative news sites associated with supreme leader Ali Khamenei, suggesting the supreme leader supported the investigation. The disputes were seen as part of the clash between Ahmadinejad and other conservatives and former supporters, including supreme leader Khamenei, over what the conservatives see as Ahmadinejad's confrontational policies and abuse of power.

==== Relations with Supreme Leader of Iran ====
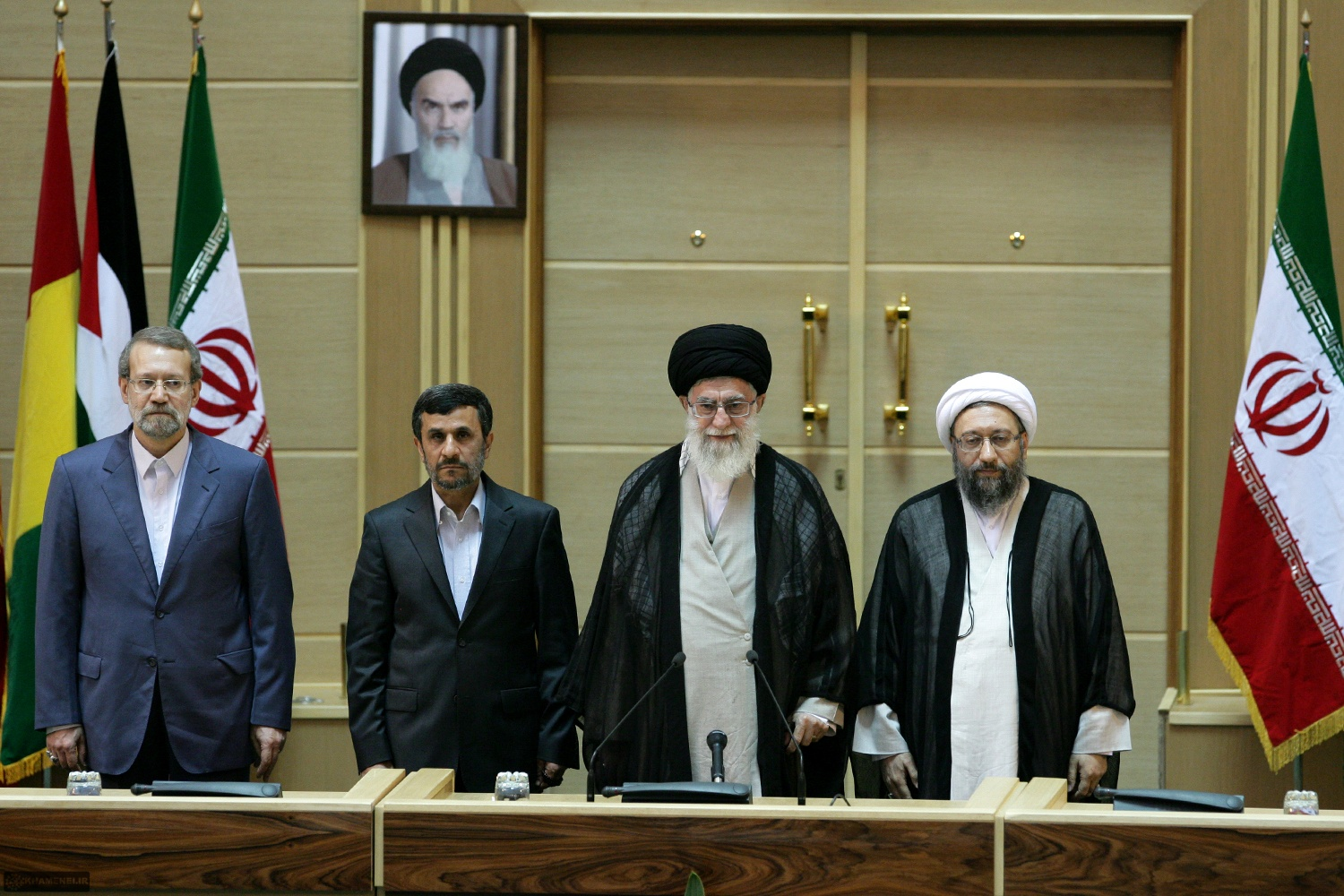
Ahmadinejad with Ali Khamenei, Ali Larijani and Sadeq Larijani in 2011

Early in his presidency, Ahmadinejad was sometimes described as "enjoy[ing] the full backing" of the Supreme Leader Ali Khamenei, and even as being his "protege". In Ahmadinejad's 2005 inauguration the supreme leader allowed Ahmadinejad to kiss his hand and cheeks in what was called "a sign of closeness and loyalty", and after the 2009 election fully endorsed Ahmadinejad against protesters.

However, as early as January 2008, signs of disagreement between the two men developed over domestic policies, and by the period of 2010–11 several sources detected a "growing rift" between them. The disagreement was described as centered on Esfandiar Rahim Mashaei, a top adviser and close confidant of Ahmadinejad and opponent of "greater involvement of clerics in politics", who was first vice president of Iran until being ordered to resign from the cabinet by the supreme leader.

In 2009, Ahmadinejad dismissed Intelligence Minister Gholam-Hossein Mohseni-Eje'i, an opponent of Mashaei. In April 2011, another Intelligence minister, Heydar Moslehi, resigned after being asked to by Ahmadinejad, but was reinstated by the supreme leader within hours. Ahmadinejad declined to officially back Moslehi's reinstatement for two weeks and in protest engaged in an "11-day walkout" of cabinet meetings, religious ceremonies, and other official functions. Ahmadinejad's actions led to angry public attacks by clerics, parliamentarians and military commanders, who accused him of ignoring orders from the supreme leader.

Conservative opponents in parliament launched an "impeachment drive" against him, four websites with ties to Ahmadinejad reportedly were "filtered and blocked", and several people "said to be close" to the president and Mashaei (such as Abbas Amirifar and Mohammed Sharif Malekzadeh) were arrested on charges of being "magicians" and invoking djinns. On 6 May 2011, it was reported that Ahmadinejad had been given an ultimatum to accept the leader's intervention or resign, and on 8 May, he "apparently bowed" to the reinstatement, welcoming back Moslehi to a cabinet meeting. The events have been said to have "humiliated and weakened" Ahmadinejad, though the president denied that there had been any rift between the two, and according to the semiofficial Fars News Agency, he stated that his relationship with the supreme leader "is that of a father and a son".

In 2012, Khamenei ordered a halt to a parliamentary inquiry into Ahmadinejad's mishandling of the Iranian economy. In 2016, Khamenei advised Mahmoud Ahmadinejad, his former ally with whom his relationship was strained after Ahmadinejad accused his son Mojtaba Khamenei of embezzling from the state treasury, to not run for president again.

==== Hugo Chávez's funeral ====
Ahmadinejad was criticised by the religious and political groups in Iran for photographs taken of him embracing Elena Frias de Chávez, the mother of recently deceased Venezuelan president Hugo Chávez, at his funeral. In the image, Ahmadinejad was thought to be holding her hands and in a cheek-to-cheek embrace; such an act, touching an unrelated woman, is considered haraam (forbidden) in some interpretations of Islam. Iranian government officials responded by stating that the image was a fake, then released a second photo showing Ahmadinejad in the same pose, but in this case hugging a man. This later photograph was debunked when it was discovered that the other man was Egyptian opposition leader Mohamed ElBaradei, who had not been at the funeral.

==== Nepotism ====
One of the most frequent criticisms about Ahmadinejad was the nepotism in his governments. Nepotism was one of his habits in appointing senior government officials. His elder brother, Davoud, was appointed chief inspector at the presidency in 2005 and was in office until 2008. His sister, Parvin, served at the presidential's women's center. His nephew, Ali Akbar Mehrabian, served as the mining and industry minister in his cabinet. His daughter's father-in-law, Esfandiar Rahim Mashaei, served at several senior positions. His brother-in-law, Masoud Zaribafan, served as cabinet secretary.

=== Foreign relations ===
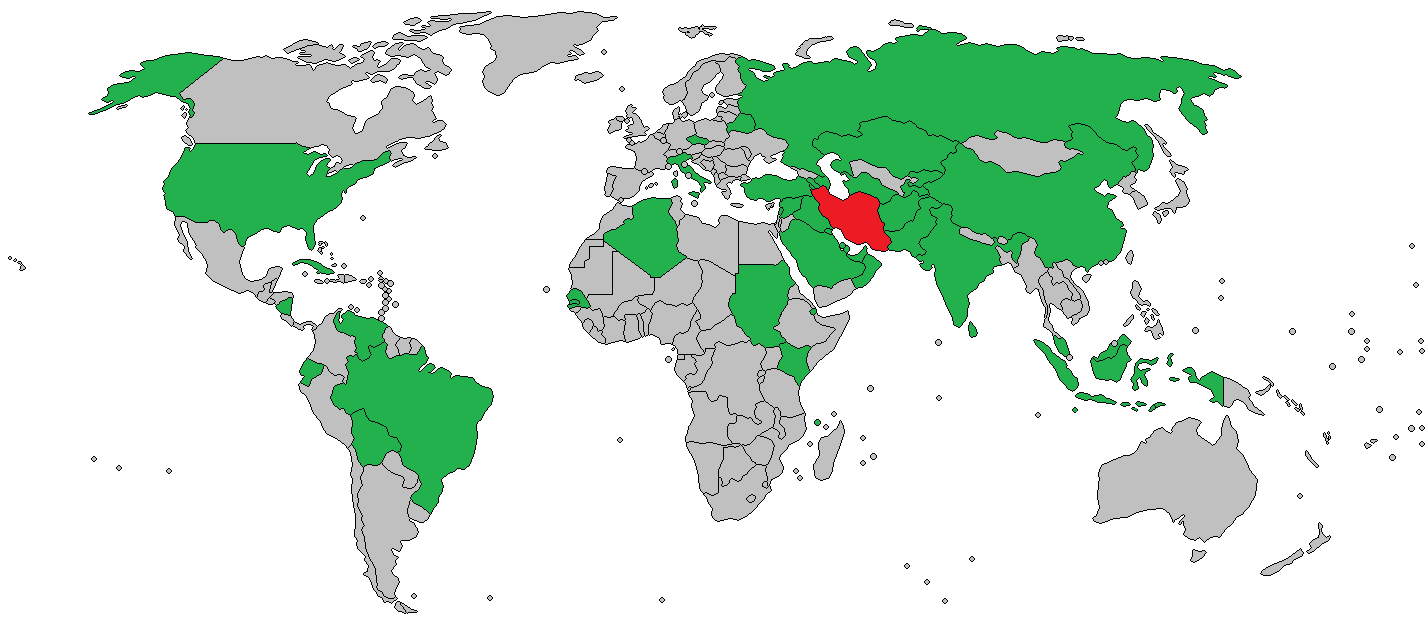
Countries visited by President Ahmadinejad during his terms in office

During Ahmadinejad's tenure as President of Iran the foreign policy of the country took a different approach from the previous administration. Relations with developed countries generally soured while relations with less-developed countries, including those in Africa and Latin America, rose. In light of the calls for sanctions on Iran for its nuclear weapons programme, Ahmadinejad and his foreign minister, Manouchehr Mottaki, traveled extensively throughout the two regions, as well as hosted other leaders. Relations with the ALBA states, and Venezuela, Bolivia, and Ecuador, in particular, were most strengthened. Relations with America during the Bush administration and Israel deteriorated further.

Ahmadinejad is an outspoken critic of the Western world and is often criticized for his hostility towards the United States, Israel, the United Kingdom and other Western nations.

==== Israel ====
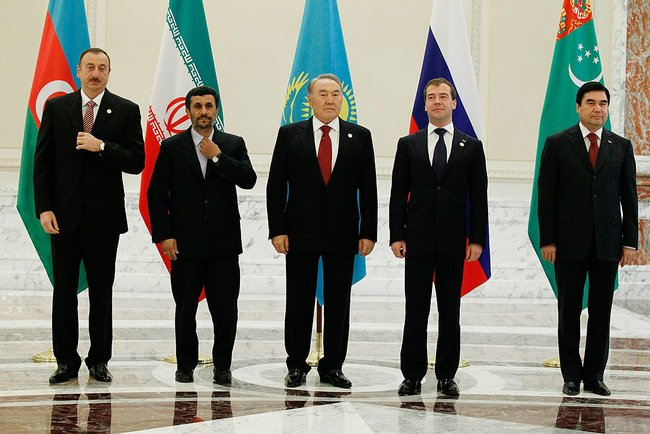
Ahmadinejad with leaders of the Caspian sea bordering nations

Ahmadinejad abides by Iran's long-standing policy of refusing to recognize Israel as a legitimate state, and wants the Jewish people who immigrated to Israel to return to their "fatherlands".

In 2005, Ahmadinejad, in a speech praising the Iranian Supreme Leader Ayatollah Khomeini, was translated by Iranian state-run media as saying that "Israel must be wiped off the map." A controversy erupted over the translation, with specialists such as Juan Cole of the University of Michigan and Arash Norouzi of the Mossadegh Project pointing out that the original statement in Farsi did not say that Israel should be wiped off the map, but instead that it would collapse. The words 'Israel', 'map', and 'to wipe off' are non-existent in the Iranian speech's original. According to another IRNA translation, on the occasion of a commemoration of the anniversary of Khomeini's death on 3 June 2008, Ahmadinejad stated that "The corrupt element will be wiped off the map." Contextually, Ahmadinejad was quoting Khomeini's words about the imminent disappearance of the Soviet Union and the Shah's regime, and tacked on his remarks concerning Israel. In Katajun Amirpur's analysis, there is no implication in the text that Iran intended destroying Israel or annihilating the Jewish people, any more than Khomeini was suggesting with his words that the Russians, or the Iranian people themselves under the Shah would be extinguished. Ahmadinejad is on the record as stating that Iran had no plans to attack Israel. The statement itself was in fact a citation, with a minute verbal variation, of a remark made by Ayatollah Khomeini in 1979, which had created no furor at the time, but did so when Ahmadinejad quoted them in 2005.

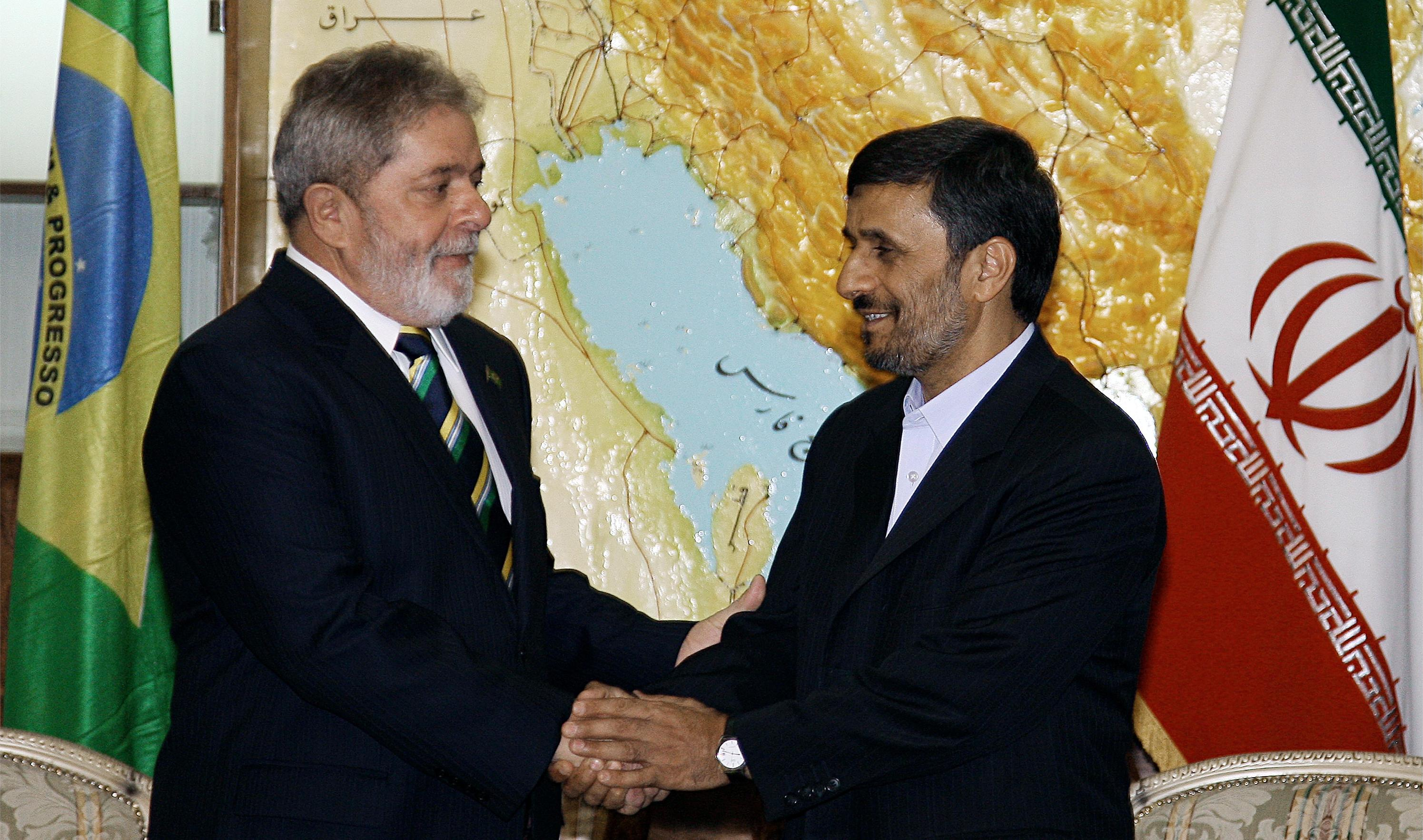
Ahmadinejad meeting with Brazilian president Luiz Inácio Lula da Silva in Tehran

Dan Meridor, Israel's minister of intelligence and atomic energy said during an Al Jazeera interview that Ayatollah Ali Khamenei had repeatedly said "that Israel is an unnatural creature, it will not survive. They didn't say, 'We'll wipe it out,' you're right, but, 'It will not survive.'" adding "If Iran says this, and continues to pile up uranium that they enrich, and build missiles in big numbers, and have a nuclear military plan—if you put all this together, you can't say, they don't really mean it." The Washington Post's fact-checker editor Glenn Kessler says the interpretation gets murkier when Ahmadinejad's quote is set against other Iranian propaganda. Karim Sadjadpour, an Iranian specialist at the Carnegie Endowment for International Peace, cites proof that the Iranian government releases propaganda that clearly says Israel should be "wiped off". Joshua Teitelbaum of the Jerusalem Center for Public Affairs discovered pictures of Iranian propaganda banners that clearly say in English: "Israel should be wiped out of the face of the world." In March 2016, Iran tested a ballistic missile painted with the phrase "Israel should be wiped off the Earth" in Hebrew. The missile is reported to be capable of reaching Israel.

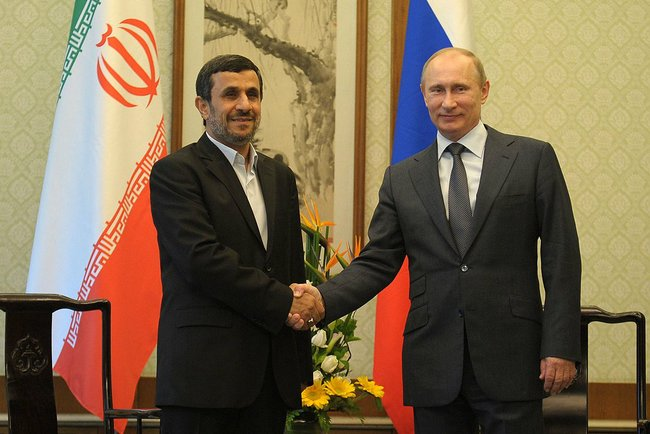
Ahmadinejad meeting with Russian president Vladimir Putin in Beijing

The Official Web site of the President of Iran quoted Ahmadinejad as saying on 15 May 2011 "The reason for our insistence that the Zionist regime should be wiped out and vanished is that the Zionist regime is the main base for imposing oppression and harbors the main terrorists of the world."

==== Holocaust denial controversy ====
He was strongly criticized after claiming that the Jews invented the Holocaust and making other statements influenced by "classic anti-Semitic ideas", which has led to accusations of antisemitism. Ahmadinejad denied that he was an antisemite, saying that he "respects Jews very much" and that he was not "passing judgment" on the Holocaust. Later, Ahmadinejad claimed that promoting Holocaust denial was a major achievement of his presidency; he stated that "put[ting] it forward at the global level ... broke the spine of the Western capitalist regime". The comments appeared on the Arabic but not on the English version of Fars News Agency's website.

==== Palestine ====
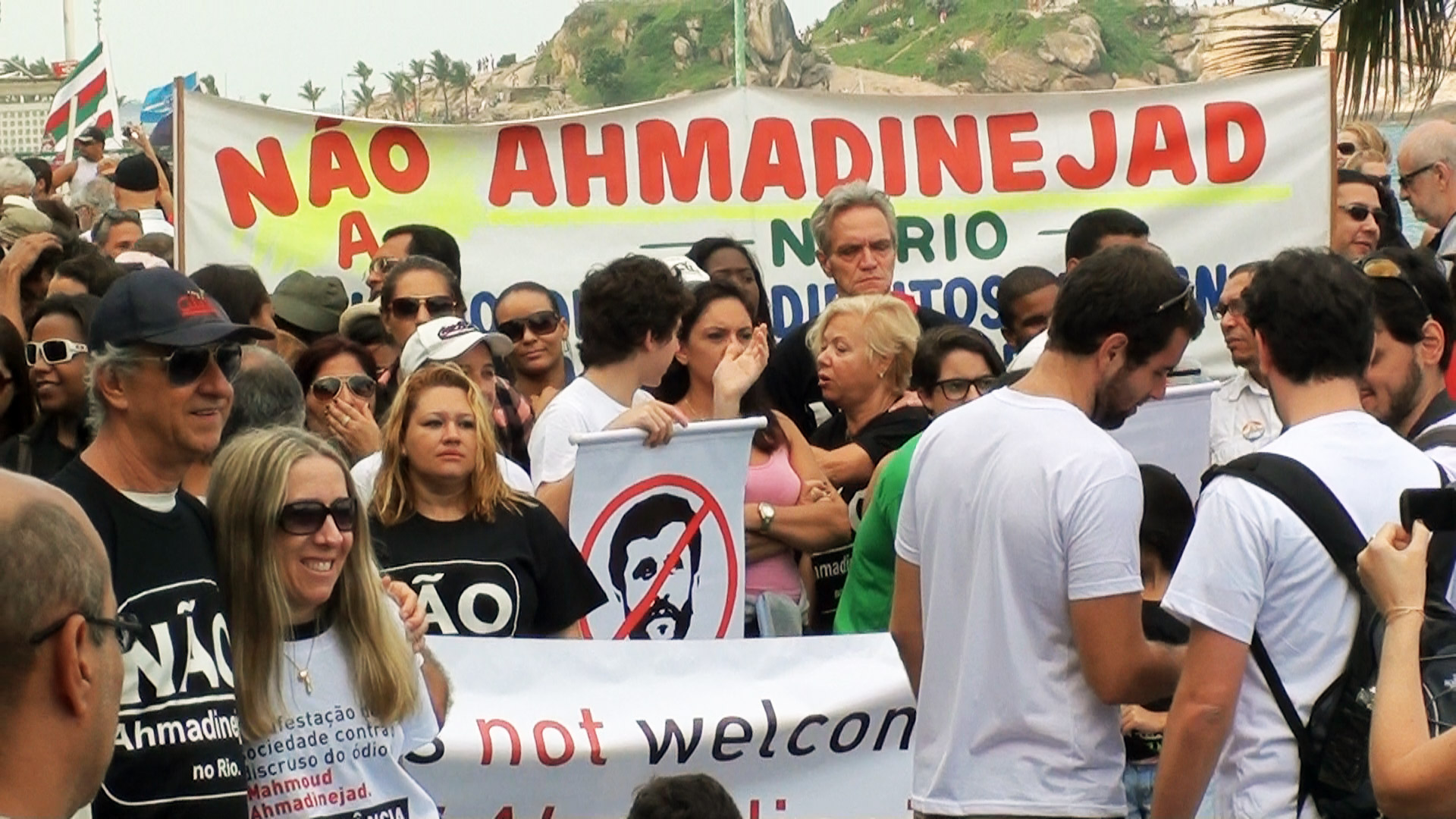
Demonstration against Ahmadinejad during the Rio+20 conference in Brazil

Ahmadinejad advocates "free elections" for the region, and believes Palestinians need a stronger voice in the region's future. On Quds Day in September 2010 he criticized the Palestinian Authority over its president's decision to renew direct peace talks with Israel saying the talks are "stillborn" and "doomed to fail", urging the Palestinians to continue armed resistance to Israel. He said that Mahmoud Abbas had no authority to negotiate on behalf of the Palestinians. Nabil Abu Rudeineh, a spokesman for the Palestinian Authority, fired back, saying, Ahmadinejad "does not represent the Iranian people, ..., is not entitled to talk about Palestine, or the President of Palestine".

==== United States ====
In September 2010, Ahmadinejad made a contentious assertion at the 65th session of the United Nations General Assembly by claiming that most people believe the United States government was behind the 9/11 attacks and later called for an inquiry, stating: "The fact-finding mission can shed light on who the perpetrators were, who is al-Qaeda ... where does it exist? Who was it backed by and supported? All these should come to light." The speech triggered many countries' United Nations representatives to walk out, and US President Barack Obama described the claims as "inexcusable", "offensive" and "hateful". In 2010, Ahmadinejad reiterated the 9/11 conspiracy, and wrote:

Establishing an independent and impartial committee of investigation, which would determine the roots and causes of the regrettable event of 9/11, is the demand of all the peoples of the region and the world. ... Any opposition to this legal and human demand means that 9/11 was premeditated in order to achieve the goals of occupation and of confrontation with the nations.

He made similar comments at the 66th session in September 2011.

==== Venezuela ====
Ahmadinejad is said to have "forged a close public friendship" with Venezuelan president Hugo Chávez. On Chavez's death in March 2013, Ahmadinejad posted a condolence message on his website stating, "I have no doubt that he [Chavez] will return alongside Jesus Christ and Mahdi to establish peace and justice in the world".

Ahmad Khatami a senior Iranian cleric said that Ahmadinejad went "too far" with his comments. Hossein Rouhaninejad of Iran's Islamic development organisation said the president's remarks were against Shia Islam beliefs. Another senior cleric, Seyed Mahdi rebuked Ahmadinejad saying his comments were "legally and religiously wrong".

== Post-presidency (2013–present) ==
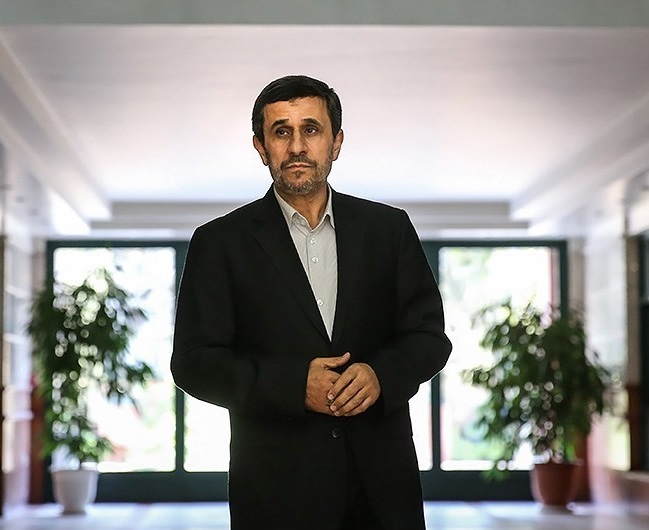
Ahmadinejad in his presidential museum, known as Office of the Former President of Islamic Republic of Iran

Ahmadinejad left his office at Pasteur St. on 3 August 2013 and returned to his private house in Narmak.

In an interview with CNN, Ahmadinejad said that, after the end of his presidency, he would return to the university and retire from politics; however, Ahmadinejad announced from Russia on the sidelines of an OPEC summit on 2 July 2013 that he might stay involved with politics by creating a new party or non-governmental organization. In late July, Mehr news agency reported that Ahmadinejad obtained permission from the Supreme Cultural Revolution Council to launch a university for post-graduate studies in Tehran. On 5 August 2013, the Supreme Leader Ali Khamenei issued a decree appointing Ahmadinejad as a member of the Expediency Council. On 15 June 2015, a number of Ahmadinejad's cabinet ministers established a new political party, called YEKTA Front. The party published list for 2016 legislative election and some of Ahmadinejad's cabinet members (like Hamid-Reza Haji Babaee, Sadeq Khalilian, Mohammad Abbasi and Mahmoud Bahmani) registered for the election, but Ahmadinejad did not support any list in the election.

=== 2017 presidential election ===
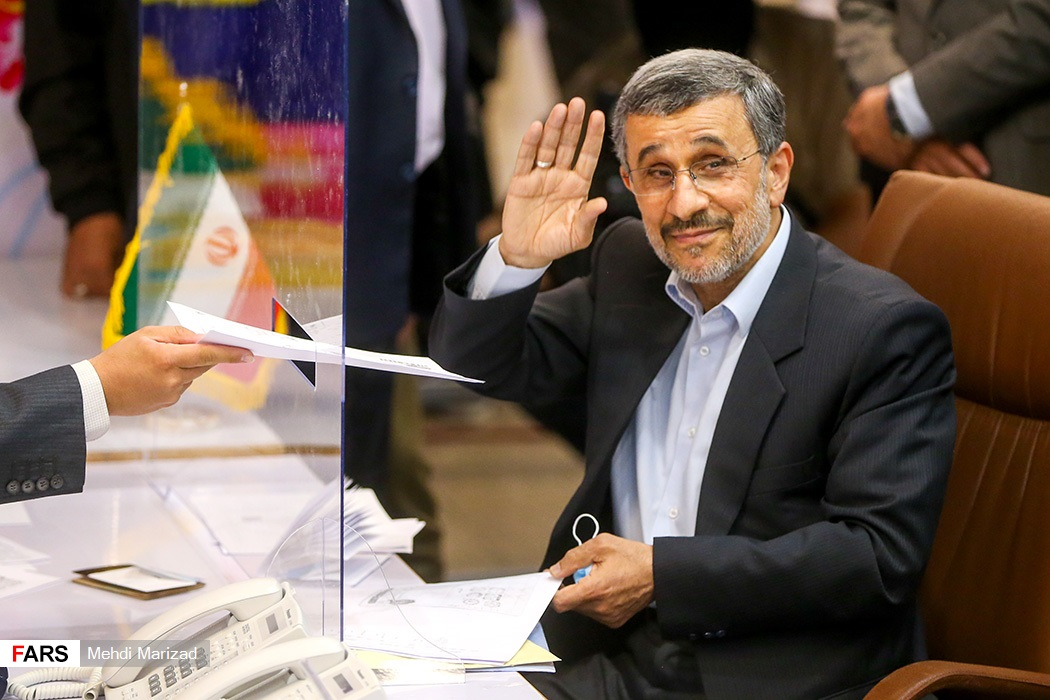
Ahmadinejad in 2021

It was rumored that Ahmadinejad would run for president again in 2017 after he did not deny plans when questioned by the media in 2015. Ahmadinejad remained mostly out of the public eye after leaving office, but his anti-Western rhetoric and combative style remained popular among many Iranian Principlists, and he was widely viewed as among the most formidable political figures capable of unseating Hassan Rouhani. In December 2015, it was reported that he had begun his presidential campaign by appointing his campaign's chiefs. He also began provincial travels in April 2016 by traveling to Amol. Travels were continued until September 2016, when he traveled to Gorgan. Ahmadinejad's advisors said his travels were not electoral and he only delivered speeches due to public demand. In September 2016, it was rumored that Ahmadinejad had asked Ali Khamenei, Supreme Leader of Iran, for permission to run for the office and was rejected by Khamenei, who said that it was not in the best interests of Iran. On 26 September 2016, Khamenei confirmed the news, but stated that it was only advice, not an order. It was the first time since Khamenei's election as Supreme Leader in 1989 that he advised a person to not run for election. Formerly, some candidates had asked him for advice (former president Akbar Hashemi Rafsanjani for his campaign in 2005 and 2013), but Khamenei chose to not give his opinion on those occasions. The following day, Ahmadinejad officially announced he would not run in the upcoming 2017 presidential election. He later supported Hamid Baghaei's candidacy. However, Ahmadinejad registered as presidential candidate on 12 April 2017. He was disqualified by the Guardian Council on 20 April 2017, making him the second person after Akbar Hashemi Rafsanjani to be barred from running for a third presidential term.

=== 2017–18 Iranian protests ===
During the 2017–18 Iranian protests, Ahmadinejad criticized the current government of Iran and later supreme leader Ali Khamenei.

=== 2022 Russian invasion of Ukraine ===
On 2 March 2022, Ahmadinejad expressed his support for Ukraine and the President of Ukraine Volodymyr Zelenskyy during the 2022 Russian invasion of Ukraine. On Twitter, he stated that Iran stands with Ukraine and expressed his admiration of the Ukrainian resistance while claiming that "the resistance uncovered the Satanic plots of enemies of mankind". He also warned the President of Russia Vladimir Putin that if he failed to stop the invasion, he would have "no achievement" to show for it, only remorse. Ahmadinejad's views on the Russian invasion are in stark contrast to the official pro-Russian stance of the Government of Iran, which blamed NATO and the United States for instigating the war.

=== U.S. sanctions ===
On 19 August 2023, following a prisoner swap between Iran and the United States, the United States Department of the Treasury sanctioned Ahmadinejad under Executive Order 14078 in September for his involvement in detaining several U.S. citizens. According to the Treasury Department, Ahmadinejad had provided material support to the Ministry of Intelligence and Security and during his presidency was involved with the detention of Robert Levinson and three U.S. hikers by appointing Gholam-Hossein Mohseni-Eje'i and Heydar Moslehi in 2005 and 2009 as the Minister of Intelligence respectively, who oversaw the detention of U.S. citizens during their tenures. Ahmadinejad was also being considered for further sanctions under Executive Order 13599.

=== 2024 presidential election ===
On 2 June, Ahmadinejad expressed interest in running in the election and applied to be considered as a candidate. However, he was disqualified from running on 9 June.

=== 2026 Iran war ===
On 28 February 2026, the first day of the 2026 Iran war, reports emerged that a house belonging to Ahmadinejad in Narmak, Tehran was struck and allegedly destroyed; the attack killed three members of the IRGC who were serving as his bodyguards. He was originally reported as killed in the strikes; however, later reports contradicted this. His freedom of movement had been restricted by the authorities after the 2025–2026 Iranian protests, but the airstrike caused him to escape the official restrictions on his movements according to The Atlantic. A New York Times report in May 2026, as summarized by other outlets, said that U.S. and Israeli officials had discussed a plan to free Ahmadinejad from house arrest and potentially support him as a post-Khamenei leader. The report was met with skepticism, and The Guardian noted that the plans were widely viewed as implausible or as possible disinformation. In July, the New York Times reported that Ahmadinejad had met with Israeli intelligence officers in Guatemala and Hungary to discuss the plans, which eventually fell through. On 6 July, he was spotted at the state funeral of Ali Khamenei.

== Party affiliation ==
Ahmadinejad had been an active and prominent member of the right-wing Islamic Society of Engineers since its establishment until 2005. As of 2014, he was still a member of the party but had not been active since 2005. He was also a founding member of the Society of Devotees of the Islamic Revolution, but left in 2011.

Since 2005, Ahmadinejad had introduced himself as non-partisan, even anti-party and did not try to gain support of political parties despite being supported by the conservative camp. A National Democratic Institute report published in 2009 stated that Ahmadinejad is a self-described "principlist".

== Awards and honors ==
- Iran:
  - Order of Islamic Revolution (2005) (automatic upon taking presidential office)
- Benin:
  - Grand Cross of the National Order of Benin (2013)
- Cuba:
  - Honorary doctorate in political science from University of Havana (2012)
- Lebanon:
  - Honorary doctorate in political science from Lebanese University (2010)
- Nicaragua:
  - Order of Augusto César Sandino, Batalla de San Jacinto, 1st Class (2007)
  - Order of Rubén Darío (2007)
- Venezuela:
  - Collar of the Order of the Liberator (2006)

== Public image ==
Ahmadinejad was known for his vulgarism, undiplomatic language and usage of slang terms. He was active on Twitter, where he engaged his followers primarily in English and tweets about sports, the United States, and current events.

According to a poll conducted by Information and Public Opinion Solutions LLC (iPOS) in March 2016, Ahmadinejad was the least popular political figure in Iran. He had 57% approval and 39% disapproval ratings, thus a +18% net popularity.

In 2017, polls conducted by Center for International and Security Studies at Maryland (CISSM) and IranPoll with ±3.2% margin of error shows his approval rating as follows:

Date	Very favorable	Somewhat favorable	Somewhat unfavorable	Very unfavorable	Don't recognize the name	DK/NA
July 2014	34%	33%	14.0%	16.0%	1.0%	3.0%
August 2015	27.5% ▼	33.5% ▲	13.0% ▼	22.8% ▲	0.2%	3.0%
January 2016	24.2% ▼	32.8% ▼	15.0% ▲	23.9% ▲	0.4%	3.7%
June 2016	28.0% ▲	37.3% ▲	14.9% ▼	16.1% ▼	0.4%	3.3%
December 2016	27.2% ▼	33.6% ▼	13.9% ▼	19.5% ▲	0.4%	5.4%

An independent poll conducted for IranWire by Stasis in October 2020 found that 37% of respondents would vote for Ahmadinejad if he could be a candidate for the upcoming 2021 Iranian presidential election. This was the highest percentage among all the potential nominees, largely ahead of his rival Mohammad Bagher Ghalibaf, who came second with 10%.

== Electoral history ==
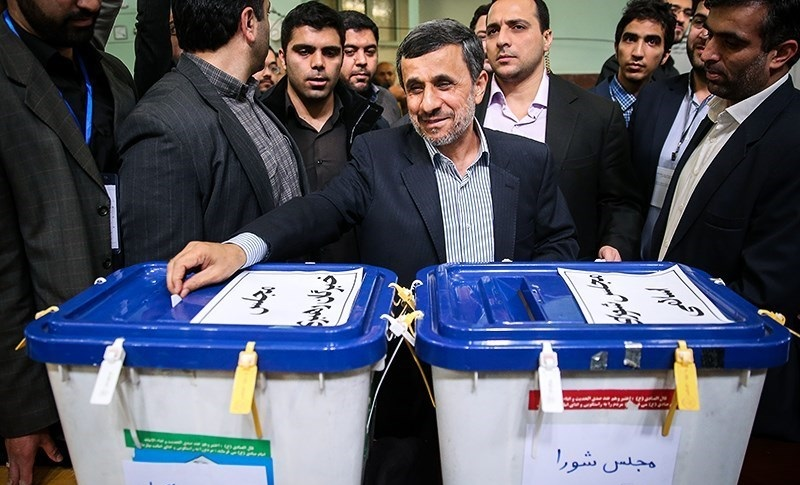
Ahmadinejad casting his vote in 2016 elections

Year	Election	Votes	%	Rank	Notes
1999	City Council of Tehran				Lost
2000	Parliament	280,046	9.55	68th	Lost
2005	President	5,711,696	19.43	2nd	Went to run-off
2005	President run off	▲17,284,782	▲61.69	1st	Won
2009	President	▲24,527,516	▲62.63	1st	Won
2017	President	—N/a			Disqualified
2021	President	—N/a			Disqualified
2024	President	—N/a			Disqualified

== Personal life ==
Ahmadinejad is married, and has one daughter and two sons. His elder son married a daughter of Esfandiar Rahim Mashaei in 2008.

Supporters of Ahmadinejad consider him a simple man who leads a modest life. As president, he wanted to continue living in the same house in Tehran his family had been living in until his security advisers insisted that he should move. Ahmadinejad had the antique Persian carpets in the Presidential palace sent to a carpet museum, and opted instead to use inexpensive carpets. He was said to have refused the VIP seat on the presidential plane, and that he eventually replaced it with a cargo plane instead. Upon gaining Iran's presidency, Ahmadinejad held his first cabinet meeting in the Imam Reza shrine at Mashhad, an act perceived as "pious". He also used to lay an extra place for the 12th Imam at his weekly cabinet briefings.

== Published works ==
A small corpus of Persian-language political and ideological works, consisting primarily of collected speeches, letters, and thematic statements was produced during Ahmadinejad's presidency:

Year	Original title (Persian)	English title
2007	تجلی هویت ایرانی در نیویورک	Manifestation of Iranian Identity in New York
2008	مهدویت و صلح کل: گفتارهایی از دکتر محمود احمدی‌نژاد پیرامون امام عصر (عج)	Mahdism and Universal Peace: Sayings on the Imam of the Age
2008	دیپلماسی‌نامه: نامه‌های رئیس‌جمهوری اسلامی ایران به سران کشورها، مردم آمریکا و پاپ بندیکت شانزدهم	The Diplomacy Book: Letters of the President of the Islamic Republic of Iran
2009	دولت ایرانی–اسلامی: سیری در مبانی و مؤلفه‌های تکوین دولت بومی در آرای دکتر محمود احمدی‌نژاد	The Iranian–Islamic State: Foundations of Indigenous Governance
2009	عدل و صلح: گفتارهای رئیس‌جمهوری اسلامی ایران در چهارمین سفر رسمی به آمریکا	Justice and Peace: Speeches during the Fourth Official Visit to the United States

== See also ==
- 2006 Iranian sumptuary law controversy
- Advisors to the president: Hamid Mowlana, Mohammad-Ali Ramin, Ali Akbar Javanfekr
- Ayatollah Mohammad-Taqi Mesbah-Yazdi
- Politics of Iran
- Mahmoud Ahmadinejad and Israel
- Electoral history of Mahmoud Ahmadinejad
- Foreign policy of the Mahmoud Ahmadinejad administration
- Controversies of Mahmoud Ahmadinejad
- Iran So Far (A Lonely Island Digital Short)

== Notes ==
Political offices
New district	Governor of Ardabil Province; 1993–1997	Succeeded by Hamid Tahayi
Preceded by Mohammad-Hossein Moghimi; Acting	Mayor of Tehran; 2003–2005	Succeeded by Ali Saeedlou; Acting
Preceded by Mohammad Khatami	President of Iran; 2005–2013	Succeeded by Hassan Rouhani
Party political offices
New title Organization established	Head of Alliance of Builders of Islamic Iran's Election Headquarters; 2003 local elections	Succeeded by Hossein Fadaei
Diplomatic posts
Preceded by Abdelaziz Bouteflika	Chairperson of the Group of 15; 2006–2010	Succeeded by Mahinda Rajapaksa
Preceded by Mohamed Morsi	Secretary General of the Non-Aligned Movement; 2012–2013	Succeeded by Hassan Rouhani
