= Davoud Ahmadinejad =

Iranian politician (1950–2017)

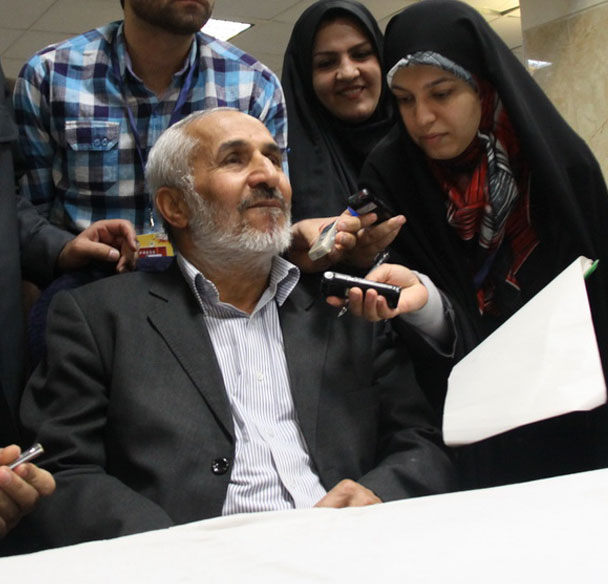
Ahmadinejad in the 2013 presidential election

Davoud Ahmadinejad (Persian: داواحمدی‌نژاد; 24 September 1952 in Aradan – 4 October 2017 in Tehran) was an Iranian politician and older brother of former Iranian president Mahmoud Ahmadinejad and Parvin Ahmadinejad. After the election of his brother as president in 2005, he was appointed as the head of the Presidential Inspection Commission. On 4 October 2017, he died in Tehran at the age of 67.
