= Controversies of Mahmoud Ahmadinejad =

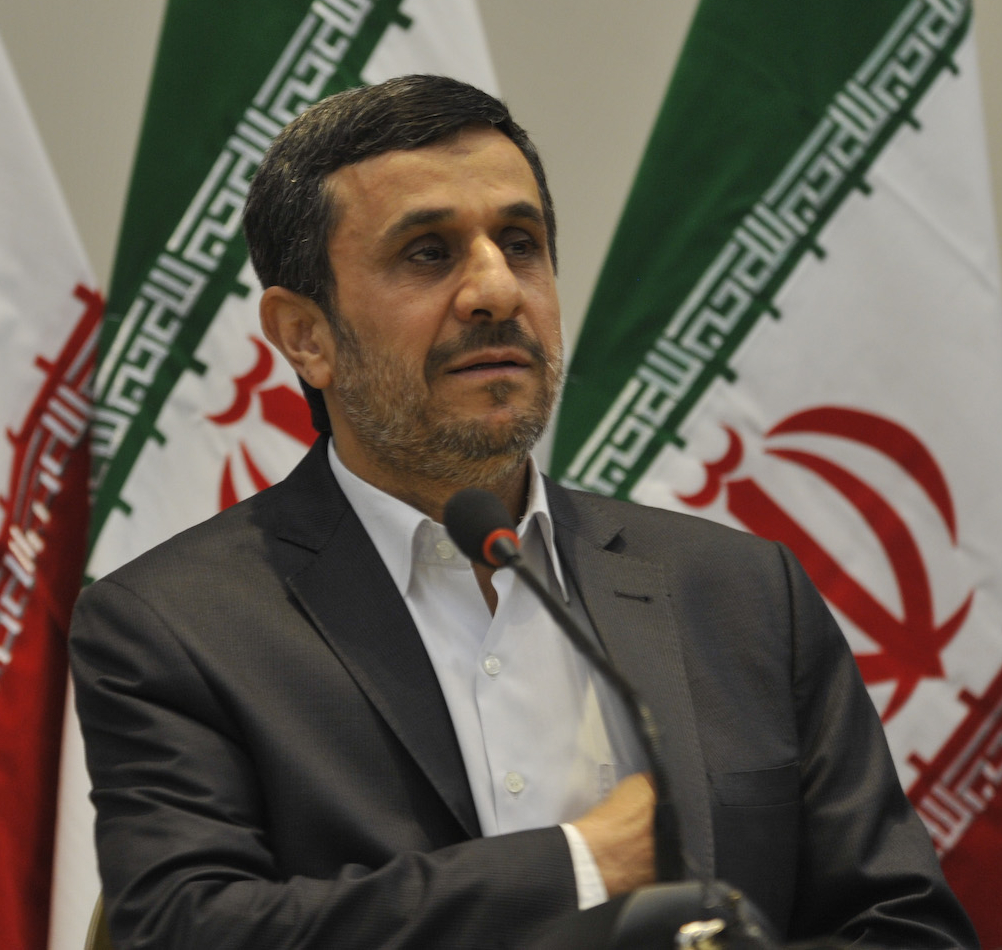
Mahmoud Ahmadinejad, the president of the Islamic Republic of Iran, at the United Nations Conference on Sustainable Development in Rio de Janeiro, Brazil.

Controversies of the former Iranian President Mahmoud Ahmadinejad included criticism after his election victory on June 29, 2005.

== Early student activism ==
According to Iran Focus, soon after attending Elm-o Sanaat University in 1975 to study engineering, Ahmadinejad was caught up in the Islamic Revolution of Ayatollah Ruhollah Khomeini. Ahmadinejad founded the Islamic Student Association at his university. By 1979, he became a representative of Office for Strengthening of Unity Between Universities and Theological Seminaries, later known as OSU. The OSU was organized by Ayatollah Mohammad Beheshti, one of Khomeini's top advisors. Members of the OSU central council, including Ahmadinejad, Ibrahim Asgharzadeh, Mohsen (Mahmoud) Mirdamadi, Mohsen Kadivar, Mohsen Aghajari, and Abbas Abdi, were regularly received by Khomeini himself. The OSU leadership played a key role in the crackdown on dissident university professors and students during the Islamic Cultural Revolution of 1980. Many professors and students who did not support Khomeini were arrested and executed.

In voting for storming the US embassy, Ahmadinejad objected, arguing that the protest ought to be directed at the Soviet embassy, but they were outvoted. Ahmadinejad has said that he did not support the embassy takeover until Ayatollah Ruhollah Khomeini endorsed it. The endorsement came late on November 4, 1979, the day the embassy was seized.

According to al-Jazeera, when OSU leaders proposed taking over the US embassy in 1979, Ahmadinejad proposed taking over the Soviet embassy at the same time.

== Kurdish-Austrian accusations ==
Peter Pilz, an Austrian politician and former spokesman of the Austrian Green Party, has alleged Ahmadinejad possibly had a hand in international assassinations ordered by the Iranian government against political opposition groups, including a 1989 assassination of exiled Kurdish leader Ebdulrehman Qasimlo and two of his associates in Vienna. After Ahmadinejad's election to presidency, in early July 2005, Pilz passed his documents about his claims to the Austrian Interior ministry, which "were then forwarded to the state prosecutor's office."

This allegation has been denied by several sources in Iran, including Saeed Hajjarian, a political opponent of Ahmadinejad. Also notable among the deniers, is Ali Rabiee, the intelligence advisor to the reformist President Khatami, who stated "during the mentioned accident happened, I was present in action regions of northwest and western Iran, and at that time Mr. Ahmadinejad was only involved at the civil construction work in the governing offices of Maku and the province". At the same time, the allegation has been echoed by a spokesman for the People's Mujahedin of Iran, an opposition group in exile.

Reuters has mentioned that information [Pilz] received from an "extraordinarily credible" informer, an Iranian journalist living in France who Pilz calls only "witness D". [...] Witness D's information came from one of the alleged gunmen, who contacted Witness D in 2001 but later drowned, Pilz said. Supporters of Ahmadinejad have questioned the credibility of such information, have mentioned that Pilz is a Jew, and have called the media reporting these to be "Zionist media." Hamid Reza Asefi, the spokesman of the Iranian Ministry of Foreign Affairs has said that, "The charges are so self-evidently false they are not worthy of response. […] We advise the Europeans not to fall into the trap of the Zionist media and to separate their interests from America and the Zionist entity (referring to the state of Israel)."

== Alleged election fraud ==
During the Iranian presidential election of 2005, some people, including Mehdi Karroubi, a reformist candidate who ranked third in the election, alleged that a network of mosques, the Islamic Revolutionary Guard Corps, and Basij militia forces, have been illegally used to generate and mobilize support for Ahmadinejad. Karroubi has explicitly alleged that Mojtaba Khamenei, a son of the Supreme Leader Ayatollah Khamenei, is involved. Ahmadinejad's supporters consider these to be false allegations. Furthermore, Khamenei has written to Karroubi stating that his allegations are "below his dignity" and "will result in a crisis"; in Iran, which he will not allow. As a reply, Karroubi resigned from all his political posts, including his positions as an adviser to the Supreme Leader and as a member of the Expediency Discernment Council, both of which he had been appointed to directly by Khamenei. Akbar Hashemi Rafsanjani, Ahmadinejad's rival in the second round, has also pointed to what he claims are "organized and unjust" interventions conducted by "guiding" the votes, and has supported Karroubi's complaint. Rafsanjani also alleged a "dirty tricks" campaign had "illegally" propelled Ahmadinejad into the presidency, an allegation which he strongly denies. In the same statement, Rafsanjani stated that he would only appeal the election results to "God", and recommended accepting the results and "assisting" the new president-elect.

Some political groups, including the reformist party Islamic Iran Participation Front (IIPF), allege that Ahmadinejad received illegal support and advertising activities from supervisors selected by the Guardian Council who should have remained nonpartisan according to the election law. Also, the reformist newspaper Shargh pointed out an announcement by Movahhedi Kermani, the official representative of the Supreme Leader in the Islamic Revolutionary Guard Corps, who was quoted as saying, "vote for a person who keeps to the minimum in his advertisements and doesn't lavish," which uniquely pointed to Ahmadinejad, whose supporters touted as being not wealthy.

== Support for Navvab Safavi ==
On 10 January 2006, Ahmadinejad declared that his government is following the "religious mission" initiated by Navvab Safavi, a Shi'a cleric who assassinated the historian and author Ahmad Kasravi in 1946 for "insulting Islam." In 2001, Mohammad Taghi Mesbah Yazdi, Ahmadinejad's ideological mentor, praised Safavi and encouraged Muslims in taking similar steps against the "enemies of Islam."

== Denial of the Holocaust ==
Mahmoud Ahmadinejad has issued a number of statements claiming The Holocaust as is commonly accepted is "a myth" and "a lie". His words have been publicly repudiated by world leaders from many countries including the United States, the United Kingdom, Germany, France, and others, including Iranian academics and expatriates.

In a speech given at the Columbia University on Sep, 24, 2007, Ahmadinejad stated that he did not deny the Holocaust, but didn't see what was wrong with asking questions about it.

In September 2009, in response to the international outrage, Ahmadinejad was reported to say that the angering of "professional man-slayers is a source of pride for us and will not stand in our way."

== Banning of Western music ==
In December 2005, President Ahmadinejad banned Western and "offensive" music from state-run radio and television stations. The ban follows a ruling in October by the Supreme Cultural Revolutionary Council to ban Western songs from Iranian airwaves.

Popular forms of Western music (hip-hop, rock, jazz) have been banned in Iran for many years, since the days of Khomeini. At the same time, some forms of western music, such as classical music, are regularly aired on state radios.

== Relations with the foreign press ==
On 16 January 2006, Cable News Network (CNN) was temporarily banned in Iran by the Iranian Ministry of Culture, after misreporting the remarks by President Mahmoud Ahmadinejad made during a press conference held on 14 January 2006. The president, talking to domestic and foreign reporters, said the peaceful use of nuclear energy is a right which Iran cannot be denied. However, a CNN interpreter incorrectly quoted Ahmadinejad as saying "the use of nuclear weapons is Iran's right." CNN later apologised for its mistake. Ahmadinejad allowed CNN to resume broadcasting on 17 January 2006 after the apology. In his letter to the Minister of Culture, he wrote 'We believe that accurate dissemination of news and information is necessary for political growth and awareness as well as effective interaction among nations in today's world.

Since the Iranian Revolution, no Iranian reporters have been allowed to enter the United States or take part in a press conference of the U.S. President. Reporters employed by the state-run Islamic Republic of Iran Broadcasting (IRIB) have only been allowed to cover United Nations events and are only able to travel within a 17-mile (27.4-kilometer) radius of New York City. For this reason several IRIB reporters criticised President Ahmadinejad on his support for CNN.

== Blocking of major websites ==
A campaign led by Ahmadinejad attempts to free the country of Western cultural influences, via the Internet. Human rights groups, YouTube and b3ta are amongst the major Web sites blocked. Reporters Without Borders called Iran, along with 13 other countries, "enemies of the Internet" in November 2006.

Iran has about 23 million Internet users which is the highest number of web users in the Middle East. The country also has more than 100,000 bloggers, some of which are substitutes for Iran's suppressed, reformist press.

Critics accuse Iran of using filtering technology to censor more sites than any country, except the People's Republic of China. Until now, targets have been mainly linked to opposition groups or those deemed "immoral" under Iran's Islamic legal code. Some news sites, such as the BBC's Persian service, are also blocked.

== Eschatology ==
Ahmadinejad's religious beliefs in the imminent return of the "occulted" Shi'a Imam Muhammad al-Mahdi have alarmed some Western commentators. In particular, remarks reportedly made after his speech before the United Nations General Assembly have created concern (translated):(www.ahmadinejad.ir)

On the last day when I was speaking before the assembly, one of a country's group told me that when I started to say "In the name of God the almighty and merciful," he saw a light around me, and I was placed inside this aura. I felt it myself.

I felt the atmosphere suddenly change, and for those 27 or 28 minutes, the leaders of the world did not blink. When I say they didn't bat an eyelid, I'm not exaggerating because I was looking at them. And they were rapt.

It seemed as if a hand was holding them there and had opened their eyes to receive the message from the Islamic republic.

Former CIA officer Robert Baer said, in the context of evaluating a nuclear strike on Iran, that Ahmadinejad and others in the Iranian government are "apocalyptic Shiites." He continues, "If you’re sitting in Tel Aviv and you believe they’ve got nukes and missiles — you’ve got to take them out. These guys are nuts and there's no reason to back off."

Some have conjectured that his actions are strictly a means of bolstering his standing among devout Muslims, and cannot be interpreted as the existence of an "apocalyptic Shiite" group.

== Columbia University ==
On September 24, 2007, Ahmadinejad appeared at Columbia University. President Lee Bollinger received harsh criticism for inviting such a controversial figure to Columbia. He responded in a statement saying "The event will be part of the annual World Leaders Forum, the University-wide initiative intended to further Columbia’s longstanding tradition of serving as a major forum for robust debate, especially on global issues," and also for closing the area to outside protesters.

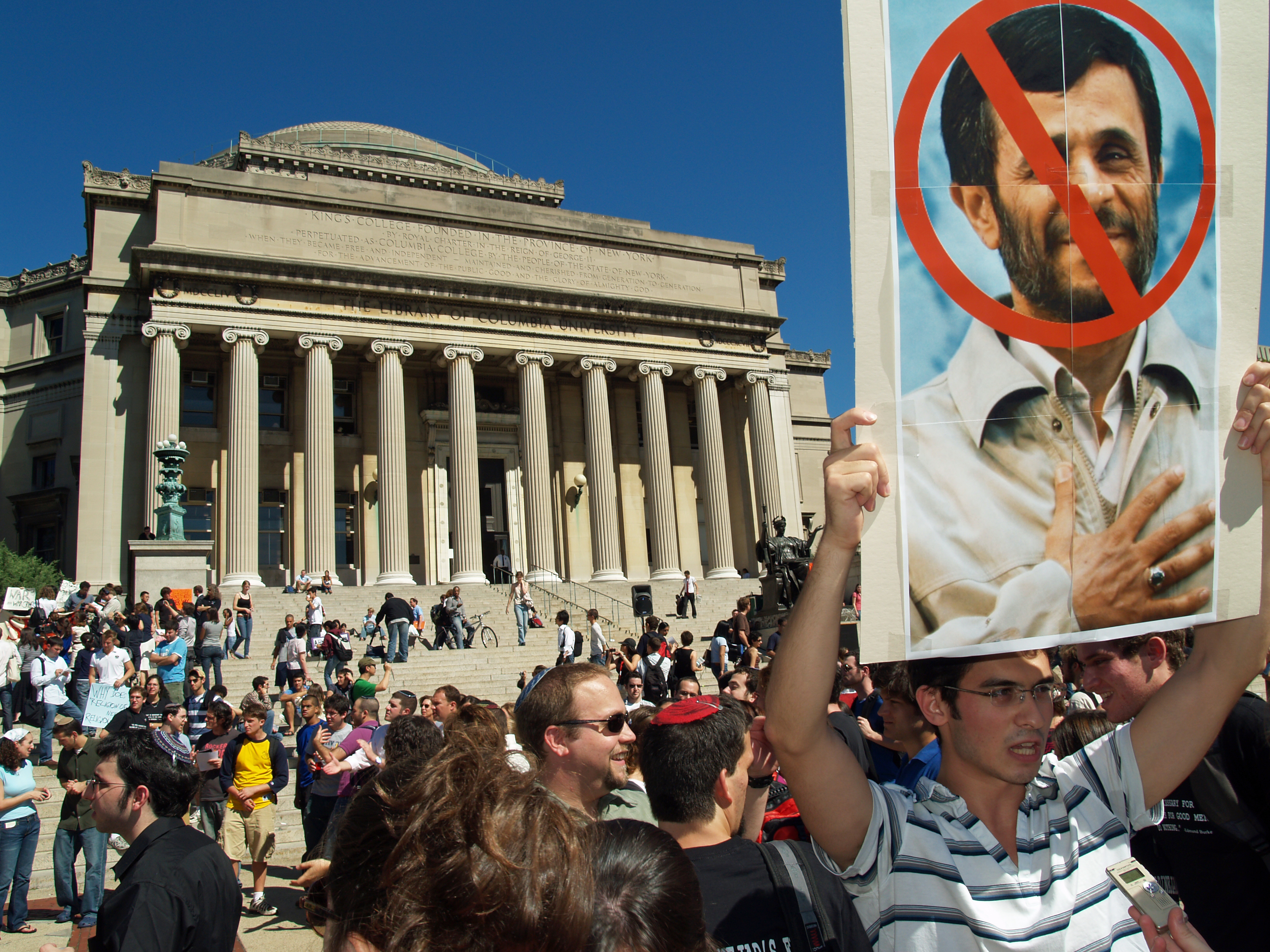
Students protest Ahmadinejad's visit.

Columbia University's president, Lee Bollinger, introduced Ahmadinejad with a combative tone: "Mr. President you exhibit all the signs of a petty and cruel dictator." Ahmadinejad responded by opening his speech saying that his introduction was "an insult to information and knowledge of the audience there." Some of his arguments were met with derisive laughter, for example "... in Iran we don't have homosexuals, like in your country. We don't have that in our country. In Iran we do not have this phenomenon. I don't know who told you that we have it." An aide later claimed that he was misrepresented and was saying that "compared to American society, we don't have many homosexuals".

He however was applauded when he spoke about the Palestinian peoples' right to self-determination. He spoke on the issue of the September 11, 2001 attacks that "if the root causes of 9/11 are examined properly, why it happened, what caused it, what conditions led to it, who was involved, and put together how to understand and how to prevent the crisis in Iraq, fix the problem in Afghanistan and Iraq combined". He also stated "the most liberated women in the world are the women in Iran". Despite having previously called the Holocaust a "myth", Ahmadinejad stated "granted this happened, what does this have to do with the Palestinian people?" He used Koranic quotes to criticize the Bush administration and the bombings of Nagasaki and Hiroshima. He also described Iran's nuclear ambitions as peaceful measures aimed at increasing Iran's energy production. Outside the convention many protested his presence there, most of them supporters of Jewish organizations .

== See also ==
- Council for Spreading Mahmoud Ahmadinejad's Thoughts
