= Electoral history of Mahmoud Ahmadinejad =

List of elections featuring Mahmoud Ahmadinejad as a candidate

This is a summary of the electoral history of Mahmoud Ahmadinejad, an Iranian Principlist politician who was President of Iran (2005–2013) and Mayor of Tehran (2003–2005).

== City Council election ==
In 1998, Mahmoud Ahmadinejad registered for City Council of Tehran election. He failed to win a seat.

== Parliament election ==
=== 2000 ===
In 2000, Ahmadinejad registered for Iranian Parliament election from Tehran. He was supperted by Islamic Coalition Party, Combatant Clergy Association and was listed in Coalition of Followers of the Line of the Imam and Leader electoral list. Ahmadinejad lost the election. He received 280,046 out of 2,931,113 votes and was ranked 68th.

== Mayoral of Tehran ==
On 3 May 2003, City Council of Tehran elected him as Mayor by a vote of 12 to 1, with 2 abstentions.

Candidate	Votes	%
Mahmoud Ahmadinejad	12 / 15	80

== Presidential elections ==
=== 2005 ===
In the first round, Ahmadinejad finished second with 5,711,696 votes (19.43%). In the second round, Ahmadinejad won with 17,284,782 votes (61.69%).

=== 2009 ===
Ahmadinejad won with 24,527,516 votes (62.63%).
