= Parvin Ahmadinejad =

Iranian politician (born 1962)

- پروين احمدی‌نژاد
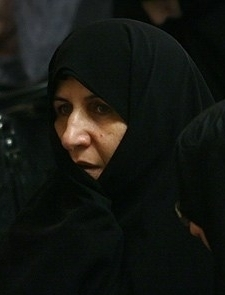
- Ahmadinejad in 2020

Member of City Council of Tehran
- In office 29 April 2007 – 3 September 2013

Personal details
- Born: Parvin Sabbaghian; 3 February 1962 (age 64) Aradan, Iran
- Party: Alliance of Builders of Islamic Iran
- Other political affiliations: Coalition of the Pleasant Scent of Servitude
- Spouse: Sardar Habibi
- Relatives: Davoud Ahmadinejad (brother); Mahmoud Ahmadinejad (brother)
- Education: Islamic Azad University Central Tehran Branch

Parvin Ahmadinejad (Persian: پروين احمدی‌نژاد; born 3 February 1962) is an Iranian politician. She is the sister of former President, Mahmoud Ahmadinejad.

== Career ==
Ahmedinejad served as an advisor at the presidential women office. She was a member of City Council of Tehran from 2007 to 2013.

She lost her bid for a seat from Garmsar and Aradan in the nation's parliamentary elections in 2012. She was not reelected in 2013 local elections.

=== Electoral history ===
Year	Election	Votes	%	Rank	Notes
2006	City Council of Tehran	242,501	14.64	8th	Won
2012	Parliament	15,552	37.56	2nd	Lost
2013	City Council of Tehran	▼35,339	▼1.57	97th	Lost

== See also ==
- Davoud Ahmadinejad
