= Heather Rogers =

British media and defamation lawyer

Heather Rogers KC (3 June 1959 – 18 October 2023) was an English barrister known for her specialisation in media law. She died from a pulmonary embolism at age 64.

Along with Richard Rampton, she represented Deborah Lipstadt and her publisher Penguin Books against accusations from David Irving of libel after Lipstadt said that Irving was a Holocaust denier in her book Denying the Holocaust, in the case of Irving v Penguin Books Ltd.

== Early life and education ==
Heather Rogers was born in 1959 in Wolverhampton, United Kingdom to George Rogers, a carpenter and construction worker, and Olga Ingram, a secretary. She demonstrated academic proficiency early in her career and was educated at Wolverhampton Girls' High School. Later, Rogers furthered her studies at the London School of Economics, graduating in 1980 with a first-class honors degree in law (LLB). She was called to the Bar in 1983, achieving a notably high score.

== Career ==
Rogers' legal career was characterized by her involvement in major media law chambers. She began her career under the tutelage of Geoffrey Robertson KC at Dr Johnson's Buildings, an appointment that broke the traditional Oxbridge recruitment trend. Her professional journey included roles at Robert Maxwell's London Daily News, 10 South Square, Matrix Chambers, Doughty Street Chambers, and 1 Brick Court.

In 2019, Rogers rejoined Doughty Street Chambers to lead the media team.

As a legal practitioner, Rogers held positions as a bencher of Middle Temple and a recorder in the south eastern circuit, focusing on criminal cases. She played a significant role in the development of the Defamation Bill, collaborating with Lord Lester of Herne Hill, which led to the Defamation Act of 2013. This legislation introduced critical reforms, such as restricting libel claims by corporations and establishing a statutory defense for publications in the public interest.

Throughout her career, Rogers was involved in several high-profile legal cases. She represented defendant publishers in notable lawsuits, including Spycatcher, Esther Rantzen vs. Mirror Group Newspapers, and Elton John vs. MGN. Her work in Derbyshire County Council v Times Newspapers set a precedent that government bodies cannot sue for libel. Additionally, Rogers represented claimants in significant cases, such as Roman Polanski's libel action against Vanity Fair.

Beyond her courtroom activities, Rogers was engaged in advocacy for free speech. She served as a trustee of Article 19 and was a director of the Campaign for Freedom of Information. Rogers also co-authored the legal textbook Duncan and Neill on Defamation.

== Personal life ==
Despite her professional accomplishments, Rogers maintained a connection to her working-class background. She was married to Julie Edwards, a television and film producer, and enjoyed the arts, theatre, music, and spending time in Suffolk.

== Bibliography ==
- Duncan and Neill on Defamation (2020)
