= Irving v Penguin Books Ltd =

2000 English libel case

Irving v Penguin and Lipstadt
- Court: High Court of Justice (Queen's Bench Division)
- Full case name: Irving v Penguin Books Limited, Deborah E. Lipstadt
- Decided: 11 April 2000
- Citation: (2000) EWHC QB 115
- Transcript: hdot.org/trial-materials/trial-transcripts/

Case history
- Subsequent action: Application for appeal denied

Court membership
- Judge sitting: Mr Justice Gray

Case opinions
- ... the evidence supports the following propositions: that the shooting of the Jews in the East was systematic and directed from Berlin with the knowledge and approval of Hitler; that there were gas chambers at several of the Operation Reinhard camps and that (as Irving during the trial admitted) hundreds of thousands of Jews were killed in them and that there were gas chambers at Auschwitz, where hundreds of thousands more Jews were gassed to death. It follows that it is my conclusion that Irving's denials of these propositions were contrary to the evidence... Irving has for his own ideological reasons persistently and deliberately misrepresented and manipulated historical evidence... therefore the defence of justification succeeds.

David Irving v Penguin Books and Deborah Lipstadt is a case in English law against American historian Deborah Lipstadt and her British publisher Penguin Books, filed in the High Court of Justice by the British author David Irving in 1996, asserting that Lipstadt had libelled him in her 1993 book Denying the Holocaust. The court ruled that Irving's claim of libel relating to Holocaust denial was not valid under English defamation law because Lipstadt's claim that he had deliberately distorted evidence had been shown to be substantially true. English libel law puts the burden of proof on the defence, meaning that it was up to Lipstadt and her publisher to prove that her claims of Irving's deliberate misrepresentation of evidence to conform to his ideological viewpoints were substantially true.

Lipstadt hired British lawyer Anthony Julius while Penguin hired libel experts Kevin Bays and Mark Bateman of media law firm Davenport Lyons. Richard J. Evans, an established historian, was hired by the defence to serve as an expert witness. Evans spent two years examining Irving's work, and presented evidence of Irving's misrepresentations, including evidence that Irving had knowingly used forged documents as source material. Of utmost importance was the role played by another expert witness for the defence, the Holocaust historian Christopher Browning. Upon mutual agreement, the case was argued as a bench trial before Justice Charles Gray, who produced a written judgment 349 pages long in favour of the defendants, in which he detailed Irving's systematic distortion of the historical record of the Holocaust and Hitler's role therein.

== History ==
In 1993, Free Press published Professor Deborah Lipstadt's book Denying the Holocaust: the Growing Assault on Truth and Memory. In it she described and condemned the phenomenon of Holocaust denial and referred to David Irving as a prominent Holocaust denier. One of the passages Irving later objected to was:

Irving is one of the most dangerous spokespersons for Holocaust denial. Familiar with historical evidence, he bends it until it conforms with his ideological leanings and political agenda. A man who is convinced that Britain's great decline was accelerated by its decision to go to war with Germany, he is most facile at taking accurate information and shaping it to confirm his conclusions. A review of his recent book, Churchill's War, which appeared in New York Review of Books, accurately analyzed his practice of applying a double standard of evidence. He demands "absolute documentary proof" when it comes to proving the Germans guilty, but he relies on highly circumstantial evidence to condemn the Allies. This is an accurate description not only of Irving's tactics, but of those of deniers in general.

In November 1994, Lipstadt had her first direct encounter with Irving at DeKalb College in Atlanta, while she was lecturing on Holocaust denial. Irving had listened to the lecture while sitting in the lecture hall and when it was over, did his best to disrupt Lipstadt by challenging her to a debate, waving about a large amount of money in his hands and announcing he had $1,000 to give to her or anyone who could find a written order from Hitler for the Holocaust. Lipstadt ignored Irving, despite his repeated attempts to draw her into a debate. After Lipstadt's lecture had ended, Irving announced that Lipstadt's refusal to debate with him or produce a written order from Hitler for the Holocaust, despite his promise to pay $1,000 on the spot, proved that her criticism of him in Denying the Holocaust was invalid and he handed out free copies of his Göring biography to Lipstadt's students.

=== Libel suits ===
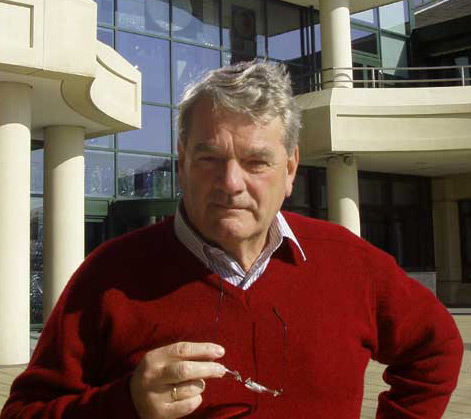
Irving at the National Archives of the United Kingdom, 2003

On 5 September 1996, Irving filed a libel suit concerning Lipstadt's book in English court. He named in his suit Lipstadt and Penguin Books, whose Plume division had published a British edition of her book. Irving also sued Holocaust historian Gitta Sereny for libel for an article she had written about him entitled "Spin Time for Hitler" in The Observer newspaper on 21 April 1996, although the case did not go to court. In letters of 25 and 28 October 1997, Irving threatened to sue John Lukacs for libel if he published his book, The Hitler of History, without removing certain passages highly critical of Irving's work. The American edition of The Hitler of History was published in 1997 with the allegedly libellous passages but because of Irving's legal threats, no British edition of The Hitler of History was published until 2001. When the latter was published, as a result of the threat of legal action by Irving, the passages containing the criticism of Irving's historical methods were expunged by the publisher, to the disappointment of many reviewers.

In her book, Denying the Holocaust, Lipstadt called Irving a Holocaust denier and falsifier, as well as a bigot, and wrote that he manipulated and distorted real documents. Irving claimed to have been libelled on the grounds that Lipstadt had falsely labelled him a Holocaust denier and falsely claimed that he had falsified evidence or deliberately misinterpreted it, by which false accusations his reputation as a historian was defamed. Though the author was American, Irving filed his suit in the English High Court, where the burden of proof in libel cases is on the defendant, unlike in the US where the burden is on the plaintiff. He was able to file the lawsuit in England because the book was published there (before 1996, if Irving had wished to sue Lipstadt, he would have had to launch his legal action in an American court; English libel law applies only to alleged acts of libel committed in England and Wales). As explained by the trial judge, Mr Justice Gray,

4.7 ... the burden of proving the defence of justification rests upon the publishers. Defamatory words are presumed under English law to be untrue. It is not incumbent on defendants to prove the truth of every detail of the defamatory words published: what has to be proved is the substantial truth of the defamatory imputations published about the claimant. As it is sometimes expressed, what must be proved is the truth of the sting of the defamatory charges made.

=== Legal issues ===
Irving's decision to file his lawsuit in the English courts gave him the upper hand by shifting the burden of proof. Under American libel law, a public figure who claims to have been libelled must prove that the statements in question are defamatory and false, and were made with actual malice or with reckless disregard for their truth or falsity. Reliance on reliable sources (even if they prove false) is a valid defence. English libel law requires only that the claimant show that the statements are defamatory. The burden of proof falls on the defendant to prove that the statements were substantially true and reliance on sources is irrelevant. If the defence could not prove the defamatory content of her words to be substantially true, they would be found guilty of libel. Lipstadt feared that such a verdict would confer legitimacy upon Irving's claims and felt compelled to defend herself. One commentator, who had expressed the opinion that Irving "could have been ignored", later wrote "Lipstadt had no choice but to defend herself in court".

To succeed with a justification defence, the defence would need to prove as substantially true all of the defamatory claims made by Lipstadt against Irving. The judge understood these claims to be,

1. that Irving is an apologist for and partisan of Hitler, who has resorted to the distortion of evidence; the manipulation and skewing of documents; the misrepresentation of data and the application of double standards to the evidence, in order to serve his own purpose of exonerating Hitler and portraying him as sympathetic towards the Jews;
2. that Irving is one of the most dangerous spokespersons for Holocaust denial, who has on numerous occasions denied that the Nazis embarked upon the deliberate planned extermination of Jews and has alleged that it is a Jewish deception that gas chambers were used by the Nazis at Auschwitz as a means of carrying out such extermination;
3. that Irving, in denying that the Holocaust happened, has misstated evidence; misquoted sources; falsified statistics; misconstrued information and bent historical evidence so that it conforms to his neo-fascist political agenda and ideological beliefs;
4. that Irving has allied himself with representatives of a variety of extremist and anti-Semitic groups and individuals and on one occasion agreed to participate in a conference at which representatives of terrorist organisations were due to speak;
5. that Irving, in breach of an agreement which he had made and without permission, removed and transported abroad certain microfiches of Goebbels's diaries, thereby exposing them to a real risk of damage;
6. that Irving is discredited as an historian.

=== Preparation ===
==== Defence ====
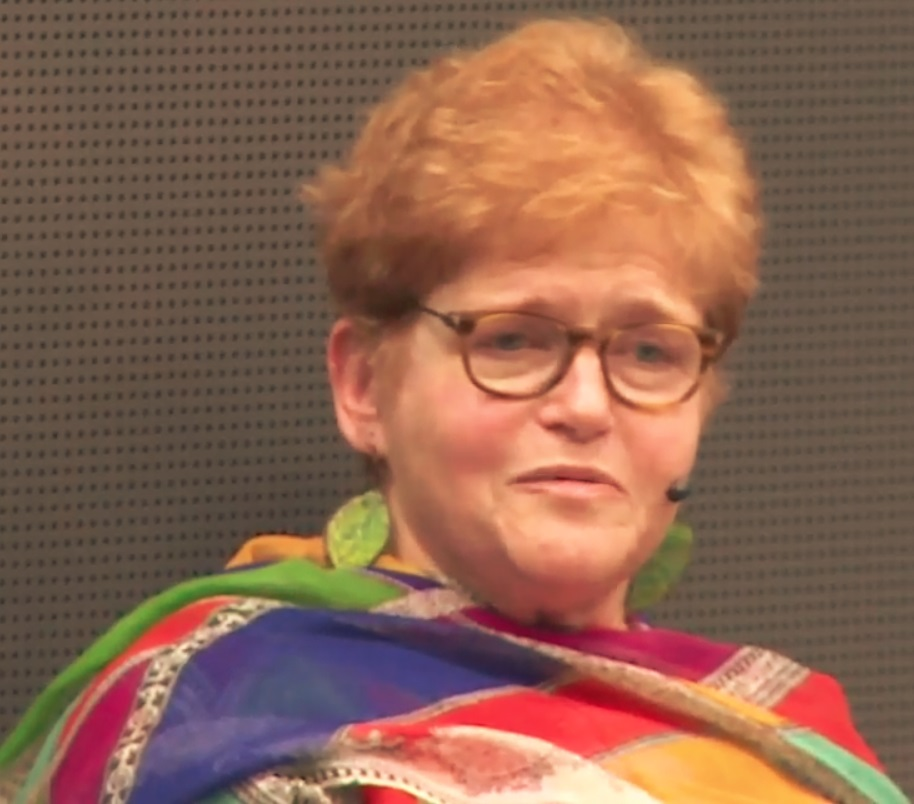
Deborah Lipstadt (2015)

Lipstadt hired the British solicitor Anthony Julius to present her case. Penguin hired Davenport Lyons libel specialists Kevin Bays and Mark Bateman. Together they briefed the libel barrister, Richard Rampton KC. Penguin also instructed Heather Rogers as junior barrister. Penguin knew that they were going to have to dig deep to defend against Irving's claims. Lipstadt's claims would need to be backed up by experts and Penguin would foot the bill, retaining Professor Richard J. Evans, historian and Professor of Modern History at Cambridge University, as their lead witness. As an expert witness, Evans was expected to prepare a report and to be cross-examined. Also working as expert witnesses were the American Holocaust historian Christopher Browning, the German historian Peter Longerich, the Dutch architectural expert Robert Jan van Pelt and the Political Science Professor Hajo Funke of the Free University of Berlin.

The legal strategy was to

1. Provide evidence that the Holocaust happened, with a specific focus on the evidence for: the existence and use of gas chambers; and a co-ordinated Nazi plan, directed by Hitler, for the extermination of Jews. The goal was not to prove the Holocaust, but to show that any reasonable and fair-minded historian would not doubt it, and that Irving must therefore not be reasonable or fair-minded.
2. Document Irving's political views and associations with extremist, neo-Nazi groups.
3. Examine Irving's work to see whether Irving did indeed falsify the historical record, as Lipstadt had claimed he did.

Van Pelt, Browning and Longerich were assigned to the first part. Funke wrote a report for the second and Evans the third.

The lawyers for Lipstadt (Mishcon de Reya) and Penguin (Davenport Lyons) worked closely, for the most part agreeing on the way to deal with the claim. One minor setback came when Penguin and their lawyers Davenport Lyons were keen that the information provided by the experts they had instructed be incorporated in an amended defence (which Heather Rogers drafted). Initially Mishcon were unpersuaded but Davenport Lyons were insistent, feeling that the amended document provided a clear statement of the strong evidence against Irving. The decision was eventually left to Richard Rampton and Heather Rogers as they would be presenting the case and both were in favour of amending; Mishcon relented.

The testimony of van Pelt and Evans proved to be the most substantial. During cross-examination, Irving was unable to undermine either Evans, who had been highly critical of his scholarship, or van Pelt, whose report concentrated on the evidence that contradicted the Holocaust deniers' arguments about Auschwitz Birkenau. Evans was assisted by two postgraduates, Thomas Skelton-Robinson and Nik Wachsmann, who acted as researchers; Evans and his students took 18 months to write a 740-page report, finishing it in the summer of 1999.

=== Settlement offers ===
A short time later, Irving privately approached Penguin and offered to drop them from his lawsuit if they would pull the book from publication in the UK and destroy all of the remaining copies, publicly disavow all of Lipstadt's conclusions and make a charitable donation of £500 in the name of Irving's daughter (who was disabled). He also suggested to Penguin that they keep any terms confidential because he had no intention of settling with Lipstadt. Bays and Bateman made clear that the publisher rejected his terms. Three weeks later, Irving officially offered to settle with both parties, the terms being that the book be withdrawn from circulation, both parties apologise and (each) make a £500 donation. Lipstadt instructed her lawyers to reject the offer. Irving later claimed without evidence that Penguin wanted to settle the case (not specifying whether this applied to one of his two "offers" or both of them) and were somehow pressured by Dr. Lipstadt not to; D. D. Guttenplan's book outlined how Penguin dismissed Irving for several reasons, including contempt for him and dismay over the certainty that the publisher would have been called by Lipstadt's lawyers as plaintiff advocates if they had settled the lawsuit.

== Trial ==
=== Testimony ===
==== Evans ====
Evans and his two assistants spent more than two years examining Irving's work. This research found that Irving had misrepresented historical evidence to support his prejudices. In his report and testimony, Evans suggested that in his view, Irving had knowingly used forged documents as sources, and that for this reason, Irving could not be regarded as a historian. His conclusions were that

Not one of [Irving's] books, speeches or articles, not one paragraph, not one sentence in any of them, can be taken on trust as an accurate representation of its historical subject. All of them are completely worthless as history, because Irving cannot be trusted anywhere, in any of them, to give a reliable account of what he is talking or writing about. ... if we mean by historian someone who is concerned to discover the truth about the past, and to give as accurate a representation of it as possible, then Irving is not a historian.

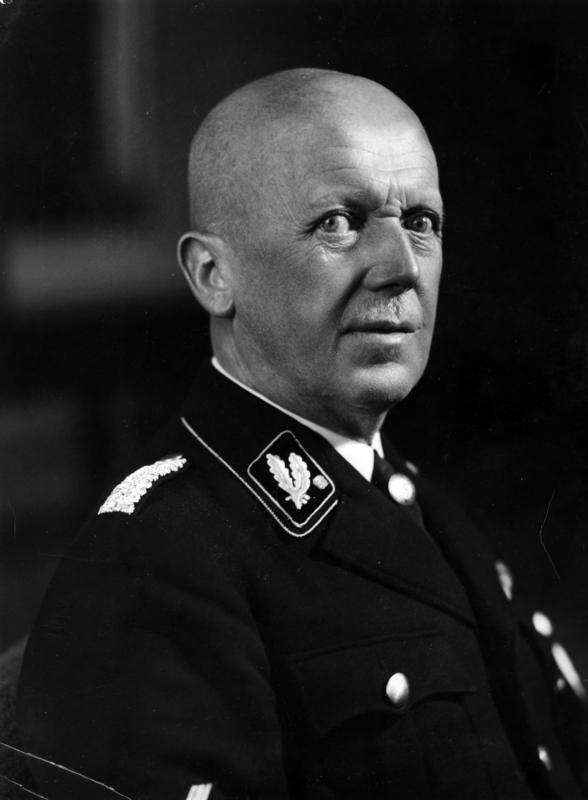
Hans Lammers, the Chief of the Reich Chancellery. A 1942 memo by him to the Justice Minister stating that Hitler wanted the "Jewish Question put on the back-burner" until after the war was one of the chief pieces of evidence for Irving during Lipstadt's libel trial in 2000.

During the trial, Evans was cross-examined by Irving. D.D. Guttenplan later wrote that the cross-examination of Evans by Irving contained a high degree of personal antagonism between the two men. Such was the degree of antagonism that Irving challenged Evans on very minor points, such as Evans doubting the fairness of a 1938 German plebiscite in which the Nazi regime received 98.8% of the vote. A subject that much engaged Irving and Evans in a debate was a 1942 memo by the Chief of the Reich Chancellory Hans Lammers to the Reich Justice Minister Franz Schlegelberger in which Lammers wrote that Hitler ordered him to put the "Jewish Question" on the "back-burner" until after the war. Evans chose to accept the interpretation of the memo put forward by Eberhard Jäckel in the 1970s; Irving chose to interpret the memo literally, and taunted Evans, saying "[i]t is a terrible problem, is it not, that we are faced with this tantalizing plate of crumbs and morsels of what should have provided the final smoking gun, and nowhere the whole way through the archives do we find even one item that we do not have to interpret or read between the lines of, but we do have in the same chain of evidence documents which... quite clearly specifically show Hitler intervening in the other sense?". In response, Evans stated "No, I do not accept that at all. It is because you want to interpret euphemisms as being literal and that is what the whole problem is. Every time there is a euphemism, Mr. Irving... or a camouflage piece of statement or language about Madagascar, you want to treat it as the literal truth, because it serves your purpose of trying to exculpate Hitler. That is part of... the way you manipulate and distort the documents".

In 2001, Evans described his impression of Irving after being cross-examined by him as "He [Irving] was a bit like a dim student who didn't listen. If he didn't get the answer he wanted, he just repeated the question."

==== Longerich ====
Longerich testified to the meaning of the often euphemistic language used by German officials during the war regarding the "Final Solution of the Jewish Question", and argued that from 1941 onwards, the term "resettlement in the East" was a metaphor for deportation to the death camps. During his exchanges with Irving, Longerich insisted quite firmly that the term "resettlement" was only a euphemism for extermination and nothing more, and used the Posen speech given by Himmler in October 1943 as a proof of the genocidal policy of the German state. Irving by contrast argued for a literal interpretation of the phrase "resettlement in the East".

==== Browning ====
During his testimony and a cross-examination by Irving, Browning countered Irving's suggestion that the last chapter of the Holocaust has yet to be written (implying there were grounds for doubting the reality of the Holocaust) by replying: "We are still discovering things about the Roman Empire. There is no last chapter in history."

Browning countered Irving's argument that the lack of a written Führer order proves the alleged non-occurrence of the Holocaust by arguing that, although no such order was ever written down, Hitler had almost certainly made statements to his leading subordinates indicating his wishes in regards to the Jews of Europe during the war, thus rendering the need for a written order irrelevant. Browning testified that several leading experts on Nazi Germany believe that there was no written Führer order for the "Final Solution of the Jewish Question", but no historian doubts the reality of the Holocaust. Browning went on to assert that Irving was attempting to falsely equate doubts about the existence of a written Führer order with doubts about the Holocaust. Browning used to support his thesis the example of Hitler's secret speech to his Gauleiters on 12 December 1941, in which Hitler strongly alluded to genocide as the "Final Solution".

Browning testified that the Madagascar Plan of 1940–41 was "fantastic" and "bizarre", but countered Irving's suggestion that this proves the alleged impossibility of the Holocaust by stating: "...I do think they took it seriously. It is fantastic, but of course, Auschwitz is fantastic, too". Browning testified that the Madagascar Plan was not "Hitler's pipe dream" as Irving claimed, and that "I would not call it a pipe dream, because I think, if England had surrendered, they would have tried to do it. They would have tried to implement it just as they tried to implement the Lublin reservation plan [the Nisko Plan] and just as they tried and succeeded in implementing the death camp plans."

Browning categorically rejected Irving's claim that there was no reliable statistical information on the size of the pre-war Jewish population in Europe or on the killing processes and argued that the only reason historians debate whether five or six million Jews were killed in the Holocaust is due to a lack of access to archives in the former Soviet Union. Likewise, Browning argued that it is possible to become soaked in human blood after shooting people at close range based on his research for his 1992 book Ordinary Men and dismissed Irving's argument that accounts of German personnel being soaked in blood were improbable because it is not possible to have a blood-soaked uniform after shooting people at close range.

Browning responded to Irving's claim that because Browning had done work for the Yad Vashem centre in Jerusalem that made him an "Israeli agent" and thereby compromised his scholarly abilities by stating: "If that was the case, then since I had been at the [US] Holocaust Museum, I would also have been an agent of the American government, and since I have received scholarships in Germany, I would be an agent of the German government, so I must be a very duplicitous fellow to be able to follow these regimes." Irving seemed anxious for Browning's approval, and Browning later recalled that Irving behaved as if the two of them were on "a joint journey of exploration and discovery."

==== Van Pelt ====
Robert Jan van Pelt, an architectural historian, was engaged by the defence as an expert witness. He prepared a 700-page report, in which he examined the evidence for the existence of the gas chambers at Auschwitz. He also defended himself on cross-examination. Irving floundered against van Pelt's deep knowledge of the mechanics of Auschwitz Birkenau. Rampton and van Pelt had bonded on a trip to Auschwitz with Rogers and Bateman and they had spent hours talking through Irving's claims. Van Pelt took the three lawyers and Deborah Lipstadt around Birkenau showing them how Irving's claims were false and the mistake he had made about the physical layout. He later adapted the report he wrote into book form.

==== Claimant ====
In the trial, Irving represented himself. He called the American Kevin B. MacDonald, an evolutionary psychologist, to testify on his behalf. Irving made much of the statement by the American historian Arno J. Mayer, who Irving went to pains to point out was both a Marxist and a man who would have been considered Jewish in Nazi racial theory, in his 1988 book Why Did the Heavens Not Darken?, that most of the people who died at Auschwitz were the victims of disease rather than murder. In response, Peter Longerich argued that Mayer did not deny the Holocaust in his book, and that he was simply wrong about more Jews dying of "natural" as opposed to "unnatural" causes of death at Auschwitz.

Irving also subpoenaed the diplomatic historian Donald Cameron Watt and the military historian John Keegan to testify in his case against Lipstadt; both men had refused an earlier offer to testify for Irving on their own and appeared to be very reluctant on the stand. Rather than focus on the defence's evidence against him, or on whether or not Lipstadt had defamed him, Irving seemed to focus mainly on his "right to free speech". In his closing statement, Irving claimed to have been a victim of an international, mostly Jewish, conspiracy for more than three decades.

== Ruling ==
The judgment was presented on 11 April 2000, although the lawyers had received the decision 24 hours earlier. To the large crowd assembled, the judge read portions of his written judgment.

The written judgment came out to 349 pages. Following an introduction and a discussion of the complaint, more than three-quarters of the written judgment is devoted to an analysis of all the evidence that was presented. Only then does the judge get to his findings on the evidence. The judge deems that "in the course of his prolonged cross-examination, Evans justified each and every one of the criticisms on which the Defendants have chosen to rely." On the issue of Auschwitz, the judge states "My conclusion is that the various categories of evidence do 'converge' in the manner suggested by the Defendants... Having considered the various arguments advanced by Irving to assail the effect of the convergent evidence relied upon by the Defendants, it is my conclusion that no objective, fair-minded historian would have serious cause to doubt that there were gas chambers at Auschwitz and that they were operated on a substantial scale to kill hundreds of thousands of Jews," and "it follows that it is my conclusion that Irving's denials of these propositions were contrary to the evidence." Furthermore, "the allegation that Irving is a racist is also established."

Ultimately, the judge ruled that the defence succeeded in proving everything they claimed in trial but for two assertions: that Irving had broken an agreement with the Moscow archives and mishandled the glass plates containing Goebbels' diaries, and that he hung a portrait of Hitler above his desk. However, the judge pointed out that "the charges against Irving that have been proved to be true are of sufficient gravity", and when taking that into account, adding those two claims mentioned above would "not have any material effect on Irving's reputation." The judge decided this in accordance with section 5 of the Defamation Act 1952, which states that a justification defence can succeed despite the failure to prove minor assertions.

The judge summarised his findings,

Irving has for his own ideological reasons persistently and deliberately misrepresented and manipulated historical evidence; that for the same reasons he has portrayed Hitler in an unwarrantedly favourable light, principally in relation to his attitude towards and responsibility for the treatment of the Jews; that he is an active Holocaust denier; that he is anti-Semitic and racist, and that he associates with right-wing extremists who promote neo-Nazism... therefore the defence of justification succeeds... It follows that there must be judgment for the Defendants.

== Further events ==
=== Appeal ===
Irving subsequently appealed to the Civil Division of the Court of Appeal. On 20 July 2001, his application for appeal was denied by Lords Justices Pill, Mantell, and Buxton.

=== Bankruptcy ===
In light of the evidence presented at the trial, a number of Irving's works that had previously escaped serious scrutiny were brought to public attention. He was also liable to pay all of the substantial costs of the trial (between one and two million pounds), which ruined him financially and forced him into bankruptcy in 2002.

=== 2006 arrest ===
In 2006, Irving pleaded guilty to the charge of denying the Holocaust in Austria, where Holocaust denial is a crime and where an arrest warrant was issued based on speeches he made in 1989. Irving knew that the warrant had been issued and that he was banned from Austria, but chose to go to Austria anyway. After he was arrested, Irving claimed in his plea that he had changed his opinions on the Holocaust: "I said that then based on my knowledge at the time, but by 1991 when I came across the Eichmann papers, I wasn't saying that anymore and I wouldn't say that now. The Nazis did murder millions of Jews." Upon hearing of Irving's sentence, Lipstadt said, "I am not happy when censorship wins, and I don't believe in winning battles via censorship... The way of fighting Holocaust deniers is with history and with truth."

== Reaction ==
=== Media response ===
The case was often referred to by the media as "history on trial." The response to the verdict was overwhelmingly positive.

Some saw the case as a vindication of the UK's strict libel laws. Others noted that Justice Gray "indicated that he did not 'regard it as being a part' of his function 'as the trial judge to make findings of fact as to what did and what did not occur during the Nazi regime in Germany', but he then spent hundreds of pages arguing about his position on such issues," claiming that it was the overly-strict libel laws that forced a judge to determine historical fact.

In 2005, C-SPAN planned to cover Dr. Lipstadt's book on the trial, History on Trial: My Day in Court with David Irving via its Book TV programme, but the cable network was heavily criticized when it was revealed that they had planned to put together a de facto debate between Dr. Lipstadt and Irving, by airing a new speech by Irving that they'd arranged with him to videotape, after an older one by Lipstadt (the network claimed this was going to be done for "balance"); when Lipstadt told C-SPAN she would not appear on the show under those circumstances, C-SPAN originally told her they would air Irving's speech by itself, but C-SPAN ended up cancelling this planned programme and instead aired a special that focused on how the trial was viewed by Washington Post reporter T. R. Reid and included clips of both Lipstadt and Irving.

=== Portrayal ===
==== 2000 television program ====
In December 2000, an episode of PBS's Nova, entitled "Holocaust on Trial", focused on the case. Produced concurrently with the actual trial, the programme's production staff frequently visited the courtroom. As video cameras were not allowed in the courtroom, the events in the trial were re-enacted for television. Irving was played by British actor John Castle. A team of historians were employed to gather the material necessary for the episode. The programme was almost completed when the verdict for the real trial was handed down. It also featured interviews with David Cesarani, Raul Hilberg, Richard Breitman, Richard Overy and Hugh Trevor-Roper.

==== 2016 film ====
The rights to adapt the story of the trial into a film were optioned by Participant Media. A script was written by David Hare. In April 2015, it was reported that Hilary Swank and Tom Wilkinson had signed on to portray Deborah Lipstadt and David Irving in a feature film about the 2000 trial. In November 2015, Rachel Weisz joined the cast of the film (replacing Swank) along with Timothy Spall, who would play Irving while Wilkinson would play Richard Rampton. Bleecker Street released the film, titled Denial, in the United States in September 2016.

== See also ==
- Defamation
  - English defamation law
  - Libel tourism, the idea that plaintiffs choose to file libel suits in jurisdictions thought more likely to give a favourable result.
  - 'Funding Evil' libel case, a case where an American writer was sued for libel in England, despite the fact that the book was not published there.
- The Holocaust
  - Nuremberg Trials, the series of war crime tribunals that followed World War II.
  - Eichmann trial, the trial of Adolf Eichmann, who had escaped and was not present at the Nuremberg Trials.
- Holocaust denial
  - Genocide denial
  - Laws against Holocaust denial
  - R. v. Zundel, a Canadian case in which a Holocaust denier was convicted under reporting false news. Upon appeal the law was overturned on free speech grounds.
  - R. v. Keegstra, another Canadian case, in which a conviction of an openly antisemitic teacher who denied the Holocaust in class, was upheld under hate crime law, regardless of free speech.
- Penguin Books
  - Penguin Group (USA) Inc. v. American Buddha
  - R v Penguin Books Ltd.

== Footnotes ==
=== References ===
- Irving v Penguin & Lipstadt, (2000): Judgment of Mr. Justice Gray, BAILLI
- "Irving v. Lipstadt : Transcripts". Holocaust Denial on Trial. Emory University. January 2016.
- Guttenplan, D.D. (2001). The Holocaust on trial. New York: Norton. ISBN 0-393-02044-4.
- Evans, Richard J. (2001). Lying about Hitler: history, Holocaust, and the David Irving trial. New York: Basic Books. ISBN 978-0-465-02152-9.
- Julius, Anthony (2012). Trials of the Diaspora: A History of Anti-Semitism in England. Oxford University Press. ISBN 978-0-19-960072-4.
- Lipstadt, Deborah E. (1994). Denying the Holocaust: the growing assault on truth and memory. New York: Plume. ISBN 0-452-27274-2.
- Lipstadt, Deborah E. (2005). History on trial: my day in court with David Irving. New York, N.Y: ECCO. ISBN 0-06-059376-8.
- Pelt, Robert Jan van (2002). The case for Auschwitz: evidence from the Irving trial. Bloomington: Indiana University Press. ISBN 978-0-253-34016-0.
