= Richard J. Evans =

British historian (born 1947)

Sir Richard J. Evans FRSL FRHistS FBA FLSW
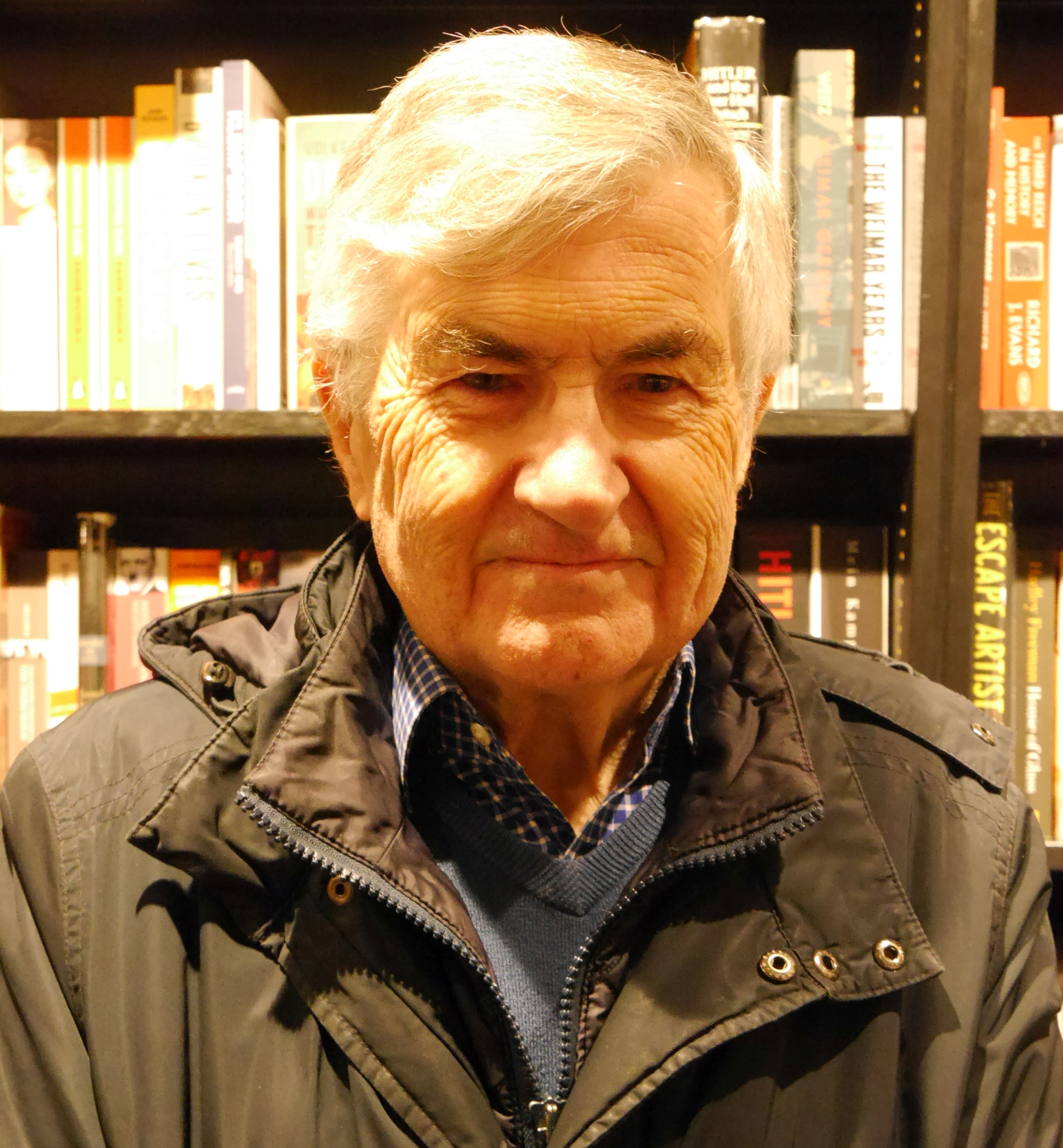
- Evans at Hatchards London in 2024
- Born: Richard John Evans; 29 September 1947 (age 79); Woodford, Essex, England

Academic background
- Education: Jesus College, Oxford (MA); St Antony's College, Oxford (DPhil); Hamburg University
- Thesis: The women's movement in Germany, 1890–1919 (1972)
- Doctoral advisor: Tony Nicholls

Academic work
- Institutions: University of Stirling; University of East Anglia; Birkbeck College; Columbia University; Umeå University; University of Cambridge; Gresham College
- Notable students: Nikolaus Wachsmann; Stefan Ihrig
- Main interests: History of Germany; Historical method Theory of history Historiography
- Notable works: The Third Reich Trilogy; The Pursuit of Power

Sir Richard John Evans FRSL FRHistS FBA FLSW (born 29 September 1947) is a British historian of 19th- and 20th-century Europe with a focus on Germany. He is the author of eighteen books, including his three-volume The Third Reich Trilogy (2003–2008). Evans was Regius Professor of History at the University of Cambridge from 2008 until he retired in 2014, and President of Cambridge's Wolfson College from 2010 to 2017. He has been Provost of Gresham College in London since 2014. Evans was appointed Knight Bachelor for services to scholarship in the 2012 Birthday Honours.

== Early life and education ==
Richard Evans was born at Woodford, Essex, on 29 September 1947, to Ieuan Trefor Evans and Evelyn (Jones) Evans, who both came from Wales. He was educated at Forest School, Jesus College, Oxford (MA), and St Antony's College, Oxford (DPhil). In a 2004 interview, he stated that frequent visits to Wales during his childhood inspired both an interest in history and a sense of "otherness". He said one reason that he was drawn to the study of modern German history in the late 1960s was his identification of parallels between the Vietnam War and German imperialism. He admired the work of Fritz Fischer, whom he credits with inspiring him to study modern German history.

== Historian of Germany ==
=== German feminism studies ===
Evans first established his academic reputation with his publications on the German Empire. In the early 1970s, Evans travelled to Germany to research his dissertation, a study of the feminist movement in Germany in the first half of the 20th century. It was later published as The Feminist Movement in Germany, 1894–1933 in 1976. Evans followed his study of German feminism by another book, The Feminists (1977), which traced the history of the feminist movement in North America, Australasia and Europe from 1840 to 1920.

A theme of both books was the weakness of German middle-class culture and its susceptibility to the appeal of nationalism. Evans argued that both liberalism and feminism failed in Germany for those reasons despite flourishing elsewhere in the Western world.

Evans' main interest is social history, and he is much influenced by the Annales school. He largely agrees with Fischer that 19th-century German social development paved the way for the rise of the Third Reich, but Evans takes pains to point out that many other possibilities could have happened. (Note: "Searching for an explanation of the origins and rise of Nazism in German history inevitably runs the risk of making the whole process seem inevitable. At almost every turn, however, things might have been different. The triumph of Nazism was far from a foregone conclusion right up to the early months of 1933. Yet it was no historical accident, either.") For Evans, the values of the 19th-century German middle class contained the already germinating seeds of National Socialism.

=== History from below ===
Evans studied under Fischer in Hamburg in 1970 and 1971 but came to disagree with the "Bielefeld School" of historians, who argued for the Sonderweg thesis that saw the roots of Germany's political development in the first half of the 20th century in a "failed bourgeois revolution" in 1848. Following a contemporary trend that opposed the previous "great man" theory of history, Evans was a member of a group of young British historians who in the 1970s sought to examine German history during the German Empire "from below". These scholars highlighted "the importance of the grass-roots of politics and the everyday life and experience of ordinary people". "History is about people, and their relationships. It's about the perennial question of 'how much free will do people have in building their own lives, and making a future", Evans has said. He says he supported the creation of a "new school of people's history", which was a result of a trend that "has taken place across a whole range of historical subjects, political opinions, and methodological approaches and has been expressed in many different ways".

In 1978, as editor of a collection of essays by young British historians entitled Society And Politics in Wilhelmine Germany, he launched a critique of the 'top-down' approach of the Bielefeld School associated with Hans-Ulrich Wehler and Jürgen Kocka regarding Wilhelmine Germany. With the historians Geoff Eley and David Blackbourn, Evans instead emphasized the "self-mobilization from below" of key sociopolitical groups, as well as the modernity of National Socialism. In the 1980s, Evans organized ten international workshops on modern German social history at the University of East Anglia that did a good deal to refine these ideas, to pioneer research in this new historical field and, in six collections of papers, present it to an Anglophone readership.

=== History of crime and punishment ===
Among Evans' major research works are Death in Hamburg (1987), a study of class conflict and liberal government in 19th-century Germany using the example of Hamburg's cholera epidemics and applying statistical methods to the exploration of social inequality in an industrializing society, and Rituals of Retribution (1996), a study of capital punishment in German history applying structural anthropological concepts to the rituals of public execution up to the mid-19th century and exploring the politics of the death penalty until its abolition by East Germany in 1987.

In Death in Hamburg, Evans studied the cholera outbreak in Hamburg in 1892, which he concluded was caused by a failure in the medical system to safeguard against such an event. Another study in German social history was Tales from the German Underworld (1998), where Evans traced the life stories of four German criminals in the late 19th century, namely a homeless woman, a forger, a prostitute and a conman.

In Rituals of Retribution, Evans traced the history of capital punishment in Germany, and using the ideas of Michel Foucault, Philippe Ariès and Norbert Elias as his guide argued that opposition to the death penalty was strongest when liberalism was in the ascendancy, and support for capital punishment coincided when the right was in the ascendancy. Thus, in Evans' view, capital punishment in Germany was never a mere matter of law being disinterestedly applied but was rather a form of state power being exercised.

In addition, Evans examined such subjects as belief in witchcraft, torture, the last words of the executed, the psychology of mobs, varying forms of execution from the Thirty Years War to the 1980s, profiles of executioners, cruelty, and changing views towards the death penalty.

=== Nazi historiography debates ===
In the 1980s, Evans was a conspicuous figure in the Historikerstreit, a controversy surrounding the historical work and theories of German historians Ernst Nolte, Joachim Fest, Andreas Hillgruber, Michael Stürmer, Hagen Schulze, Imanuel Geiss and Klaus Hildebrand, all of whom Evans considered German apologists attempting to white-wash the German past. Evans' views on the Historikerstreit were set forth in his 1989 book, In Hitler's Shadow. In that book, Evans took issue with Nolte's acceptance of the Commissar Order as a legitimate military order; with Nolte's argument that the Einsatzgruppen massacres of Ukrainian Jews were a justifiable "preventive security" response to Soviet partisan attacks; his description (citing Viktor Suvorov) of Operation Barbarossa as a "preventative war" forced on Hitler by an impending Soviet attack; and his complaints that much scholarship on the Shoah expressed the views of "biased" Jewish historians.

Evans characterized Nolte's statements as crossing the line into Holocaust denial and he singled out Nolte's rationalization that since the victors write history, the only reason why the Third Reich is seen as evil is because it lost the war.

Evans also denounced, as an attempt to justify the Holocaust, Nolte's claim that Chaim Weizmann's letter of 3 September 1939 to Neville Chamberlain, promising that the Jewish Agency would support the war effort constituted "Jewish declaration of war" on Germany that justified the pre-emptive internment of Jews in concentration camps.

In his 1989 book, In Hitler's Shadow, Evans also criticised the intentionalist theories of Hillgruber and Hildebrand. and criticized Stürmer's excessive focus on political history and overlooking of social conditions, as a regression to the outmoded great man theory of history. For his part Evans praised Sir Ian Kershaw, who wrote that "The road to Auschwitz was built by hate, but paved with indifference". (It was Evans who first suggested to Kershaw that he undertake to write a biography of Adolf Hitler.)

=== Defending historical knowledge ===
Evans' In Defence of History defends the discipline of history against postmodernist skepticism of its value. The limitations of our ability to understand and learn from the past notwithstanding, it is still possible, he argues, to reconstruct past events. Evans suggests that the spread in the 1980s and 1990s of post-modernist theories, which declare that history is solely the construct of the historian and depict the rationalist tradition of the West as a form of oppression, was not necessarily left-wing or progressive, for by denying the possibility of accessing past facts, it had also done much to increase the appeal of Holocaust denial.

== Role as an expert witness in Irving v Penguin Books and Lipstadt ==
Evans is probably best known to the general public in the role of an expert witness for the defence in the high-profile libel case of David Irving against the American historian Deborah Lipstadt in 2000, Irving v Penguin Books and Lipstadt. Lipstadt was sued for libel by Irving, after she referred to him as a "Holocaust denier" and "an ardent follower of Adolf Hitler" in her 1993 book, Denying the Holocaust. Lipstadt further accused Irving of "distorting evidence and manipulating documents to serve his own purposes...[as well as] skewing documents and misrepresenting data in order to reach historically untenable conclusions, particularly those that exonerate Hitler."

Evans acted as an expert witness for the defence in the case. Starting in the autumn of 1997, Evans, along with Thomas Skelton-Robinson and Nik Wachsmann, two of his PhD students, closely examined Irving's work. They found instances in which he had used forged documents, disregarded contrary evidence, selectively quoted historical documents out of context, and mis-cited historical records, thus misrepresenting historical evidence in order to support his prejudices. Evans subsequently proved to be a powerful witness in Lipstadt's ultimately successful defence. In his expert witness report he wrote:

Not one of [Irving's] books, speeches or articles, not one paragraph, not one sentence in any of them, can be taken on trust as an accurate representation of its historical subject. All of them are completely worthless as history, because Irving cannot be trusted anywhere, in any of them, to give a reliable account of what he is talking or writing about. ... if we mean by historian someone who is concerned to discover the truth about the past, and to give as accurate a representation of it as possible, then Irving is not a historian.

The cross-examination of Evans by Irving was noted for the high degree of personal dislike between the two men. Such was the degree of dislike that Irving challenged Evans on very minor points, such as Evans doubting the fairness of a 1936 German election in which the Nazi Party (the only legal political party in Germany at the time) received 98.8% of the vote (in a rigged election). A subject that drew Irving and Evans deep into debate was a memo by the Chief of the Reich Chancellery Hans Lammers to the Reich Justice Minister Franz Schlegelberger in which Lammers wrote that Hitler ordered him to put the "Jewish Question" on the "back-burner" until after the war. Evans chose to accept the interpretation of the memo put forward by Eberhard Jäckel in the 1970s; Irving chose to interpret the memo literally and taunted Evans by saying, "It is a terrible problem, is it not that we are faced with this tantalizing plate of crumbs and morsels of what should have provided the final smoking gun, and nowhere the whole way through the archives do we find even one item that we do not have to interpret or read between the lines of, but we do have in the same chain of evidence documents which ... quite clearly specifically show Hitler intervening in the other sense?"

In response, Evans stated, "No, I do not accept that at all. It is because you want to interpret euphemisms as being literal, and that is what the whole problem is. Every time there is a euphemism, Mr. Irving ... or a camouflage piece of statement or language about Madagascar, you want to treat it as the literal truth, because it serves your purpose of trying to exculpate Hitler. That is part of ... the way you manipulate and distort the documents."

In a 2001 interview, Evans described to the Canadian columnist Robert Fulford his impression of Irving after being cross-examined by him as: "He [Irving] was a bit like a dim student who didn't listen. If he didn't get the answer he wanted, he just repeated the question."

The High Court rejected Irving's libel suit and awarded costs to the defence.

Evans' findings and his account of the trial were published in his 2001 book Lying About Hitler: History, Holocaust, and the David Irving Trial, which was published as Telling Lies About Hitler in the United States in 2002. His involvement in the trial was included in the 2016 film Denial, in which he was played by British actor John Sessions.

== The Third Reich Trilogy ==
Between 2003 and 2008, Evans published a three-volume history of the Third Reich. Drawing on years of experience as a leading scholar of German history, Evans produced what some historians call the most extensive and comprehensive history of the rise and fall of Hitler's regime ever produced by a single scholar. Reviewer Peter Mansoor says, "The Third Reich at War is a superb piece of scholarship that is likely to emerge as the definitive account of life and death inside Hitler's blood soaked Third Reich." Robert Citino says, "Read together, the three volumes constitute a remarkably comprehensive treatment of the origins, course, and death of the Hitler regime, and are likely to be standard works for a long time to come." Ed Ericson says:

Evans masterfully interweaves testimony that has come to light in the intervening decades with learned judgments from hundreds of authors to create a balanced and thoughtful narrative. This book, therefore, will assuredly become the definitive work on The Third Reich at War.

The first volume, The Coming of the Third Reich: How the Nazis Destroyed Democracy and Seized Power in Germany (published by Penguin in 2003), shows how a country torn apart by the First World War, the terms of the Treaty of Versailles, hyperinflation and the Great Depression moved towards an increasingly authoritarian solution. The book explains in detail Adolf Hitler's appointment as Chancellor in January 1933 and how the Nazis transformed Germany into a one party dictatorship. The first volume featured highly favourable words of praise from Evans's friend Ian Kershaw on its cover.

The second volume, The Third Reich in Power, 1933–1939: How the Nazis Won Over the Hearts and Minds of a Nation (published by Penguin in 2005), covers the years of Nazi rule between 1933 and 1939. The final chapter examines the road to the Second World War, but the real focus is on life inside the Third Reich. Evans allows small stories of key individuals to illustrate many of the key social, economic and cultural events of the period. Richard Overy described this installment of the trilogy as "magisterial".

The third volume, The Third Reich at War: How the Nazis Led Germany from Conquest to Disaster (published by Penguin in 2008), looks at major developments from 1939 to 1945, including the key battles of the Second World War, a vivid, moving and detailed account of the mass murder enacted during the Holocaust and Hitler's dramatic downfall in Berlin in 1945. In an October 2008 review of the third volume for The Times, best-selling historian Antony Beevor writes: "With this third volume, Richard Evans has accomplished a masterpiece of historical scholarship ... [He] has produced the best and most up-to-date synthesis of the huge work carried out on the subject over the past decades." However, Timothy Snyder, while praising Evans's "vertical method [of] weav[ing] together the experiences of people and the workings of the institutions of power" in Germany, criticized the third volume's discussion of occupied Poland and the USSR as oversimplified and sometimes inaccurate.

Walter Reich, former Director of the United States Holocaust Memorial Museum in Washington, D.C., stated about the third-volume of the trilogy, The Third Reich at War, "If any work of accurate history has a chance to correct the distortions of public memory, this is it."

The Third Reich trilogy has been, or is being translated, into sixteen foreign languages.

== Recent publications and current work ==
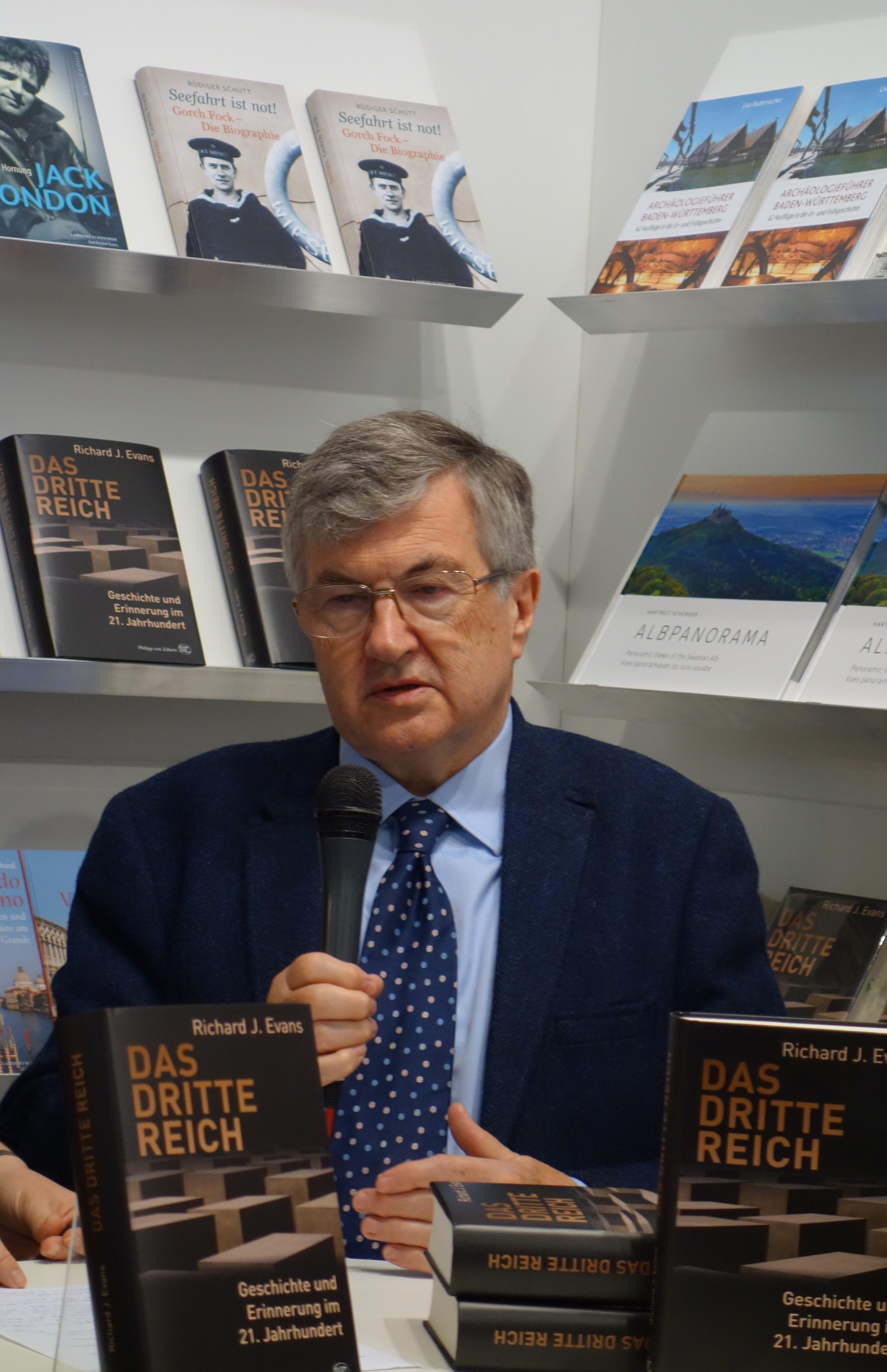
Evans at the Frankfurt Book Fair presenting his book about the Third Reich in 2016

In 2013, Evans delivered the Menachem Stern Jerusalem Lectures to the Historical Society of Israel, publishing them in 2014 as Altered Pasts: Counterfactuals in History. The book puts forward a variety of arguments against the use of long-range alternative historical timelines as an aid to serious historical understanding. In "Cosmopolitan Islanders: British Historians and the European Continent" (2009, an expanded version of his Inaugural Lecture as Regius Professor), he explored the reasons why so many British historians have made such major contributions to the historical understanding of other European countries. The Third Reich in History and Memory (2015) is a collection of 28 articles and review essays on modern German history published since the turn of the century.

In 2016, Evans published The Pursuit of Power: Europe 1815–1914, volume 7 in the Penguin History of Europe. It has been widely reviewed: Gerard De Groot, writing in The Times, commented that the book "chronicles a turbulent and confusing century with wonderful clarity and verve...in one great canvas of immense detail and beauty ... transnational history at its finest." Dominic Sandbrook, in The Sunday Times, described it as "dazzlingly erudite and entertaining". It has been, or is being translated into Dutch, Spanish, German, Greek, Chinese, Korean, Japanese, Portuguese and Italian.

He has written a biography on the historian Eric Hobsbawm entitled Eric Hobsbawm: A Life in History.

From 2013 to 2018 Evans was principal investigator in a £1.6 million Leverhulme Programme Grant on conspiracy, and is preparing work based on the findings of the project.

== Regius Professor of Modern History ==
In 2008, Evans was appointed Regius Professor of Modern History at the University of Cambridge (in 2010 the word "Modern" was removed from the title by royal decree). The post is a royal appointment in the gift of the Prime Minister of the day and dates back to 1724. Previous holders of the title have included John Dalberg-Acton (1895), Herbert Butterfield (1963), Geoffrey Elton (1983), Patrick Collinson (1988) and Quentin Skinner (1998). Evans is the first historian to have to apply for the post and be interviewed by a Board of Electors, including Cambridge's Vice-Chancellor, Alison Richard, and representatives of the history faculty and the university, as well as external assessors from Yale, Harvard, Oxford and London. The board selected a shortlist of four, each of whom was asked to give a presentation to the entire Cambridge history faculty. The shortlist of four was then reduced to two, whom the board interviewed, resulting in the board's recommendation of Evans to the Prime Minister and in the issue of a Royal Warrant for his appointment. As well as serving as Regius Professor, Evans served as chairman of the history faculty from October 2008 to 30 September 2010.

Evans is used to combining administration with research. At Birkbeck College, London, where he worked before Cambridge, he acted as Master of the college when Baroness Blackstone left suddenly to become Tony Blair's first higher education minister. On 27 January 2010 he was elected to the position of President of Wolfson College, Cambridge, serving the statutory seven-year term of office until retiring from the post on 30 September 2017. During this period he focused on building up the college as a centre of contemporary culture, with art exhibitions by Richard Deacon and Anthony Green, and talks by Martin Amis and Neil MacGregor, among many others. In 2014 he was appointed Provost of Gresham College, in the City of London, an institution founded in 1597 to provide free lectures to Londoners. There are now over 2,000 lectures on the college's website and the 130 lectures a year are all live-streamed.

== Media appearances ==
Evans has appeared regularly on a number of TV documentaries related to Adolf Hitler and the Third Reich. He recently appeared on a major TV documentary on the History Channel which examined the Valkyrie bomb plot against Hitler in July 1944.

In 2022, Evans, along with historians Frank McDonough, John Bew, Tim Bouverie, Jonathan Haslam, and Andrew Roberts, contributed to the two part 2022 Odyssey Television documentary for the BBC Could Hitler Have Been Stopped? The Politics of Appeasement.

He writes reviews of history books for the London Review of Books, the Times Literary Supplement and The Guardian, as well as historical reflections on recent events for American magazines and websites, including Foreign Policy, The Nation, and Vox.

== Other contributions ==
Evans has been co-editor of the Journal of Contemporary History since 2000, and has also served as Deputy Chair of the Spoliation Advisory Panel, a UK government non-departmental public body formed to make recommendations to the Secretary of State for Digital, Culture, Media and Sport on the restitution of cultural objects looted during the Nazi era. He has been a judge of the Wolfson History Prize, the UK's richest history book award, for over twenty years.

== Lectures and commentaries ==
In 2011, Evans became involved in a polemical exchange of letters with Peter Baldwin after agreeing with Leif Jerram, who wrote in Cosmopolitan Islanders in 2009 that students in Britain could find a richer selection of courses on the histories of other countries in British universities than students from other countries could in their own countries.

=== Hobsbawm lecture ===
On 7 February 2019, Evans gave a lecture at Chancellor's Hall in the University of London's Senate House to launch his new biography of Marxist historian Eric Hobsbawm, A Life in History. At the time, a boycott of the University of London including the Senate House, organised by the Independent Workers' Union of Great Britain and supported by a number of high-profile politicians, journalists and academics, including John McDonnell, Owen Jones, Ken Loach and David Graeber in order to pressure University of London to bring their outsourced maintenance staff back in house, was in place. Claiming it was hypocritical breaking a boycott in support of workers' rights to give a talk about a lifelong committed communist, the union and other supporters encouraged Evans to relocate his talk. Evans said he supported the cause and would "bring it to the attention of the meeting." Birkbeck College said they supported the university in bringing the staff in house, a process that, they said, was already underway.

== Honours and distinctions ==
- 1978: Fellow of the Royal Historical Society
- 1988: Wolfson History Prize
- 1989: William H. Welch Medal of the American Association for the History of Medicine
- 1993: Civic Medal for Arts and Sciences of the Free and Hanseatic City of Hamburg
- 1993: Fellow of the British Academy (FBA)
- 1994: Fraenkel Prize in Contemporary History
- 1998: Honorary Fellow, Jesus College, Oxford
- 1999: Honorary Fellow, Birkbeck, University of London
- 1999: Fellow of the Royal Society of Literature (FRSL)
- 2010: Founding Fellow, Learned Society of Wales (FLSW)
- 2011: Honorary Fellow, Gonville and Caius College, Cambridge
- 2012: Knighted for services to Scholarship in the 2012 Birthday Honours
- 2012: Honorary Doctor of Letters, University of London
- 2015: Honorary Doctor of Letters, University of Oxford
- 2015: British Academy Leverhulme Prize and Medal
- 2017: Honorary Fellow, Wolfson College, Cambridge

== Works ==
- The Feminist Movement in Germany, 1894–1933, London: SAGE, 1976.
- "German Women and the Triumph of Hitler", The Journal of Modern History Vol. 48, No. 1, 1976.
- The Feminists: Women's Emancipation Movements in Europe, America and Australasia, 1840–1920, London: Croom Helm, 1977.
- (ed.) Society and Politics in Wilhelmine Germany, London: Croom Helm, 1978.
- The German Family: Essays on the Social History of the Family in Nineteenth and Twentieth-Century Germany, London: C. Helm; Totowa, NJ: Barnes & Noble Books, 1981.
- (ed.) The German Working Class, 1888–1933: The Politics of Everyday Life, London: Croom Helm; Totowa, NJ: Barnes & Noble, 1982.
- (ed., with W. R. Lee) The German Peasantry: Conflict and Community in Rural Society from the Eighteenth to the Twentieth Centuries, London: Croom Helm, 1986.
- (ed., with Dick Geary) The German Unemployed: Experiences and Consequences of Mass Unemployment from the Weimar Republic to the Third Reich, London: C. Helm, 1987.
- Rethinking German History: Nineteenth-Century Germany and the Origins of the Third Reich, London: Allen and Unwin, 1987.
- Comrades and Sisters: Feminism, Socialism, and Pacifism in Europe, 1870–1945, Brighton, Sussex: Wheatsheaf Books; New York: St. Martin's Press, 1987.
- Death in Hamburg: Society and Politics in the Cholera Years, 1830–1910, Oxford: Clarendon Press, 1987.
- The German Underworld: Deviants and Outcasts in German History, London: Routledge, 1988.
- In Hitler's Shadow: West German Historians and the Attempt to Escape from the Nazi Past. London: I.B. Tauris. 1989. ISBN 1-85043-146-9.
- Proletarians and Politics: Socialism, Protest, and the Working Class in Germany Before the First World War, New York: Harvester Wheatsheaf, 1990.
- The German Bourgeoisie: Essays on the Social History of the German Middle Class from the Late Eighteenth to the Early Twentieth Century London: Routledge, 1991.
- Rituals of Retribution: Capital Punishment in Germany 1600–1987, London: Oxford University Press, 1996.
- Rereading German History: From Unification to Reunification, 1800–1996, London: Routledge, 1997.
- Tales from the German Underworld: Crime and Punishment in the Nineteenth Century, New Haven, CT: Yale University Press, 1998.
- In Defence of History, London: Granta Books, 1997; rev. edn. New York: W. W. Norton, 1999; edn. with extensive new afterword, London: Granta, 2000.
- Lying About Hitler: History, Holocaust, and the David Irving Trial, New York: Basic Books, 2001; published in the United Kingdom as Telling Lies About Hitler: The Holocaust, History and the David Irving Trial, London: Verso, 2002.
- The Coming of the Third Reich, London: Allen Lane, 2003.
- The Third Reich in Power, 1933–1939, London: Allen Lane, 2005.
- The Third Reich at War: How the Nazis Led Germany from Conquest to Disaster, London: Allen Lane, 2008.
- Cosmopolitan Islanders: British Historians and the European Continent, Cambridge: Cambridge University Press, 2009.
- Altered Pasts: Counterfactuals in History, Waltham, MA: Brandeis University Press, 2013.
- The Third Reich in History and Memory, Oxford: Oxford University Press, 2015.
- The Pursuit of Power: Europe 1815–1914, London: Allen Lane, 2016.
- Eric Hobsbawm: A Life in History, London: Little, Brown, 2019.
- The Hitler Conspiracies: The Third Reich and the Paranoid Imagination, New York: Oxford University Press (ISBN 9780190083052); London: Allen Lane, 2020 (ISBN 978-0-241-41346-3)
- Hitler's People: The Faces of the Third Reich, London: Allen Lane, 2024.

== See also ==
- Bibliography of Adolf Hitler

== Sources ==
- Evans, Richard J. (2005). The coming of the Third Reich. New York: Penguin Books. ISBN 978-0-14-303469-8.
- Guttenplan, D. D. (2001). The Holocaust on Trial. New York: W. W. Norton & Company. ISBN 978-0-393-02044-1.
- Snowman, Daniel (2004). "Richard J. Evans". History Today. 54 (1): 45–47.

Academic offices
Preceded by Gordon Johnson	President of Wolfson College, Cambridge; 2010–2017	Succeeded by Jane Clarke (scientist)
Preceded by Quentin Skinner	Cambridge Regius Professor of (Modern) History; 2008–2014	Succeeded by Christopher Clark
