= Mishcon =

Mishcon may refer to:

- Victor Mishcon, Baron Mishcon, (1915–2006), British solicitor
- Mishcon de Reya, a British law firm founded by Victor Mishcon
