= Anthony Julius =

British solicitor advocate and academic (born 1956)

Anthony Robert Julius (born 16 July 1956) is a British solicitor advocate known for being Diana, Princess of Wales' divorce lawyer and for representing Deborah Lipstadt. He is the deputy chairman at the law firm Mishcon de Reya and honorary solicitor to the Foundation for Jewish Heritage.

He holds the chair in Law and Arts in the Faculty of Laws at University College London and teaches courses on Shakespeare, Kant, and William Empson. He is also a visiting professor at the University of Haifa.

== Life ==
The son of a London menswear retailer who died young from a brain tumour, Julius was educated at the City of London School. He studied English literature at Jesus College, Cambridge, graduating in 1977 with a first class degree; in the mid-1990s he completed a PhD in English literature at University College London under the novelist and academic Dan Jacobson. He joined the Bloomsbury law firm Mishcon de Reya in 1979, becoming a partner in 1984. Currently, he is deputy chairman of the firm.

== Activities ==
Julius is a commercial litigator. He is a specialist in the fields of defamation, international trade disputes, and media law. He has been a solicitor advocate since at least 2001, which allows him to act as a barrister in so far as he can now appear in the High Court and the Court of Appeal.

He was selected by Diana, Princess of Wales, as her legal representative when she divorced Charles, Prince of Wales, in 1996. He was vice-president of the Diana, Princess of Wales Memorial Fund, until it closed in 2012. He was one of the charity's founding trustees and its first chairman until 1999.

He represented Deborah Lipstadt, successfully defending her in Irving v Penguin Books and Lipstadt, with Richard Rampton QC, against a libel suit brought against her by the Holocaust denier David Irving. Lipstadt and her publishers were vindicated by the judge's ruling in April 2000. A feature film about the case, Denial, with Andrew Scott playing Julius, was released in 2016.

Julius is legal advisor to the Foundation of Jewish Heritage.

Julius is an advisory editor at the current affairs journal Fathom. He was a founding member of Engage and the Euston Manifesto. From 2011 to 2014 he was chairman of the board of The Jewish Chronicle.

From 1996 to 1998 he was a part-time lecturer at the Law Faculty of University College London. In 2017 he rejoined University College London as the inaugural chair in Law and the Arts. He was previously chairman of the London Consortium and visiting professor at Birkbeck, University of London.

He serves as trustee to English PEN, the founding centre of a worldwide writers' association. Julius is also chairman of the trustees of Phenomen Trust.

Between 2007 and 2013, Julius played an active role in the campaign against the academic boycott of Israeli universities. In a Guardian article co-authored with historian Simon Schama, Julius wrote "This is not the first boycott call directed at Jews. On 1 April 1933, a week after he came to power, Hitler ordered a boycott of Jewish shops, banks, offices and department stores."

Julius's other activities in this context included representing Ronnie Fraser in an action against the University and College Union (UCU). Fraser, who was a member of the union, complained that it had created an "intimidating", "hostile", "humiliating", and "offensive" environment for Jews. After a 20-day hearing the tribunal rejected his claim, harshly rebuking Julius for "misusing the legal process". Scorn is also invoked for Julius's decision to pursue certain points, with complaints variously dismissed as "palpably groundless", "obviously hopeless" and "devoid of any merit". The Committee for Accuracy in Middle East Reporting in America (CAMERA), criticized the rejection.

== Private life ==
Julius as belongs to an Orthodox synagogue, observing kashrut, and refraining from work, telephone use and driving on Shabbat.

He married Judith Bernie in 1979; the couple had four children, but later divorced. In 1999, he married Dina Rabinovitch and had one child with her. Rabinovitch died in 2007 from breast cancer. In 2009, he married Katarina Lester, and is step-father to her two children. They had a son together in 2011.

== Selected publications ==
- T. S. Eliot, Anti-Semitism and Literary Form (1st edition Cambridge University Press 1995, 2nd edition Thames & Hudson 2003), based on his PhD thesis
- Idolising Pictures (Thames & Hudson, 2000).
- Transgressions: The Offences of Art (Thames & Hudson, 2002).
- "Dickens the lawbreaker" in Critical Quarterly (John Wiley & Sons, 2003)
- "Love Poetry and the Art of Advocacy" in Critical Quarterly (John Wiley & Sons, 2003)
- "Art Crimes", in Law and Literature (Oxford University Press 1999) and in Dear Images: Art, Copyright and Culture (Ridinghouse, 2003).
- Trials of the Diaspora: A History of Anti-Semitism in England (Oxford University Press, 2010; paperback edition, with fresh material, 2012). ISBN 978-0-19-929705-4.
- Bentham and the Arts – co-editor, and contributor ("More Bentham, Less Mill")
- Whither liberal Zionism?
- The Rebirth of Antisemitism in the 21st Century: From the Academic Boycott Campaign into the Mainstream Contributor - (Studies in Contemporary Antisemitism)
- "Psychoanalysis and Free Speech," Ernest Jones Memorial Lecture, 2023. British Psychoanalytic Society.
- Abraham: The First Jew – a volume in the Yale Jewish Lives Series (2025)

=== Articles ===
- Julius, Anthony (2018). "Dedications". Current Legal Problems. 71: 1–16. doi:10.1093/clp/cuy007.
- Julius, Anthony (2022). "Willed Ignorance: Reflections on academic free speech, occasioned by the David Miller case". Current Legal Problems. 75: 1–44. doi:10.1093/clp/cuac001.
- Julius, Anthony (5 November 2023). "This is Britain's antisemitic moment — and our institutions are failing to respond". The Sunday Times.

== Sources ==
- Grove, Jack (27 March 2013). "Tribunal slams academic for bringing anti-Semitism case". Times Higher Education.
- "Mr R Fraser -v- University & College Union". Courts and Tribunals Judiciary. February 2013.
- Levick, Adam (3 April 2013). "Antisemitism at the UCU: David Hirsh responds to Tribunal ruling against Fraser". CAMERA UK.
