= Antisemitism: Here and Now =

2019 non-fiction book by Deborah Lipstadt

- First edition
- Author: Deborah Lipstadt
- Publisher: Schocken Books
- Publication date: January 2019
- ISBN: 978-0-8052-4337-6

Antisemitism: Here and Now is a book by Deborah Lipstadt published in February 2019.

The book is written in the form of a series of letters between a "whip smart" college student, "Abigail," and a well-intentioned, non-Jewish law school professor, "Joe," who are composite characters of people in Lipstadt's academic and social circles. The questions raised in the letters are based on actual questions that Deborah E. Lipstadt has been asked about antisemitism.

Lipstadt defines antisemitism as “not the hatred of people who happen to be Jews. It is hatred of them because they are Jews” and stipulates that it arises “independently of any action by Jews.”
