= Charles Gray (judge) =

British judge (1942–2022)

Sir Charles Antony St John Gray, QC (6 July 1942 – 3 March 2022) was a British barrister and judge, who specialised in intellectual property, copyright, privacy and defamation cases. As a judge, he presided over the trial of David Irving's libel lawsuit against Professor Deborah Lipstadt and Penguin Books over claims that Irving was a Holocaust denier; Gray delivered a 349-page-long judgment against Irving.

== Life and career ==
Gray was born at Middlesex Hospital in Fitzrovia, London, England on 6 July 1942. He attended Trinity College, Oxford, earning a bachelor's degree in 1961. He was called to the bar by Lincoln's Inn and began his practice in 1967. Cases he tried include Crossman Diaries, Saatchi v Saatchi & Saatchi, Elton John v MGN, Aldington v Tolstoy, Aitken v Granada and Guardian. He took silk in 1984 as a Queen's Counsel and was elected a bencher in 1993.

He retired in 2008 although occasionally presided over the Queen's Bench until 2011. He served as an adjudicator in lawsuits against News Group Newspapers brought by people whose phones were hacked by the group. He was a Commissioner in the High Court of Jersey.

Gray was knighted by the Queen in December 1998. He died at a care home in Hindhead, Surrey on 3 March 2022, aged 79. Gray suffered from dementia in the later years of his life.

He was portrayed by actor Alex Jennings in Denial, the 2016 film based on the Irving v Penguin Books Ltd and Lipstadt case.
