= Mishcon de Reya =

British law firm

Mishcon de Reya LLP
- Headquarters: Africa House, 70 Kingsway, London WC2B 6AH, United Kingdom
- No. of offices: 5
- No. of lawyers: Over 650
- No. of employees: Over 1,450
- Major practice areas: Corporate, Dispute Resolution, Employment, Intellectual Property, Mishcon Private, Real Estate
- Key people: Kevin Gold; Executive Chairperson; James Libson; Senior Partner; Daniel Naftalin; Managing Partner
- Revenue: £330 million (FY2023/2024)
- Date founded: 1937 (London)
- Company type: Limited liability partnership
- Website: mishcon.com

Mishcon de Reya LLP is a British international law firm with offices in London, Cambridge, Oxford, Singapore, Dubai as well as an association with Karas So LLP in Hong Kong. Founded in 1988 through a merger of Victor Mishcon's practice and Bartletts de Reya, it employs more than 1,450 people with over 650 lawyers. It was regarded by some as forming part of the "Silver Circle" of leading UK law firms.

Mishcon de Reya's revenue for 2024–2025 was £330 million with a profit of £110 million.

In January 2022, the company paid a record $315,000 fine in the UK for violating anti-money-laundering rules.

== History ==
Victor Mishcon started his legal practice at 463–465 Brixton Road in 1937. He moved to Holborn after World War II.

Mishcon de Reya was formed in 1988 by the merger of the one-man office Victor Mishcon & Co and Bartletts de Reya. Anthony Julius replaced Victor Mishcon as senior partner in April 1992.

The firm became a limited liability partnership on 9 October 2015. In May 2020 the firm opened a new branch office in Singapore. In 2021, the firm announced MDR Solutions I, a venture with Harbour to fund litigation and arbitration cases. In 2023 Mishcon de Reya LLP merged with Taylor Vinters.

In 2008, the firm launched the specialist 'Pink Law' Legal Advice Centre in conjunction with Queen Mary, University of London, offering free legal advice on issues affecting the LGBT community. In 2016, this expanded to include SPITE, for victims of 'revenge porn', and again in 2020 with the establishment of the Black Justice Project clinic, concerned with employment discrimination against the Black community, the Windrush Compensation Scheme and lawsuits against the police.

=== Corruption and moneylaundering ===
In connection with the murdered Maltese journalist Daphne Caruana Galizia, The Guardian newspaper reported:

"In the months before her death, the anti-corruption journalist received letters from the London office of the blue-chip firm Mishcon de Reya, which specialises in bringing defamation cases. Mishcon had been hired to defend the reputation of a client doing business in Malta. 'The firm sought to cripple her financially with libel action in UK courts,' Caruana Galizia's three sons claim in a letter to the writers' campaign group English PEN and seen by the Guardian. 'Had our mother not been murdered, they would have succeeded.'"

According to the British satirical magazine Private Eye:

"Daphne also wrote about receiving 'harassing letters from Mishcon de Reya in London' that threatened 'to ruin me financially in a London court.' Letters from Mishcon, seen by the Eye, order her to remove articles discussing the lucrative sale of Maltese passports and the EU citizenship that goes with them."

In 2020 the Solicitors Regulation Authority (SRA) announced that their forensic and anti-money laundering investigators were conducting a multi-year investigation into the company's activities.

In January 2022, the firm agreed to pay a record fine of £232,500 plus costs, following an investigation by the Solicitors Regulation Authority (SRA), for committing what the SRA called "serious breaches" of money laundering rules.

A Mishcon spokesperson said:

"We are pleased to have come to a settlement with the SRA relating to two separate and historic investigations in relation to which we have made appropriate admissions. Mitigating factors such as our cooperation with the SRA throughout the investigations and the corrective action we have taken since to prevent a recurrence have been recognised by the SRA in reaching this outcome"

=== Awards and accolades ===
Mishcon de Reya was named Law Firm of the Year at The Legal Business Awards 2017, UK Trademark Litigation Firm of the Year in the Global IP Awards 2022, UK Trademark Contentious Law Firm of the Year at the Managing Intellectual Property EMEA Awards 2022, the 2022 'Insurance Law Award' at the annual National Insurance Awards.

== Notable clients ==
Victor Mishcon handled the divorce of Ruth Ellis and later attempted to secure a reprieve for her after she was convicted to death for murder in 1955.

In 1995 one of the firm's solicitors, Anthony Julius, represented Diana, Princess of Wales, in her divorce. In 2000 the firm represented historian Deborah Lipstadt in the case David Irving v Penguin Books and Deborah Lipstadt. The 2016 film Denial was based on the case.

In 2006, Mishcon de Reya represented Karie Murphy in a legal dispute with her trade union Unison, which brought financial mismanagement charges against her. It also handled her communications with the press during the 2013 Labour Party Falkirk candidate selection affair, allegedly as part of legal aid offered to Murphy by Unite the Union.

The company ran a VIP Russia service that provides "reputation protection," wealth structuring and asset protection for Russian clients. The Pandora Papers revealed that the company had helped Russian politician Alexei Chepa use an offshore company to buy a London mansion in 2011.

Mishcon de Reya's employment team won a case in the UK Supreme Court on behalf of its client Krista Bates van Winkelhof, in which it was determined that members of limited liability partnerships (LLPs) do have the protection of whistleblowing legislation.

In 2016, the Supreme Court ruled financial claims can be brought over 20 years after divorce for client Kathleen Wyatt.

In 2016, the company co-ordinated a challenge in the High Court by Gina Miller, an investment manager and philanthropist, against the process of the United Kingdom's withdrawal from the European Union. The British government appealed the High Court ruling to the Supreme Court in January 2017, but were unsuccessful. In a majority decision, it ruled that Parliament must vote on whether the Government could start the process of the United Kingdom's withdrawal from the European Union. The firm again represented Gina Miller in 2019 in R (on behalf of Miller) v The Prime Minister. The Supreme Court unanimously ruled that Prime Minister Boris Johnson's decision to prorogue Parliament was unlawful.

In July 2018, the Labour Party MP Margaret Hodge briefly used the services of Mishcon de Reya to threaten a lawsuit against Jeremy Corbyn's Labour if it pursued disciplinary action against her for verbally attacking Corbyn in the House of Commons over Labour's revision of the IHRA definition of antisemitism.

In 2019, the Court of Appeal overturned the judgment of Mr Justice Warby dated 8 October 2018 which had refused Mishcon de Reya's client, Richard Lloyd, ex-director of Which?, permission to serve a representative action on Google LLC. The claim relates to what is known as the "Safari Workaround" – Google's alleged unlawful and clandestine tracking of iPhone users in 2011 and 2012 without their consent through the use of third party cookies.

In 2020, the firm acted on behalf of 397 Hiscox Action Group members, in a £52 million claim against Hiscox Insurance for refusing to pay out on business interruption claims due to COVID-19. The Supreme Court handed down its judgment in favour of the policyholders.

In January 2025, Mishcon de Reya, through its partner Adam Rose, in collaboration with barrister Adam Wagner of Doughty Street Chambers, provided pro bono legal representation for British nationals and individuals with strong UK ties who had been held hostage in Gaza. Among those represented was Emily Damari, a British‑Israeli national, who was one of the first three hostages released under a ceasefire agreement after approximately 15 months of captivity.

As of February 2026, they were working as lawyers for Peter Mandelson, defending him against "baseless accusations" that he was going to flee the country following the release of the Epstein Files and the investigation into his conduct.

== Controversies ==
In June 2023, Mishcon de Reya settled a lawsuit arising from a dispute with its former client, the Tonstate Group, over £3.2 million (approximately $4 million) in legal fees that had been misappropriated by Edward Wojakovski, the former client who admitted diverting the funds from Tonstate Group—that he co-owned with his then father-in-law, Arthur Matyas—before being sued by the group in 2018. A judge had previously rejected Wojakovski’s claim that Matyas had consented to the extraction, a defense that had failed at London's High Court in 2019.

Tonstate subsequently sued Mishcon in 2021, asserting that the misappropriated fees were rightfully the group's property. Although Mishcon had stated at the time that "any claims will be defended robustly," the case was ultimately settled in 2023. Under the settlement terms, Mishcon agreed to pay £5.5 million plus Tonstate's legal fees, a figure notably higher than the amount initially in dispute, representing a substantial financial resolution in the case.

== See also ==
- News media phone hacking scandal reference list
