= D. D. Guttenplan =

American writer and editor of The Nation magazine

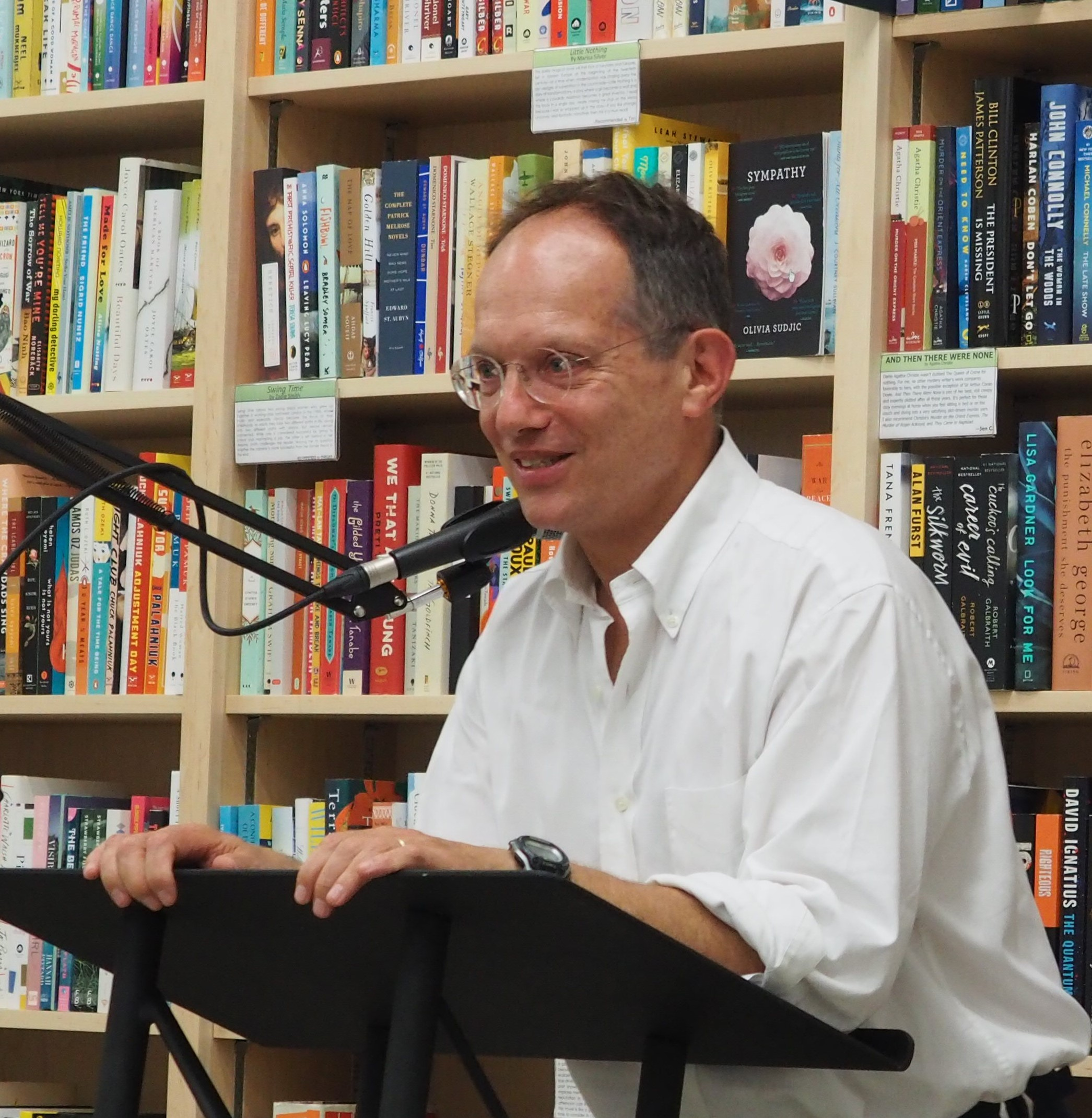
- Born: Don David Guttenplan; Portsmouth, Virginia, U.S.
- Education: Columbia University (BA); Clare College, Cambridge (BA); University College London (PhD)
- Occupations: Journalist; Editor; Writer
- Spouse: Maria Margaronis
- Children: 3, including Alexander

Don David Guttenplan is an American writer who serves as special correspondent of The Nation. A former London correspondent of the magazine, he wrote The Holocaust on Trial, a book about the Irving v Penguin Books and Lipstadt libel case while based in the UK's capital.

== Early life and education ==
Guttenplan is of U.S. Jewish origin. He was born in Portsmouth, Virginia, and was educated in the Philadelphia and Memphis public school systems before graduating with a bachelor's degree in philosophy from Columbia University in 1978, a degree in English literature from Cambridge University, and a doctorate in history from the University of London.

== Career ==
During the 1980s, he worked in New York City politics and in publishing, where his proudest achievements were drafting the bill to name a portion of Central Park "Strawberry Fields", commissioning of a biography of the anarchist Emma Goldman, and the reissue of the WPA Guide to New York City. He was also briefly lead singer for a punk band, The Editors, before leaving the group to study in Britain. This experience was background for writing pop music reviews in Vanity Fair.

After working as a senior editor at the Village Voice, editing the paper's political and news coverage and writing a cover story exposing the corrupt politics behind the proposed redevelopment of Times Square, his interests for lost causes led him to New York Newsday, where he wrote a weekly media column and covered the 1988 presidential campaign. His reporting on the 1990 Happy Land Social Club fire in the Bronx won a Page One Award from the Newspaper Guild of New York and his investigative reporting on New York City's ineffectual fire code was a finalist for the Pulitzer Prize.

Following a year as a research fellow at the Freedom Forum Media Studies centre at Columbia, Guttenplan moved to London in 1994. He has taught American History at University College and at Birkbeck College, and was a commentator on American culture and politics for the BBC.

Guttenplan worked for The Nation's London bureau from around 1996 until the 2016 United States presidential election. In 2001, Guttenplan's interest in the uses of British libel laws to silence criticism led him to write about the suit brought by British author David Irving, who claimed no Jews were killed in gas chambers at Auschwitz, against American academic Deborah Lipstadt, who had called Irving "one of the most dangerous spokespersons for Holocaust denial." Guttenplan's account of the case, The Holocaust on Trial, was described by Ian Buruma in The New Yorker as "a mixture of superb reportage and serious reflection—about the role of Jewish identity politics in the United States, antisemitism in Britain, the historiography of the Cold War, and so on." Neal Ascherson wrote: "Guttenplan sat through every day of the trial, and no wiser, more honest, or more melancholy book will ever be written about it." The Holocaust on Trial has been translated into German, Italian and Swedish.

When his friend and former teacher Edward Said became too ill to continue lecturing, Guttenplan arranged to film a series of lengthy conversations which, after Said died in 2003, became Edward Said: The Last Interview. The British journal Sight and Sound described the film as "the kind of portrait of an intellectual which is very rare," while The Times of London called it "enthralling, touching, melancholic and fierce." The New York Times pronounced it "riveting", adding "Edward Said: The Last Interview proves that a couch, a camera and a great mind can be all the inspiration a filmmaker needs."

In June 2009, Guttenplan completed a biography of I. F. Stone, the American journalist, titled American Radical: The Life and Times of I.F. Stone, published by Farrar, Straus & Giroux. This book was awarded with the 2010 Sperber Prize for Biography.

In 2018, Guttenplan's profile of nine progressive activists in the United States, The Next Republic, was published by Seven Stories Press.

Guttenplan replaced publisher Katrina vanden Heuvel as editor of The Nation on June 15, 2019.

== Personal life ==
Guttenplan was married to Maria Margaronis but they have since divorced; the couple had three children, including Alexander Guttenplan. Their son Alexander was the captain of Emmanuel College, Cambridge's 2010 winning University Challenge team.

== Books ==
- The Next Republic: the rise of a new radical majority. Seven Stories Press; Reprint Edition. 2019. ISBN 978-1609809690.
- The Nation. A Biography (The First 150 years). The Nation. 2015. ISBN 978-1940489216.
- American Radical. The Life and Times of I. F. Stone. Northwestern University Press. 2012. ISBN 978-0810128316.
- The Holocaust on Trial: history, justice and the David Irving libel case. Granta. 2001. ISBN 978-1862073975.
