= Robert Jan van Pelt =

Dutch historian

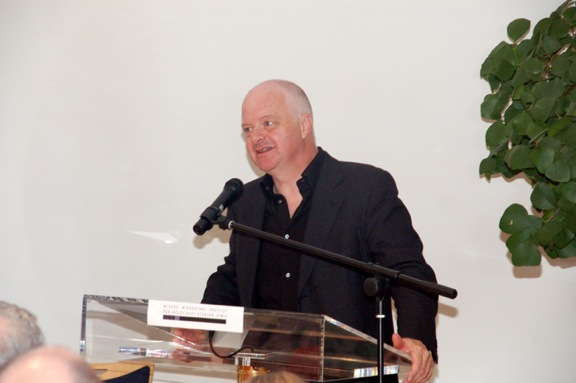
- Robert Jan van Pelt at the Fifth Simon Wiesenthal Lecture, Vienna, 16 June 2011
- Born: 15 August 1955 (age 71); Haarlem
- Occupation: Historian
- Known for: The Case for Auschwitz: Evidence from the Irving Trial

Robert Jan van Pelt (born 15 August 1955) is a Dutch author, architectural historian, professor at the University of Waterloo and a Holocaust scholar. One of the world's leading experts on Auschwitz, he regularly speaks on Holocaust related topics, through which he has come to address Holocaust denial. He was an expert witness in Deborah Lipstadt's successful defence in the civil libel suit brought against her by British author and Holocaust denier David Irving in 1996.

== Early life and career ==
Van Pelt was born in Haarlem to a secular Jewish family. At Leiden University, van Pelt obtained an undergraduate degree in art history and classical archaeology, a graduate degree in architectural history, and a PhD in the history of ideas. While pursuing his studies, he worked as an architectural historian, involved with the restoration of Noordeinde Palace in The Hague.

== Career ==
=== Teaching ===
He joined the University of Waterloo in 1987 and has taught courses pertaining to the cultural history of the Middle Ages, the Renaissance and Enlightenment periods, the 19th century, and also participates in topics including urban history and film history.

He is currently Professor of Cultural History in the university's architectural faculty.

=== Holocaust research ===
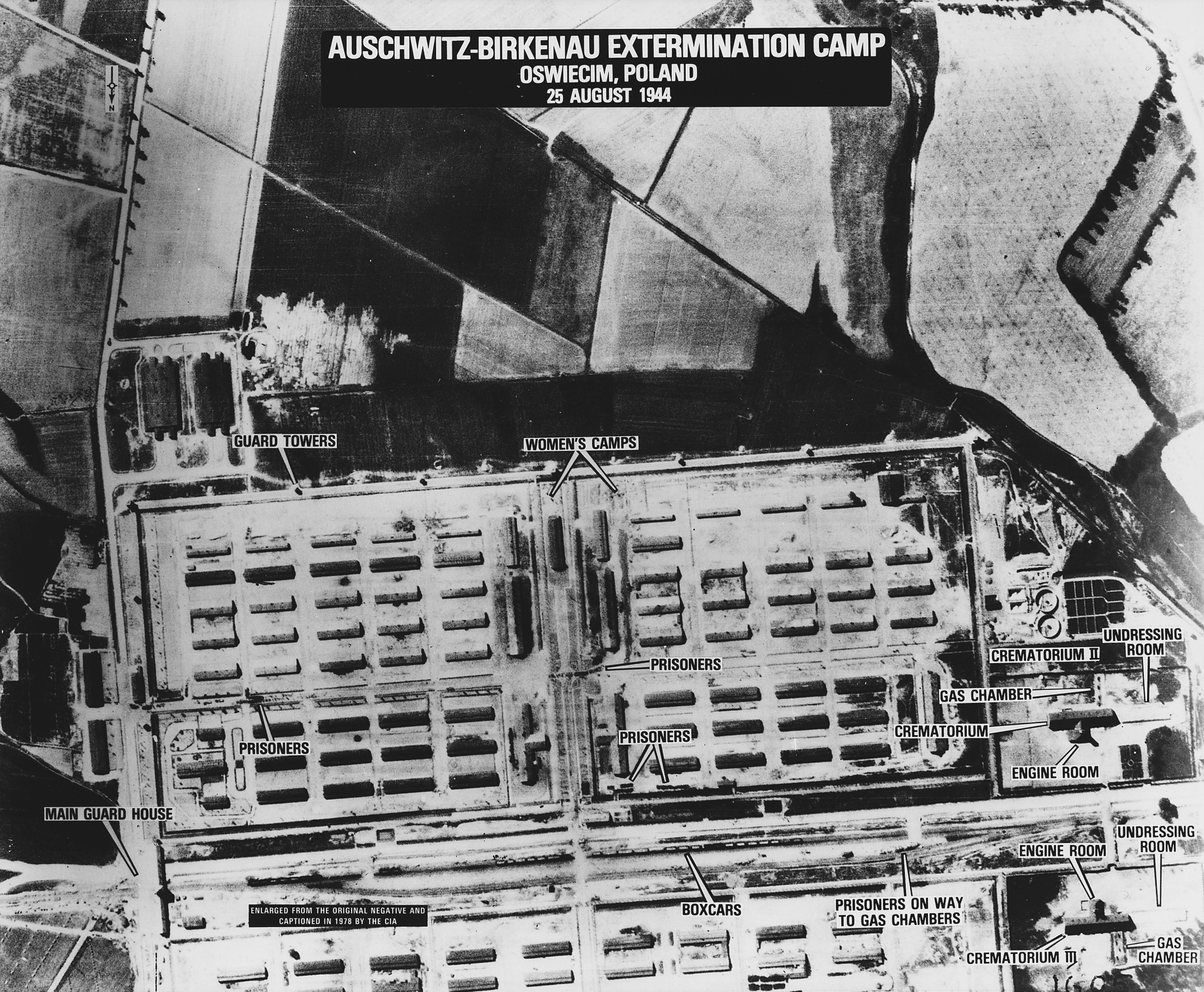
Photo of the German extermination camp at Birkenau, taken by a United States Army Air Force plane, 25 August 1944 Poland. Crematoria II and III are visible. For reference as to the date of the photo and what it shows, see The Case for Auschwitz: Evidence from the Irving Trial by van Pelt.

Van Pelt's Holocaust studies began while he was studying the Temple of Solomon under Renaissance scholar Frances Yates as part of his doctorate. He has stated that he was stunned when he first entered the Auschwitz architectural archive, commenting that the place allows one to imagine what the place looked like during the war and holds a "tactile reality" as to how the camp was built, and that here, he found his mission. His pursuit of Auschwitz as a point for architectural study arose when he nominated one of the crematoria and gas chamber complexes at Auschwitz-II Birkenau to be included in the University of Virginia architecture classes canon, a decision which he says was controversial among academics there.

In the successful defence of Deborah Lipstadt during the Irving v Penguin Books Ltd case, van Pelt was one of the four Holocaust historians who served as expert witnesses, and he defended the 770-page report he produced during five days of cross-examination.

Also in 2016, his research into the architecture of Auschwitz was presented in the exhibition Architecture as Evidence at the Venice Biennale and the Canadian Centre for Architecture.

=== Writing ===
Van Pelt has written five books and co-authored two with Debórah Dwork. He has also contributed chapters to twenty books, and has published more than thirty articles. In addition, he has served as an advisor on films and has also contributed in both the physical and dramatical reconstructions in Laurence Rees' Auschwitz: The Nazis and the 'Final Solution' television documentary. He wrote the introduction to the first English-language edition of David Koker's diary.

== Awards ==
Van Pelt's awards include University of Waterloo Outstanding Professor 2005, the National Jewish Book Award (1996) for Auschwitz: 1270 to the Present, and the Spiro Kostof Award (1997) from the Society of Architectural Historians. He was a 1994-95 fellow of the John Simon Guggenheim Memorial Foundation, and was a 2002-04 fellow of the University of Waterloo's faculty of environmental studies.

== Works ==
Books

- Architectural Principles in the Age of Historicism (1993) ISBN 978-0300057881
- Auschwitz, 1270 to the Present (1996) ISBN 978-0300067552
- Holocaust: a History (2004) ISBN 978-0393325249
- Flight from the Reich: Refugee Jews, 1933-1946 (2012) ISBN 978-0393342642
- Lodz and Getto Litzmannstadt: promised land and croaking hole of Europe (2015) ISBN 978-1329195271
- The Case for Auschwitz: Evidence from the Irving Trial (2016) ISBN 978-0253022981
- Auschwitz: Not Long Ago. Not Far Away (2020) ISBN 978-0789213310

As contributor

- "The Universal Library," in Logotopia: The Library in Architecture, Art and the Imagination. Sascha Hastings, ed. (2008). pp. 14-22. ISBN 978-1897001264

== In media ==
Van Pelt's involvement in the Irving v Penguin Books Ltd case was dramatised in the 2016 film Denial. Van Pelt was played by British actor Mark Gatiss.

Van Pelt also appeared in Errol Morris's Mr. Death: The Rise and Fall of Fred A. Leuchter, Jr., a documentary film about Fred Leuchter where he comments on and criticises Leuchter's methods and findings that constituted Leuchter's report for the defense of Ernst Zündel. In the film, van Pelt offers the analogy that the Nazis were the first Holocaust deniers, because through the obscure euphemisms and terminology they used in reference to their homicidal equipment, they attempted to deny to themselves what they were doing.

== See also ==
- List of University of Waterloo people
