= Amanda Berman =

American civil rights attorney

Amanda Berman is an American civil rights attorney. She is the founder and executive director of the Zioness Movement, also known as Zioness, a progressive Zionist organization.

== Early life and education ==
Berman graduated from the University of Pennsylvania with a major in diplomatic history. She also earned a Master of Governmental Administration from the Fels Institute of Government at the University of Pennsylvania and graduated from the Cardozo School of Law.

Berman was on the youth leadership board of Friends of the Israel Defense Forces, which raises money to support Israeli soldiers.

== Zioness Movement ==
In 2017, Berman and Brooke Goldstein set up Zioness, a liberal Zionist feminist organization that advocates for the inclusion of Zionists in progressive spaces. The group gained early visibility around the 2017 SlutWalk Chicago after participating in response to the event's exclusion of certain Zionist symbols.

Rabbi Jill Jacobs, executive director of the rabbinic human rights group T’ruah, has said the group's aim is "looking for a provocation" and "inserting a wedge issue where there is not blanket agreement.” Though the Lawfare Project initially did not disclose its involvement in the group, and Berman initially denied any connection, in a trademark dispute case in 2024 Berman stated the group was "definitely a project of the Lawfare Project".

Prior to setting up Zioness, Berman did not have a background in progressive advocacy. Despite this, Berman has expressed the view that it is possible to be both Zionist and politically progressive. She describes Zionism as a progressive liberation movement, and argues that Zionists have made longstanding contributions to progressive movements. She has called antisemitism in the British Labour Party harmful and has noted that white supremacist ideologies often target Jews for supporting other minority groups.

In 2020, Zioness issued a statement condemning the murder of George Floyd and released a guide aimed at addressing antisemitism while supporting the Black Lives Matter movement.

In late 2023, Berman criticized the comparison of racism in the United States to Israeli apartheid. She expressed concern over skepticism among feminists regarding reports of sexual violence committed by Hamas and argued against portraying the Israeli-Palestinian conflict in terms of Israel as the oppressor and Palestinians as the oppressed. She also opposed intersectional efforts that treat antisemitism and Islamophobia as equivalent or inseparable.

In August 2024, Berman stated in an interview with The Washington Post that American Jews largely still identify with the Democratic Party and believed anti-Zionism on the political left has grown since the October 7 attacks. On the sidelines at the 2024 Democratic National Convention, she moderated a Zioness panel on freedom of speech and antisemitism at universities featuring Erwin Chemerinsky and Catherine E. Lhamon.

In September 2024, Berman served as emcee at a Rosh Hashanah ceremony held at the Israeli embassy in Washington, D.C. Attendees included Michael Herzog, Deborah Lipstadt, and Anne Neuberger.

== Views on pro-Palestinian campus protests ==
In April 2024, Berman stated in an interview with NewsNation that Columbia University was not doing enough to protect Zionist Jewish students during the Columbia University pro-Palestinian campus occupations.

In November 2024, she told Moment magazine that targeting Hillel organizations on college campuses constitutes an attack on Jewish campus life.
