= Trials of the Diaspora =

2010 history book by Anthony Julius

- Author: Anthony Julius
- Language: English
- Genre: History, Jewish studies
- Publisher: Oxford University Press
- Publication date: 2010
- Publication place: United Kingdom

Trials of the Diaspora: A History of Anti-Semitism in England is a 2010 book by British lawyer Anthony Julius. The book details the role played by antisemitism in the history of the United Kingdom. The book argues that British anti-Zionism developed out of antisemitism in the United Kingdom and utilizes many of the same antisemitic tropes in its arguments.

== Reception ==
American literary critic Harold Bloom wrote a review for Trials of the Diaspora in The New York Times, praising it as "a strong, somber book on an appalling subject: the long squalor of Jew-hatred in a supposedly enlightened, humane, liberal society". Bloom further described Julius as "a truth-teller, and authentic enough to stand against the English literary and academic establishment, which essentially opposes the right of the state of Israel to exist, while indulging in the humbuggery that its anti-Zionism is not anti-Semitism," lauding the "fierce relevance" of the book in a period of increasing antisemitism. English journalist Jonathan Freedland praised the book in a review written for The New Republic, describing it as "magisterial and definitive history of a thousand years of anti-Semitism in England."

By contrast, British historian Dominic Sandbrook wrote in The Daily Telegraph that "[m]any readers... will part company with Julius in his final chapters, where he effectively suggests that criticism of Israel is inextricably bound up with anti-Semitism" and concluded by stating "[t]his strident tub-thumping is unworthy of such a learned author, and makes an unsatisfying conclusion to an otherwise thoughtful and impressive book." British writer Antony Lerman, a former researcher for the Institute of Jewish Affairs, wrote in a review of Trials of the Diaspora for The Guardian that he found Julius' project in writing this work "bankrupt", "confused" and "malign" in its conflation of anti-Zionism and criticism of Israel (including the Israeli treatment of Palestinians) with antisemitism, the meaning of which in Julius' book is in part "incomprehensible" and in Lerman's view leaves the reader thinking that, for Julius, antisemitism is whatever he says it may be.

Historian Geoffrey Alderman described Trials of the Diaspora as "set[ting] down several markers against which all future discussion of anti-Jewish prejudice – not just in England or the UK – will need to be measured". Alderman described these "markers" as being, respectively, the idea that antisemitism is deeply rooted in Christianity, the blood libel is a largely English creation, anti-Zionism is "nothing more than a fig leaf" for racism and antisemitism, the British left has a long history of antisemitism and lastly that the "toxic brew" of antisemitic anti-Zionism has become so dominant in British public discourse that even university classrooms are now dominated by "history... rewritten as fiction" serving "to delegitimise the Jewish state and thus to denigrate and defame the Jewish people. And that is what anti-Semitism is all about".
