= Zioness Movement =

American Jewish political organization

The Zioness Movement (also known as Zioness) is an American Jewish political organization that advocates for the inclusion of Zionists within the American progressive movement. It was founded by civil rights lawyers Amanda Berman and Brooke Goldstein.

== Background ==
The organization was founded in 2017 as an offshoot of the Lawfare Project, which fights the pro-Palestinian Boycott, Divestment and Sanctions movement against Israel. It was established after Berman and Goldstein learnt that the Chicago SlutWalk had banned "Zionist symbols." The pair chose to participate in the feminist march anyway, waving banners proclaiming themselves part of the "Zioness movement." Zioness describe themselves as a "multiracial coalition of Jewish activists and allies who are unabashedly progressive and unapologetically Zionist".

Brooke Goldstein supported Trump's presidential campaign in 2016 and was a frequent guest on Fox News. The group also received tens of thousands of dollars in donations from prominent conservatives, including right-wing activist Adam Milstein. By 2019, Goldstein said that Zioness was now anti-Trump, while Berman claimed that Milstein used to donate to them but no longer does after the group issued a statement condemning Trump's border policies.

In July 2024, the group established a political action committee, the Zioness Action Fund, which is registered as a 501(c)(4) fund. The PAC was unveiled at the 2024 Democratic National Convention, and later endorsed Kamala Harris in the 2024 election.

== Political activism ==
The group have been active in advocating for progressive causes, supporting abortion rights, the Black Lives Matter movement and LGBT rights.

The DNC-based launch of the Zioness Action Fund PAC received considerable media attention, with Slate reporting that attendees included congresswoman Debbie Wasserman Schultz, congressman Brad Schneider and political commentator Van Jones. Both the organization and the affiliated PAC defended Kamala Harris against criticisms from other Jews that a Democratic presidency would endanger American Jews.

Zioness Action Fund endorsed Harris in the 2024 election. They were one of the few pro-Israel groups to criticize the arrest of activist Mahmoud Khalil, though they stated he was a "raging antisemite".

Rabbi Jill Jacobs, executive director of the rabbinic human rights group T'ruah, has criticized the group as "looking for a provocation" and "inserting a wedge issue where there is not blanket agreement."
