= Richard Rampton =

British libel lawyer (1941–2023)

Richard Rampton KC (8 January 1941 – 23 December 2023) was a British libel lawyer. He was involved in several high-profile cases including Irving v. Penguin Books and Lipstadt, where he defended Deborah Lipstadt and Penguin Books against David Irving.

== Early life and education ==
Rampton was born in Norwich on 8 January 1941, the eldest son of businessman and philanthropist Tony Rampton and his wife Joan (nee Shanks). He was educated at Bryanston School and read Classics at The Queen's College, Oxford.

== Career ==
Richard Rampton was called to the Bar in November 1965 (Inner Temple) and was appointed a QC (Queen's Counsel) in 1987.

In Irving v. Penguin Books and Lipstadt, he represented Deborah Lipstadt and her publisher against false accusations of libel after she said that Irving was a Holocaust denier in her book Denying the Holocaust (1993). The trial was dramatised in the film Denial in which Rampton was played by Tom Wilkinson.

Rampton also represented McDonald's in the McLibel case, where the company sued two members of the London Greenpeace environmental campaigning group.

Rampton's earlier cases include Andrew Neil (editor of The Sunday Times) vs Peregrine Worsthorne, Lord Aldington vs Count Nikolai Tolstoy and Gillian Taylforth vs News of the World. He also successfully represented politician George Galloway against The Daily Telegraph over allegations that he took £375,000 from Saddam Hussein's Iraqi regime. He represented Associated Newspapers Group plc in Lucas-Box v News Group Newspapers Ltd; Lucas-Box v Associated Newspapers Group plc and others. This case produced the "Lucas-Box meaning" whereby under modern libel practice a defendant must set out in his/her statement of case the defamatory meaning that he/she seeks to prove to be essentially or substantially true.

== Personal life ==
Rampton married his childhood sweetheart Carolyn Clarke in 1963. They had two sons and one daughter.

== Death ==
Rampton died on 23 December 2023, at the age of 82.
