= Denial (2016 film) =

- Theatrical release poster
- Directed by: Mick Jackson
- Screenplay by: David Hare
- Based on: History on Trial: My Day in Court with a Holocaust Denier by Deborah Lipstadt
- Produced by: Gary Foster; Russ Krasnoff
- Starring: Rachel Weisz; Tom Wilkinson; Timothy Spall; Andrew Scott; Jack Lowden; Caren Pistorius; Alex Jennings
- Cinematography: Haris Zambarloukos
- Edited by: Justine Wright
- Music by: Howard Shore
- Production companies: Krasnoff/Foster Entertainment; Shoebox Films; Participant Media; BBC Films
- Distributed by: Bleecker Street (North America); Entertainment One (United Kingdom)
- Release dates: 11 September 2016 (TIFF); 30 September 2016 (United States); 27 January 2017 (United Kingdom)
- Running time: 110 minutes
- Countries: United Kingdom; United States
- Language: English
- Budget: $10 million
- Box office: $9.2 million

Denial is a 2016 biographical film directed by Mick Jackson and written by David Hare, based on Deborah Lipstadt's 2005 book History on Trial: My Day in Court with a Holocaust Denier. It dramatises the Irving v Penguin Books Ltd case, in which Lipstadt, a Holocaust scholar, was sued by David Irving, a Holocaust denier, for libel. It stars Rachel Weisz, Tom Wilkinson, Timothy Spall, Andrew Scott, Jack Lowden, Caren Pistorius and Alex Jennings.

Denial premiered at the Toronto International Film Festival on 11 September 2016. It was theatrically released in the United States by Bleecker Street on 30 September 2016, and in the United Kingdom by Entertainment One on 27 January 2017.

== Plot ==
Deborah Lipstadt is an American professor of Holocaust studies whose speaking engagement is disrupted by David Irving, a British writer on Nazi Germany. He files a libel lawsuit in the United Kingdom against Lipstadt and her publisher for declaring him a Holocaust denier in her books. As the burden of proof in UK libel cases lies with the defendant, Lipstadt and her legal team, led by Anthony Julius and Richard Rampton, must prove that Irving lied about the Holocaust.

To prepare their defence, Lipstadt and Rampton tour the site of the former Auschwitz concentration camp in Poland. The historian Robert van Pelt explains the operation of the gas chambers, while the research team subpoenas Irving's extensive personal diaries. Lipstadt is annoyed by Rampton's apparently disrespectful questions; the team reduces her involvement in the case, arguing that she harms its chances of success. Members of the British Jewish community plead with her to settle out of court to avoid creating publicity for Irving. However, her team has a promising start when they persuade Irving, by appealing to his ego, to agree to a trial by judge instead of a jury, which he could have manipulated to his advantage.

Irving conducts his own legal representation, facing Lipstadt's legal team. Irving endeavours to twist the presented evidence for the defence. Lipstadt is approached by a Holocaust survivor who pleads for the chance to testify, but Lipstadt's legal team insists on focusing the trial on Irving.

Irving tries to discredit van Pelt's evidence for the existence of gas chambers at Auschwitz, claiming there were no holes on the roof for the Zyklon B gas crystals to be introduced. His slogan "no holes, no Holocaust" dominates the media coverage. Furious, Lipstadt demands that she and the Holocaust survivors be allowed to take the stand. Julius angrily counters that Irving would only humiliate and exploit a survivor on cross-examination, as he has in the past. Rampton visits Lipstadt at her home to explain his approach and earns her trust. In court, he subjects Irving to a skillful cross-examination and exposes his claims as absurd, while expert testimony from respected scholars such as Richard J. Evans expose the distortions in Irving's writings.

As the trial concludes, the judge, Charles Gray, worries the defence by suggesting that, if Irving honestly believes his own claims, he cannot be lying as Lipstadt asserted; Rampton counters that Irving's antisemitism is in fact the proof that his falsification of history was deliberate. Gray eventually rules for the defence, however, convinced of the truth of Lipstadt's portrayal of Irving as deceitful. Lipstadt is hailed for her dignified demeanour, while her legal team reminds her that, despite her silence during the trial, it was her writing that countered Irving's lies and provided the basis for the victory. At a press conference, Lipstadt praises her lawyers for their strategy. Later, Lipstadt and Julius watch Irving in a TV interview as he claims that many things in the trial went towards him. He states that he still denies the Holocaust happening.

== Cast ==
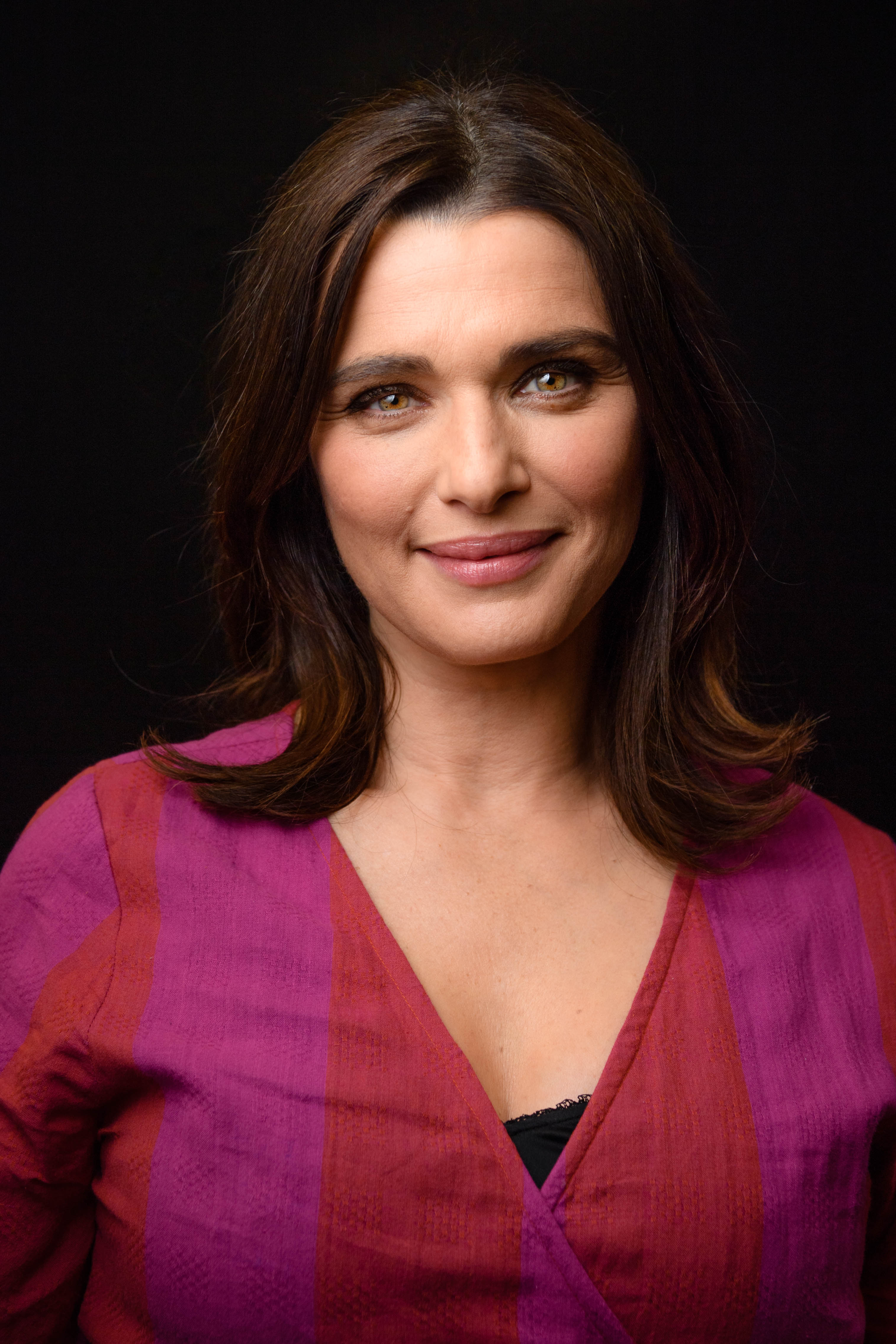
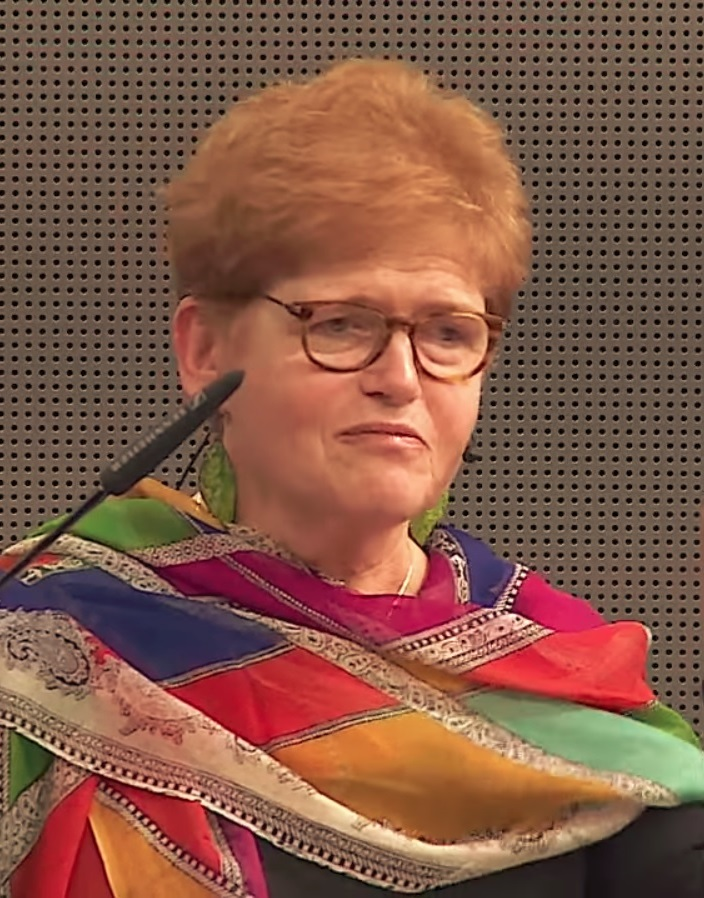
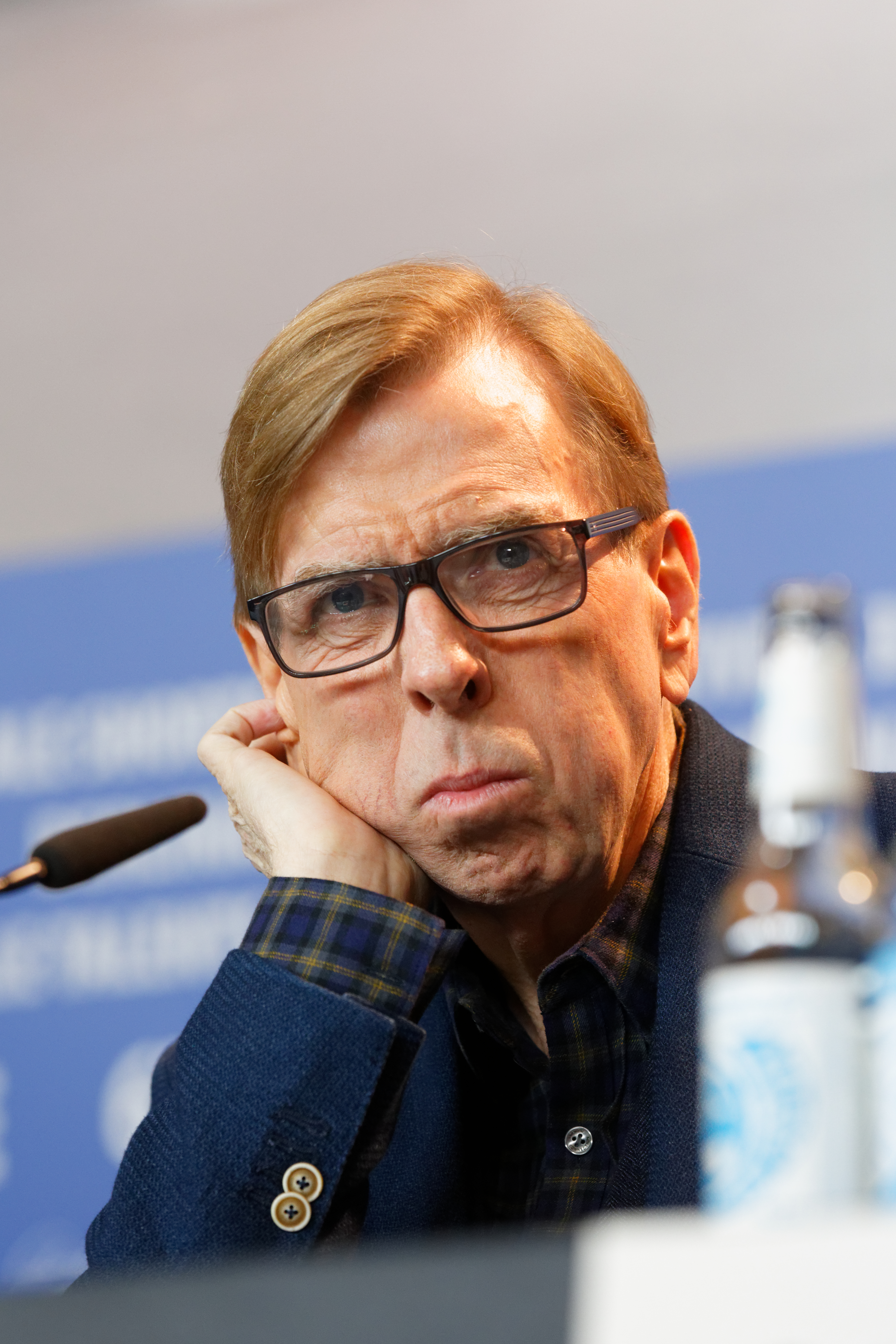
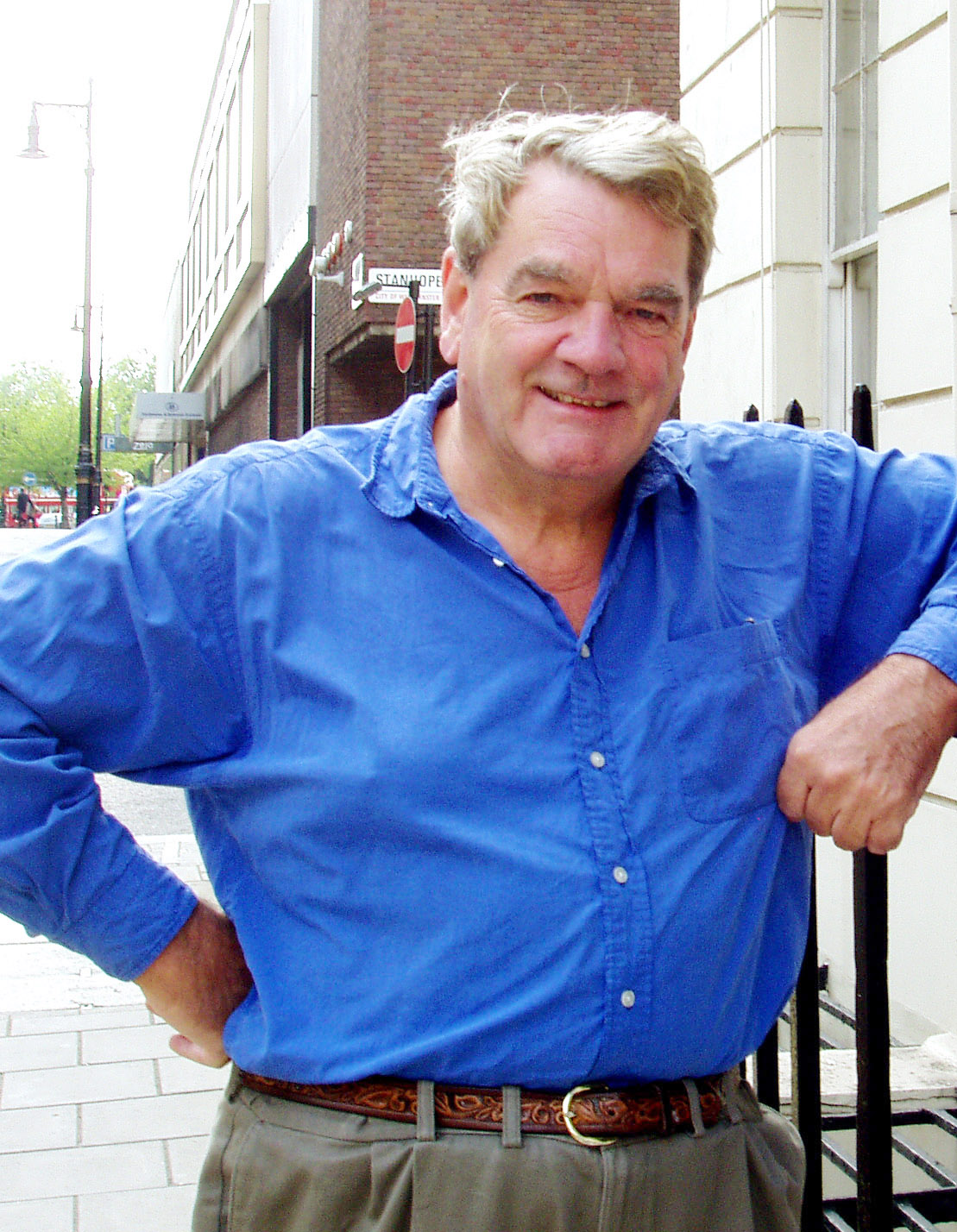
Rachel Weisz plays Deborah Lipstadt and Timothy Spall plays David Irving.
- Rachel Weisz as Deborah Lipstadt
- Tom Wilkinson as Richard Rampton
- Timothy Spall as David Irving
- Andrew Scott as Anthony Julius
- Jack Lowden as James Libson
- Caren Pistorius as Laura Tyler
- Alex Jennings as Sir Charles Gray
- Mark Gatiss as Robert Jan van Pelt
- Andrea Deck as Leonie
- Sally Messham as Meg
- Sean Power as Mitch
- John Sessions as Professor Richard Evans
- Nikki Amuka-Bird as Lilly Holbrook
- Harriet Walter as Vera Reich

== Production ==
In April 2015, Hilary Swank and Tom Wilkinson were selected to star in the film, based on the book History on Trial: My Day in Court with a Holocaust Denier by Deborah Lipstadt, with Mick Jackson directing, and Gary Foster and Russ Krasnoff producing under their Krasnoff/Foster Entertainment banner with Shoebox Films. Participant Media and BBC Films co-financed. In November 2015, Rachel Weisz replaced Swank, and Timothy Spall joined the cast, with Bleecker Street distributing the film. In December 2015, Andrew Scott, Jack Lowden, Caren Pistorius, Alex Jennings, and Harriet Walter joined the cast. Howard Shore composed the film's score.

Principal photography began in December 2015 and concluded by the end of January 2016. Denial was filmed in London and at the Auschwitz-Birkenau State Museum, Poland.

== Release ==
The film had its world premiere at the Toronto International Film Festival on 11 September 2016. The film was released in the United States in a limited release on 30 September 2016, and in the United Kingdom on 27 January 2017.

== Reception ==
=== Critical reception ===
Denial received positive reviews from critics. On the review aggregator website Rotten Tomatoes, the film has an approval rating of 82%, based on 170 reviews, with an average grade of 6.80/10. The website's critical consensus reads, "If Denial doesn't quite do its incredible story complete justice, it comes close enough to offer a satisfying, impactful drama – and another powerful performance from Rachel Weisz." On Metacritic, the film has a score of 63 out of 100, based on 34 critics. The film had a production budget of $10 million and a worldwide box office of about $9 million.

=== Accolades ===
Award	Date of ceremony	Category	Recipient(s)	Result	Ref(s)
AARP Annual Movies for Grownups Awards	6 February 2017	Best Supporting Actor	Timothy Spall	Nominated	
British Academy Film Awards	12 February 2017	Best British Film	Gary Foster, David Hare and Russ Krasnoff	Nominated	
