= Deborah Lipstadt =

American diplomat and Holocaust historian (born 1947)

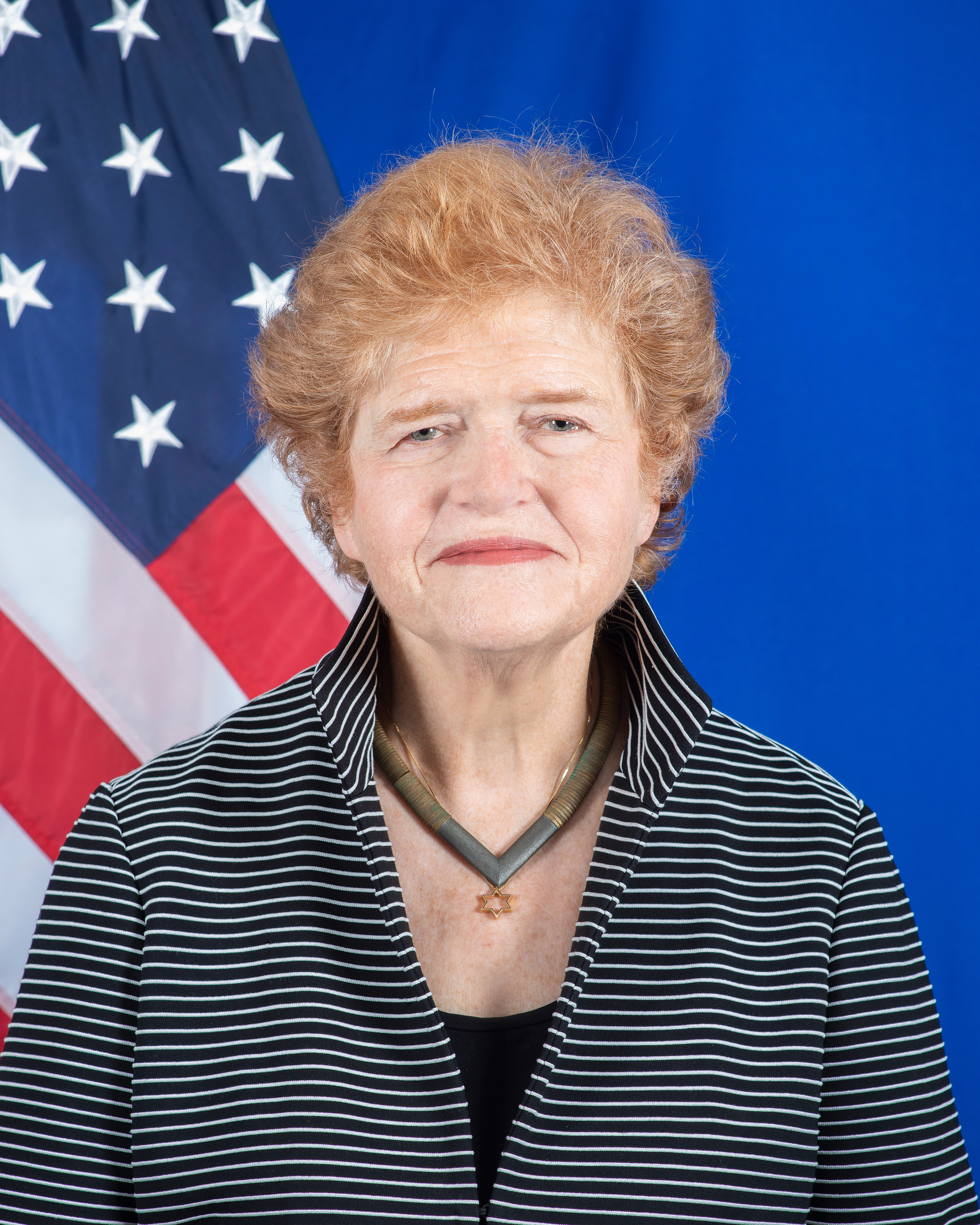
- Official portrait, 2022

United States Special Envoy for Monitoring and Combating Antisemitism
- In office May 3, 2022 – January 20, 2025
- President: Joe Biden
- Preceded by: Elan Carr
- Succeeded by: Yehuda Kaploun

Personal details
- Born: Deborah Esther Lipstadt; March 18, 1947 (age 79) New York City, New York, U.S.
- Education: City College of New York (BA); Brandeis University (MA, PhD)

Deborah Esther Lipstadt (Note: Pronounced /ˈlɪpstæt/ LIP-stat) (born March 18, 1947) is an American historian and diplomat. She is the author of Denying the Holocaust (1993), History on Trial: My Day in Court with a Holocaust Denier (2005), The Eichmann Trial (2011), and Antisemitism: Here and Now (2019). She served as the United States special envoy for monitoring and combating anti-semitism from 2022 to 2025. Since 1993 she has been the Dorot Professor of Modern Jewish History and Holocaust Studies at Emory University in Atlanta, Georgia.

Lipstadt was a consultant to the United States Holocaust Memorial Museum. In 1994, President Bill Clinton appointed her to the United States Holocaust Memorial Council, and she served two terms. On July 30, 2021, President Joe Biden nominated her to be the special envoy for monitoring and combating anti-semitism. She was confirmed by voice-vote on March 30, 2022, and sworn in on May 3, 2022. She served in that position until January 2025. Lipstadt was named one of the 100 most influential people in the world by Time magazine in 2023.

== Life and career ==
Lipstadt was born in New York City to a Jewish family, the daughter of Miriam (née Peiman) and Erwin Lipstadt. Her mother was born in Canada, and her father, a salesman, was born in Germany. Her parents met at their neighborhood synagogue. She has an older sister, Helene, a historian, and a younger brother, Nathaniel, an investor on Wall Street.

In her youth, she studied at the Hebrew Institute of Long Island, and grew up in Far Rockaway, Queens. She studied with Rabbi Emanuel Rackman at Temple Shaarei Tefillah. Lipstadt spent summers at Camp Massad.

She spent her junior year of college — which turned out to include the Six-Day War — in Israel, where she stayed as an exchange student at the Hebrew University of Jerusalem. She completed a Bachelor of Arts in American history at the City College of New York in 1969. She then enrolled at Brandeis University where she completed her master's degree in 1972 and then her Ph.D. in Near Eastern and Judaic Studies in 1976. Her doctoral dissertation was entitled "The Zionist Career of Louis Lipsky, 1900–1921".

After receiving her Ph.D., Lipstadt began teaching, first at the University of Washington in Seattle from 1974 to 1979, then as an assistant professor at UCLA. When she was denied tenure there, she left in 1985 to be the director of the independent Brandeis-Bardin Institute for two years, during which time she also wrote a monthly column for The Jewish Spectator. Lipstadt then received a research fellowship from the Vidal Sassoon International Center for the Study of Antisemitism at Hebrew University of Jerusalem, during which she studied Holocaust denial, and taught at Occidental College in Los Angeles part time.

Lipstadt then became an assistant professor of religion at Emory University in Atlanta, Georgia in January 1993, becoming the Dorot Professor of Modern Jewish and Holocaust Studies that fall. She helped to create the Tam Institute for Jewish Studies there. She considered teaching as a visiting professor at Columbia University but states she did not take the post, citing her belief that she would be a "sop" for Columbia to use to show it was fighting antisemitism when she believed that to not be the case.

=== US antisemitism envoy ===
In May 2021, Lipstadt was considered for an ambassadorship position at the Office to Monitor and Combat Anti-Semitism in the Biden administration.

On July 30, 2021, President Joe Biden nominated Lipstadt for this role. Opposition from Senator Ron Johnson, whom Lipstadt had accused in a tweet of advocating "white supremacy/nationalism," delayed her nomination for many months. Her initial nomination expired at the end of that year and was returned to President Biden on January 3, 2022.

The Senate Foreign Relations Committee held hearings on her nomination on February 8, 2022. On March 29, 2022, the committee favorably reported her nomination out of committee. Her nomination was supported by all committee Democrats, as well as Republican senators Mitt Romney and Marco Rubio. It was confirmed by voice vote on March 30, 2022, and she was sworn in on May 3, 2022.

Lipstadt was part of the Biden administration team that launched the U.S. National Strategy to Counter Antisemitism on May 25, 2023.

On October 17, 2023, in a joint statement with Michal Cotler-Wunsh (Israel's antisemitism envoy), published by the U.S. State Department, Lipstadt condemned the October 7 attacks.

In September 2024, Lipstadt attended the Jewish New Year ceremony at the Israeli embassy in Washington, D.C. with Israeli Ambassador Michael Herzog, Zioness founder Amanda Berman, and cybertechnology official Anne Neuberger.

Lipstadt is noted for being among the commentators who imply that antisemitism is an eternal phenomenon. She once likened antisemitism to "a virus without a cure," which researcher Steven Beller criticized as inaccurate and absolving antisemites of responsibility. Although Lipstadt often distinguished between "legitimate criticism of Israel," and criticism that "crossed the line" into antisemitism, she did not specify where she considered that line to be, specifically whether other democratic visions than the two-state solution were antisemitic.

== David Irving libel suit ==
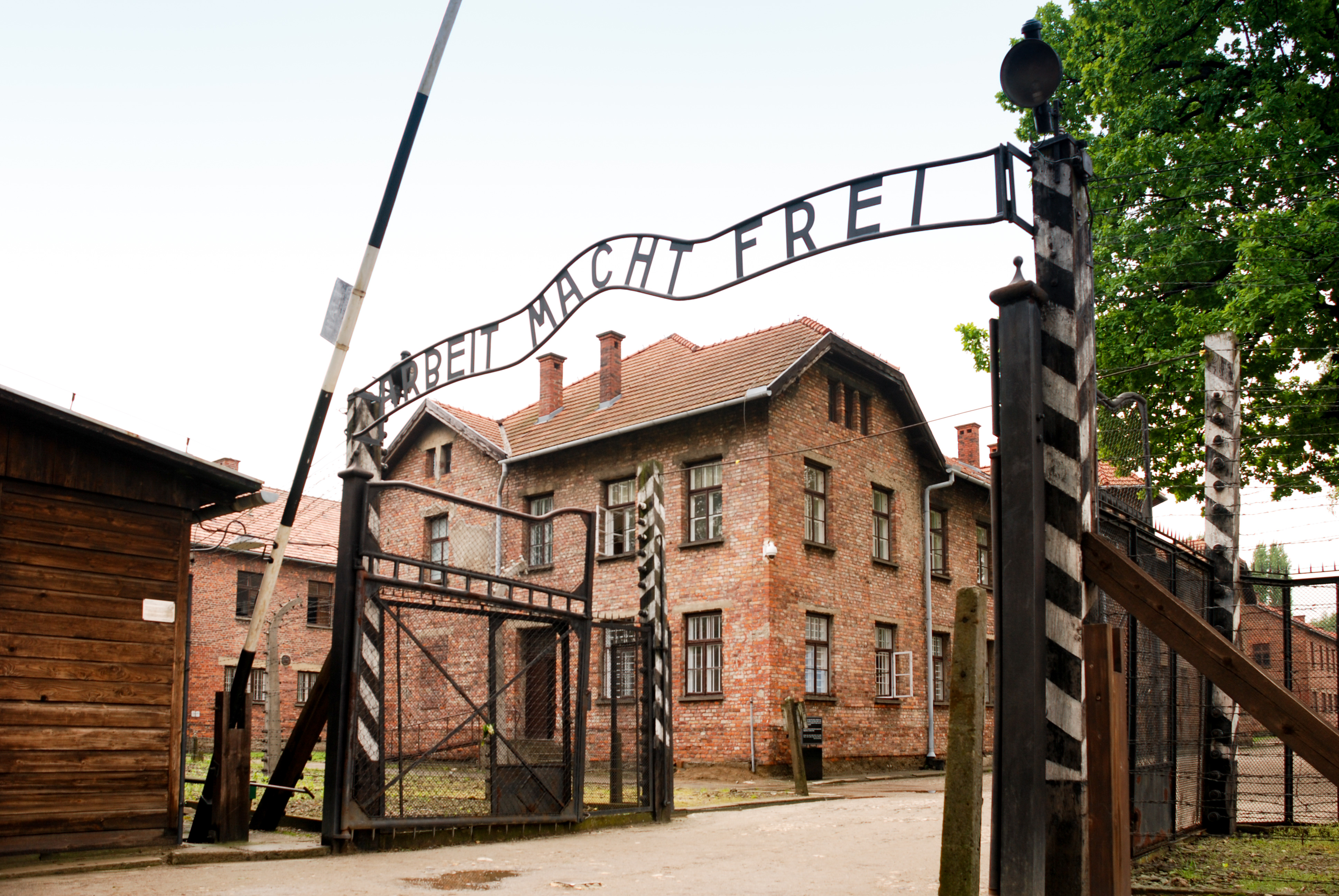
The entrance to Auschwitz I

On September 5, 1996, author David Irving sued Lipstadt and her publisher Penguin Books for libel in an English court for characterizing some of his writings and public statements as Holocaust denial in her book Denying the Holocaust: The Growing Assault on Truth and Memory.

Lipstadt's legal defense team was led by Anthony Julius of Mishcon de Reya while Penguin's was led by Kevin Bays and Mark Bateman of Davenport Lyons. Both defendants instructed Richard Rampton QC, while Penguin also instructed Heather Rogers as junior counsel. The expert witnesses for the defence included Cambridge historian Richard J. Evans, Christopher Browning, Robert Jan van Pelt, and Peter Longerich.

English libel law places the burden of proof on the defendant rather than the plaintiff. Lipstadt and Penguin won the case using the justification defense, namely by demonstrating in court that Lipstadt's accusations against Irving were substantially true and therefore not libelous. The case was argued as a bench trial before Mr Justice Gray, who produced a written judgment 349 pages long detailing Irving's systematic distortion of the historical record of World War II. The Times (April 14, 2000, p. 23) said of Lipstadt's victory, "History has had its day in court and scored a crushing victory."

Despite her acrimonious history with Irving, Lipstadt has stated that she is personally opposed to the three-year prison sentence Austria imposed on Irving for two speeches he made in 1989, where he claimed there had been no gas chambers at Auschwitz. In Austria, minimizing the atrocities of the Third Reich is a crime punishable with up to ten years' imprisonment. Speaking of Irving, Lipstadt said, "I am uncomfortable with imprisoning people for speech. Let him go and let him fade from everyone's radar screens ... Generally, I don't think Holocaust denial should be a crime. I am a free speech person, I am against censorship."

== Commentary ==
In February 2007, Lipstadt warned of "soft-core denial" at the Zionist Federation's annual fundraising dinner in London. Referring to groups such as the Muslim Council of Britain, reportedly she stated: "When groups of people refuse to commemorate Holocaust Memorial Day unless equal time is given to anti-Muslim prejudice, this is soft-core denial." According to Jonny Paul, "She received huge applause when she asked how former United States President Jimmy Carter could omit the years 1939–1947 from a chronology in his book"; referring to his recently published and controversial book Palestine: Peace Not Apartheid, she said: "When a former president of the United States writes a book on the Israeli–Palestinian crisis and writes a chronology at the beginning of the book in order to help them understand the emergence of the situation and in that chronology lists nothing of importance between 1939 and 1947, that is soft-core denial."

Along the same lines, Lipstadt has criticized the German philosopher and historian Ernst Nolte for engaging in what she calls "soft-core denial" of the Holocaust, arguing that Nolte practices an even more dangerous form of negationism than the Holocaust deniers. Speaking of Nolte in a 2003 interview, Lipstadt stated:

Historians such as the German Ernst Nolte are, in some ways, even more, dangerous than the deniers. Nolte is an anti-Semite of the first order, who attempts to rehabilitate Hitler by saying that he was no worse than Stalin; but he is careful not to deny the Holocaust. Holocaust-deniers make Nolte's life more comfortable. They have, with their radical argumentation, pulled the center a little more to their side. Consequently, a less radical extremist, such as Nolte, finds himself closer to the middle ground, which makes him more dangerous.

In late 2011, Lipstadt attacked American and Israeli politicians for what she called their invocation of the Holocaust for contemporary political purposes, something she thought mangled history. She rebuked Republican Party presidential candidates for speeches that 'pandered' to the Evangelical constituency, as much as it did to the Republican Jewish Coalition. She also judged Howard Gutman's remarks on causal links between Muslim antisemitism and the Israeli–Palestinian conflict as "stupid". According to Haaretz, "She decried the 'hysteria' and 'neuroses' of many Jews and Israelis who compare the current situation in Europe and in the Middle East to the Holocaust-era":

People go nuts here, they go nuts. There's no nuance, there's no middle ground, it's taking any shade of grey and stomping on it. There are no voices of calm, there are no voices of reason, not in this country, not in Israel.

In the same interview, she argued that "If anti-Semitism becomes the reason through which your Jewish view of the world is refracted, if it becomes your prism, then it is very unhealthy. Jewish tradition never wanted that." She said "You listen to Newt Gingrich talking about the Palestinians as an 'invented people'—it's out-Aipacking AIPAC, it's out-Israeling Israel". On a visit to London in September 2014, Lipstadt criticized the Israeli government and said that the government had "cheapened" the memory of the Holocaust by using it to justify war. She has also rejected the view that Israeli military actions during the 2014 Israel–Gaza conflict constituted a genocide.

Lipstadt returned to the theme of soft-core Holocaust denial in The Atlantic when responding to the Trump administration's statement on International Holocaust Remembrance Day, January 27, 2017, which was condemned for the absence of a specific mention of Jews, as the principal victims of the Holocaust or of antisemitism itself. "The Holocaust was de-Judaized. It is possible that it all began with a mistake. Someone simply did not realize what they were doing. It is also possible that someone did this deliberately."

In February 2019, Lipstadt resigned her membership in the Young Israel synagogue movement because its national council president defended Israeli Prime Minister Benjamin Netanyahu's facilitation of a merger between the Bayit Yehudi party and the extremist Otzma Yehudit party.

In October 2019, Lipstadt had a letter to the editor published in The New York Times, prompted by the awarding of the Nobel Prize in Literature to Peter Handke, in which she wrote that the Nobel Committee awarded Handke a platform "he does not deserve" and that "the public does not need him to have", adding that such a platform could convince some that his "false claims must have some legitimacy".

In 2020, Lipstadt’s interview in ‘’Confronting Holocaust Denial’’ with David Baddiel focuses on her landmark legal battle against Holocaust denier David Irving and the broader question of whether deniers should ever be given a public platform. In the documentary, Lipstadt discusses the emotional and intellectual toll of the trial, the strategies used by deniers to distort historical fact, and the importance of confronting falsehoods directly rather than allowing them to circulate unchallenged. Her conversation with Baddiel underscores the documentary’s central theme: that rigorous historical scholarship and survivor testimony remain essential tools in countering denialism.

In September 2024, while speaking at a summit of the Israeli-American Council, she responded to a statement suggesting "After October 7, there was a feeling around the world that Israel was weaker," by asking the questioner, "Do you want a beeper?", referencing the 2024 Lebanon electronic device attacks which injured thousands and killed at least 42 people, including two children. She was criticized by CAIR for "her flippant celebration of state-sponsored terrorism."

In January 2025, Lipstadt said in Brussels: "We are at an inflection point. Antisemitism is becoming increasingly normalized...[antisemitic comments] are freely heard on streets of some of our leading Western democracies in many countries, including this country." In April, Lipstadt disagreed with the characterisation of the activists targeted for deportation under the second Trump presidency as 'martyrs and heroes'. In a later interview with Isaac Chotiner, she blamed universities for "opening the door" to the Trump administration's deportation campaign.

In January 2026, Lipstadt asserted that an arson attack on the Beth Israel Congregation in Jackson, Mississippi was "another step in the globalization of the intifada." She walked back her comment after the arsonist was revealed to have been motivated by far-right antisemitism and not the pro-Palestinian movement.

== Awards and honors ==
After the publication of Denying the Holocaust in June 1993, Lipstadt received the 1994 National Jewish Book Award. Already a consultant to the United States Holocaust Memorial Museum, President Bill Clinton appointed her in 1994 to the United States Holocaust Memorial Council. In 1997, Lipstadt received the Emory Williams teaching award for excellence in teaching. She is also a recipient of the Albert D. Chernin Award from the Jewish Council for Public Affairs, which is given to "an American Jew whose work best exemplifies the social justice imperatives of Judaism, Jewish history and the protection of the Bill of Rights, particularly the First Amendment." Previous recipients of the Award include Ruth Bader Ginsburg and Alan Dershowitz. Lipstadt was awarded the 2005 National Jewish Book Award in the Holocaust category for History on Trial: My Day in Court with a Holocaust Denier and the 2019 National Jewish Book Award in Education and Jewish Identity for Antisemitism: Here and Now. In 2026, she received Bar-Ilan University's Jonathan Sacks Institute Prize for "Outstanding Achievement as a Public Intellectual."

Lipstadt has received honorary doctorates from a number of institutions, including Ohio Wesleyan University, John Jay College of Criminal Justice of the City University of New York, Yeshiva University, the Jewish Theological Seminary of America, and Washington University in St. Louis, among others.

== Works ==
Autobiographies

- History on Trial: My Day in Court with a Holocaust Denier (2005), memoir

Biographies

- The Zionist Career of Louis Lipsky, 1900–1921 (1982), Lipstadt's dissertation as a book, written in 1976
- Golda Meir (2023)

History

- An Outline of American Zionist History 1759–1948 (1971)
- Beyond Belief: The American Press and the Coming of the Holocaust, 1933–1945 (1985)
- Denying the Holocaust: The Growing Assault on Truth and Memory (1993)
- The Eichmann Trial (2011)
- Holocaust: An American Understanding (2016)
- Antisemitism: Here and Now (2018)

== In popular culture ==
- Actress Rachel Weisz portrayed Lipstadt in Denial (2016), a film based on her 2005 book History on Trial: My Day in Court with David Irving, directed by Mick Jackson.
