= Denying the Holocaust =

1993 book by Deborah Lipstadt

Denying the Holocaust: The Growing Assault on Truth and Memory
- Cover of the first edition
- Author: Deborah Lipstadt
- Language: English
- Subject: Holocaust denial
- Published: 1993
- Publisher: Free Press (United States), Penguin Books (United Kingdom)
- Publication place: United States
- Media type: Print (Hardcover and Paperback)
- ISBN: 978-0452272743

Denying the Holocaust: The Growing Assault on Truth and Memory is a 1993 book by the historian Deborah Lipstadt, in which the author discusses the Holocaust denial movement. Lipstadt named British writer David Irving as a Holocaust denier, leading him to sue her unsuccessfully for libel (see Irving v Penguin Books Ltd). She gives a detailed explanation of how people came to deny the Holocaust or claim that it was vastly exaggerated by the Jews.

== Increasing antisemitism ==
Lipstadt sees Holocaust denial as "purely anti-Semitic diatribe" and a form of pseudo-history; she outlines the history of Holocaust denial, claims that it is increasing and should not be disregarded. Holocaust deniers were originally a "lunatic fringe" and could be seen as harmless cranks but are now more numerous and influential than before as some radical racist groups have adopted it, and that the trend could increase as Holocaust witnesses die of age.

== Nature of holocaust denial ==
Lipstadt claims that after World War II in France Maurice Bardèche and Paul Rassinier denied outright that the Holocaust ever happened, as did various Nazi sympathizers in America. According to Lipstadt, Austin App, a professor of English at La Salle College and the University of Scranton, first put out several notions that later Holocaust deniers followed. App and others denied that the Nazis had any genocidal intent, that gas chambers existed, and that innocent Jews were killed by the millions, and they claimed that defeated Germany was compelled to admit false crimes by the Allies. From these beginnings, she details how these charges were picked up and became "a tool of the radical right".

Lipstadt gives many examples of allegations that six million Jews were not systematically exterminated, but, rather, 300,000 to 1.5 million Jews died of disease and other causes. Lipstadt shows that (at the time of writing) tens of thousands of witnesses of the Holocaust were still alive and there is conclusive documentary evidence for it. Lipstadt claims that distorting history in this way risks undermining the western tradition of objective scholarship i.e. the scientific method and make distorting history for political purposes appear legitimate.

== People described as Holocaust deniers ==
She accuses groups like the Institute for Historical Review and people like David Duke of spreading lies about the Holocaust. Lipstadt claims this is now an international movement where Holocaust deniers call themselves 'research centres', for example, and produce what they say are independent publications to make themselves look more scientific than they are. In Lipstadt's opinion current value relativism helps Holocaust denial to thrive.

Among those described as Holocaust deniers in Denying the Holocaust are:

- Austin App
- Arthur Butz
- Robert Faurisson
- Roger Garaudy
- David Hoggan
- David Irving
- Paul Rassinier
- Bradley R. Smith
- Richard Verrall
- Ernst Zündel and Fred A. Leuchter

== See also ==
- Denial (2016 film)
