= Bibliography of European history =

This is a bibliography of European history focused on some of the main books in English.

== Surveys ==
- Blum, Jerome et al. The European World (2 vol. 2nd ed. 1970) university textbook; online
- Davies, Norman. Europe: A History (1998), advanced university textbook
- Gay, Peter and R.K. Webb Modern Europe: To 1815 (1973) online, university textbook
  - Gay, Peter and R.K. Webb Modern Europe: Since 1815 (1973), university textbook
- Gooch, Brison D. ed. Interpreting European history. 1: From the renaissance to Napoleon (1967) online and Interpreting European history 2: from Metternich to Present (1967). online; readings by scholars
- McKay, John P. et al. A History of Western Society (13th ed.; 2 vol 2020) 1300 pp; university textbook
- Moncure, James A. ed. Research Guide to European Historical Biography: 1450–Present (4 vol 1992); 2140 pp; historiographical guide to 200 major political and military leaders
- Roberts, J.M. The Penguin History of Europe (1998), survey; excerpt
- Simms, Brendan. Europe: The Struggle for Supremacy, from 1453 to the Present (2013), survey, with emphasis on Germany
- Stearns, Peter, ed. The Encyclopedia of World History (2001); comprehensive global coverage

== Geography and atlases ==
- Black, Jeremy. A History of the Second World War in 100 Maps (2020)
- Cambridge Modern History Atlas (1912) online 141 maps
- Catchpole, Brian. Map History of the Modern World (1982)
- Darby, H. C., and H. Fullard, eds. The New Cambridge Modern History, Vol. 14: Atlas (1970)
- East, W. Gordon. An Historical Geography of Europe (4th ed. 1950)
- Haywood, John. Atlas of world history (1997) online
- Horrabin, J.F. An Atlas History of the Second Great War (9 vol 1941–45) 7 vol online
- Kinder, Hermann and Werner Hilgemann. Anchor Atlas of World History (2 vol. 1978); advanced analytical maps, mostly of Europe
- O'Brian, Patrick K. Atlas of World History (2007) Online free
- Pounds, Norman J. G. (1990). An Historical Geography of Europe. doi:10.1017/CBO9780511572265. ISBN 9780521311090.
- Rand McNally Atlas of World History (1983), maps #76–81. Published in Britain as the Hamlyn Historical Atlas online
- Robertson, Charles Grant. An historical atlas of modern Europe from 1789 to 1922 with an historical and explanatory text (1922) online
- Schenk, Frithjof Benjamin, Mental Maps: The Cognitive Mapping of the Continent as an Object of Research of European History, EGO – European History Online, Mainz: Institute of European History, 2013, retrieved: 4 March 2020
- Talbert, Richard J.A. Barrington Atlas of the Greek and Roman World for iPad (Princeton UP 2014) ISBN 978-1-4008-4876-8; 102 interactive color maps from archaic Greece to the Late Roman Empire.
- Historical Atlas Wikipedia maps; no copyright
- Atlas of Germany Wikipedia maps; no copyright

== Major nations ==
- Black, Jeremy (1996). A History of the British Isles. doi:10.1007/978-1-349-24974-9. ISBN 978-1-349-24976-3.
- Carr, Raymond, ed. Spain: A history (2000)
- Clark, Christopher M. Iron kingdom: the rise and downfall of Prussia, 1600-1947 (2006)
- Davies, Norman. The Isles: A History (2001), Britain and Ireland
- Duggan, Christopher (2013). A Concise History of Italy. doi:10.1017/CBO9781139019330. ISBN 9781139019330.
- Fraser, Rebecca. The Story of Britain: From the Romans to the Present: A Narrative History (2006)
- Holborn, Hajo. vol 1: A History of Modern Germany: The Reformation; vol 2: A History of Modern Germany: 1648-1840; vol 3: A history of modern Germany: 1840–1945 (1959). a standard scholarly survey.
- Kamen, Henry. A concise history of Spain (1973)
- Helle, Knut (2003). "Introduction". The Cambridge History of Scandinavia. pp. 1–12. doi:10.1017/CHOL9780521472999.002. ISBN 9781139053570.
- Holmes, George, ed. The Oxford illustrated history of medieval Europe (2001).
- Holmes, George, ed. The Oxford illustrated history of Italy (1997)
- Jones, Colin. The Cambridge Illustrated History of France (1999)
- Kitchen, Martin The Cambridge Illustrated History of Germany (1996).
- Morgan, Kenneth O., ed. The Oxford illustrated history of Britain (1984)
- New Oxford History of England in 11 volumes (1989–2010)
- Oxford History of England in 15 volumes (1936–1965)
- Pelican History of England (1955–1965)
- Price, Roger (2013). A Concise History of France. doi:10.1017/CBO9781139084710. ISBN 9781139084710.
- Riasanovsky, Nicholas V., and Mark D. Steinberg. A History of Russia (2 vol. 2010)
- Sagarra, Eda. A social history of Germany (2003)
- Tombs, Robert, The English and their History (2014) advanced history; online review
- Wilson, Peter H. (2016). Heart of Europe. doi:10.4159/9780674915909. ISBN 9780674915909.

== Classical ==
- Boardman, John, et al. eds. The Oxford History of Greece and the Hellenistic World (2nd ed. 2002) 520 pp
- Boardman, John, et al. eds. The Oxford History of the Roman World (2001)
- Cartledge, Paul. The Cambridge Illustrated History of Ancient Greece (2002)

== Late Roman ==
- Heather, Peter. Empires and Barbarians: The Fall of Rome and the Birth of Europe (Oxford University Press; 2010); 734 pages; Examines the migrations, trade, and other phenomena that shaped a recognizable entity of Europe in the first millennium.
- Jones, A.H.M. The Later Roman Empire, 284–602: A Social, Economic, and Administrative Survey (2 Vol. 1964)
- Laiou, Angeliki E.; Morisson, Cécile (2007). The Byzantine Economy. Cambridge, England: Cambridge University Press. ISBN 978-0-521-84978-4.
- Mitchell, Stephen. A History of the Later Roman Empire, AD 284–641: The Transformation of the Ancient World (2006)

== Medieval ==
- Davis, R.H.C. A History of Medieval Europe (2nd ed. 2000)
- Ferguson, Wallace K. Europe in Transition, 1300–1520 (1962)
- Hanawalt, Barbara. The Middle Ages: An Illustrated History (1999)
- Holmes, George, ed. The Oxford Illustrated History of Medieval Europe (2001)
- Koenigsberger, H.G. Medieval Europe 400–1500 (1987)
- Riddle, John M. A history of the Middle Ages, 300–1500 (2008)

== Early modern ==
- Blanning, T. C. W. (2002). The Culture of Power and the Power of Culture. doi:10.1093/acprof:oso/9780198227458.001.0001. ISBN 9780198227458.
- Cameron, Euan. Early Modern Europe: An Oxford History (2001)
- Friedrich, Carl J. The Age of the Baroque, 1610-1660 (1962); Despite the title, this is a wide-ranging Social, cultural, political and diplomatic history of Europe; 14-day borrowing copy
- Hesmyr, Atle. Scandinavia in the Early Modern Era; From Peasant Revolts and Witch Hunts to Constitution Drafting Yeomen (2014)
- McKay, Derek (2014). The Rise of the Great Powers 1648 - 1815. doi:10.4324/9781315837093. ISBN 9781315837093.
- Rice, Eugene F. The Foundations of Early Modern Europe, 1460-1559 (2nd ed. 1994) 240 pp
- Merriman, John. A History of Modern Europe: From the Renaissance to the Present (3rd ed. 2010, 2 vol), 1412 pp online
- Scott, Hamish, ed. The Oxford Handbook of Early Modern European History, 1350–1750: Volume I: Peoples and Place (2015).
  - Scott, Hamish, ed. (2015). The Oxford Handbook of Early Modern European History, 1350-1750. doi:10.1093/oxfordhb/9780199597260.001.0001. ISBN 9780199597260.
- Stoye, John. Europe Unfolding, 1648-1688 (2nd ed. 2000).
- Te Brake, Wayne. Shaping history: Ordinary people in European politics, 1500-1700 (U of California Press, 2023).
- Treasure, Geoffrey (2003). The Making of Modern Europe, 1648-1780. doi:10.4324/9780203425985. ISBN 9780203425985.
- Wiesner, Merry E. Early Modern Europe, 1450-1789 (3rd ed. 2022)

== 19th century ==
- Anderson, M.S. The Ascendancy of Europe: 1815-1914 (3rd ed. 2003)
- Berger, Stefan, ed. A Companion to Nineteenth-Century Europe, 1789–1914 (2006), 545pp; emphasis on historiography of 32 topics; online
- Blanning, T.C.W. ed. The Nineteenth Century: Europe 1789–1914 (Short Oxford History of Europe) (2000) 320 pp
- Brinton, Crane. A Decade of Revolution, 1789–1799 (1934) online in Langer series on history of Europe.
- Bruun, Geoffrey. Europe and the French Imperium, 1799–1814 (1938) online.
- Cameron, Rondo. France and the Economic Development of Europe, 1800–1914: Conquests of Peace and Seeds of War (1961), wide-ranging economic and business history. online
- Evans, Richard J. The Pursuit of Power: Europe 1815–1914 (2016), 934 pp; scholarly survey
- Gildea, Robert. Barricades and Borders: Europe 1800–1914 (Short Oxford History of the Modern World) (3rd ed. 2003) 544 p
- Gooch, Brison D. Europe in the nineteenth century; a history (1970) online
- Grab, Alexander (2003). Napoleon and the Transformation of Europe. doi:10.1007/978-1-4039-3757-5. ISBN 978-0-333-68275-3.
- Kertesz, G.A. ed Documents in the Political History of the European Continent 1815-1939 (1968), 507 pp; several hundred short documents; primary sources
- Mason, David S. A Concise History of Modern Europe: Liberty, Equality, Solidarity (2011), since 1700
- Merriman, John, and J.M. Winter, eds. Europe 1789 to 1914: Encyclopedia of the Age of Industry and Empire (5 vol. 2006)
- Ramm, Agatha. Europe in the Nineteenth Century 1789–1905 (1984). 1950 edition online
- Richardson, Hubert N.B. A Dictionary of Napoleon and His Times (1921) online free 489 pp
- Steinberg, Jonathan. Bismarck: A Life (2011)
- Salmi, Hannu. 19th Century Europe: A Cultural History (2008).
- Taylor, A.J.P. The Struggle for Mastery in Europe 1848-1918 (1954) online free; Advanced diplomatic history online
- Thomson, David. Europe Since Napoleon (1923) 524 pp online

== Since 1900 ==
- Brose, Eric Dorn. A History of Europe in the Twentieth Century (2004) 548 pp
- Brown, Archie. The Rise and Fall of Communism (2009), global
- Buchanan, Tom. Europe's Troubled Peace: 1945 to the Present (Blackwell History of Europe) (2012)
- Cook, Bernard A. Europe Since 1945: An Encyclopedia (2 vol; 2001), 1465 pp
- Davies, Norman. Europe at War 1939-1945: No Simple Victory (2008)
- Dear, I.C.B. and M.R.D. Foot, eds. The Oxford Companion to World War II (2006)
- Frank, Matthew. Making Minorities History: Population Transfer in Twentieth-Century Europe (Oxford UP, 2017). 464 pp. online review
- Grenville, J.A.S. A History of the World in the Twentieth Century (1994). online free
- Hallock, Stephanie A. The World in the 20th Century: A Thematic Approach (2012)
- Jarausch, Konrad H. (2015). Out of Ashes. doi:10.1515/9781400865598. ISBN 9781400865598.
- Judt, Tony. Postwar: A History of Europe Since 1945 (2006)
- Martel, Gordon, ed. A Companion to Europe, 1900-1950 (2011) 32 essays by scholars; emphasis on historiography
- Mazower, Mark. Dark Continent: Europe's Twentieth Century (2000) 512 pp
- Merriman, John, and Jay Winter, eds. Europe Since 1914: Encyclopedia of the Age War and Reconstruction (5 vol. 2006)
- Payne, Stanley G. (2011). Civil War in Europe, 1905–1949. doi:10.1017/CBO9780511820465. ISBN 9780511820465.
- Paxton, Robert O., and Julie Hessler. Europe in the twentieth century (5th edition 2011.
- Pollard, Sidney, ed. Wealth and Poverty: an Economic History of the 20th Century (1990), 260 pp; global perspective online free
- Sontag, Raymond James. A broken world, 1919–1939 (1972), wide-ranging history of interwar Europe; online free to borrow
- Stone, Dan, ed. The Oxford Handbook of Postwar European History (2015).
- Ther, Philipp. Europe since 1989: A History (Princeton UP, 2016) excerpt, 440 pp
- Toynbee, Arnold, ed. Survey Of International Affairs: Hitler's Europe 1939–1946 (1954) online
- Wasserstein, Bernard. Barbarism and civilization: A history of Europe in our time (2007), since 1914 online
- Weinberg, Gerhard L. (2005). A World at Arms. doi:10.1017/CBO9780511818639. ISBN 9780511818639., on World War II

== Agriculture and economy ==
- Bakels, Corrie C. (2009). The Western European Loess Belt. doi:10.1007/978-1-4020-9840-6. ISBN 978-1-4020-9839-0.
- Berend, Iván T. An Economic History of Twentieth-Century Europe (2013)
- Berend, Ivan T. (2010). Europe. doi:10.1017/CBO9780511844867. ISBN 9780511844867. S2CID 152558617.
- Broadberry, Stephen; Orourke, Kevin H, eds. (2010). The Cambridge Economic History of Modern Europe. doi:10.1017/CBO9780511794841. ISBN 9780511794841.
- Dovring, Folke; Dovring, Karin (1965). Land and Labor in Europe in the Twentieth Century. doi:10.1007/978-94-017-6137-6. ISBN 978-94-017-5756-0.
- Gras, Norman. A history of agriculture in Europe and America (1925). online
- Kander, Astrid, et al. Power to the People: Energy in Europe Over the Last Five Centuries (Princeton UP, 2013)
- Milward, Alan S. and S.B. Saul. The Development of the Economies of Continental Europe: 1850–1914 (1977) online
- Murray, Jacqueline. The First European Agriculture (1970)
- Pollard, Sidney, ed. Wealth and Poverty: an Economic History of the 20th Century (1990), 260 pp; global perspective online free
- Pounds, N.J.G. An Economic History of Medieval Europe (1994)
- Slicher van Bath, B.H. The agrarian history of Western Europe, AD 500–1850 (1966)
- Thorp, William Long. Business Annals: United States, England, France, Germany, Austria, Russia, Sweden, Netherlands, Italy, Argentina, Brazil, Canada, South Africa, Australia, India, Japan, China (1926) capsule summary of conditions in each country for each quarter-year 1790–1925 online

== Diplomacy ==
- Albrecht-Carrié, René. A Diplomatic History of Europe Since the Congress of Vienna (1958), 736pp; a basic introduction, 1815–1955 online
- Black, Jeremy. A History of Diplomacy (2011)
- Black, Jeremy. European International Relations 1648–1815 (2002)}
- Kertesz, G.A. ed Documents in the Political History of the European Continent 1815-1939 (1968), 507 pp; several hundred short documents
- Langer, William. An Encyclopedia of World History (5th ed. 1973), very detailed outline
- Macmillan, Margaret. The War That Ended Peace: The Road to 1914 (2013) cover 1890s to 1914
- Mowat, R.B. History of European Diplomacy, 1451–1789 (1928) 324 pages
- Petrie, Charles. Earlier diplomatic history, 1492–1713 (1949), covers all of Europe; online
- Petrie, Charles. Diplomatic History, 1713–1933 (1946), broad summary online
- Schroeder, Paul. The Transformation of European Politics 1763–1848 (1994) online; advanced diplomatic history
- Sontag, Raymond James. European Diplomatic History 1871–1932 (1933) online
- Steiner, Zara. The Lights that Failed: European International History 1919–1933 (2007)
- Steiner, Zara. The Triumph of the Dark: European International History 1933–1939 (2011)
- Taylor, A.J.P The struggle for mastery in Europe, 1848–1918 (1954) online

== Empires and interactions ==
- Bayly, C.A. ed. Atlas of the British Empire (1989). survey by scholars; heavily illustrated
- Brendon, Piers. The Decline and Fall of the British Empire, 1781–1997 (2008), wide-ranging survey
- Cotterell, Arthur. Western Power in Asia: Its Slow Rise and Swift Fall, 1415 – 1999 (2009) popular history; excerpt
- D'agostino, Anthony. The Rise of Global Powers: International Politics in the Era of the World Wars (2012)
- Darwin, John. After Tamerlane: The Rise and Fall of Global Empires, 1400–2000 (2008).
- James, Lawrence. The Rise and Fall of the British Empire (1997)
- Poddar, Prem, and Lars Jensen, eds., A historical companion to postcolonial literatures: Continental Europe and Its Empires (Edinburgh UP, 2008), excerpt also entire text online
- Tolan, John; Laurens, Henry; Veinstein, Gilles; Esposito, John L. (2012). Europe and the Islamic World. doi:10.23943/princeton/9780691147055.001.0001. ISBN 9780691147055.

== Ideas and science ==
- Heilbron, John L., ed. The Oxford Companion to the History of Modern Science (2003)
- Outhwaite, William, and Tom Bottomore, eds. The Blackwell Dictionary of Twentieth-Century Social Thought (Blackwell, 1992)
- Wiener, Philip P. ed. Dictionary of the History of Ideas (5 vol 1973)

== Religion ==
- Berger, Maurits. A brief history of Islam in Europe: thirteen centuries of creed, conflict and coexistence (Leiden UP, 2014).
- Forlenza, Rosario. "New Perspectives on Twentieth-Century Catholicism." Contemporary European History 28.4 (2019): 581–595 DOI: https://doi.org/10.1017/S0960777319000146
- González, Justo L. (1985). The Story of Christianity, Vol. 2: The Reformation to the Present Day. San Francisco: Harper. ISBN 0-06-063316-6.
- Latourette, Kenneth Scott. Christianity in a Revolutionary Age: A History of Christianity in the Nineteenth and Twentieth Centuries (5 vol. 1958–69) vol 1, 2, and 4 for detailed country-by-country coverage
- MacCulloch, Diarmaid. Christianity: The First Three Thousand Years (2011)
- Vital, David. A people apart. A political history of the Jews in Europe 1789-1939 (Oxford UP, 1999) online

== Social ==
- Knepper, Paul; Johansen, Anja (2016). Knepper, Paul; Johansen, Anja (eds.). The Oxford Handbook of the History of Crime and Criminal Justice. doi:10.1093/oxfordhb/9780199352333.001.0001. ISBN 9780199352333.
- Maynes, Mary Jo. Schooling in Western Europe: A social history (1985).
- Patel, Klaus Kiran, Transnational History, EGO – European History Online, Mainz: Institute of European History, 2010, retrieved: 4 March 2020
- Sagarra, Eda (2017). A Social History of Germany 1648-1914. doi:10.4324/9781315083247. ISBN 9781315083247.
- Schmale, Wolfgang, A Transcultural History of Europe – Perspectives from the History of Migration, EGO – European History Online, Mainz: Institute of European History, 2010, retrieved: 4 March 2020
- Stearns, Peter N., ed. Encyclopedia of European Social History (6 vol 2000), 3000 pp comprehensive coverage
- Stearns, Peter N., and Herrick Chapman. European society in upheaval: social history since 1750 (1975).
- Tipton, F. and Robert Aldrich. An Economic and Social History of Europe (1987), two volumes
- Watts, Sheldon J. (2017). A Social History of Western Europe 1450–1720. doi:10.4324/9781315180793. ISBN 9781315180793. S2CID 152533804.
- Woolf, Stuart. The Poor in Western Europe in the Eighteenth and Nineteenth Centuries (Routledge, 1986)

== Warfare ==
- Archer, Christon I.; John R. Ferris, Holger H. Herwig. World History of Warfare (2002)
- Black, Jeremy. Naval Power: A History of Warfare and the Sea from 1500 onwards (2009)
- Black, Jeremy M. The Holocaust: History and Memory (2nd ed. 2024)
- Black, Jeremy. The Great War and the Making of the Modern World (2021)
- The Cambridge History of the First World War (3 vol 2014) online
- The Cambridge History of the Second World War (3 vol 2015) online
- Cruttwell, C. R. M. F. A History of the Great War, 1914–1918 (1934), general military history online free
- Dear, I.C.B.; Foot, M.R.D., eds. (2001) [1995]. The Oxford Companion to World War II. Oxford University Press. ISBN 978-0-19-860446-4.
- Dupuy, R. Ernest, The Harper Encyclopedia of Military History: From 3500 BC to the Present (1993)
- Gerwarth, Robert, and Erez Manela. "The Great War as a Global War: Imperial Conflict and the Reconfiguration of World Order, 1911–1923." Diplomatic History 38.4 (2014): 786–800. online
- Gerwarth, Robert, and Erez Manela, eds. Empires at War: 1911–1923 (2014), 12 very wide-ranging essays by scholars. excerpt
- Goldsworthy, Adrian, and John Keegan. Roman Warfare (2000)
- Gutman, Israel. Encyclopedia of the Holocaust (4 vol. 1990)
- Horne, John, ed. A Companion to World War I (2012)
- Keegan, John. A History of Warfare (1994) online
- Kennedy, Paul. The Rise and Fall of the Great Powers (1989) online
- Muehlbauer, Matthew S., and David J. Ulbrich, eds. The Routledge History of Global War and Society (Routledge, 2018)
- Paret, Peter, ed. Makers of Modern Strategy (1986), ideas of warfare
- Rapport, Mike (2013). The Napoleonic Wars. doi:10.1093/actrade/9780199590964.001.0001. ISBN 9780199590964.
- Sharman, Jason C. "Myths of military revolution: European expansion and Eurocentrism." European Journal of International Relations 24.3 (2018): 491-513 online
- Stevenson, David. Cataclysm: The First World War As Political Tragedy (2004) major reinterpretation, 560pp
- Strachan, Hew. The First World War: Volume I: To Arms (2004): a major scholarly synthesis. Thorough coverage of 1914–16; 1245pp
- Weinberg, Gerhard L. (2005). A World at Arms: A Global History of World War II (2nd ed.).; comprehensive overview with emphasis on diplomacy
- Winter, J. M. The Experience of World War I (2nd ed 2005), topical essays;
- Winter, Jay, and Antoine Prost (2nd ed 2020). The Great War in History: Debates and Controversies, 1914 to the Present. New York: Cambridge University Press. ISBN 978-0-52161-633-1
- Winter, Jay. Remembering War: The Great War Between Memory and History in the Twentieth Century. (Yale University Press, 2006)
- Winter, Jay, ed. (2014). The Cambridge History of the First World War (2 vol. Cambridge University Press, 2014)
- Zeiler, Thomas W. and Daniel M. DuBois, eds. A Companion to World War II (2 vol 2013), 1030 pp; comprehensive overview by scholars

== Women and gender ==
- Anderson, Bonnie S. and Judith P. Zinsser. A History of Their Own: Women in Europe from Prehistory to the Present (2nd ed 2000)
- Bridenthal, Renate, et al. eds. Becoming Visible: Women in European History (3rd ed. 1997), 608 pp; essays by scholars
- Frey, Linda, Marsha Frey, Joanne Schneider. Women in Western European History: A Select Chronological, Geographical, and Topical Bibliography (1982)
- Hufton, Olwen. The Prospect Before Her: A History of Women in Western Europe, 1500–1800 (1996)
- Herzog, Dagmar (2011). Sexuality in Europe. doi:10.1017/CBO9780511997075. ISBN 9780511997075.
- Offen, Karen (2010). "Surveying European Women's History since the Millenium: A Comparative Review". Journal of Women's History. 22: 154–177. doi:10.1353/jowh.0.0131. S2CID 145632281.
- Sanborn, Joshua A.; Timm, Annette F. (2016). Gender, Sex and the Shaping of Modern Europe. doi:10.5040/9781350001688. ISBN 9781350001688.
- Pal, Carol. "Women and Institutions in Early Modern Europe: Making Space for Female Scholarship." in The Routledge Handbook of Women and Early Modern European Philosophy (Routledge, 2023) pp. 13–28.
- Wiesner-Hanks, Merry E. (2019). Women and Gender in Early Modern Europe. doi:10.1017/9781108683524. ISBN 9781108683524. S2CID 165898969.

== Historiography ==
- Anderson, Benjamin, and Mirela Ivanova, eds. Is Byzantine Studies a Colonialist Discipline?: Toward a Critical Historiography (Penn State Press, 2023).
- Antonelli, Roberto. Ideas of Europe: Time, Space, and Tradition (Taylor & Francis, 2023).
- Bavaj, Riccardo: "The West": A Conceptual Exploration , European History Online, Mainz: Institute of European History, 2011,
- Berger, Stefan. “The Past and Present of European Historiography: Between Marginalization and Functionalization?” in Eurocentrism in European History and Memory, edited by Marjet Brolsma et al., (Amsterdam UP, 2019), pp. 25–42. online
- Berghahn, Volker, and Simone Lässig, eds. Biography between structure and agency: Central European lives in international historiography (Berghahn Books, 2022).
- Black, Jeremy M. The Holocaust: History and Memory (2nd ed. 2024)
- Fleming, Katherine E. "Orientalism, the Balkans, and Balkan historiography." American Historical Review 105.4 (2000): 1218–1233. online
- Geraldo, Joseph, and Michael Etnan. "Eurocentric Historiography: An Analysis of International Politics in the 21st Century and Its Effect on Changes in Historiography of Countries in Europe." International Journal of Science and Society 5.1 (2023): 1–12. online
- Haupt, Heinz-Gerhard, and Jürgen Kocka, eds. Comparative and transnational history: Central European approaches and new perspectives (Berghahn Books, 2022).
- Hroch, Miroslav. Comparative studies in modern European history: nation, nationalism, social change (Taylor & Francis, 2023) online.
- Iggers, George. New Directions in European Historiography (Wesleyan University Press, 1975)
- Mazower, Mark. "Changing Trends in the Historiography of Postwar Europe, East and West." International Labor and Working-Class History 58 (2000): 275–282. online
- Mishkova, Diana, and Balázs Trencsény, eds. European Regions and Boundaries: A Conceptual History (2017) online
- Porciana, Haria, and Lutz Raphael, eds. Atlas of European Historiography: The Making of a Profession 1800-2005 ( Palgrave Macmillan, 2010) uses 80 maps to show how historians studied Europe.
- Pincince, John. "Jerry Bentley World History, and the Decline of the 'West'" Journal of World History 25#4 (2014), pp. 631–43, online.
- Steinmetz, Willibald, Michael Freeden, and Javier Fernández-Sebastián, eds. Conceptual history in the European space (Berghahn Books, 2022).
