= Pelican History of England =

Non-fiction Penguin Books compilation published from 1950-1965

The Pelican History of England is monographic series published by the Pelican imprint of Penguin Books between 1950 and 1965. It was edited by Jack Morpurgo (1918–2000). The series ran to nine volumes and several editions.

== Series ==
"If, then, the Pelican History was a success, and much of it was, it owed little to a conscious attempt at coherence imposed from above. Coherence came rather from the common understanding of the English national past (the 'Whig' interpretation of history in the strict sense) which was diffused through all levels of the cultural community – writers, teachers, readers. What made the series so successful was, above all, the colossal commercial advantage Penguin enjoyed at the time in its virtual world monopoly of serious paperback publishing."

— Peter Ghosh, historian.

The Pelican history was originally planned to comprise eight volumes covering the period "from the Roman invasion to the outbreak of the First World War". While the overall tone was optimistic and progressive, broadly reflecting the Whig interpretation of history, the series was not doctrinaire. As Morpurgo wrote, "each author has been left to decide what he himself considers significant and interesting ... the business of discovering comparison and conclusion, and of adapting the lessons of history to our own times, is left, for the most part, to the reader."

The first three volumes were published in 1950, starting with Bindoff's Tudor England, a fourth in 1951 and three more in 1952. The last to appear was Richmond's volume on Roman Britain, which was published in 1955. A decade later it was decided to add a twentieth-century volume, written by David Thomson and initially covering the period from 1914 to 1963, later extended to 1979.

All volumes were regularly reprinted — often annually — but the amount of revision varied. The books by Bindoff and Plumb were reissued unchanged for four decades. At the other extreme, the Myers volume went through eight editions and two less extensive revisions. Penguin commissioned other historians to revise the books by Richmond and Thomson, who died in 1965 and 1970 respectively, but the "now-dated series" was reaching the end of its useful life. In 1988 Penguin appointed David Cannadine to edit a successor series, which would become the Penguin History of Britain (1996–2018).

Reprints of the Pelican volumes were now less frequent and eight of the nine titles in the final configuration of the series were reissued for the last time in 1990 or 1991. The third edition of Richmond's Roman Britain, completed by Malcolm Todd, appeared as a coda in 1995.

== Titles ==
- Roman Britain (1955), by Ian Richmond
- The Beginnings of English Society (1952), by Dorothy Whitelock
- English Society in the Early Middle Ages (1951), by Doris Mary Stenton
- England in the Late Middle Ages (1952), by A.R. Myers (1912–1980)
- Tudor England (1950), by Stanley Bindoff
- Two books have filled the seventeenth century slot in the series:
  - England in the Seventeenth Century (1952), by Maurice Ashley, which was retired in 1977
  - Stuart England (1978), by J.P. Kenyon
- England in the Eighteenth Century (1950), by J.H. Plumb
- England in the Nineteenth Century (1950), by David Thomson
- England in the Twentieth Century (1965), by David Thomson

== See also ==
- Bibliography of European history
- Oxford History of England (1936–1965)
