= Benjamin Bandoff =

English boxer (1838-1899)

Personal information
- Born: Benjamin Bindoff; 1838 Shoreditch, London, England
- Died: 1899 (aged 60) Brighton, England
- Years active: 1853–1865
- Height: 5 ft 10.5 in (179 cm) (1865)
- Weight: 10 st 12 lb (152 lb; 69 kg) (1865)

Sport
- Country: England
- Sport: Boxing
- Weight class: Super welter

Benjamin Bindoff (1838–1899), known as Benjamin Bandoff, was a 19th-century English-Jewish bare-knuckle boxer.

Bandoff's first match was on 20 September 1853, having been matched against Jerry Duggan for £10 a side. The battle, which continued for 75 rounds, was interrupted by the approach of darkness, and the match was drawn. Bandoff next fought George Sims, and was beaten by him on 8 November 1854 and on 17 May 1858. Four years later, however, Bandoff retrieved his reputation as a fighter when he met and defeated Hopkinson after a battle of 28 rounds (9 April 1862). This victory was followed by another on 8 September 1863, when Bandoff defeated Australian boxer Frederick "Black Billy" Jackson at Home Circuit after 40 rounds. On the same spot he fought 86 rounds with Callaghan; but owing to darkness the match terminated in a draw. Bandoff's last appearance in the prize-ring was at Thames Haven on 14 February 1865, when he was beaten by Jack Smith, the "Brighton Doctor," after a contest of 16 rounds. He worked as a leather merchant in Brighton, where he died in 1899.

His grandson was historian Stanley Bindoff.
