= An Economic and Social History of Europe =

Two-volume history book

- Author: Robert Aldrich and Frank Tipton
- Language: English
- Subject: history of Europe
- Publisher: Johns Hopkins University Press
- Publication date: 1987
- Media type: Print
- Pages: 323 pp. (vol 1), 297 pp. (vol 2)
- ISBN: 978-0-333-36807-7

An Economic and Social History of Europe is a two-volume book by Robert Aldrich and Frank Tipton. The first volume deals with the period 1890-1939 and the second from 1939 to the present.

== Reception ==
The book has been reviewed by Robert R. Locke, Theodore H. Von Laue, Alan Milward and Paul B. Huber.
