= Robert Ensor =

British historian and poet

Sir Robert Ensor
- Born: 16 October 1877; Milborne Port
- Died: 4 December 1958 (aged 81); Beaconsfield
- Occupation: Historian
- Spouse: Helen Fisher (m. 1906)
- Children: 5

Academic background
- Education: Winchester College
- Alma mater: Balliol College, Oxford

Academic work
- Institutions: Corpus Christi College, Oxford; London School of Economics; All Souls College, Oxford; Nuffield College, Oxford

Sir Robert Charles Kirkwood Ensor (16 October 1877 – 4 December 1958) was a British writer, poet, journalist, liberal intellectual, and historian. He is best known for England: 1870-1914 (1936), a volume in the Oxford History of England series edited by George Clark.

== Biography ==
Born in Milborne Port, Dorset, he was the son of Robert H Ensor and his wife Olivia née Currie. He was educated at Winchester and Balliol College, Oxford where he achieved a first in Greats and also the Chancellor's Latin verse prize. He was President of the Oxford Union in 1900. He became involved in left-wing politics, publishing a selection of writings of leading socialist theorists as Modern Socialism in 1903. He failed at his attempts to become a fellow of Merton, St John's and All Souls (twice) but later became a tutor at Corpus Christi College, Oxford.

In 1902 he became leader writer for The Manchester Guardian. In 1905 he moved to London where he was called to the bar at the Inner Temple. From 1909 - 1911 he worked for the Daily News and from 1912 - 1930 for the Daily Chronicle. Ensor lived in Poplar, and from 1910 - 1913 represented the area on the London County Council as a Labour Party councillor.

Following the closure of the Daily Chronicle in 1930, he retired from regular journalistic work, although he continued to contribute to various publications as an editor and reviewer. In 1931 he took up a post as a lecturer in the London School of Economics, but a year later returned to Oxford where he acted as deputy to Arthur Salter, Gladstone Professor of Political Theory and Institutions.

George Clark commissioned him a volume of the Oxford History of England, covering the years 1870 to 1914. Reviewer Richard Hammond noted that he devoted six of his fifteen chapters to 'Economics and Institutions' and 'Mental and Social Aspects', and "these are both well-informed and up-to-date." Published in 1936 as the final volume, Ensor's book has sold more copies than any other in the original fourteen part series. He was subsequently made a research fellow of Corpus Christi College and a research lecturer of All Souls College in 1937 and a faculty fellow of Nuffield College in 1938.

He was commissioned in 1937 to write a sequel to his volume of the Oxford History of England but he resumed his journalism during the Second World War with a weekly column on foreign affairs in the Sunday Times. The book, a volume covering the years 1914 to 1945, was eventually written by A.J.P. Taylor.

== Personal life ==
Ensor married Helen Fisher of Manchester in 1906, and the couple had two sons and three daughters. The family made their home at Upper Sands, near High Wycombe, Buckinghamshire. He retired in 1953 and was knighted in 1955. Ensor was teetotal and a vegetarian.

He died in a Beaconsfield nursing home in December 1958, aged 81.

Party political offices
| Preceded by Margaret McMillan | London Division representative on the Independent Labour Party National Administrative Council; 1909–1910 | Succeeded by Harry Snell |
