= Victorious Century =

2017 book by David Cannadine

Victorious Century: The United Kingdom, 1800–1906
- First edition
- Author: Sir David Cannadine
- Language: English
- Series: Penguin History of Britain
- Genre: History
- Publisher: Allen Lane
- Publication date: 2017
- Publication place: United Kingdom
- Pages: 624
- ISBN: 978-0525557890
- Preceded by: Linda Colley, A Wealth of Nations? Britain, 1707-1815 (2017)

Victorious Century: The United Kingdom, 1800–1906 is a book by David Cannadine, the Dodge Professor of History at Princeton University and President of the British Academy. The book is about the Victorian era in nineteenth-century Britain. It begins with the Act of Union in 1800 and ends with the Parliamentary victory of the Liberal Party in 1906. Cannadine opens with the Charles Dickens' quote, "It was the best of times, it was the worst of times." He argues that Britain maintained its status as leader of the global economy and possessor of the largest navy in the world. At the same time, the country was plagued by internal problems and social conflicts. According to the Whig Interpretation of history, the "victorious century" represented a time of expanding democracy and wave of acts of Parliament providing political reform and universal manhood suffrage. Cannadine argues,

"This was a country which saw itself at the summit of the world. And yet it was a society also convulsed by doubt, fear and introspection. Repeatedly, politicians and writers felt themselves to be staring into the abyss and what is seen as an era of irritating self-belief was in practice obsessed by a sense of its own fragility, whether as a great power or as a moral force. Victorious Century catches the relish and humour of the age, but also the dilemmas of a kind with which we remain familiar today."

== Summary ==
Cannadine begins with the Act of Union with Ireland, identifying the year 1800 as the beginning of Britain's victory over France and attainment of global hegemony. Waves of political reform manifest themselves through the Reform Act 1832 (2 & 3 Will. 4. c. 45), the Chartist movement, and the Reform Act 1867. Queen Victoria's ascendance to the throne in 1837 marks a new era for Britain, one where active enthusiasm and drive for global empire becomes a popular ideal. Cannadine also analyzes the key statesmen of the Victorian era: William Pitt, Robert Peel, Viscount Palmerston, William Gladstone, Benjamin Disraeli, and more. He also views The Great Exhibition in 1851 as a milestone in British cultural and imperial history. The book analyzes Victoria's Diamond Jubilee and concludes with the Liberal victory in Parliament in 1906.

== Critical response ==
Victorious Century has been commended for its new perspective on nineteenth-century British politics, economy, and imperial ambitions. Professor Maya Jasanoff of Harvard University offers considerable praise for the book, stating that Cannadine has "pulled off the hat-trick of commanding erudition, original interpretation and graceful writing." Professor Jane Ridley of the University of Buckingham asserts that "Only a historian at the very top of his game can do that and get away with it, and Cannadine succeeds triumphantly." Professor Paul Kennedy of Yale University also remarks that the book is "an admirably readable guide to the British history of the long 19th century." Reviews in The New York Times and the Wall Street Journal have also lauded the book as an admirable endeavor.

The book has also received criticism, notably from Professor Richard J. Evans of Gresham College in London. In his review, he claims that Cannadine "says hardly anything in detail about the economic problems and social inequalities that beset Georgian and Victorian Britain" and asserts that "the book is not an easy read."

The Editors' Choice section of The New York Times featured Victorious Century as a recommended book in 2018.

== See also ==
- Imperialism
- British Empire
- Queen Victoria
- Historiography of the United Kingdom
