= Robert Locke =

Robert Locke may refer to:

- Rob Locke (born 1971), British actor
- Robert H. Locke aka Clayton Bess (1944–2020), writer and playwright
- Robert R. Locke (born 1932), American historian and management expert
- Bobby Locke (1917–1987), golfer
- Bobby Locke (baseball) (1934–2020), baseball player

== See also ==
- Robert Lock (disambiguation)
