= Penguin History of Britain =

Book series

The Penguin History of Britain is a series of books on British history for the general reader published by Penguin Books. Eight of the nine volumes appeared between 1996 and 2018, with several of them going on to be reissued in revised editions. The general editor is David Cannadine, who also contributed the nineteenth-century volume. Still to come is Linda Colley's volume on the eighteenth century. This was announced when the series was launched in 1996, and as of mid-2026 it was expected to appear in 2028.

Collectively, the books in the series span the period 54 BC to 2000. They are:

1. An Imperial Possession: Britain in the Roman Empire, 54 BC–AD 409 (2006) by David Mattingly
2. Britain After Rome: The Fall and Rise, 400 to 1070 (2010) by Robin Fleming
3. The Struggle for Mastery: Britain, 1066–1284 (2003) by David Carpenter
4. The Hollow Crown: A History of Britain in the Late Middle Ages (2005) by Miri Rubin
5. New Worlds, Lost Worlds: The Rule of the Tudors, 1485–1603 (2000) by Susan Brigden
6. A Monarchy Transformed: Britain, 1603–1714 (1996) by Mark Kishlansky
7. Becoming Global: Britain, 1688–1815 by Linda Colley — expected 18 May 2028
8. Victorious Century: The United Kingdom, 1800-1906 (2018) by David Cannadine
9. Hope and Glory: Britain 1900–1990 (1996) by Peter Clarke — the second edition published in 2004 took the story to 2000

The series is primarily envisaged as a narrative history of Britain, intended to update the "Whiggish" approach of older studies. It was particularly intended to supersede the Pelican History of England (1950–1965) which, though influential, was considered "dated". The series was intended to engage with "the fact of decline, political, imperial, military and economic" in British power. It was framed as "consciously British" (rather than English) and put particular "focus on Britain’s world position primarily with reference to the 'three circles' of Europe, the Empire and the United States".

== See also ==
- New Oxford History of England (1989—)
