= Pelican Books =

British publishing company

- Parent company: Penguin Random House
- Founded: 1937
- Founders: Allen Lane; V. K. Krishna Menon
- Country of origin: United Kingdom
- Headquarters location: London
- Publication types: Books
- Official website: pelicanbooks.com

Pelican Books is a non-fiction imprint of Penguin Books founded by Allen Lane and V. K. Krishna Menon. It publishes inexpensive paperbacks of academic topics intended to reach a broader audience. The imprint originally operated from 1937 to 1984, and was relaunched in April 2014.

== Pelican Books, 1937–1984 ==
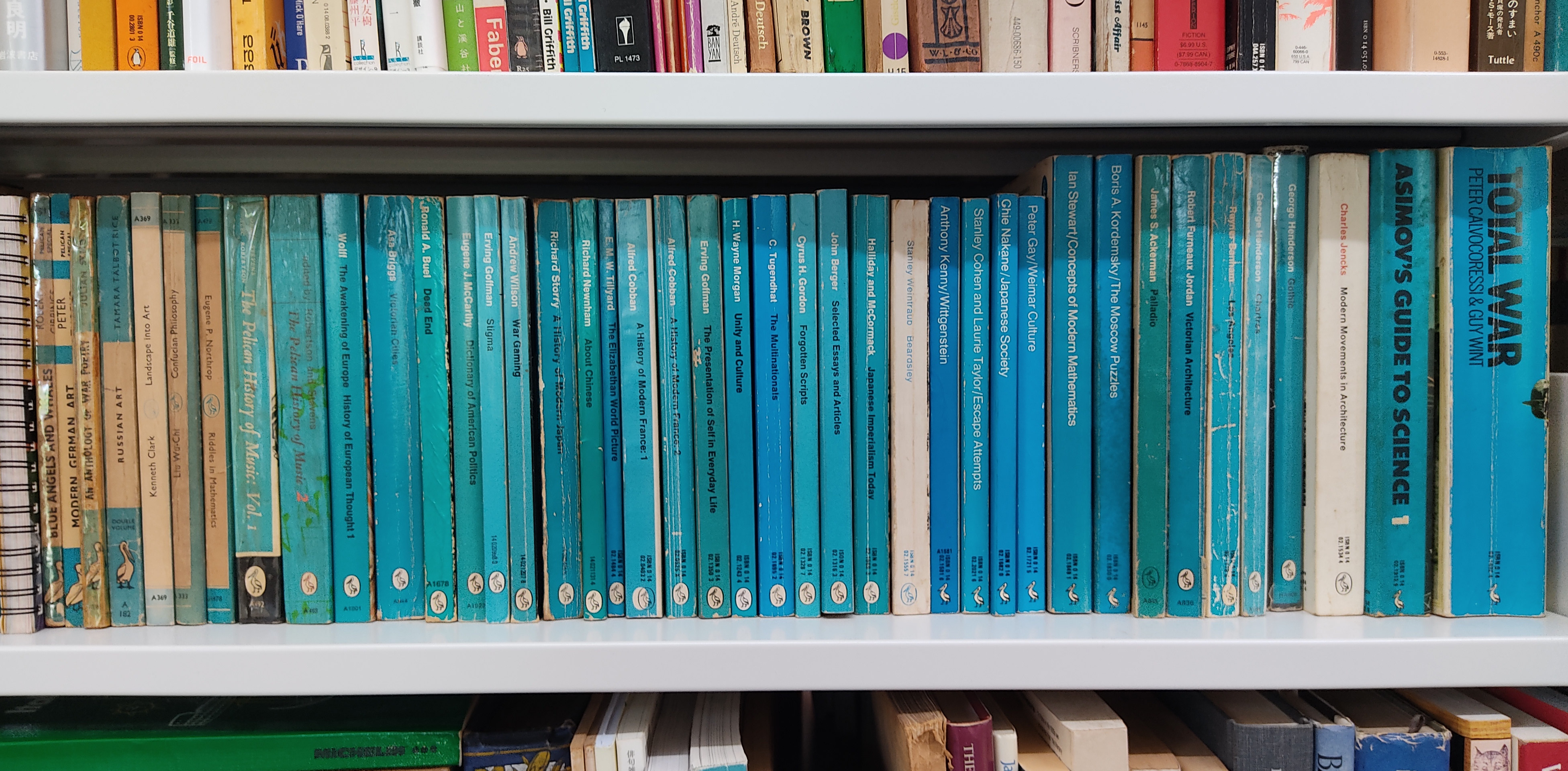
Spines of miscellaneous Pelican books. Smaller-format (11.2×18.1 mm) Pelicans are very roughly arranged in chronological order; they include two "Pelican Specials". Among the larger-format (13×20 mm) Pelicans is a hardback (George Henderson's Gothic). (At 16.3×23.6 mm, Philip J. Davis and Reuben Hersh's The Mathematical Experience was too large to fit this shelf.)

Pelican Books was established in 1937 as a non-fiction imprint for low-cost intellectual paperbacks. Co-founder Allen Lane wrote, ‘We… believed in the existence in this country of a vast reading public for intelligent books at a low price, and staked everything on it.’ Pelican lowered the traditional barriers to knowledge by selling books at the cost of a packet of cigarettes. In 1938, The Spectator reported, 'If there is any sense in saying that the culture of the world should be accessible to all without distinctions of wealth, such publications are helping to make it true.' These books became especially popular among the self-educating post-war generation, and Pelican was even called an ‘informal university for '50s Britons’ by The Guardian.

For their first few decades, each regular Pelican was given a number starting "A". "A1" and "A2" were the two volumes of George Bernard Shaw’s newly augmented The Intelligent Woman's Guide to Socialism, Capitalism, Sovietism and Fascism; however, these were just two of nine volumes published in May 1937, the others being Olaf Stapledon, Last and First Men (the only work of fiction published under Pelican); Leonard Woolley, Digging up the Past; H. G. Wells, A Short History of the World (previously published as a Penguin); G. D. H. Cole, Practical Economics; Julian Huxley, Essays in Popular Science; Bonamy Dobrée and G. E. Manwaring, The Floating Republic; Élie Halévy, A History of the English People in 1815, vol. 1.

Pelican published many of the major intellects of the 20th century including historian Eric Hobsbawm, literary critic Boris Ford, philosopher A. J. Ayer, and journalist Jacob Bronowski. Other classic Pelican books included Totem and Taboo, The Eighteen Nineties, An Introduction to Modern Architecture, Coming of Age in Samoa, Pelican History of England, The Pelican Guide to English Literature, and Childhood in Society. Pelican’s early supporters included George Orwell, H. G. Wells, George Bernard Shaw, and J. B. Priestley.

The imprint published books on thousands of subjects and became a global phenomenon. The series sold over 250 million copies worldwide over its nearly 50 years. Although Pelican was discontinued in 1984, the original books continue to be collected worldwide and prized for their iconic bright blue covers.

=== Pelican Specials ===
From 1938 to 1940, a few books within the series Penguin Specials (and thus given numbers starting with "S") were given blue covers and labelled as Pelican Specials. The first was Arnold Haskell, Ballet (S5, July 1938; in 1945 reissued as a Pelican, A122).

== Pelican History of Art ==
The hardback series the Pelican History of Art started publication in May 1953, with Painting in Britain: 1530–1790 by Ellis K. Waterhouse. Books in the series were given a number starting with "Z". The series was eventually turned over to Yale University Press.

== Relaunch ==
Pelican Books was relaunched in May 2014, again aiming to provide inexpensive, accessible non-fiction for a non-specialist readership. The first five books consisted of introductions to topics varying from economics to revolutionary Russia, written by authorities selected by the company. These were published in May 2014, with five more titles to be added each year.

The first five books were:

Economics: The User’s Guide by Ha-Joon Chang
The author was, at the time of publication, Reader in the Political Economy of Development at the University of Cambridge.
Human Evolution by Robin Dunbar
An overview of human evolution, and especially the social and cognitive changes that gave rise to modern humans, by a British anthropologist and evolutionary psychologist.
Revolutionary Russia by Orlando Figes
A short book on a period of Russian history, by a professor of History at Birkbeck College.
The Domesticated Brain by Bruce Hood
An examination of the intersection between neuroscience and psychology, from a British experimental psychologist.
Greek and Roman Political Ideas by Melissa Lane
An introduction to political philosophy in Ancient Greece and Rome, by a professor of politics from Princeton University.

The re-launch also included a line of Pelican t-shirts. These were made in collaboration with independent London clothing brand, Super Superficial, who sold them in their store and online.
