= Oxford History of England =

Book series by Oxford University Press

The Oxford History of England (1934–1965) is a series of books on the history of the United Kingdom. Published by Oxford University Press, it was originally intended to span from Roman Britain to the outbreak of the First World War in fourteen volumes written by eminent historians. The volume on the Stuarts by series editor Sir George Clark was the first to be published, appearing in 1934. The series as originally conceived was completed in 1961, with a fifteenth volume taking the narrative up to the end of the Second World War added in 1965.

All of the volumes published before 1945 except Ensor's were revised, and in one case replaced, in the postwar years. In the 1980s the first volume — a composite with sections on the Roman period and the English settlements written independently by Collingwood and Myres respectively — was split in two, with a new treatment of Roman Britain by Peter Salway and with Myres rewriting his history of the transitional period between the Romans and the Anglo-Saxons from scratch. This reorganisation aside, the last regular revision was to Stenton's history of the Anglo-Saxons in 1971. Despite their age, most volumes remained in print as of 2026.

Some volumes are considered classic works for their respective periods. The reputation of the series as a whole, however, is mixed. John Bossy wrote in 1996 that it "does not much ring in the mind" except for volumes 1, 2 and 15 (by Collingwood, Stenton and Taylor). Patrick Wormald in 1981 similarly praised the same volumes (and "perhaps" volume 12 by Watson) as "among the successes of a not entirely happy series".

== Volumes and authors ==
This is a list of the volumes in the series, with the date of first publication followed by the dates of revised editions, if any.

- Volume I: Roman Britain and the English Settlements – R. G. Collingwood and J. N. L. Myres (1936, 1937)
  - Later replaced by:

Volume I A: Roman Britain — Peter Salway (1981)
Volume I B: The English Settlements — J. N. L. Myres (1986)

- Volume II: Anglo-Saxon England, c550–1087 — Sir Frank Stenton (1943, 1947, 1971)
- Volume III: From Domesday Book to Magna Carta, 1087–1216 — Austin L. Poole (1951, 1955)
- Volume IV: The Thirteenth Century, 1216–1307 — Sir Maurice Powicke (1953, 1962)
- Volume V: The Fourteenth Century, 1307–1399 — May McKisack (1959)
- Volume VI: The Fifteenth Century, 1399–1485 — E. F. Jacob (1961)
- Volume VII: The Earlier Tudors, 1485–1558 — J. D. Mackie (1952)
- Volume VIII: The Reign of Elizabeth, 1558–1603 — J. B. Black (1936, 1959)
- Volume IX: The Early Stuarts, 1603–1660 — Godfrey Davies (1937, 1959)
- Volume X: The Later Stuarts, 1660–1714 — Sir George Clark (1934, 1956)
- Volume XI: The Whig Supremacy, 1714–1760 — Basil Williams (1939)
  - 2nd edition revised by C. H. Stuart (1962)
- Volume XII: The Reign of George III, 1760–1815 — J. Steven Watson (1960)
- Volume XIII: The Age of Reform, 1815–1870 — Sir Llewellyn Woodward (1938, 1962)
- Volume XIV: England, 1870–1914 — Sir Robert Ensor (1936)
- Volume XV: English History, 1914–1945 — A. J. P. Taylor (1965)

A Consolidated Index was added as a separate volume in 1991.

== Use of the term England ==
When the series was commissioned:

"England" was still an all-embracing word. It meant indiscriminately England and Wales; Great Britain; the United Kingdom; and even the British Empire. (A. J. P. Taylor, Volume XV: English History, 1914–1945, page v)

Since then there has been a trend in history to restrict the use of the term England to the state that existed pre-1707 and to the geographic area it covered and people it contained in the period thereafter, but without Wales. The different authors interpreted "English history" differently, with Taylor opting to write the history of the British people, including the people of Wales, Scotland, Ireland, Empire and Commonwealth where they shared a history with England, but ignoring them where they did not. Other authors opted to treat non-English matters within their remit.

== New Oxford History of England ==
A New Oxford History of England was commissioned in 1992 and produced eleven volumes by 2010. At least six volumes were still forthcoming, as of 2025. The following chart compares the two series.

== See also ==
- Bibliography of European history
- Pelican History of England (1955–1965)
