= Maurice Ashley (historian) =

British historian

Maurice Percy Ashley
- Born: 4 September 1907
- Died: 26 September 1994 (aged 87)
- Education: St Paul's School and New College, Oxford
- Occupation(s): Historian, journalist and editor

Maurice Percy Ashley CBE (4 September 1907 – 26 September 1994) was a British historian of the 17th Century and editor of The Listener. He published over thirty books, of which his Financial and Commercial Policy Under the Cromwellian Protectorate (1934) achieved wide academic influence, while his biographies Cromwell (1937) and General Monck (1977) received particular praise.

== Background and education ==
Ashley was educated at St Paul's School and New College, Oxford, where he won the Stanhope Essay Prize (1928, 'Republicanism in the reign of Charles II') and the Gladstone Memorial (1930, 'The rise of Latitudinarianism in the Church of England'), and achieved first-class honours in Modern History in 1929. He went on to take a DPhil, studying under David Ogg, and it was his doctoral thesis that became Financial and Commercial Policy Under the Cromwellian Protectorate. Ashley's father worked as an official at the Board of Trade.

== Career ==
In 1929 he was appointed literary assistant to Winston Churchill, who had just begun work on his biography Marlborough: His Life and Times. Ashley provided Churchill with original material from archives in Britain and Europe, earning £300 a year for this half-time employment. Although he was unimpressed by Ashley's socialistic views, Churchill praised his "competence and industry as an historical investigator". Ashley later wrote Churchill as Historian (1968), a perceptive analysis of Churchill's methods.

Ashley's career as a journalist began when he joined the staff of the Manchester Guardian as a leader writer in 1933, moving to The Times in 1937 as a foreign sub-editor. He continued to write, publishing Oliver Cromwell: the Conservative Dictator in 1937 and his own short book on Marlborough in 1939. He was briefly editor of Britain Today in 1939-40 but in 1940 enlisted in the Grenadier Guards, later being transferred to the Intelligence Corps. By 1945 he had achieved the rank of major.

After World War II, he joined the BBC's weekly publication, The Listener, as Deputy Editor and was appointed Editor in 1958, in which job he remained until retiring in 1967. He broadened the range of the journal, which had been a vehicle for the text of selected broadcasts and criticism of radio and then television programmes. Under Ashley, The Listener's book reviews played a leading role in killing off the 19th-century tradition of anonymous reviewing.

Among a number of books, Ashley's publications in this period included his The Greatness of Oliver Cromwell (1957), a substantial revision of his earlier view of Cromwell, and The Glorious Revolution of 1688 (1966). After retiring from The Listener, the rate of his publications increased, helped by a two-year research fellowship at Loughborough University. This period saw the publication of his studies of Charles II, James II, Prince Rupert, and his General Monck (1977), regarded as one of his best books. His last book, The Battle of Naseby and the Fall of King Charles I (1992), appeared when he was 85.

He died on 26 September 1994 and was buried in a family grave in Highgate Cemetery.

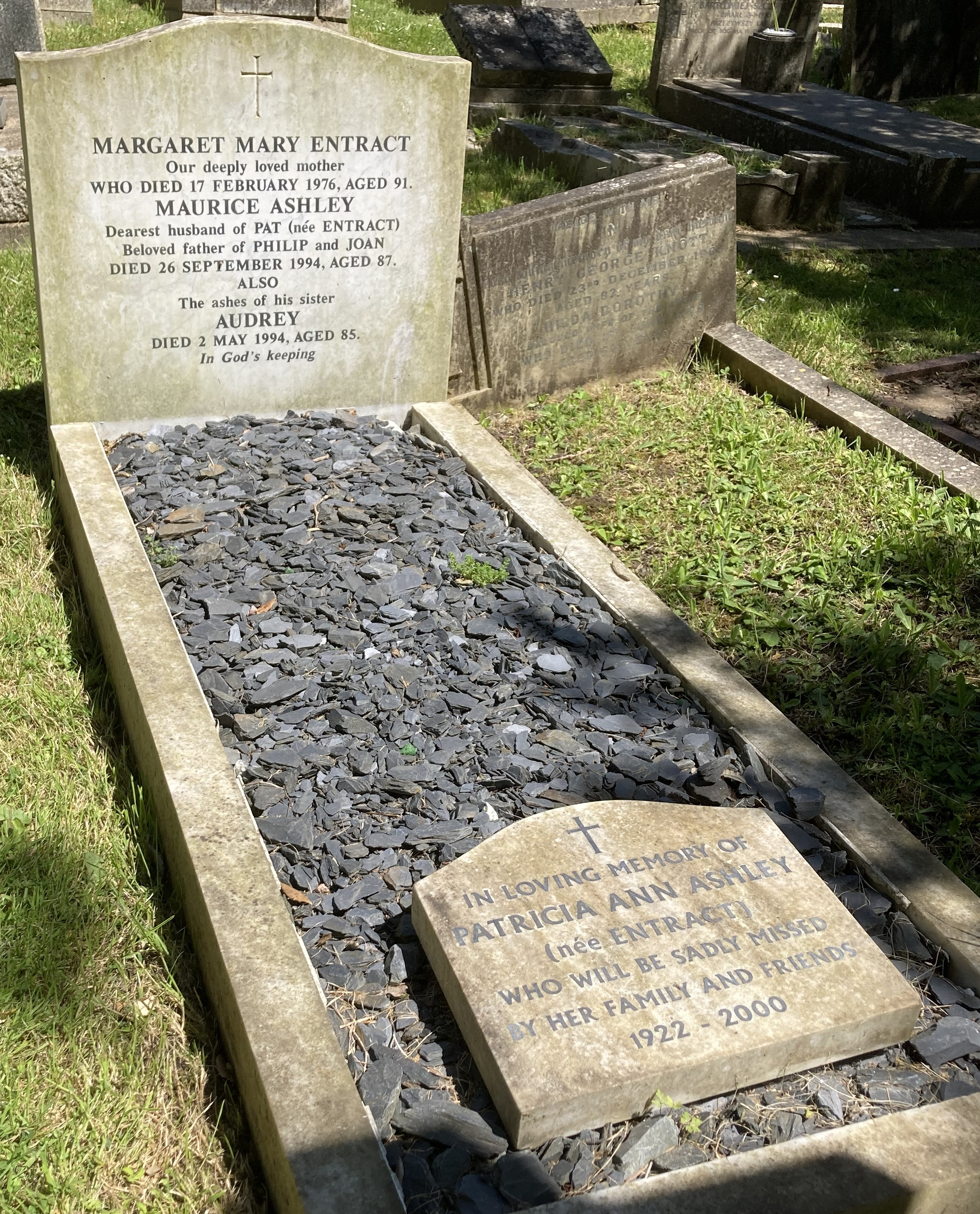
Grave of Maurice Ashley in Highgate Cemetery

== Awards ==
Ashley was awarded a CBE in 1978 and a DLitt from Oxford in 1979. He was President of the Cromwell Association from 1961 to 1977.

== Personal life ==
He married twice, first in 1935 to Phyllis Mary Griffiths, with whom he had a son and a daughter, and second in 1988 to Patricia Entract.

== Selected works ==
- Financial and Commercial Policy Under the Cromwellian Protectorate (1934)
- Oliver Cromwell: the Conservative Dictator (1937)
- Marlborough (1939) (Duckworth Great Lives)
- Louis XIV and the Greatness of France (1946) (Teach Yourself History/Men and Their Times)
- John Wildman: Plotter and Postmaster (1947)
- Mr. President: An Introduction to American History (1948)
- England in the Seventeenth Century (1952) (vol. 6 in the Pelican History of England)
- Cromwell's Generals (1954)
- The Greatness of Oliver Cromwell (1957)
- Great Britain to 1688: A Modern History (1961)
- The Stuarts in Love (1963)
- Magna Carta in the Seventeenth Century (1965)
- Oliver Cromwell and the Puritan Revolution (1966) (Teach Yourself History/Men and Their Times)
- The Glorious Revolution of 1688 (1966)
- Life in Stuart England (1967) (Batsford English Life)
- Churchill as Historian (1968)
- The Golden Century: Europe 1598-1715 (1969) (History of Civilization)
- Charles II: The Man and the Statesman (1971)
- The Life and Times of King John (1972) (Kings and Queens of England)
- Oliver Cromwell and His World (1972) (Thames and Hudson series)
- The Life and Times of William I (1973) (Kings and Queens of England)
- The English Civil War: A Concise History (1974)
- The Age of Absolutism, 1648-1775 (1974) (History of the Western World)
- Rupert of the Rhine (1976)
- General Monck (1977)
- James II (1978)
- The House of Stuart: Its Rise and Fall (1980)
- The People of England: A Short Social and Economic History (1982)
- Charles I and Oliver Cromwell: A Study in Contrasts and Comparisons (1987)
- The Battle of Naseby and the Fall of King Charles I (1992)
