= Julian Hoppit =

Julian Hoppit FBA (born 1957) is a British historian, specializing in the early modern economic and political history of Britain.

He was Astor Professor of British History at University College London from 2006 to 2021 and in 2012 was elected a Fellow of the British Academy.

== Early life ==
Hoppit was educated at Selwyn College, Cambridge, where he was taught by John Morrill, and later at Pembroke and Magdalene Colleges, where he graduated Ph.D. His thesis was later developed as Risk and Failure in English business, 1700–1800, published by the Cambridge University Press in 1987.

== Career ==
In 1987, Hoppit became a lecturer at University College London. In 1992, he succeeded his former tutor John Morrill as general editor of the Royal Historical Society's Bibliography of British and Irish History.

In 2006, he was appointed as Astor Professor of British History at University College London. After retiring from this chair in 2021, he was made an emeritus professor. He is also a Fellow of the Royal Historical Society and a board member of the History of Parliament.

In a Journal of Modern History review of his Britain’s Political Economies (2017), Hoppit was called "one of this generation's most important writers on early modern British economic life and institutions".

From 2010 to 2015, Hoppit was a director of Watford Grammar School for Boys.

== Personal life ==
In 1984, in Cambridge, Hoppit married Dr Karin Joan Horowitz, an American.

== Selected publications ==
- "Financial Crises in Eighteenth-century England", The Economic History Review (February 1986)
- Risk and Failure in English business, 1700–1800 (Cambridge University Press, 1987), with Philip Mirowski
- "Income, Welfare and the Industrial Revolution in Britain" The Historical Journal 31 (03) (September 1988)
- "Counting the Industrial Revolution", The Economic History Review 43(2) (May 1990), 173–193
- "Attitudes to Credit in Britain, 1680–1790", The Historical Journal 33 (June 1990), 305–322
- "Economic Growth in the Age of Reason", Historical Journal 34 (September 1991)
- "Reforming Britain's Weights and Measures, 1660–1824", English Historical Review (1993), 82–104
- "Patterns of parliamentary legislation, 1660–1800", The Historical Journal 39 (March 1996)
- Failed legislation, 1660–1800, extracted from the Commons and Lords Journals (Hambledon Press, 1997)
- A Land of Liberty? England, 1689–1727 (Oxford: Clarendon Press, New Oxford History of England, 2000)
- "The Myths of the South Sea Bubble", Transactions of the Royal Historical Society 12 (2002), 141–165
- "The Nation, the State, and the First Industrial Revolution," Journal of British Studies 50 No. 2 (April 2011), 307–331
- Nehemiah Grew and England's Economic Development: The Means of a Most Ample Increase of the Wealth and Strength of England (1706-7) (Oxford University Press / British Academy, 2012)
- Parliaments, Nations and Identities in Britain and Ireland, 1660–1850 (Manchester University Press, 2013)
- Britain’s Political Economies: parliament and economic life, 1660–1800 (Cambridge University Press, 2017)
- Money and Markets: Essays in Honour of Martin Daunton, ed. with Adrian Leonard, Duncan Needham (Boydell Press, 2019) ISBN 9781783274451
- The Dreadful Monster and its Poor Relations: Taxing, Spending and the United Kingdom, 1707–2021 (Penguin Books, 2021)
