= Robert Lock =

Robert Lock may refer to:

- Robert Lock (British Army officer) (1879–1957), British general in the Royal Artillery
- Robert Heath Lock (1879–1915), English botanist
- Bob Lock (born 1949), Welsh writer
- Rob Lock (born 1966), basketball player
- Robert Lock (ski jumper), British Ski Jumper; see List of national ski-jumping records
- Robert Lock, co-defendant with Sandra Gregory in a 1993 Thai drugs case
- Robert Lock, of Lock, Hulme & Co.

== See also ==
- Robert Locke (disambiguation)
