= Miri Rubin =

British historian (born 1956)

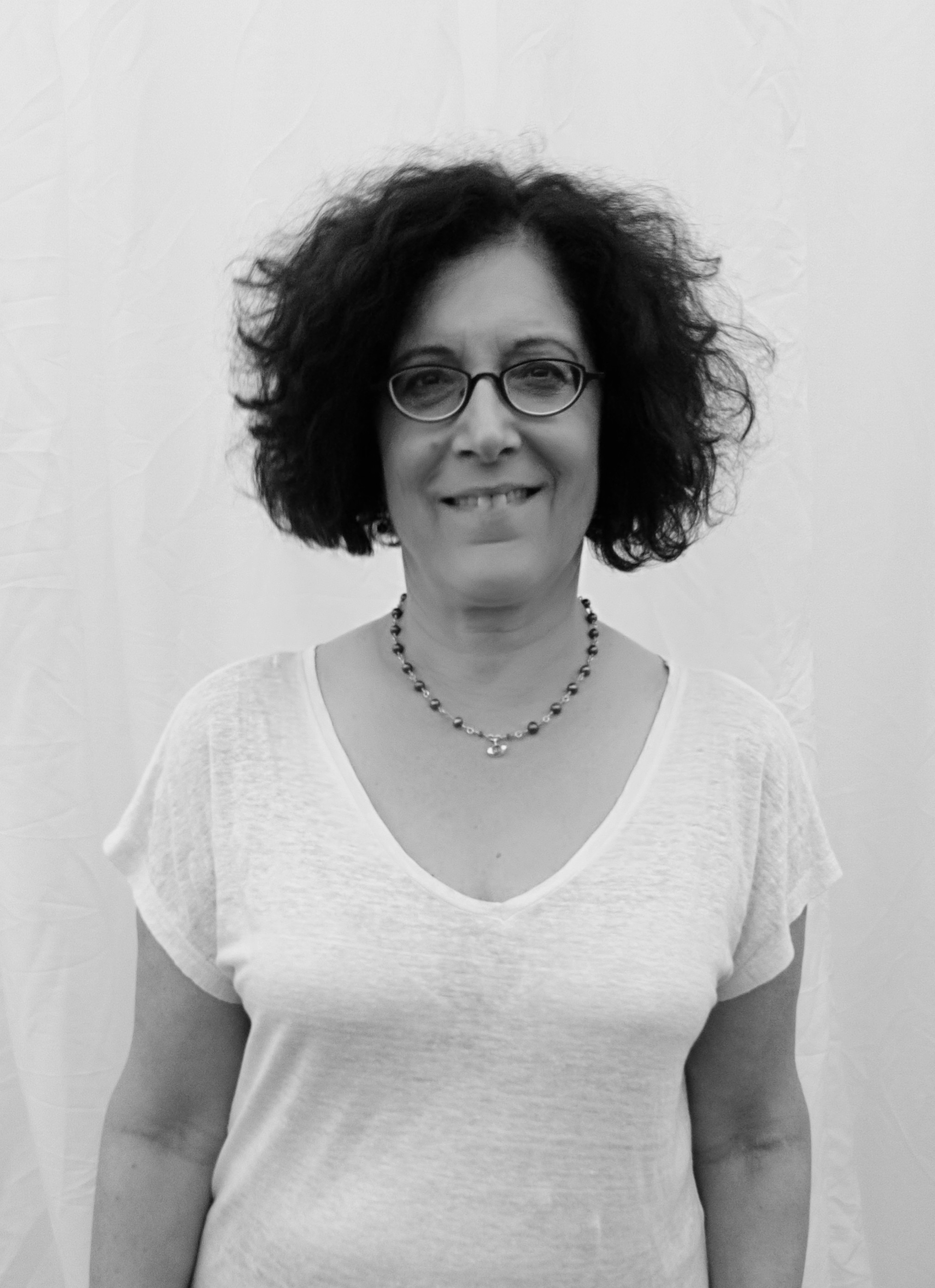
Professor Miri Rubin

Miri Rubin (Hebrew: מירי רובין; born 1956) is a historian and professor of medieval and early modern history at Queen Mary University of London. She was educated at the Hebrew University of Jerusalem and the University of Cambridge, where she gained her doctorate and was later awarded a research fellowship and a post-doctoral research fellowship at Girton College. Between 1989 and 2000 she held a tutorial fellowship at Pembroke College, Oxford and a university lectureship, then readership, in the Faculty of History. Rubin studies the social and religious history of Europe between 1100 and 1500, concentrating on the interactions between public rituals, power, and community life.

In 2012 she gave a Turku Agora Lecture. In 2017 she gave the Wiles Lectures at Queen's University Belfast. In 2024, she delivered the Gifford Lectures on The Feminine and the Religious Imagination at the University of Aberdeen.

Her books have been well received in newspapers and academic journals. The Guardian calls her Hollow Crown "a magnificent history of the late Middle Ages". The TLS reviews her Cities of Strangers as a "thoughtful and pioneering book".

Between 2020 - 2025, Rubin served as president of the Jewish Historical Society of England. She is a Fellow of the Royal Historical Society.

== Bibliography ==
- Charity and community in Medieval Cambridge. Cambridge: Cambridge University Press. 1987. ISBN 9780521893985
- Corpus Christi: The Eucharist in Late Medieval Culture (Cambridge: Cambridge University Press, 1991), ISBN 0-521-35605-9
- Church and City, 1000-1500: Essays in Honour of Christopher Brooke (Cambridge: Cambridge University Press, 1992), ISBN 0-521-35611-3, ed. with David Abulafia and Michael Franklin
- Framing Medieval Bodies (Manchester: Manchester University Press, 1994), ISBN 0-7190-3615-1, ed. with Sarah Kay
- The Work of Jacques Le Goff and the Challenges of Medieval History (Woodbridge: Boydell Press, 1997), ISBN 0-85115-622-3
- Gentile Tales: The Narrative Assault on Late Medieval Jews (New Haven: Yale University Press, 1999), ISBN 0-300-07612-6
- The Hollow Crown: A History of Britain in the Late Middle Ages (London: Allen Lane, 2005), ISBN 0-7139-9066-X (vol. 4 in the Penguin History of Britain series)
- Love, Friendship and Faith in Europe, 1300-1800 (Houndmills: Palgrave Macmillan, 2005), ISBN 1-4039-9147-2, ed. with Laura Gowing and Michael Hunter
- The Cambridge History of Christianity. Vol. 4: Christianity in Western Europe, c. 1100–c.1500 (Cambridge University Press, 2009) ISBN 978-1-139-05602-1, ed. with Walter Simons
- editor, European Religious Cultures: Essays Offered to Christopher Brooke on the Occasion of His Eightieth Birthday (Institute of Historical Research) ISBN 9781905165407
- Mother of God: A History of the Virgin Mary (Allen Lane, 2009), ISBN 0-7139-9818-0
- The Middle Ages: A Very Short Introduction (Oxford: Oxford University Press, 2014) ISBN 9780199697298
- Thomas of Monmouth, The Life and Passion of William of Norwich, (London: Penguin, 2014), ISBN 9780141197487, trans. with an introduction Miri Rubin
- Cities of Strangers: Making Lives in Medieval Europe (Cambridge: Cambridge University Press, 2020), ISBN 9781108666510
