= Marcus Merriman =

British historian (1940–2006)

Marcus H. Merriman
- Born: 3 May 1940; Baltimore, Maryland, USA
- Died: 2006 (aged 65–66); Lancaster, UK

Academic background
- Education: Bowdoin College, Maine; University of Grenoble; University of Edinburgh; Institute of Historical Research, London (PhD)
- Thesis: The struggle for the marriage of Mary Queen of Scots: English and French intervention in Scotland, 1543–1550 (1971)
- Doctoral advisor: Stanley Bindoff

Academic work
- Discipline: Historian
- Institutions: University of Lancaster (1964–2006)

Marcus Homer Merriman (1940–2006) was a historian and academic researching Anglo-Scottish relations in the 16th century and their European context.

== Background ==
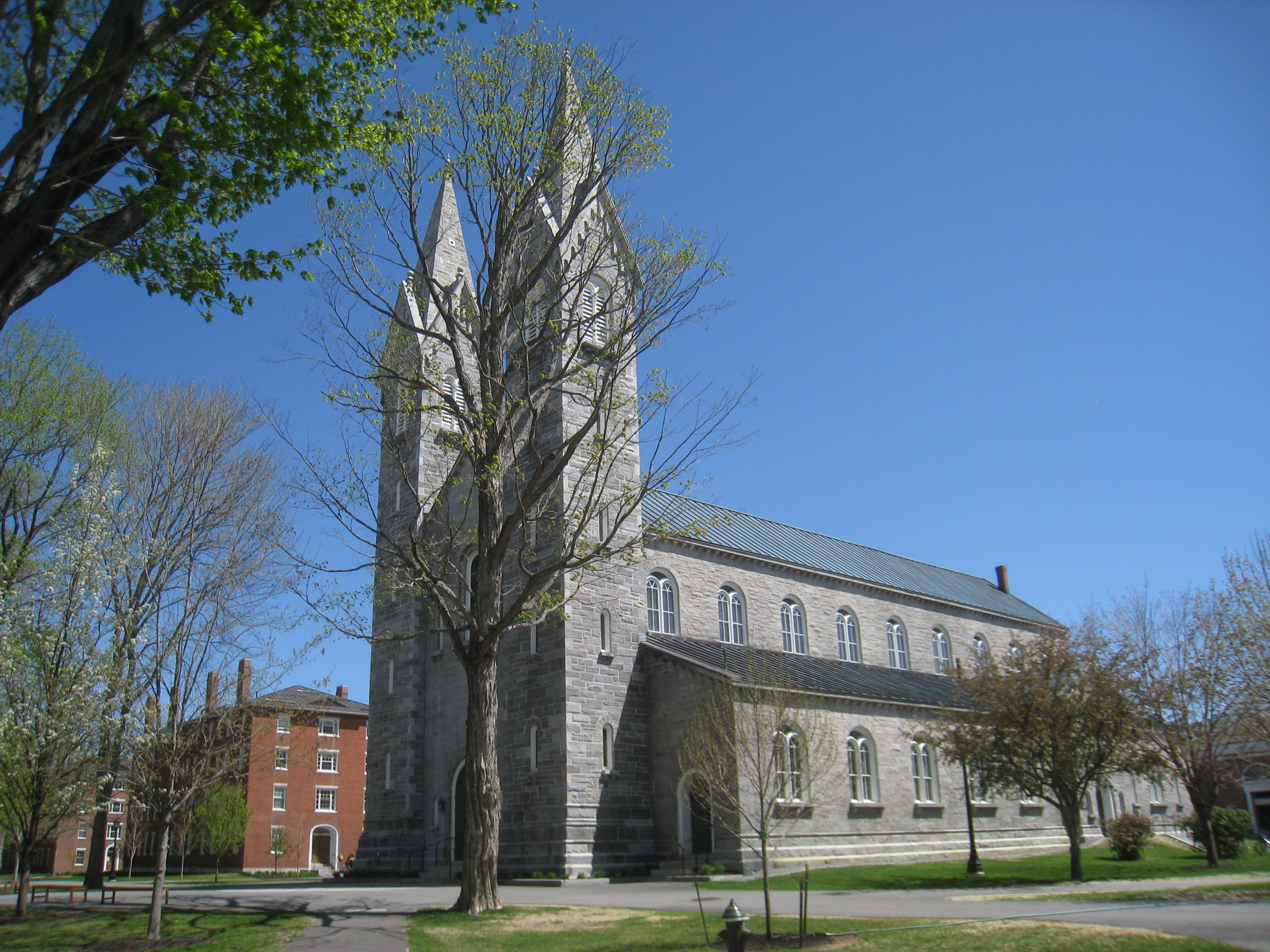
Bowdoin College Chapel

Merriman was born in Baltimore on 3 May 1940. Educated at Bowdoin College, Maine, and the University of Grenoble, he spent a year at Edinburgh University, then completed his PhD at the Institute of Historical Research, London University under the supervision of Stanley Bindoff in 1971.

== Career ==
Alexandra Square, Lancaster University

Merriman spent his working life at Lancaster University as Assistant Lecturer in History (1964–66), Lecturer in History (1966–92) and Senior Lecturer in History (1992–2006). He was also visiting professor of history at Queens College, City University of New York and Syracuse University (1969–70), and visiting professor at Bowdoin College (1975–6). His published works are mostly concerned with the Anglo-Scottish war of the Rough Wooing which began following negotiations to marry Mary, Queen of Scots to King Edward VI of England. He was also Associate Editor of the Sixteenth Century Journal (1979–82). In 1990, he was honoured with the Cadbury Schweppes National Award for innovation in teaching.

At Lancaster, Merriman was Vice-Principal of Pendle College and was credited for his part in the design of the college buildings. He regularly took his students on study trips to Scotland, hiring a boat to visit the ruined 16th-century fortifications on Inchkeith.

Pendle College's central building is named the Merriman Block in his honour, and the Marcus Merriman Travel Grant is awarded to successful students from Pendle College. The purpose of the grant being to enable students to travel in order to take part in a project that would broaden their experience and provide a benefit to others.

== Publications ==
- Merriman, M.H. (1968), "The Assured Scots: Scottish Collaborators with England during the Rough Wooing, 1543–1550", Scottish Historical Review, 47: 10–35
- Merriman, M.H. (1979–80), "War and Propaganda during the "Rough Wooing"", Scottish Tradition, 9/10: 20–30
- Merriman, M.H. (1982), "The Scottish Border", in Colvin, H. M. (ed.), The History of the King's Works: IV, London: HMSO, pp. 607–726, ISBN 978-0116-708-32-8
- Merriman, M.H. (1983), "Italian Military Engineers in Britain in the 1540s", in Tyacke, S. (ed.), English Map Making, London: British Library, pp. 57–67, ISBN 978-0712-300-10-0
- Merriman, M.H. (1984), "'The Epistle to the Queen's Majestie' and its 'Platte'", Architectural History, 27: 25–32, doi:10.2307/1568447, JSTOR 1568447, S2CID 194062409
- Merriman, M.H. (1987), "James Henrisoun and 'Great Britain': British Union and the Scottish Commonweal", in Mason, Roger A. (ed.), Scotland and England, 1286–1815, Edinburgh: John Donald, pp. 85–112, ISBN 978-0859-761-77-2
- Merriman, M.H. (1988), "Mary, Queen of France", in Lynch, M. J. (ed.), Mary Stewart, Queen in Three Kingdoms, Oxford: Wiley-Blackwell also "Mary, Queen of France", Innes Review, vol. 38, 1988, pp. 30–32, ISBN 978-0631-152-63-7
- Merriman, M.H. (1988), "The Eyemouth forts: Anvils of Union?", Scottish Historical Review, 67: 142–155
- Merriman, M.H. (June 1991), "Realm and Castle: Henry VIII as a European Builder", History Today, 41: 31–37
- Merriman, M.H. (1996), "Home thoughts from abroad: Scottish exiles in the mid-16th Century", in Grant, A.; Stringer, K. (eds.), Uniting the Kingdoms? The Making of British History, London: Routledge, pp. 111–22, ISBN 978-0415-130-41-7
- Merriman, M.H. (1999), "Intelligens to asseg, Migliorino Ubaldini and the Fortification of Scotland in 1548", in Viganò, Marino (ed.), Architetti e ingegneri militari italiani all'estero dal XV al XVII secolo, vol. ii, Silabe, pp. 233–255
- Merriman, M.H. (2000), The Rough Wooings: Mary Queen of Scots, 1542–1551, Edinburgh: Tuckwell Press, ISBN 1-86232-090-X
