= Frank Tipton =

Australian historian

Frank B. Tipton
- Born: 5 November 1943 (age 82); California
- Education: Harvard University, Stanford University
- Known for: Economic History, History of Germany
- Spouse: Elise K. Tipton
- Scientific career
- Fields: History
- Doctoral advisor: David Landes
- Other academic advisors: Simon Kuznets

Frank Ben Tipton (born 1943) is an Australian historian and Emeritus Professor at The University of Sydney Business School. He is known for his works on Modern history of Germany and economic history.

== Bibliography ==
- Tipton FB 1976 'Regional Variations in the Economic Development of Germany during the Nineteenth Century', Wesleyan University Press, Middletown, Connecticut, United States
- Tipton, F. and Robert Aldrich. An Economic and Social History of Europe (1987), two volumes
- Tipton FB 1992 'Storia economica [Economic history]', Milan: Jaca Book. French translation: Histoire Économique. Paris: Editions Mentha, Milan and Paris, Italy
- Frank B. Tipton (1993), “Historical Perspectives on the Problem of Regional Integration in a United Germany” in the European Studies Journal, volume X: United Germany and Europe: Towards 1990 and Beyond, pages 57–77
- Tipton FB, Jarvis D and Welch A 2003 'Re-defining the borders between public and private in Southeast Asia: Malaysia, Philippines, Vietnam, Thailand and Indonesia. Financial sector, telecommunications, information and communications technologies, higher education', The Research Institute for Asia and the Pacific (RIAP), Sydney, Australia
- Frank B. Tipton, A History of Modern Germany Since 1815, Berkeley: University of California, 2003, ISBN 9780520240506
- Tipton FB 2007 'The Asian Firms: History, Institutions and Management', Edward Elgar, London, United Kingdom, pp. 432
