= The Intelligent Woman's Guide to Socialism and Capitalism =

1928 book by George Bernard Shaw

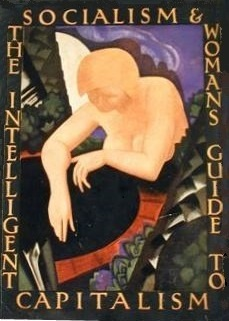
- Author: George Bernard Shaw
- Language: English
- Genre: Non-fiction
- Publication date: 1928

The Intelligent Woman's Guide to Socialism and Capitalism is a non-fiction book written by the Irish playwright George Bernard Shaw. The book employs socialist and Marxist thought. It was written in 1928 after his sister-in-law, Mary Stewart Cholmondeley, asked him to write a pamphlet explaining socialism. The book was later re-released as the first Pelican Book in 1937. The dust jacket artwork for the British and American first editions was by the British artist and sculptor Eric Kennington.

In the book, Shaw examines various socialist ideas, including the issue of private property under socialism, population control, the difficulty of creating non-market-based means to ascribe value to human activities and the problem of wealth distribution. He explores Marxist concepts such as surplus value along with the ideas of non-Marxist socialist thinkers such as Henry George.

== Reception ==
The book inspired a respectful and detailed reply from trailblazing sociologist and prison reformer Lilian Le Mesurier in The Socialist Woman's Guide to Intelligence: a reply to Mr. Shaw first published in 1929. Le Mesurier objected to Shaw's self-satisfied and condescending tone.

== Editions ==
In the late 1930s, Allen Lane, the founder of Penguin Books, wanted to create a new line, to be called "Pelican" books, which would be dedicated to publishing clear expositions of current social debates. He desired that Shaw's Intelligent Woman's Guide should become the first in that series. Shaw wrote to Lane that, since almost 10 years had elapsed, the book's title needed to be changed to The Intelligent Woman's Guide to Socialism, Capitalism, Sovietism, and Fascism; under that revamped title the book became the first Pelican, in two paperbound volumes, in 1937.

== In popular culture ==
The award-winning American playwright Tony Kushner referenced Shaw's book in the title he chose for his 2009 play, The Intelligent Homosexual's Guide to Capitalism and Socialism with a Key to the Scriptures.
