= Pendle College, Lancaster =

Constituent college of the University of Lancaster

Coordinates: 54.00617°N 2.78521°W

Pendle College
- Lancaster University
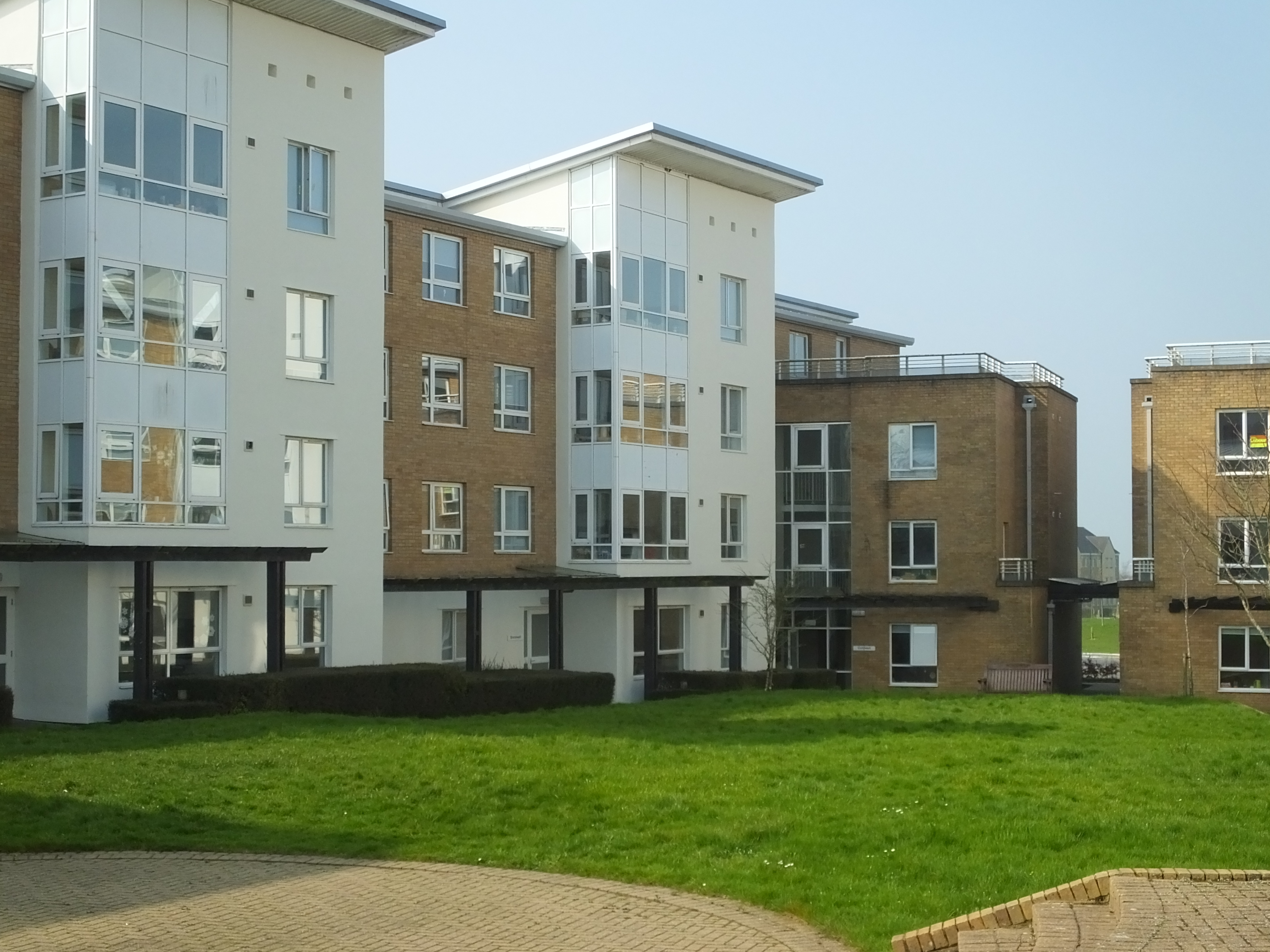
- Pendle standard accommodation
- Motto: Altiora sequamor (Latin)
- Motto in English: Seek to Climb to the Top
- Established: 1974
- Named for: Pendle Region
- Colours: Green; Yellow
- Principal: Martin Colclough
- JCR President: Sam Dosanjh
- Dean: Martin Walker
- Undergraduates: 1660
- Newspaper: The Pendle Witch
- Website: Pendle College

Pendle College is one of the constituent colleges of the University of Lancaster, England. Founded in 1974, the college is named after the Pendle witches of 1612, from the area around Pendle Hill in East Lancashire. The term "Pendle" is associated with a great deal of fantasy and legend.

== Accommodation ==
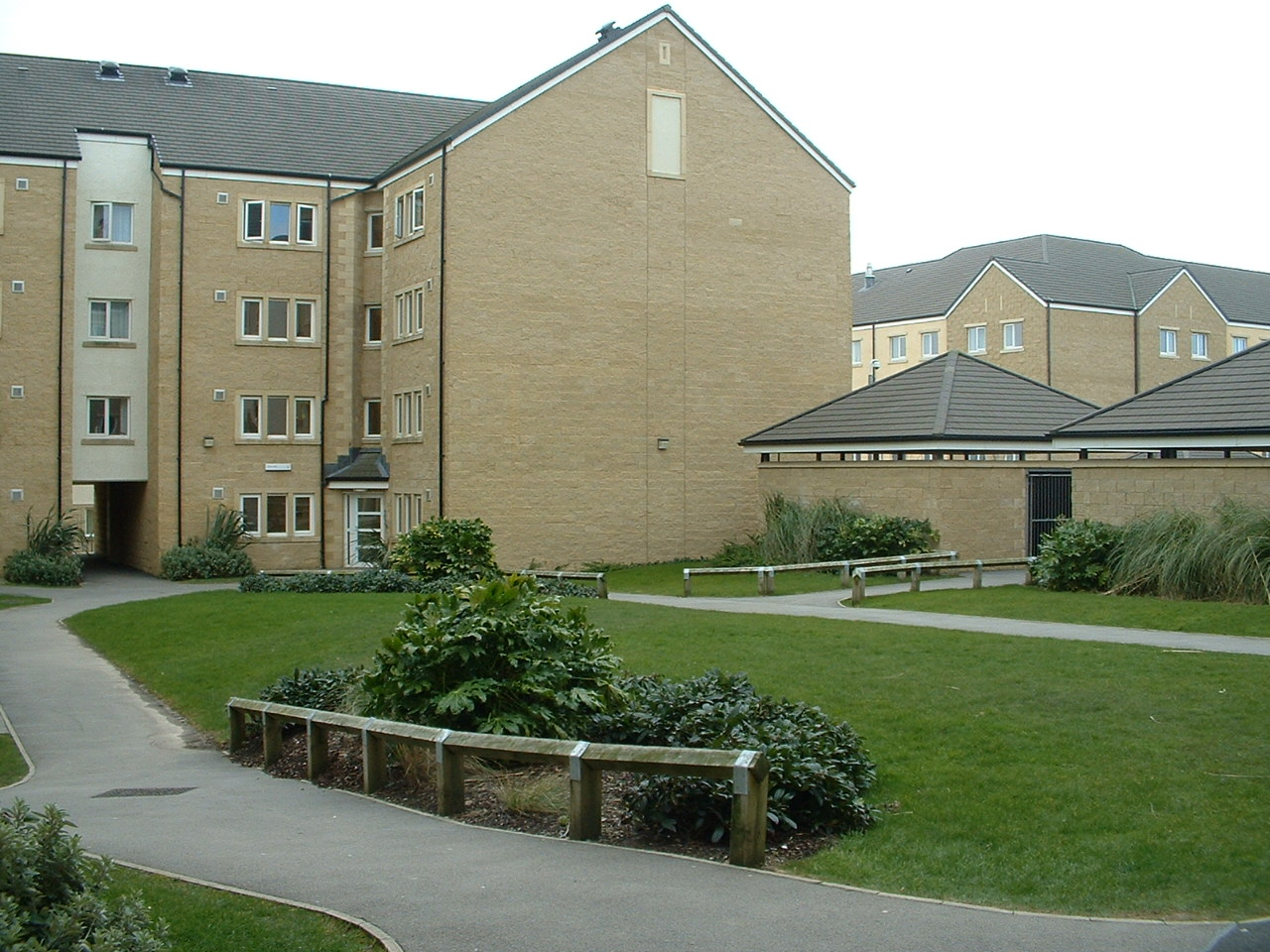
Pendle ensuite accommodation in Alexandra Park

With standard, en-suite and studio accommodation Pendle College has a wide choice of accommodation options. The college moved to its current location at the far south end of campus in 1994; Grizedale College had already incorporated the original Pendle buildings in 1993. When the university had floated proposals to build new college accommodation at what was then the southern end of campus, it was agnostic as to whether Grizedale or Pendle should take ownership of the new residences. The colleges' Senior Common Rooms were similarly unable to determine their position so the matter was decided through a drinking game conducted between students from both colleges. Grizedale won and elected to retain their existing college buildings and take over the existing Pendle buildings; Pendle would move to the new accommodation. The buildings completed in 1994 surround the college quadrangle and house 402 standard residence rooms.

Rooms situated in South West campus are subject to higher rents and have ensuite facilities. With its own quadrangle, Pendle standard rooms occupy nine blocks of the Alexandra Park complex. Ensuite rooms are available in blocks 24-28: Winewall; Higherford; Fence, Crowtrees and Brierfield. Self-contained studio accommodation is in block 29 - Barnoldswick.

Pendle Rooms includes the college kitchen, a meeting rooms called The Errington Room after a previous Principal, and JCR lounge called 'The Harpley Lounge' - named after the long serving College Manager Jill Harpley. The building features a balcony overlooking the quad. and has the best acoustics of all the bars on campus. Pendle College also houses a launderette, computer lab, secure bike sheds, college offices and the Porters' Lodge. The residential blocks in Pendle are numbered, starting with the bar. The two-storey bar is called the Merriman Block and is named after former college vice-principal and history lecturer Marcus Merriman.

== Symbols ==
The De Lacy's purple lion crest

The college crest depicts a lion rampant standing on top of Pendle Hill with a witch's broom. The lion is taken from the arms of the Norman lords of the Pendle area, the de Lacys. The Latin motto "altiora sequamor" means "seek to climb to the top". The Junior Common Room College logo is a black witch on a full moon. The Pendle JCR motto is Venue of Legends. The college colours are green and yellow.

== Governance ==
The statutes of the university established the college. Internally, the key committee that runs the College is the College Syndicate.

The Junior Common Room (JCR) consists of all Pendle undergraduates. The term JCR is often used in reference to elected executive committee of the JCR, who are also known as the JCR Exec. The executive committee undertake a variety of tasks, ranging from organising social events to co-ordinating sports, producing publicity and offering education and welfare services.

Most college officers are drawn from the Senior Common Room (SCR), although the Assistant Deans are both JCR members as well as being a part of the SCR. The SCR is composed of all University staff who are also members of Pendle.

== Notable alumni ==
- Hilton Dawson, Former MP for Lancaster
- Alan Milburn, Former MP and former Chancellor of the Duchy of Lancaster
- James May, Journalist, TV presenter BBC Top Gear
- Ranvir Singh, Journalist, TV presenter BBC North West Tonight
