= Mellon: An American Life =

2006 biography by David Cannadine

- Author: Sir David Cannadine
- Language: English
- Subject: History, Business history, U.S. history
- Genre: Biography
- Publisher: Alfred A. Knopf
- Publication date: 2006
- Publication place: England
- Media type: Hardcover (print)
- Pages: 778
- ISBN: 9780307386793
- LC Class: E748.M52 C36 2006

Mellon: An American Life is a biographical book detailing the life Andrew Mellon (1855–1937), American banker, businessman, and philanthropist. Written by Sir David Cannadine, Dodge Professor of History at Princeton University, the book describes how Mellon built his personal wealth by investing and running businesses in major industries, eventually becoming the Secretary of the Treasury under Presidents Warren Harding, Calvin Coolidge, and Herbert Hoover. He was also noted for founding the National Gallery of Art in Washington, D.C. Cannadine acknowledges the controversy that surrounds Mellon and the other industrialists of his era. Like John D. Rockefeller Jr., Henry Clay Frick, Andrew Carnegie, John Pierpont Morgan Sr., and William Randolph Hearst, the businessmen were part of a fundamental transformation of the American economy in the late-nineteenth and early-twentieth centuries.

A previous commissioned biography was written by Burton J. Hendrick, a well known historian and biographer of Andrew Carnegie. But, after the book was written, it was decided that it would not be published. Over 30 years later, Cannadine was commissioned to write the book by Andrew Mellon's son, Paul Mellon (1907–1999). He had access to the family's private archives and personal interviews.

== Overview ==
The book focuses on four areas of Mellon's life: business, politics, art collector, and philanthropist. He stresses that Mellon was not a self-made financier, thereby not embodying a rags-to-riches story, but rather a riches-to-more-riches story. In 1902, he was worth about $20 million, while in 1921, $135 million; and in 1930, about $170 million.

Cannadine also chronicles Mellon's economic and political ideology. He was an ardent supporter of laissez-faire capitalism. But, as the author notes, he also believed in protectionism and the right for monopolies to exist. Thus, Mellon was an ardent supporter of the Republican party, and subsequently became the Secretary of the Treasury under President Harding. During his time as Secretary of the Treasury, from 1921 to 1931, Mellon reduces the federal tax rate, reduced the national debt by a third, and restored the gold standard. He was a supporter of trickle-down economics.

He then traces the events that led to Mellon's downfall: the Wall Street crash of 1929, the loss in confidence from President Hoover, and his resignation from the Treasury in 1932. He resigns and becomes United States Ambassador to the United Kingdom briefly. After his departure from public life, Mellon then turned to art collecting and philanthropy. Over the course of his life, Mellon gave away nearly $10 million, much of which went to charities in Pittsburgh, Pennsylvania and the National Gallery of Art.

== Reception ==
The book received high praise, both from academics and from the public. Among the former, Eric Arnesen, professor of history at the University of Illinois at Chicago, states 'Cannadine tells that story in copious detail with considerable skill and sensitivity... [he] admirably succeeds in filling in what he views as a significant gap in American biography and history.' Robert Whaples, professor of economics at Wake Forest University, compliments the degree to which Cannadine remained sympathetic and fair to Mellon despite him being, as Cannadine describes, 'an unsympathetic person with unappealing politics'.

Outside of academia, the book was selected as one of the Best Non-Fiction Books of 2006 by the Boston Globe. Rachel Aspden of The Guardian described the book was 'mesmerising'. Roger Lowenstein, writing in The New York Times, praises Cannadine's "'fascinating' biography as a 'compelling portrait of a dour and lonely financier who was wounded in love, disappointed in his children and, tragically, ill-rewarded by his government." Christoph DeMuth, then President of the American Enterprise Institute, claimed the book was the best biography of Mellon thus far, and the only one.

== See also ==
- Gilded Age
