= Ornamentalism =

2001 book by Sir David Cannadine

Ornamentalism: How the British Saw Their Empire
- Author: Sir David Cannadine
- Language: English
- Genre: History
- Publisher: Oxford University Press
- Publication date: 2001
- Publication place: United Kingdom
- Pages: 264
- ISBN: 978-0195157949

Ornamentalism: How the British Saw Their Empire is a book by David Cannadine about British perceptions of the British Empire. Cannadine argues that class, rank and status were more important to the British Empire than race. The title of the work Ornamentalism is a direct reference to Edward Said's book Orientalism, which argues the existence of prejudiced outsider interpretations of the East ("the Other"), shaped by the attitudes of European imperialism in the 18th and 19th centuries. It has also been argued to borrow tones from the title of Joseph Schumpeter's "Imperialism and Social Classes", which some historians see as the origins of the 'Ornamentalist' perspective in academic history'.

== Analysis ==
Ornamentalism presents a new view of the British Empire through an economic, social, and political lens. It argues that the British were motivated not only by race, but also by class to expand the empire. Cannadine traces the origins of this view to the local governments of sixteenth-century Tory England where those with high social prestige dominated. He argues that, by extension, "many British settlers overseas sought to create a full-scale replica of the elaborately graded social hierarchy they had left behind at home" (14). Additional evidence comes from the deference to Queen Victoria in both white and non-white colonies: "the British Empire was a royal empire, presided over and unified by a sovereign of global amplitude and semi-divine fullness, and suffused with the symbols and signifiers of kingship, which reinforced, legitimated, unified and completed the empire as a realm bound together by order, hierarchy, tradition and subordination" (102). Another key theme was a culture of ornamentalism that developed following Benjamin Disraeli's Royal Titles Act 1876 that declared Queen Victoria Empress of India. National distinctions of class and inequality in Britain directly diffused throughout the empire.

P. J. Marshall states that Cannadine makes two arguments in Ornamentalism:

- "...the history of the British empire and the history of Britain itself are inseparable and must be studied as a seamless whole"
- "the high days of British imperialism, that is from about 1850 to about 1950, the history of the empire and that of Britain were brought together by a British commitment to reproduce overseas the kind of hierarchical society that, Cannadine believes, existed in Britain"

== Criticism ==
Ornamentalism has attracted considerable attention from both academics and the public. Stanley Hoffmann, a history professor at Harvard University described the book as "delightful and instructive", revealing a "far more complex reality" of the British Empire. Richard Gott, a journalist and historian, argued that "his book is not just a restatement of traditional conservative history, it is a romantic and postmodernist version suitable for the New Labour era."

The book has also been criticized for underplaying the racial elements of the British imperial project. This view was echoed by Fouad Ajami, a former professor of Middle Eastern history and politics at Princeton University and Johns Hopkins University. Gyan Prakash, a historian and professor at Princeton University, argued that "The empire itself was based on a racial divide -- you cannot get away from that."

== See also ==
- Imperialism
- Edward Said and Orientalism
- Historiography of the British Empire
