= Alden S. Gooch =

American cardiologist

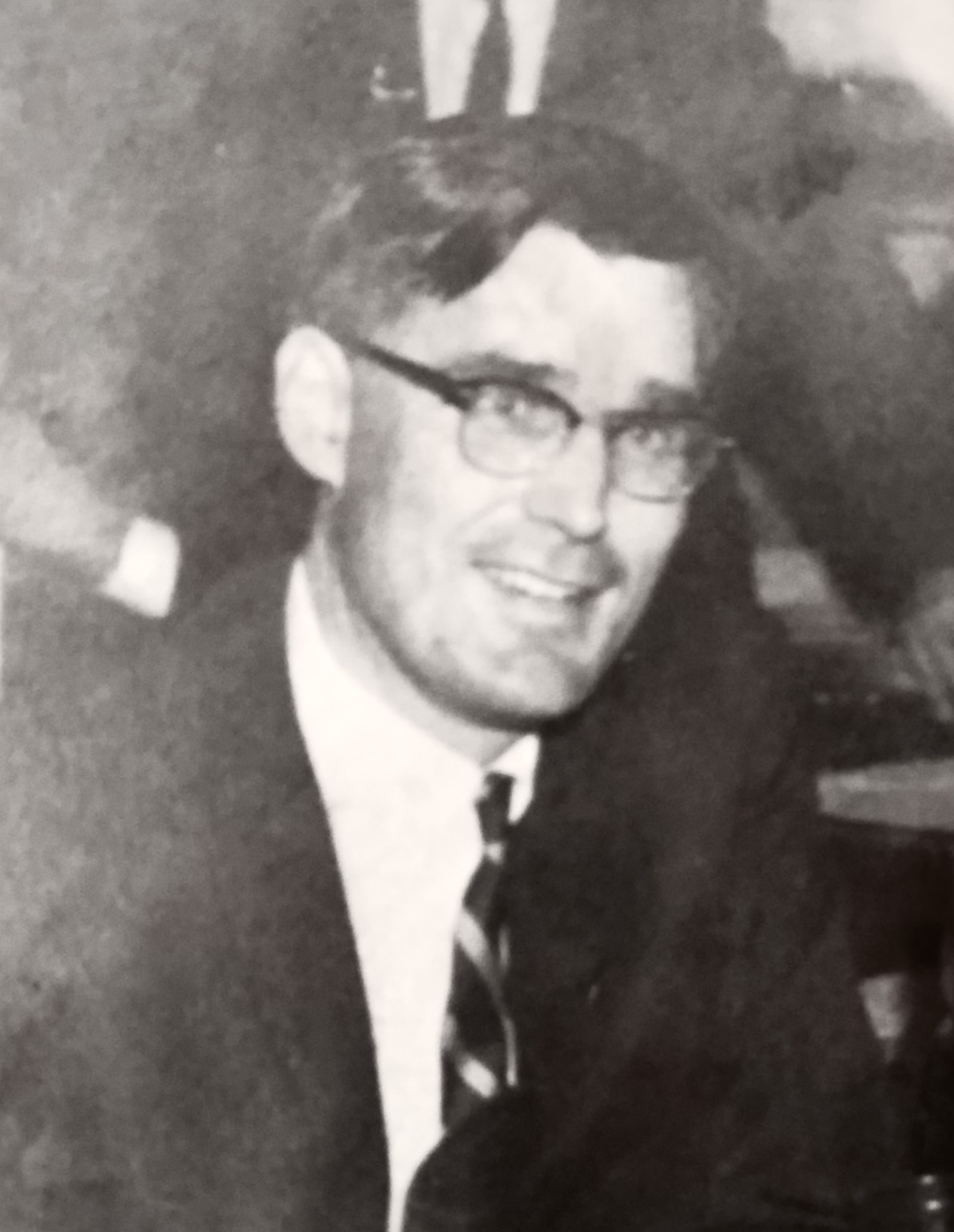
- Born: May 5, 1927; Bar Harbor, Maine
- Died: August 20, 1987 (aged 60); Medford, New Jersey
- Education: University of Maine; University of Rochester School of Medicine
- Occupation: Cardiologist
- Spouse: Alice Gooch (m. 1947)

Alden S. Gooch, MD, (May 5, 1927 - August 20, 1987) was an American cardiologist and vice chairman of the Department of Cardiovascular Disease at Deborah Heart and Lung Center in Browns Mills, New Jersey. He was best known for his book, Clues to Diagnosis in Congenital Heart Disease. He was an authority on the systolic click murmur syndrome, tricuspid regurgitation, and arrhythmias in exercise stress testing.

== Early life and education ==
Gooch was born in Bar Harbor, Hancock County, Maine, one of four children.

He served as a Lieutenant in the U.S. Navy in 1945, then he received his Bachelor of Arts degree from the University of Maine, in Orono, Maine in 1951.

He earned his medical degree in 1955 from the University of Rochester in Rochester, New York. He received his residency and fellowship training at George Washington University in Washington D.C. He later taught and conducted research as an assistant professor of cardiology. Ultimately, he practiced Cardiology, conducted research and taught as he expanded the Fellowship Program at the Deborah Heart and Lung Center.

== Publications ==
Clues to Diagnosis in Congenital Heart Disease was published in 1969 by F.A Davis. The book's purpose was to "demonstrate the application of useful information in the diagnosis of congenital heart disease by illustrating various clues (or non-clues) to the diagnosis." Cases were "superbly demonstrated" with "striking display of graphic data." It (is) "a useful way of teaching of Congenital Heart Disease" and "present(ed) a challenge in diagnosis to the reader".

His research focused on cardiac mitral and tricuspid valve disease. His work was widely cited by other researchers. Specifically, he outlined the left ventricular abnormalities that were associated with mitral Valve Disease and its associated heart rhythm abnormalities. His research on tricuspid valve disease was highly influential.

=== Bibliography ===
- Massumi, Rashid A.; Rios, Jorge C.; Gooch, Alden S.; Nutter, Donald; De Vita, Vincent T.; Datlow, Donald W. (January 1965). "Primary Myocardial Disease: Report of Fifty Cases and Review of the Subject". Circulation. 31 (1): 19–41. doi:10.1161/01.CIR.31.1.19. PMID 14247526. S2CID 42664036.
- Cha, Se Do; Desai, Rashmikant S.; Gooch, Alden S.; Maranhao, Vladir; Goldberg, Harry (December 1982). "Diagnosis of Severe Tricuspid Regurgitation". Chest. 82 (6): 726–731. doi:10.1378/chest.82.6.726. PMID 7140400.
- Gooch, Alden S.; McConnell, Dorothy (November 1970). "Analysis of transient arrhythmias and conduction disturbances occurring during submaximal treadmill exercise testing". Progress in Cardiovascular Diseases. 13 (3): 293–307. doi:10.1016/0033-0620(70)90004-6. PMID 5473007.
- Cha, S. D.; Gooch, AS (1 September 1983). "Diagnosis of tricuspid regurgitation. Current status". Archives of Internal Medicine. 143 (9): 1763–1768. doi:10.1001/archinte.143.9.1763. PMID 6615098.
- Gooch, Alden S.; Maranhão, Vladir; Scampardonis, Gregory; Cha, Se Do; Yang, Sing San (14 December 1972). "Prolapse of Both Mitral and Tricuspid Leaflets in Systolic Murmur-Click Syndrome". New England Journal of Medicine. 287 (24): 1218–1222. doi:10.1056/NEJM197212142872403. PMID 5084986.
- Gooch, Alden S. (November 1972). "Exercise testing for detecting changes in cardiac rhythm and conduction". The American Journal of Cardiology. 30 (7): 741–746. doi:10.1016/0002-9149(72)90148-8. PMID 5084773.
- Maranhao, Viadir; Gooch, Alden S.; Yang, Sing S.; Sumathisena, D. R.; Goldberg, Harry H. (1975). "Prolapse of the Tricuspid Leaflets in the Systolic Murmer-Click Syndrome". Catheterization and Cardiovascular Diagnosis. 1 (1): 81–90. doi:10.1002/ccd.1810010111. PMID 1222411.
- Gooch, Alden S.; Calatayud, Juan B.; Rogers, Jerry B.; Gorman, Patrick A. (May 1966). "Analysis of the P Wave in Severe Aortic Stenosis". Diseases of the Chest. 49 (5): 459–463. doi:10.1378/chest.49.5.459. PMID 5935883.
- Cha, Se Do; Gooch, Alden S.; Maranhao, Vladir; Koehler, Eugene (September 1981). "Intracardiac phonocardiography in tricuspid regurgitation: Relation to clinical and angiographic findings". The American Journal of Cardiology. 48 (3): 578–583. doi:10.1016/0002-9149(81)90091-6. PMID 7270464.

== Career and professional affiliations ==
At George Washington University, Gooch served as assistant professor of medicine and associate director of the Heart Station from 1966 to 1969. At Deborah Heart and Lung Center, he served as the vice chairman of the division of cardiology, director of the outpatient clinic, and director of the cardiology training program. He also served as the associate professor of medicine at the Robert Wood Johnson Medical School of Rutgers University and held the same position at Temple University School of Medicine. Throughout his career, in addition to his book, he edited three books and published over 75 scientific articles and 20 abstracts.

He was also a visiting lecturer at Albert Einstein Medical Center and a representative of the New Jersey Council of Clinical Cardiology to the American Heart Association.

Gooch was a fellow at the following organizations:

- American Heart Association
- American College of Cardiology
- American College of Chest Diseases
- American College of Angiology
- American Federation of Clinical Research

== Personal life ==
In 1947, he married Alice Hall of New Haven, Connecticut, and had five children. He died in 1987 in Medford, New Jersey. He was the brother of Brison Gooch.
