= Peter Salway =

British historian

Professor Peter Salway FSA
- Born: 1932 (age 93–94)
- Title: Professor of the History and Archaeology of Roman Britain

Academic background
- Education: Sidney Sussex College, Cambridge

Peter Salway, FSA (born 1932) is a British historian, who specialises in Roman Britain. He lectured at the universities of Durham, Cambridge, Bristol and Oxford, before becoming Professor of the History and Archaeology of Roman Britain at the Open University.

== Early life ==
From 1951 to 1958, Salway studied at Sidney Sussex College, Cambridge. He gained a Bachelor of Arts (BA) that was later promoted to Master of Arts (MA), and a Doctor of Philosophy (PhD).

== Academic career ==
From 1956 to 1957, Salway was the Sir James Knott Research Fellow at King's College, a University of Durham college in Newcastle. He returned to Sidney Sussex College, Cambridge as a fellow from 1957 to 1964. While there, he served as Praelector and then Dean. He was a Senior Lecturer at the University of Bristol from 1964 to 1965. He was also Warden of Hiatt Baker Hall, one of the university's halls of residence.

In 1965, Salway joined All Souls College, Oxford as domestic bursar. He served in that role until 1969 when he was elected a Quondam Fellow of the College. In 1970, he joined the Open University as Regional Director for the West Midlands. From 1983 to 1989, he was also Professor of the History and Archaeology of Roman Britain.

Salway retired in 1991 and was appointed an Emeritus Fellow of the Open University. He remains a Quondam Fellow of All Souls College, Oxford.

Salway is the author of Roman Britain (1981), a volume in the Oxford History of England series.

== Honours ==
On 7 January 1960, Salway was elected a Fellow of the Society of Antiquaries (FSA).

== Selected works ==
- Salway, Peter (1965). The frontier people of Roman Britain. Cambridge: Cambridge University Press. ISBN 978-0521061872.
- Salway, Peter, ed. (1969). Roman archaeology and art: essays and studies by Sir Ian Richmond. London: Faber and Faber. ISBN 978-0571088416.
- Salway, Peter (1982). Roman Britain. Oxford: Clarendon Press. ISBN 978-0198217176.
- Salway, Peter (1993). The Oxford illustrated history of Roman Britain. Oxford: Oxford University Press. ISBN 978-0198229841.
- Salway, Peter (2000). Roman Britain: a very short introduction (1st ed.). Oxford: Oxford University Press. ISBN 978-0192854049.
- Salway, Peter, ed. (2002). The Roman era: the British Isles, 55 BC-AD 410. Oxford: Oxford University Press. ISBN 978-0198731931.
- Salway, Peter (2015). Roman Britain: a very short introduction (2nd ed.). Oxford: Oxford University Press. ISBN 978-0198712169.
