= Stanley Bindoff =

English historian (1908-1980)

- Born: Stanley Thomas Bindoff; 8 April 1908; Hove, England
- Died: 23 December 1980 (aged 72); Surbiton, London, England
- Occupations: Historian and academic
- Known for: Tudor England (1950)
- Spouse: Marjorie Blatcher (m. 1938; died 1979)
- Children: 2

Academic background
- Education: University College London; Brighton, Hove and Sussex Grammar School

Academic work
- Discipline: History
- Sub-discipline: Early modern Britain; History of parliamentarism; Political history
- Institutions: Queen Mary, University of London
- Doctoral students: Eric Ives; Marcus Merriman

Stanley Thomas Bindoff (8 April 1908 – 23 December 1980) was an English historian who specialised in the Tudor and Elizabethan periods. He was the first professor of history at Queen Mary College, University of London. He was the editor of The History of Parliament for the parliaments of 1509–1558, published in 1982.

== Background ==
Bindoff was born in Hove on 8 April 1908. He was educated at Brighton, Hove and Sussex Grammar School and University College London.

== Career ==
Bindoff is best known for his book Tudor England, which R. H. Tawney stated "deserves to become a classic" upon its publication in 1950. Its enduring appeal compared to the other works in the Pelican History of England series derived, for William Lamont, from Bindoff's understanding of Tudor politics as "essentially trivial". He supervised many graduate students, Eric Ives and Marcus Merriman among them.

== Personal life and death ==
In 1938, Bindoff married Marjorie Blatcher, with whom he had two children; she died in 1979. Bindoff died from bronchopneumonia the following year, on 23 December 1980, in Surbiton; he was 72. A lecture series in Bindoff's name at Queen Mary was inaugurated by his colleague Eric Hobsbawm in 1990.

== Selected publications ==
- Geyl, Pieter. The Netherlands Divided, 1609–1648 ... (Based on Geschiedenis van de Nederlandsche Stam.) Williams & Norgate, London, 1936. (Translator)
- The Scheldt Question to 1839, etc. G. Allen & Unwin, London, 1945.
- Ket's Rebellion 1549. George Philip & Son, London, 1949.
- Tudor England. Penguin Books, Harmondsworth, 1950. (Pelican History of England, vol. 5) LCCN 67-35446
- The fame of Sir Thomas Gresham. Jonathan Cape, London, 1973. (Neale lecture in English history No. 4) ISBN 0224009281
- The House of Commons, 1509–1558. Secker & Warburg, London, 1982. (Editor) ISBN 9780436042829
