= Brison D. Gooch =

American historian (1925–2014)

- Born: March 1, 1925; Bar Harbor, Maine, U.S.
- Died: November 25, 2014 (aged 89)
- Education: Miami University; University of Wisconsin (PhD)
- Occupation: Historian
- Parent(s): Austin McLellan Gooch; Clara Helen Dowling
- Relatives: Alden S. Gooch (brother)

Brison D. Gooch (March 1, 1925 – November 25, 2014) was an American historian specializing in 19th century European history, especially Belgium and France. He was author of numerous monographs, and especially wrote undergraduate oriented textbooks.

== Bibliography ==
- "A Century of Historiography on the Origins of the Crimean War' American Historical Review, 62#1 (1956): 33-58 online
- "The Crimean War in Selected Documents and Secondary Works since 1940." Victorian Studies 1.3 (1958): 271-279 online.
- The new Bonapartist general in the Crimean War: distrust and decision-making in the Angle-French alliance. (The Hague: Nijhoff, 1959). online
- "Belgium and the Prospective Sale of Cuba in 1837" The Hispanic American Historical Review v39 n3 (1959): 413-427 online.
- Belgium and the February Revolution (The Hague: M. Nijhoff, 1963) online.
- Editor, Napoleon III, man of destiny : Enlightened statesman or proto-fascist? (Holt, Rinehart, Winston, 1964) online.
- New Bonapartist Generals : Distrust and Decision-making in the Anglo-French Alliance (Sordrecht: Springer, 1967).
- Editor, Interpreting European history. 1: From the Renaissance to Napoleon (Dorsey Press, 1967) online
- Editor, Interpreting European history. 2: from Metternich to Present (Dorsey Press 1967). online
- Editor, Interpreting western civilization. 1, From Antiquity to the Sun King (Dorsey Press, 1969).
- Editor, Interpreting western civilization. 2, From the Enlightenment to the Present (Dorsey Press, 1969).
- The reign of Napoleon III (Rand, McNally, 1969).
- Editor, The origins of the Crimean War (Heath 1969)
- Europe in the nineteenth century: a history (Macmillan, 1971).
- The nineteenth century, 1815-1914 (Forum Press, 1973).
- The world of Europe since 1815 with Amos E Simpson and Vaughan B Baker (Forum Press, 1973).
- "Recent Literature on Queen Victoria's Little Wars" Victorian Studies, 17#2 (1973): 217-224 online.
- "An 1853 Formula for Ottoman Victory" Austrian History Yearbook, v14 (1978): 79–88.
- Louis Napoleon and Strasbourg with Shirley Jean Black (Silverton, Colo.: Ferrell Publications, 2004).
