= David Cannadine =

British author and historian

Sir David Cannadine FBA FRSL FSA FRHistS FRSA
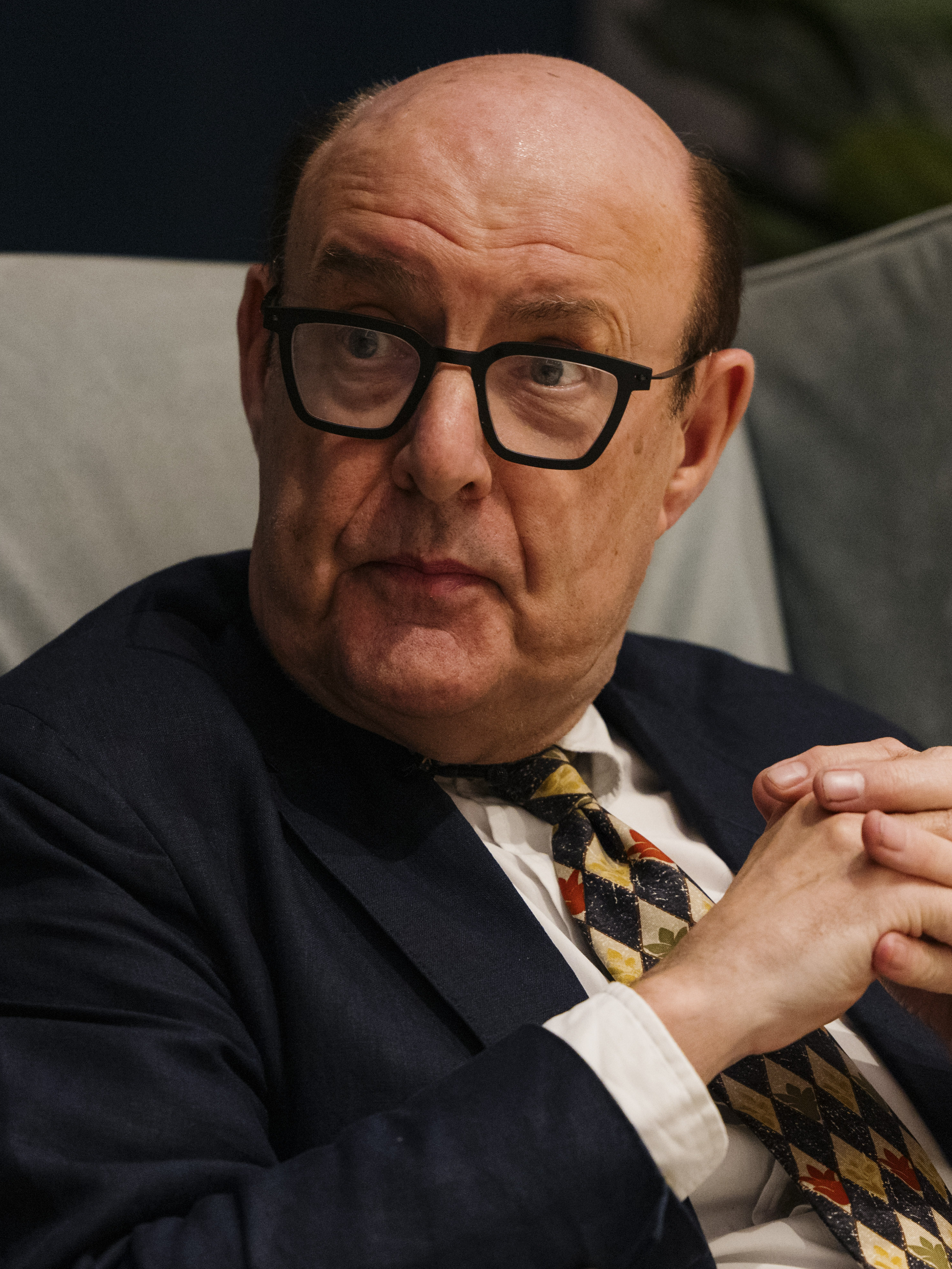
- Cannadine in 2026

President of the British Academy
- In office 2017–2021
- Preceded by: Lord Stern of Brentford
- Succeeded by: Julia Black

Personal details
- Born: David Nicholas Cannadine; 7 September 1950 (age 75) Birmingham, England
- Spouse: Linda Colley (m. 1982)
- Education: Clare College, Cambridge; St John's College, Oxford
- Awards: Knight Bachelor; FBA; FRSL; FSA; FRHistS

Sir David Nicholas Cannadine (born 7 September 1950) is a British author and historian who specialises in modern history, Britain and the history of business and philanthropy. He is currently the Dodge Professor of History at Princeton University, a visiting professor of history at Oxford University, and the editor of the Oxford Dictionary of National Biography. He was president of the British Academy between 2017 and 2021, the UK's national academy for the humanities and social sciences. He also serves as the chairman of the trustees of the National Portrait Gallery in London and vice-chair of the editorial board of Past & Present.

== Early life and education ==
David Nicholas Cannadine was born in Birmingham on 7 September 1950 and attended King Edward VI Five Ways School. He was educated at Clare College, Cambridge, where he took a double first in history; at St John's College, Oxford, where he completed his DPhil; and at Princeton University, where he was a Jane Eliza Procter Visiting Fellow.

== Academic career ==
After completing his graduate work, he returned to the University of Cambridge, where he was a research fellow at St John's College. He was then elected a fellow of Christ's College and appointed to a university lectureship in history.

Cannadine was appointed to the professorial chair of history at Columbia University in 1988, returning to Britain ten years later as director of the Institute of Historical Research at the University of London and, subsequently, as Queen Elizabeth the Queen Mother Professor of British History. In 2008 he joined the History Department of Princeton University from which he has announced his intention to retire at the end of the 2022–2023 academic year. In 2014 he was appointed Editor of the Oxford Dictionary of National Biography (ODNB) and also to a visiting professorship at the University of Oxford. Cannadine will step down from his editorship of the ODNB on 31 July 2026 in favour of William Whyte.

Cannadine has held many other visitorial appointments: at the Institute for Advanced Study at Princeton (twice), at the Swedish Collegium for Advanced Study in Uppsala (twice), at Birkbeck College, London, at the Whitney Humanities Center, Yale, at ANU Canberra, at the NHC North Carolina, at the Huntington Library and at New York University Stern School of Business. He is the general editor of the Penguin History of Britain and the Penguin History of Europe. He is currently completing a volume on the history of the Ford Foundation.

=== Works ===
Cannadine's books include The Decline and Fall of the British Aristocracy (1990); G. M. Trevelyan: A Life in History (1992); Class in Britain (1998); Ornamentalism: How the British Saw Their Empire (2001); Mellon: An American Life (2006); The Thirty Year Rule (jointly, 2009); The Right Kind of History (jointly, 2011); and The Undivided Past: Humanity Beyond our Differences (2013). His most recent publications are Victorious Century: The United Kingdom, 1800–1906 (2018), published for the Penguin History of Britain series, as well as two edited volumes on Westminster Abbey and on Anthony Blunt.

Cannadine has delivered many public lectures including the Raleigh Lecture at the British Academy (1997), the Carnochan Lecture at Stanford University (2001), the Linbury Lecture at the National Gallery (2002), the T. S. Eliot Lecture at Washington University in St. Louis (2003), the George Macaulay Trevelyan Lectures at the University of Cambridge (2007), the Inaugural Lecture for the Centre for British Studies at Humboldt University, Berlin (2010), the Crosby Kemper Lecture at Westminster College (Fulton, Missouri), the Jon Sigurosson Lecture at the University of Iceland (2012), the Haaga Lecture at the Huntington Library (2012), the Creighton Lecture at the University of Toronto (2013), the Robb Lectures at the University of Auckland, New Zealand (2015), the Wolfson Anniversary Lecture at the University of Glasgow (2015), the Oxford University Press Centenary Lecture (2017) and the Founder's Lecture at St John's College, Oxford (2019).

== Public work ==
Cannadine has served as a vice-president of the Royal Historical Society (1998–2002) and as a member of the advisory council, Public Record Office, subsequently National Archives (1999–2004); as a trustee and vice-chairman of the Kennedy Memorial Trust (1999–2010); as a trustee, vice-chair and chair of the National Portrait Gallery (2000–12); as a commissioner of English Heritage (2001–09) and as Chairman of its Blue Plaques Panel (2006–13); as a member of the Royal Mint Advisory Committee (2004–14); and as chair of Churchill 2015 (2013–15).

Cannadine is also widely known as a commentator on current events, in newspapers, on the radio and on television; he has been a long-standing contributor to A Point of View, broadcast on BBC Radio 4, as the successor to Alastair Cooke's Letter from America; and he has also written and presented a series of programmes on Churchill's Other Lives. He has been active in attempts to reform and improve the history curriculum in the United Kingdom. He also often contributes to contemporary discussions on the present-day British monarchy.

Currently, Cannadine serves as a member of the Bank of England Banknote Character Advisory Committee; he is a trustee of the Rothschild Archive, the Gordon Brown Archive and Gladstone's Library; and of the Library of Birmingham Development Trust, the Royal Academy Trust, Historic Royal Palaces and the Wolfson Foundation. He is also 168th president of The Birmingham & Midland Institute, a vice-president of the Victorian Society, vice-chairman of the Westminster Abbey Fabric Commission, and of the editorial board of Past & Present and president of the Friends of the Imperial War Museum.

== Honours and distinctions ==
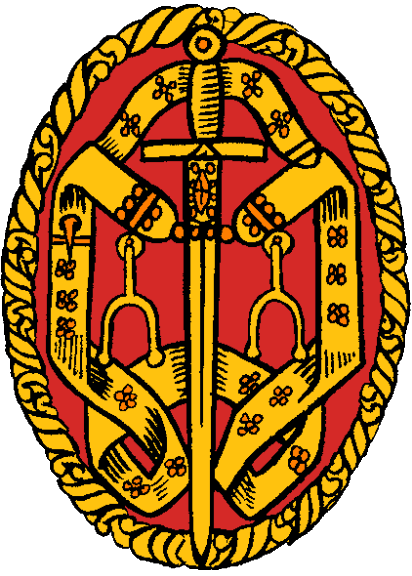
Insignia of a Knight Bachelor

Cannadine has been elected a Fellow of the Royal Historical Society (1981), a Fellow of the Royal Society of Arts (1998), a Fellow of the Royal Society of Literature (1999), a Fellow of the British Academy (1999), and a Fellow of the Society of Antiquaries (2005). He has been awarded the Lionel Trilling Prize (1991) and the Dean's Distinguished Award in the Humanities (1996) by Columbia University, the Dickinson Medal by the Newcomen Society (2003), the Minerva Medal of the Royal Philosophical Society of Glasgow (2013), the Norton Medlicott Medal of the Historical Association (2013), and the Blenheim Award of the International Churchill Society (2016).

Cannadine holds honorary degrees from the London South Bank University (2001), the University of East Anglia (2001), the University of Birmingham (2002), the University of Worcester (2011), Open University (2016), the University of London (2017), the University of Leicester (2019), Queen's University, Belfast (2020), and Aston University (2022). He is also an Honorary Fellow of the Institute of Historical Research (2005), Christ's College, Cambridge (2005), the Historical Association (2011), and Clare College, Cambridge (2012) and an Honorary Churchill Fellow of Westminster College, Fulton, Missouri (2012).

He was knighted for "services to scholarship" in 2009.

More recently, in April 2018 Cannadine was elected an international honorary member of the American Academy of Arts & Sciences. He was elected a member of the American Philosophical Society in 2019.

== Personal life ==
Cannadine is married to fellow historian Linda Colley.

== Publications ==
- Lords and Landlords: The Aristocracy and the Towns, 1774–1967 (1980)
- Patricians, Power and Politics in Nineteenth-century Towns (1982) (editor)
- 'Blood, Toil, Tears and Sweat': Winston Churchill's Famous Speeches (1989) (editor)
- The Pleasures of the Past (1989)
- The First Modern Society: Essays in English History in Honour of Lawrence Stone (1989) (editor) (with A.L. Beier and James Rosenheim)
- The Decline and Fall of the British Aristocracy (1990)
- G.M. Trevelyan: A Life in History (1992)
- Aspects of Aristocracy: Grandeur and Decline in Modern Britain (1994)
- The Rise and Fall of Class in Britain (1998)
- History in Our Time [review essays, 1988-97] (1998)
- Ornamentalism: How the British Saw Their Empire (2001)
- In Churchill's Shadow: Confronting the Past in Modern Britain (2002)
- What Is History Now? (2002) (editor)
- History and the Media (2004) (editor)
- Churchill in the Twenty-First Century (2004) (editor) (with Roland Quinault)
- Admiral Lord Nelson: Context and Legacy (2005) (editor)
- Gunpowder Plots: A Celebration of 400 Years of Bonfire Night (jointly 2005)
- Trafalgar: A Battle and its Afterlife (2006) (editor)
- Mellon: An American Life (2006)
- National Portrait Gallery: A Brief History (2007)
- Empire, the Sea and Global History: Britain's Maritime World, c.1763–c.1840 (2007) (editor)
- Making History Now and Then: Discoveries, Controversies and Explorations (2008)
- History and Philanthropy: Past, Present and Future (2008) (editor) (with Jill Pellew)
- The Thirty Year Rule (jointly, 2009)
- The Right Kind of History: Teaching the Past in Twentieth-Century England (2011) (with Jenny Keating and Nicola Sheldon)
- The Undivided Past: History Beyond Our Differences (2013)
- George V (Penguin Monarchs series) (2014)
- Heroic Chancellor: Winston Churchill and Bristol University (2015)
- Margaret Thatcher: A Life and Legacy (2017)
- Victorious Century: The United Kingdom, 1800–1906 (Penguin History of Britain) (2018)
- The Country House: Past, Present and Future (2018) (editor) (with Jeremy Musson)
- Why Collect Now? A Report on the State of Museums and of Collecting (2019)
- Westminster Abbey: A Church in History (2019) (editor)
- A Question of Retribution?: The British Academy and the Matter of Anthony Blunt (2020) (editor)
