= Paul B. Huber =

American economist (1934–2021)

Paul Bickford Huber (1934 – June 24, 2021) was an American economist and professor of economics at Dalhousie University (1965–1998). He served as a member of the executive board of the Association of Dalhousie Retirees and Pensions (ADRP).
