= New Oxford History of England =

Book series on the history of the British Isles

The New Oxford History of England is a book series on the history of the British Isles. It is the successor to the Oxford History of England (1934–86). Eleven volumes were published between 1989 and 2010, with several volumes still to come.

As of 2025, the following volumes have been published:

- England under the Norman and Angevin Kings, 1075–1225 — Robert Bartlett (2002), ISBN 9780199251018
- Plantagenet England, 1225–1360 — Michael Prestwich (2005), ISBN 9780199226870
- Shaping the Nation: England, 1360–1461 — G. L. Harriss (2005), ISBN 9780199211197
- The Later Tudors: England, 1547–1603 — Penry Williams (1995), ISBN 9780192880444
- A Land of Liberty? England, 1689–1727 — Julian Hoppit (2002), Paperback: ISBN 9780199251001; Hardcover: ISBN 9780198228424
- A Polite and Commercial People: England, 1727–1783 — Paul Langford (1989), ISBN 9780192852533
- A Mad, Bad, and Dangerous People? England, 1783–1846 — Boyd Hilton (2006), ISBN 9780199218912
- The Mid-Victorian Generation, 1846–1886 — K. Theodore Hoppen (1998), ISBN 9780198731993
- A New England? Peace and War, 1886–1918 — G. R. Searle (2005), ISBN 9780199284405
- Seeking a Role: The United Kingdom, 1951–1970 — Brian Harrison (2009), ISBN 9780198204763
- Finding a Role? The United Kingdom, 1970–1990 — Brian Harrison (2010), Paperback: ISBN 9780199606122; Hardcover: ISBN 9780199548750

== See also ==
- Penguin History of Britain (1986–2018)
- The Oxford History of the British Empire (1998–99)
