= Robert Aldrich (historian) =

Australian historian and writer

- Born: July 29, 1954 (age 72); New York, U.S.
- Occupations: Historian and writer

Robert F. Aldrich FAHA FASSA (born July 29, 1954, in New York) is an Australian historian and writer. Aldrich is Professor Emeritus of European History at the University of Sydney, where he taught from 1981-2021. He researches modern European and colonial history, particularly the French and British empires, as well as the history of modern monarchy.

== Life ==
After school Aldrich studied history in the United States of America, first at Emory University, Georgia, where he received his undergraduate degree, and afterwards at Brandeis University, Massachusetts, where he gained his Master's and PhD.

Aldrich joined the faculty at University of Sydney. He wrote several books on French colonialism in the Pacific and on the history of homosexuality.

== Awards and recognition ==
In 2002 the French government awarded Aldrich the Chevalier dans l'Ordre des Palmes Académiques. In 2008 he was elected a Fellow of both the Academy of the Social Sciences in Australia and the Australian Academy of the Humanities.

== Works ==
- An Economic and Social History of Europe, two volumes (1987) (with Frank Tipton) ISBN 978-0-333-36807-7
- The French Presence in the South Pacific, 1842–1940 (1990) ISBN 978-1349090860
- France's Overseas Frontier: Départements et Territoires d'Outre-Mer (together with John Connell) (1992) ISBN 978-0521390613
- France and the South Pacific since 1940 (1993) ISBN 9780824815585
- The Seduction of the Mediterranean: Writing, Art and Homosexual Fantasy (1993) ISBN 978-0415093125
- Greater France: A History of French Overseas Expansion (1996) ISBN 978-0312160005
- The Last Colonies (1998) ISBN 978-0521414616
- Who's Who in Contemporary Gay and Lesbian History (2000) (edited with Garry Wotherspoon) ISBN 978-0415229746
- Colonialism and Homosexuality (2003) ISBN 978-0415196161
- Vestiges of the Colonial Empire in France: Monuments, Museums and Colonial Memories (2005) ISBN 978-1403933706
- Gay Life and Culture: A World History, published by Thames & Hudson (2006) (German translation: Gleich und Anders – Eine Globale Geschichte der Homosexualität, Murmann Verlag) (2007) ISBN 978-0789315113
- The Age of Empires, published by Thames & Hudson (2007) ISBN 978-0500251362
- Gay Lives, published by Thames & Hudson (2012) (UK title, Gay Life Stories) ISBN 978-0500251904
