= George Clark (historian) =

British historian (1890–1979)

Sir George Clark
- Born: George Norman Clark; 27 February 1890; Halifax, West Yorkshire, England
- Died: 6 February 1979 (aged 88)
- Education: Balliol College, Oxford
- Awards: Fellow of the British Academy (1936); Knight Bachelor (1953)
- Scientific career
- Fields: History (Early Modern Europe)
- Workplaces: University of Oxford; University of Cambridge
- Military career
- Branch: British Army
- Service years: 1914–1919
- Rank: Captain
- Unit: Post Office Rifles
- Conflicts: World War I

Sir George Norman Clark, FBA (27 February 1890 – 6 February 1979) was an English historian, academic and British Army officer. He was the Chichele Professor of Economic History at the University of Oxford from 1931 to 1943 and the Regius Professor of Modern History at the University of Cambridge from 1943 to 1947. He served as the provost of Oriel College, Oxford, from 1947 to 1957.

== Early life and education ==
Clark was born on 27 February 1890 in Halifax, Yorkshire, England, to James Walker Clark and his wife Mary Clark (née Midgley). He was educated at Bootham School, a private boarding school in York, and at Manchester Grammar School, a grammar school in Manchester.

In 1908, he matriculated into Balliol College, Oxford, to study classics as a Brackenbury Scholar. In 1911, he achieved a first class in Literae Humaniores. He then changed to modern history and graduated in 1912 with a first class honours Bachelor of Arts (BA) degree. In 1912, he was elected to a prize fellowship at All Souls College, Oxford, and spent time abroad learning foreign languages.

== Career ==
=== Military service ===
Clark had been a member of the Officers' Training Corps attached to the University of Oxford during his studies. On 26 August 1914, he was commissioned into the Post Office Rifles, British Army, as a second lieutenant. On 27 May 1915, he was promoted to lieutenant. During the early part of World War I, he was wounded twice.

In May 1916, while fighting in the Battle of Vimy Ridge, he was taken prisoner by the Germans. At the time of his capture, he held the rank of captain. He was held in Gütersloh and Krefeld, and spent his time learning languages. He was also involved in writing plays for fellow prisoners to perform, one of which was performed postwar at the Haymarket Theatre, London. He was released at the end of hostilities and returned to Britain.

=== Academic career ===
Having been elected a Fellow of All Souls College, Oxford, in 1912, Clark's academic career truly started in 1919 when he was elected a Fellow and lecturer of Oriel College, Oxford. In 1930, he edited and provided a preface to the work Europe from 800 to 1789, the final and posthumous publication of historian H. W. C. Davis.

He became the inaugural Chichele Professor of Economic History at the University of Oxford in 1931 (with the accompanying Fellowship at All Souls), a post he held until 1943. From then until 1947 he was Regius Professor of Modern History at Cambridge University and a fellow of Trinity College, Cambridge. Between 1947 and 1957, he was Provost of Oriel College, Oxford.

Clark wrote a general introduction to the second edition of the Cambridge Modern History (1957), criticising the belief of some historians (in particular Lord Acton who had edited the first edition over half a century earlier) that eventually it would be possible to write an "ultimate history", rather they should expect their works to be built on and superseded by later historians. He stated that "knowledge of the past has come down through one or more human minds, has been processed by them, and therefore cannot consist of elemental and impersonal atoms which nothing can alter..."

Between the 1930s and 1960s, Clark was the editor overseeing the Oxford History of England series and wrote Volume X: The Later Stuarts, 1660–1714 (1934), which was the first of the series to be published. His The Seventeenth Century appeared in 1929, and he wrote numerous other monographs. He was twice editor of the English Historical Review.

George Clark delivered 1946 Walter Raleigh Lecture on History at the British Academy. He also delivered the Wiles Lectures in the Queen's University of Belfast in October 1956. They were published as War and Society in the Seventeenth Century (Cambridge UP, 1958).

== Honours ==
He was knighted in the 1953 Coronation Honours List. Clark was elected Fellow of the British Academy (FBA) in 1936. He was a Foreign Member of the American Academy of Arts and Sciences. In 1953 he was elected an honorary fellow of Trinity College Dublin.

Academic offices
Preceded by G. M. Trevelyan	Regius Professor of Modern History at the University of Cambridge; 1943–1947	Succeeded by J. R. M. Butler
