= Robert R. Locke =

American economist (1932–2024)

Robert R. Locke (February 19, 1932 – July 15, 2024) was an American educator, historian and economist, who was an emeritus professor of history, business and management at the University of Hawaii at Manoa.

== Life and career ==
Locke was born in Montebello, California on February 19, 1932. He received his PhD from University of California at Los Angeles in 1965 and was a Fulbright fellow in Germany and England. Locke died on July 15, 2024, at the age of 92.

== Books ==
- The Collapse of the American Management Mystique 1996
- Confronting Managerialism 2011
- Discovering Vera 2007
- The Entrepreneurial Shift: Americanization in European High-Technology Management Education 2004
- French Legitimists and the Politics of Moral Order in the Early Third Republic 2016
