= Linda Colley =

British historian and academic

Dame Linda Colley DBE FBA FRSL FRHistS
- Born: Linda Jane Colley; 13 September 1949 (age 77); Chester, Cheshire, England
- Spouse: Sir David Cannadine (m. 1982)
- Awards: Wolfson Prize (1992); Guggenheim Memorial Fellowship (2017); Howard T. Behrman Award for Distinguished Achievement in the Humanities (2025)

Academic work
- Discipline: History
- Sub-discipline: British History; World History; Constitutional History
- Institutions: Newnham College, Cambridge; Girton College, Cambridge; Christ's College, Cambridge; Yale University; London School of Economics; Princeton University
- Website: http://lindacolley.com/

Dame Linda Jane Colley (born 13 September 1949) is an expert on British, imperial and global history from 1700. She is currently Shelby M.C. Davis 1958 Professor of History at Princeton University. She previously held chairs at Yale University and at the London School of Economics. Her work frequently approaches the past from inter-disciplinary perspectives.

== Personal life ==
Colley is married to fellow historian Professor Sir David Cannadine.

== Early life and education ==
Colley took her first degree in history at Bristol University before completing a doctorate on the Tory Party in the eighteenth century at the University of Cambridge, supervised by John H. Plumb. She subsequently held a Research Fellowship at Girton College, a joint lectureship in history at Newnham and King's Colleges, and in 1979 was appointed the first woman Fellow at Christ's College, where she is now an Honorary Fellow.

== Academic career ==
Colley's first book, In Defiance of Oligarchy: The Tory Party 1714-1760 (1982), challenged the then dominant view by arguing that the Tory Party remained active and influential during its years out of power, exploring the consequences of this for the evolution of ideas, popular politics and political action in eighteenth century England and Wales. Britons: Forging the Nation 1707–1837 (1992), which won the Wolfson History Prize and has passed through five editions, investigated how – and how far – inhabitants of England, Scotland, and Wales came to see themselves as British over the course of the 18th and early 19th centuries.

From 1982 to 1997, Colley taught at Yale University, becoming Richard M. Colgate Professor of History and was ultimately offered a University Chair.

In 1998, she accepted a Senior Leverhulme Research Professorship in History at the London School of Economics. She spent the next five years researching the experiences of thousands of Britons taken captive in North America, South Asia, and the Mediterranean and North Africa between 1600 and 1850. Captives: Britain, Empire and the World 1600-1850 (2002), the result of this work, used captivity narratives of different kinds to investigate the under-belly and sporadic vulnerability of this empire and its makers.

She has also authored Namier (1988), a reappraisal of the Polish-born and Zionist historian Lewis Namier, and The Ordeal of Elizabeth Marsh: A Woman in World History. This was named as one of the best books of 2007 by The New York Times. In 2008-99, Colley guest-curated an exhibition at the British Library, London, Taking Liberties, on the meanings of constitutional texts in the British past, and published an interpretative essay in connection with this: Taking Stock of Taking Liberties: A Personal View (2008).

In 2014, and in advance of the referendum on Scottish independence, she was invited to deliver fifteen talks on BBC Radio 4 on the formation and fractures of the United Kingdom. These were published as Acts of Union and Disunion (2014). Her next book The Gun, the Ship, and the Pen: Warfare, Constitutions, and the Making of the Modern World, a global history that explores the relationship between warfare, crises and the spread of written constitutions, appeared in 2021. Her work has been translated into fifteen languages.

In 1999, Colley was invited to deliver the Prime Minister's Millennium Lecture at 10 Downing Street in London. Among other scholarly and public lectures, she has delivered the Trevelyan Lectures at Cambridge University, the Wiles Lectures at Queen's University Belfast, Ford and Bateman Lectures at Oxford University, the Nehru Memorial Lecture at the London School of Economics, the Lewis Walpole Memorial Lecture at Yale University, the Carnochan Lecture at Stanford University, the President's Lecture at Princeton University in 2007, the Sir Douglas Robb Lectures at the University of Auckland in New Zealand in 2015, the Prothero Lecture for the Royal Historical Society in 2020, and the Wittrock Lecture at the Swedish Collegium for Advanced Study in 2022, and the Clement and Carrie Chair Lecture at Tamkang University, Taiwan.

In 1999, Colley was elected a Fellow of the British Academy. She is also a Fellow of the American Academy of Arts and Sciences, the Royal Society of Literature, the Royal Historical Society, and the Academia Europaea. She has served on the board of the British Library (1999–2003), the council of Tate Gallery of British Art (1999-2003), the board and trustees of Princeton University Press (2007–2012), and the research committee of the British Museum (2012–2020).

== Books ==
- In Defiance of Oligarchy: The Tory Party 1714-1760 (1982)
- Britons: Forging the Nation 1707-1837 (1992)
- Captives: Britain, Empire and the World 1600-1850 (2002)
- The Ordeal of Elizabeth Marsh: A Woman in World History (2007)
- Taking Stock of Taking Liberties: A Personal View (2008)
- Acts of Union and Disunion (2014)
- The Gun, the Ship, and the Pen: Warfare, Constitutions, and the Making of the Modern World (2021)

== Honours ==
Colley was appointed Commander of the Order of the British Empire (CBE) in 2009 and Dame Commander of the Order of the British Empire (DBE) in the 2022 Birthday Honours for services to history.

- Howard T. Behrman Award for Distinguished Achievement in the Humanities (2025)
- Honorary Degree, University of Cambridge (2023)
- Honorary Fellowship, Girton College, Cambridge (2023)
- Honorary degree, University of Oxford (2021)
- Honorary degree DLitt, Queen's University Belfast (2019)Leaders from the world of business, science, sport, academia and the arts named Honorary Graduates
- John Simon Guggenheim Memorial Fellowship (2017)
- Senior Fellowship, Collegium of Advanced Study, Uppsala, Sweden (2017)
- Birkelund Fellowship, Cullman Center for Scholars and Writers, New York (2013)
- Honorary degree, University of Hull (2012)
- Fletcher Jones Distinguished Fellowship, Huntington Library, CA (2010)
- Fellow of Academia Europaea (2010)
- Honorary degree, University of Bristol (2006)
- Honorary degree, University of East Anglia (2005)
- Honorary Fellowship, Christ's College, Cambridge (2005)
- Visiting Fellowship, Humanities Research Centre, ANU, Canberra (2005)
- Glaxo-Smith-Kline Senior Fellowship, National Humanities Center, North Carolina (2005)
- Honorary degree, University of Essex (2004)
- Elected Fellow of the Royal Society of Literature (1999)
- Hooker Distinguished Visiting Professorship, McMaster University (1999)
- Elected Fellow of the British Academy (1999)
- Leverhulme Senior Personal Research Professorship (1998)
- Honorary degree, London Southbank University (1998)
- Wolfson Prize (1993)
- Fellow of the Royal Historical Society (1988)
- Morse Fellowship, Yale University (1983)
- Eugenie Strong Research Fellowship, Girton College, Cambridge (1975)
