= David Irving =

British author and Holocaust denier (born 1938)

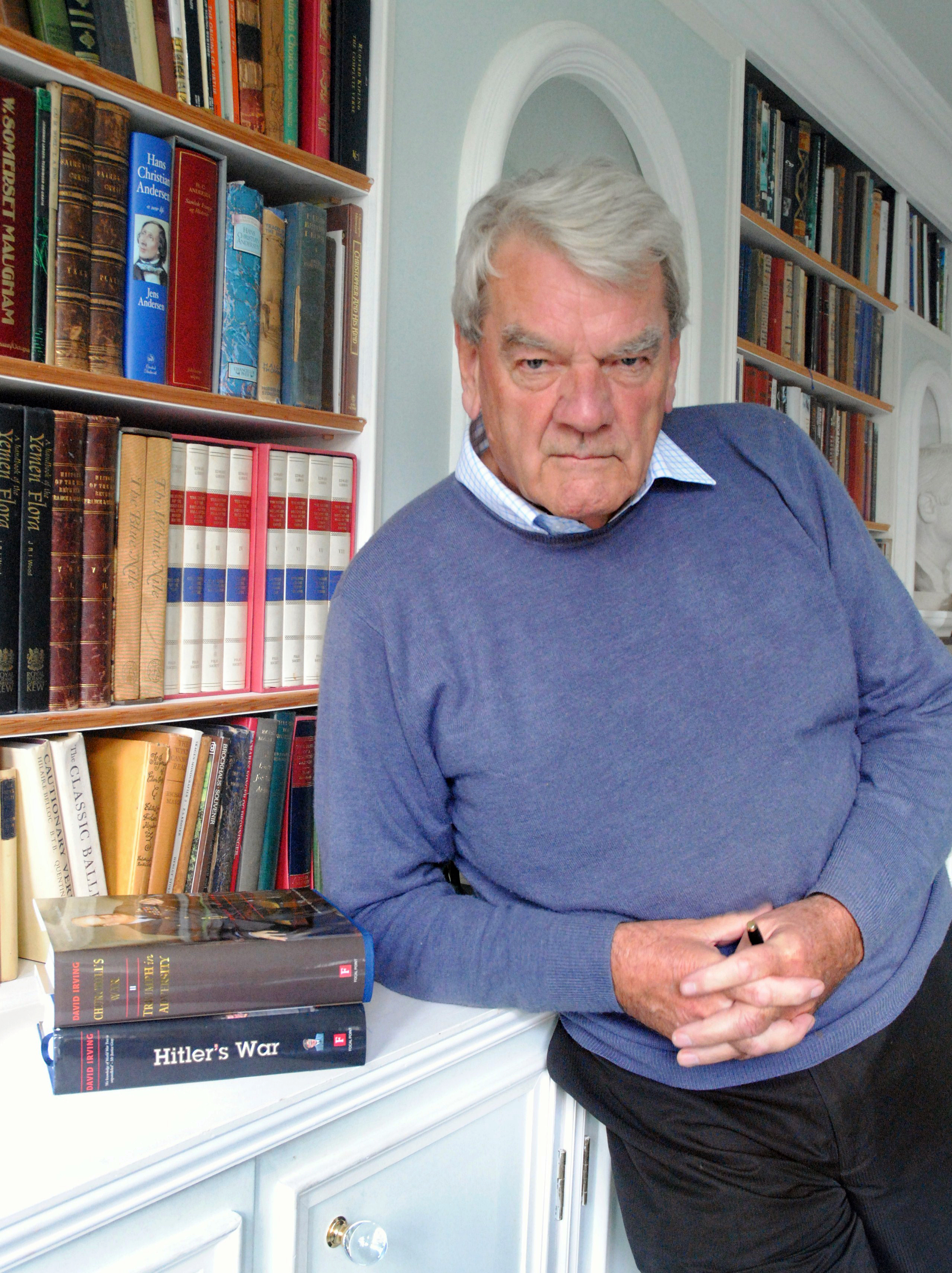
- Irving in 2012
- Born: David John Cawdell Irving; 24 March 1938 (age 88); Hutton, Essex, England
- Education: Brentwood School, Essex; Imperial College London; University College London
- Occupation: Author
- Spouse: María del Pilar Stuyck (m. 1961; div. 1981)
- Partner: Bente Hogh (since 1992)
- Children: 5
- Writing career
- Language: English; German
- Years active: 1962–2023
- Notable works: The Destruction of Dresden; The Mare's Nest; Hitler's War

David John Cawdell Irving (born 24 March 1938) is an English author who has written on the military and political history of the Second World War, especially Nazi Germany. He was found to be a Holocaust denier in a British court in 2000 as a result of a failed libel case.

Irving's works include The Destruction of Dresden (1963), Hitler's War (1977), Churchill's War (1987) and Goebbels: Mastermind of the Third Reich (1996). In his works, he falsely claimed that Adolf Hitler did not know of the extermination of Jews, or, if he did, he opposed it. Irving's negationist claims and views of German war crimes (and Hitler's responsibility for them) were denounced by historians.

Irving was once recognised for his knowledge of Nazi Germany and his ability to unearth new historical documents, which he held closely but stated were fully supportive of his conclusions. His 1964 book The Mare's Nest about Germany's V-weapons campaign of 1944–45 was praised for its deep research but criticised for minimising Nazi slave-labour programmes.

By the late 1980s, Irving had placed himself on the fringes of the study of history and had begun to turn to further extremes, possibly influenced by the 1988 trial of the Holocaust denier Ernst Zündel. That trial, and his reading of the pseudoscientific (Note: Leuchter Report dismissed as pseudoscientific: "Leuchter and Rudolf have published pseudoscientific reports purporting to show that chemical residues present in the gas chambers of Auschwitz-Birkenau are incompatible with homicidal gassings." Green, Richard J. "Leuchter, Rudolf, and the Iron Blues". Archived from the original on 17 May 2008.; "The Leuchter Report, a pseudo-scientific document which allegedly proves that Zyklon B was not used to exterminate human beings, was translated into Arabic and sold at the International Book Fair in Cairo in January 2001." Roth, Stephen (2002). Antisemitism Worldwide, 2000/1. University of Nebraska Press. p. 228.; "The turning point came in 1989, when Irving launched Fred Leuchter's pseudo-scientific Leuchter Report, which made the spurious claim that the absence of cyanide residues in the walls of the gas chambers at Auschwitz and other camps proved that they could not have functioned as mass extermination centres." Brinks, Jan Herman; Timms, Edward; Rock, Stella (2006). Nationalist Myths and Modern Media. I.B. Tauris. p. 72.; "The Leuchter report, was, indeed, an amateurish report produced by a man with no expertise, either historical or forensic." Hirsh, David (2003). Law Against Genocide. Routledge Cavendish. p. 134.; "Another common tactic of the deniers is to engage in historical inquiries that on the surface appear legitimate but upon close examination prove to be based on pseudo-science. One prominent example was the investigation of the Auschwitz gas chambers by Fred Leuchter [...] Detailed study of the 'Leuchter Report' revealed that it was based on erroneous assumptions (cyanide does not penetrate deeply into concrete). It also emerged that Leuchter had falsified his credentials and overstated his expertise. Despite this, his report is still cited by deniers." Cull, Nicholas John; Culbert, David Holbrook; Welch, David (2003). Propaganda and Mass Persuasion: A Historical Encyclopedia, 1500 to the Present. ABC-CLIO. p. 168.; "... the institute relied primarily on the talents of a California-based publicist named Bradley Smith who packaged and promoted Leuchter's discredited material as if it were the very essence of 'scientific research' or at least a tenable 'point of view', intrinsically worthy of inclusion in the academic agenda ..." Churchill, Ward (1997). A Little Matter of Genocide: Holocaust and Denial in the Americas, 1492 to the Present. City Lights Books. p. 24.; "After the trial, both Irving and Zündel published the results of Leuchter's trial research as The Leuchter Report: The End of a Myth, despite the fact that the court rejected both the report and Leuchter's testimony. ... The discredited report is popular in the Holocaust denial movement and one edition features a foreword by Irving." Gerstenfeld, Phyllis B.; Grant, Diana R. (2003). Crimes of Hate: Selected Readings. SAGE. p. 201.; "Leuchter's report contained a considerable amount of scientific, or, as it turned out, pseudo-scientific analysis of chemical residues on the gas chamber walls and similar matters. It was quickly discredited, not least on the basis of Leuchter's failure adequately to defend his findings on the witness stand." Evans, Richard J. "The 1991 Edition of Hitler's War". David Irving, Hitler and Holocaust Denial (electronic ed.). Section 3.3c, Paragraph 13. Archived from the original on 14 March 2016.) Leuchter report, led him openly to espouse Holocaust denial, specifically denying that Jews were murdered by gassing at Auschwitz concentration camp.

Irving's reputation as a historical author was further discredited (Note: Irving is discredited as a historian in a number of sources: "Conclusion on meaning 2.15 (vi): that Irving is discredited as a historian." David Irving v Penguin Books and Deborah Lipstadt [2000] EWHC QB 115 (11 April 2000).; "Deborah Lipstadt is Dorot Professor of Modern Jewish and Holocaust Studies and director of The Rabbi Donald A. Tam Institute for Jewish Studies at Emory University. She is the author of two books about the Holocaust. Her book Denying the Holocaust: The Growing Assault on Truth and Memory led to the 2000 court case in which she defeated and discredited Holocaust denier David Irving." "Task of Justice & Danger of Holocaust Deniers". Auschwitz: Inside the Nazi State – Understanding Auschwitz Today. PBS. Archived from the original on 19 October 2017.; "If the case for competence applies to those who lack specialist knowledge, it applies even further to those who have been discredited as incompetent. For example, why ought we include David Irving in a debate aiming to establish the truth about the Holocaust, after a court has found that he manipulates and misinterprets history?" Long, Graham (2004). Relativism and the Foundations of Liberalism. Imprint Academic. p. 80. ISBN 1-84540-004-6.; "[Irving] claimed that Lipstadt's book accuses him of falsifying historical facts in order to support his theory that the Holocaust never happened. This of course discredited his reputation as a historian ... On 11 April, High Court judge Charles Gray ruled against Irving, concluding that he indeed qualified as a Holocaust denier and anti-Semite and that as such he has distorted history in order to defend his hero, Adolf Hitler." Wyden 2001, p. 164.; "In Britain, which does not have a Holocaust denial law, Irving had already been thoroughly discredited when he unsuccessfully sued historian Deborah Lipstadt in 2000 for describing him as a Holocaust denier." Callamard, Agnès (April 2007). "Debate: can we say what we want?". Le Monde diplomatique.) in 2000, when, in the course of an unsuccessful libel case he filed against the American historian Deborah Lipstadt and Penguin Books, High Court Judge Charles Gray determined in his ruling that Irving wilfully misrepresented historical evidence to promote Holocaust denial and whitewash the Nazis, a view shared by many prominent historians. (Note: Shown to have misrepresented historical evidence: "In 1969, after David Irving's support for Rolf Hochhuth, the German playwright who accused Winston Churchill of murdering the Polish wartime leader General Sikorski, The Daily Telegraph issued a memo to all its correspondents. 'It is incorrect', it said, 'to describe David Irving as a historian. In future we should describe him as an author.'" Ingrams, Richard (25 February 2006). "Irving was the author of his own downfall". The Independent. London. Archived from the original on 20 December 2007.; "It may seem an absurd semantic dispute to deny the appellation of 'historian' to someone who has written two dozen books or more about historical subjects. But if we mean by historian someone who is concerned to discover the truth about the past, and to give as accurate a representation of it as possible, then Irving is not a historian. Those in the know, indeed, are accustomed to avoid the term altogether when referring to him and use some circumlocution such as 'historical writer' instead. Irving is essentially an ideologue who uses history for his own political purposes; he is not primarily concerned with discovering and interpreting what happened in the past, he is concerned merely to give a selective and tendentious account of it to further his own ideological ends in the present. The true historian's primary concern, however, is with the past. That is why, in the end, Irving is not a historian." Irving v Lipstadt and Irving v Penguin Books, expert witness report by Richard J. Evans FBA, Professor of Modern History, University of Cambridge, 2000, Chapter 6.; "State prosecutor Michael Klackl said: 'He's not a historian, he's a falsifier of history.'" Traynor, Ian (21 February 2006). "Irving jailed for denying Holocaust". The Guardian. London.; "Irving has never examined and interpreted facts for the simple reason that he is not a historian. He twists or suppresses evidence to fit a foregone conclusion—the opposite of what any reputable historian does." Taylor, Charles (24 May 2001). "Evil takes the stand". Salon. Archived from the original on 12 October 2007.; Hugh Trevor-Roper: "But I don't regard him as an historian. I don't think he has any historical sense. He is a propagandist who uses efficiently collected and arranged material to support a propagandist line." Cited in Evans 2002, p. 261; and Shermer, Michael (3 May 2005). "Enigma: The Faustian Bargain of David Irving". Skeptical Inquirer. Archived from the original on 19 October 2011.) The court found that Irving was an active Holocaust denier, antisemite and racist, who "for his own ideological reasons persistently and deliberately misrepresented and manipulated historical evidence". The court found that Irving's books had distorted the history of Hitler's role in the Holocaust to depict Hitler in a favourable light. He has been proven to make falsified claims using forged documents, has been forced to retract false accusations against individuals, has been fined for libellous claims and has had to pay court costs after failing to prove that others have made libellous claims against him. He has been denied entry to various countries, expelled from others, and was sentenced to three years' imprisonment in Austria in accordance with the law prohibiting Nazi activities.

== Early life ==
David John Cawdell Irving and his twin brother, Nicholas, were born in Hutton, Essex, on 24 March 1938, six months before the start of the undeclared German–Czechoslovak War, as Nazi Germany moved towards initiating the Second World War. The family lived in Hutton, near Brentwood, Essex. Irving had another brother, John, and a sister, Jennifer. His father, John James Cawdell Irving (1898–1967), was a career naval officer and a commander in the Royal Navy. His mother, Beryl Irving (née Newington), was an illustrator and a writer of children's books.

During the Second World War Irving's father was an officer aboard the light cruiser HMS Edinburgh. On 30 April 1942, while escorting Convoy QP 11 in the Barents Sea, the ship was badly damaged by the German submarine U-456. Two days later, the ship was attacked by the German destroyers Hermann Schoemann, Z24 and Z25, and now beyond recovery, was abandoned then scuttled by a torpedo from HMS Foresight. Irving's father survived but severed all links with his wife and children after the incident.

Irving described his childhood in an interview with the American writer Ron Rosenbaum: "Unlike the Americans, we English suffered great deprivations ... we went through childhood with no toys. We had no kind of childhood at all. We were living on an island that was crowded with other people's armies". According to his twin brother, Nicholas, David was a provocateur and prankster since his youth. He said that "David used to run toward bombed out houses shouting 'Heil Hitler!'", a statement which Irving denied. Irving also told Rosenbaum that he had held Holocaust-denialist views since childhood because of his objections to cartoon caricatures of Adolf Hitler and other Nazi leaders published in the British wartime press.

== Student years ==
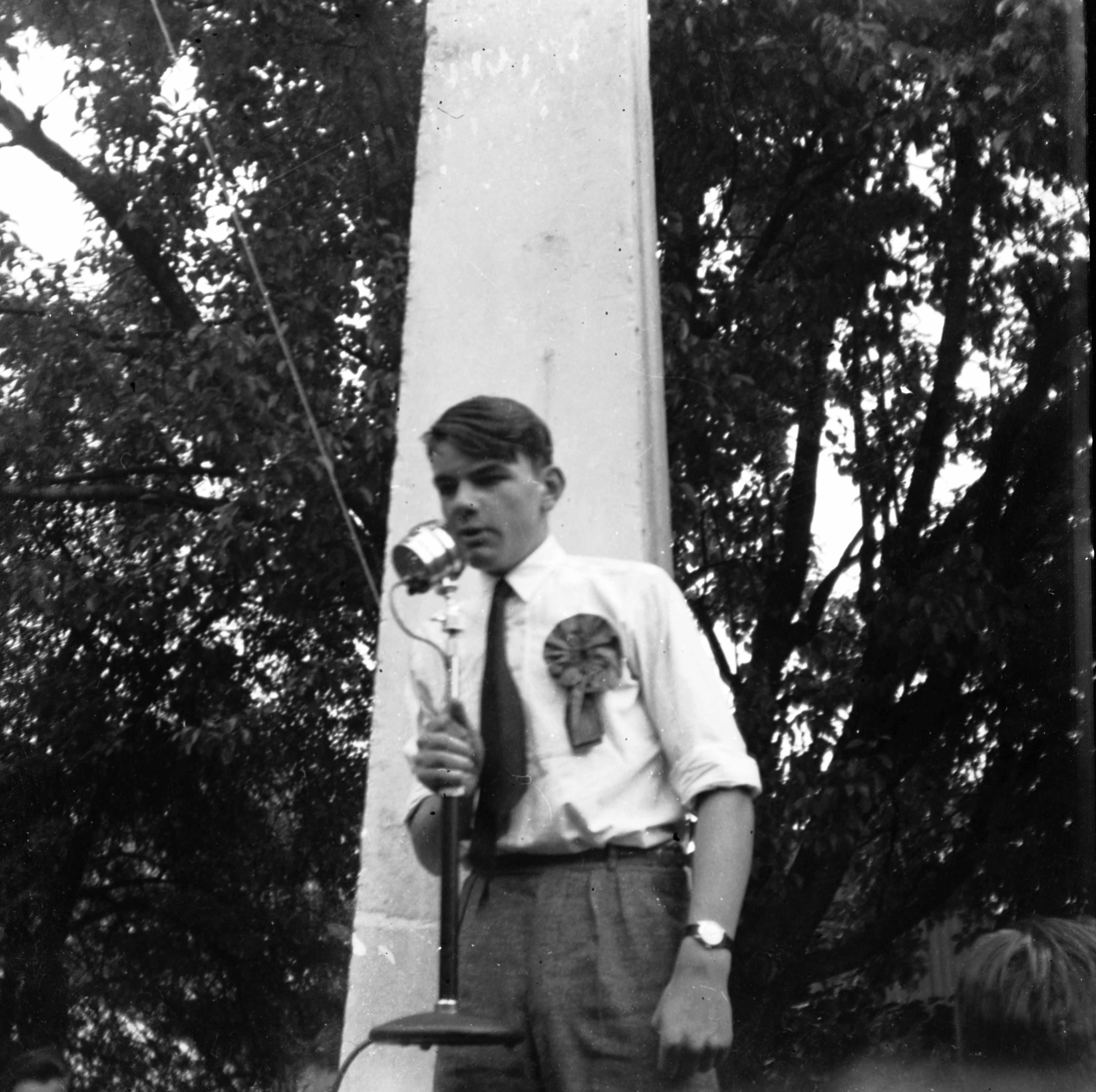
Irving in 1955

After completing his A-levels at Brentwood School, Irving studied for a physics degree at Imperial College London, leaving after the first year. He did not complete the course because of financial constraints. Irving later resumed his studies but had to drop out again for the same reason.

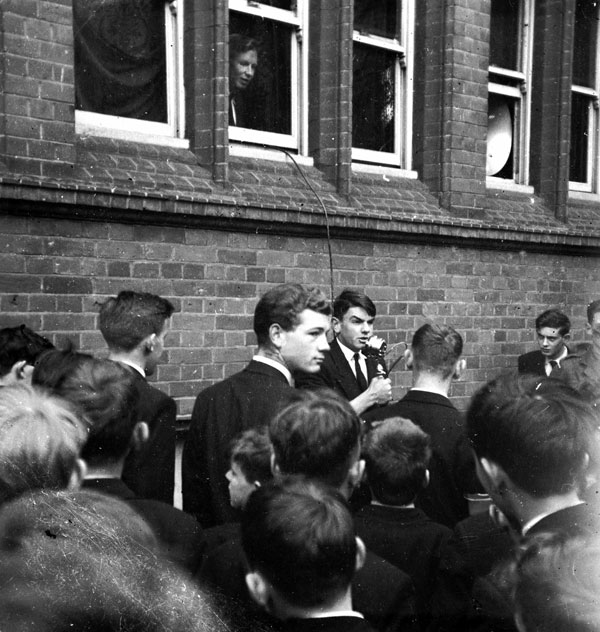
Irving speaking as the Labour Party candidate during a mock election at Brentwood School, May 1955

=== Carnival Times article ===
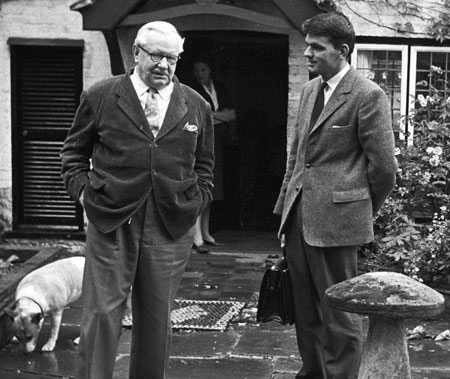
Irving with Arthur "Bomber" Harris in 1962

Irving's time as an editor of the Carnival Times, a student rag mag of the University of London Carnival Committee, became controversial in 1959 when he added a "secret supplement" to the magazine. This supplement contained an article in which he called Hitler the "greatest unifying force Europe has known since Charlemagne". Although Irving deflected criticism by characterising the Carnival Times as "satirical", he also stated that "the formation of a European Union is interpreted as building a group of superior peoples, and the Jews have always viewed with suspicion the emergence of any 'master-race' (other than their own, of course)". Opponents also viewed a cartoon included in the supplement as racist and criticised another article in which Irving wrote that the British press was owned by Jews. Volunteers were later recruited to remove and destroy the supplements before the magazine's distribution.

Irving later said that the criticism was "probably justifiable" and described his motivation in producing the controversial secret issue of Carnival Times as preventing the Carnival from making a profit that would be passed to a South African anti-apartheid group, which he considered a "subversive organisation".

== The Destruction of Dresden ==
Irving tried to join the Royal Air Force (RAF), but was deemed to be medically unfit.

After serving in 1959 as editor of the University of London Carnival Committee's journal, instead of doing national service, Irving left for West Germany, where he worked as a steelworker in a Thyssen AG steel works in the Ruhr area and learned German. He then moved to Spain, where he worked as a clerk at an air base.

By 1962, Irving was engaged to write a series of 37 articles on the Allied bombing campaign, Und Deutschlands Städte starben nicht ("And Germany's Cities Did Not Die"), for the German boulevard journal Neue Illustrierte. These were the basis for his first book, The Destruction of Dresden (1963), in which he examined the Allied bombing of Dresden in February 1945. By the 1960s, a debate about the morality of the carpet bombing of German cities and the civilian population had begun, especially in the United Kingdom. There was consequently considerable interest in Irving's book, which was illustrated with graphic pictures, and it became an international best-seller.

In the first edition, Irving's estimates for deaths in Dresden were between 100,000 and 250,000 – notably higher than most previously published figures. These figures became widely accepted in many standard reference works. In later editions of the book over the next three decades, he gradually adjusted the figure downwards to 50,000–100,000. According to the historian Richard J. Evans, at the 2000 libel trial that Irving brought against Deborah Lipstadt, Irving based his estimates of the dead of Dresden on the word of one individual who provided no supporting documentation, used a document forged by the Nazis, and described one witness who was a urologist as Dresden's Deputy Chief Medical Officer. The doctor later complained about being misidentified by Irving, and further, that he, the doctor, was only repeating rumours about the death toll. According to an investigation by Dresden City Council in 2008, casualties at Dresden were estimated as 22,700–25,000 dead.

Irving had based his numbers on what purported to be Tagesbefehl 47 ("Daily Order 47", TB 47), a document promulgated by Nazi Propaganda Minister Joseph Goebbels, and on claims made after the war by a former Dresden Nazi functionary, Hans Voigt, without verifying them against official sources available in Dresden. Irving's estimates and sources were first disputed by Walter Weidauer, Mayor of Dresden 1946–1958, in his own account of the Dresden bombing. When it was later confirmed that the TB 47 used was a forgery, Irving published a letter to the editor in The Times on 7 July 1966 retracting his estimates, writing that he had "no interest in promoting or perpetuating false legends". In 1977, the real document TB 47 was located in Dresden by Götz Bergander.

Despite acknowledging that the copy of "TB 47" he had used was inaccurate, Irving argued during the late 1980s and 1990s that the death toll at Dresden was much higher than the accepted estimates: in several speeches during this period, he said that 100,000 or more people had been killed in the bombing of Dresden. In some of the speeches, Irving also argued or implied that the raid was comparable to the Nazis' killing of Jews.

=== 1963 burglary of Irving's flat ===
In November 1963, Irving called the Metropolitan Police with suspicions he had been the victim of a burglary by three men who had gained access to his flat in Hornsey, London, by claiming to be engineers from the General Post Office. The anti-fascist activist Gerry Gable was convicted in January 1964, along with Manny Carpel. They were fined £20 each.

== Subsequent works ==
After the success of the Dresden book, Irving continued writing, including some works of negationist history, although his 1964 work The Mare's Nest – an account of the German V-weapons programme and the Allied intelligence countermeasures against it – was widely praised when published and continues to be well regarded. Michael J. Neufeld of the Smithsonian's National Air and Space Museum has described The Mare's Nest as "the most complete account on both Allied and German sides of the V-weapons campaign in the last two years of the war."

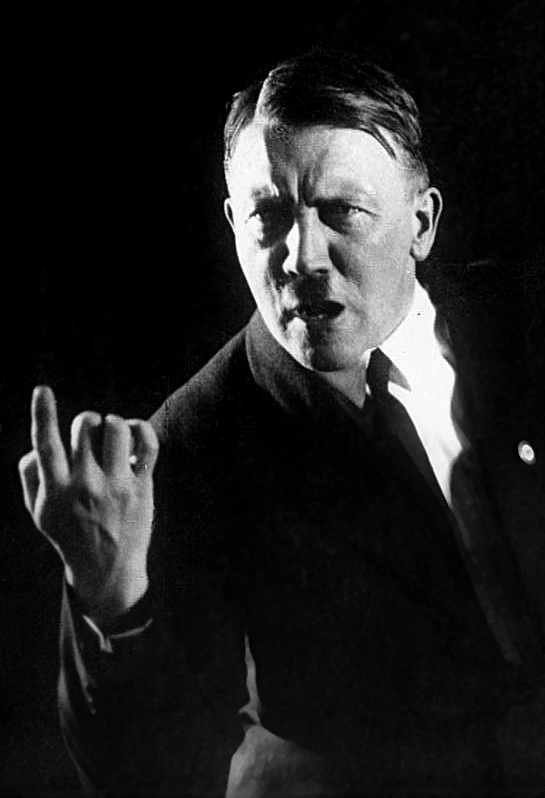
Irving once said he works to remove the "slime" applied to the reputation of Adolf Hitler (pictured).

Irving translated the Memoirs of Field Marshal Wilhelm Keitel in 1965 (edited by Walter Görlitz). In 1967, he published Accident: The Death of General Sikorski. In this book, Irving claimed that the plane crash which killed Polish government-in-exile leader General Władysław Sikorski in 1943 was really an assassination ordered by Winston Churchill. This view was criticised by Colin Smyth in his 1969 book The Assassination of Winston Churchill. Irving sued Smyth for libel but was unsuccessful and ordered to pay costs.

Also in 1967, Irving published two more works: The Virus House, an account of the German nuclear program during World War II, for which Irving conducted many interviews, and The Destruction of Convoy PQ-17. In the latter book he accused the British escort group commander Commander Jack Broome of cowardice in relation to the destruction of Convoy PQ 17. Broome sued Irving for libel in 1968. The High Court found in Broome's favour in 1970, with this ruling later being upheld by the House of Lords. Irving was forced to pay £40,000 in damages; this included £25,000 of exemplary damages which are only awarded when it is proven that the defendant deliberately committed a tort with the aim of making money.

After PQ-17, Irving largely shifted to writing biographies. In 1968, he published Breach of Security, an account of German reading of messages to and from the British Embassy in Berlin before 1939 with an introduction by the British historian Donald Cameron Watt. As a result of Irving's success with Dresden, members of Germany's extreme right wing assisted him in contacting surviving members of Hitler's inner circle. In an interview with the American journalist Ron Rosenbaum, Irving claimed to have developed sympathies towards them. Many ageing former mid- and high-ranked Nazis saw a potential friend in Irving and donated diaries and other material. Irving described his historical work to Rosenbaum as an act of "stone-cleaning" of Hitler, in which he cleared off the "slime" that he felt had been unjustly applied to Hitler's reputation.

In 1969, during a visit to Germany, Irving met Robert Kempner, one of the American prosecutors at the Nuremberg trials. Irving asked Kempner whether the "official record of the Nuremberg Trials was falsified", and told him that he was planning to go to Washington, D.C., to compare the sound recordings of Luftwaffe Field-Marshal Erhard Milch's March 1946 evidence with the subsequently published texts to find proof that evidence given at Nuremberg was "tampered with and manipulated". Upon his return to the United States, Kempner wrote to J. Edgar Hoover, the director of the Federal Bureau of Investigation, that Irving expressed many "anti-American and anti-Jewish statements".

In 1971, Irving translated the memoirs of General Reinhard Gehlen, and in 1973, published The Rise and Fall of the Luftwaffe, a biography of Field Marshal Milch. He spent the remainder of the 1970s working on Hitler's War and The War Path, his two-part biography of Adolf Hitler; The Trail of the Fox, a biography of Field Marshal Erwin Rommel; and a series in the Sunday Express describing the Royal Air Force's famous Dam Busters raid. In 1975, in his introduction to Hitler und seine Feldherren, the German edition of Hitler's War, Irving attacked Anne Frank's diary as a forgery, claiming falsely that a New York court had ruled that the diary was really the work of the American scriptwriter Meyer Levin "in collaboration with the girl's father". The publisher of Hitler und seine Feldherren was later required to pay damages in relation to this claim.

== Revisionism and denialism ==
=== Hitler's War ===
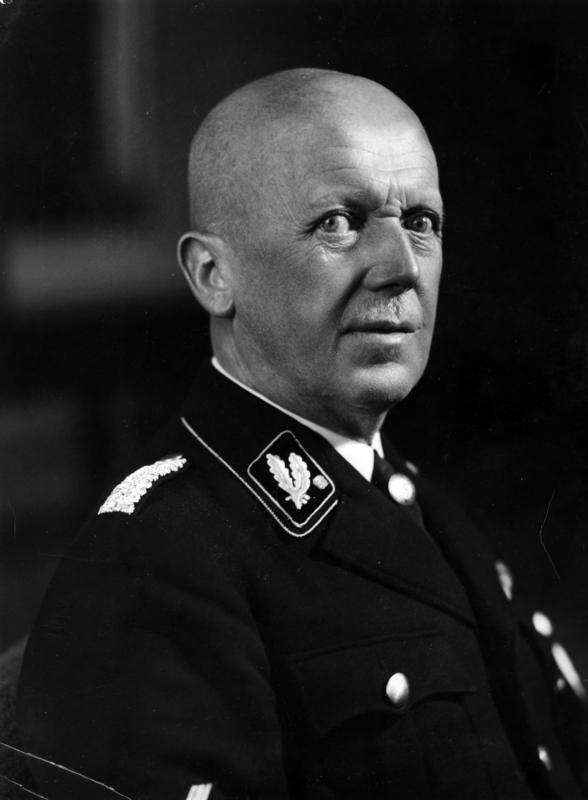
In Hitler's War, Irving used an undated memo written by Hans Lammers (pictured), the Chief of the Reich Chancellery, to the Justice Minister, saying: "The Führer has repeatedly pronounced that he wants the solution of the Jewish Question put off until after the war is over."

In 1977 Irving published Hitler's War, the first of his two-part biography of Adolf Hitler. Irving's intention in Hitler's War was to clean away the "years of grime and discoloration from the facade of a silent and forbidding monument" to reveal the real Hitler, whose reputation Irving argued had been slandered by historians. In Hitler's War, Irving tried to "view the situation as far as possible through Hitler's eyes, from behind his desk". He portrayed Hitler as a rational, intelligent politician, whose only goal was to increase Germany's prosperity and influence on the continent, and who was constantly let down by incompetent or treasonous subordinates. Irving's book faulted the Allied leaders, especially Winston Churchill, for the eventual escalation of war, and argued that the German invasion of the Soviet Union in 1941 was a "preventive war" forced on Hitler to avert an impending Soviet attack. Irving also argued that Hitler had no knowledge of the Holocaust: while not denying its occurrence, he argued that Heinrich Himmler, the Reichsführer of the Schutzstaffel (SS), and his deputy Reinhard Heydrich were its originators and architects. Irving made much of the lack of any known written order from Hitler ordering the Holocaust; he offered to pay £1,000 to anyone who could find such an order.

==== Reception ====
Critical reaction to Hitler's War was generally negative. Reviewers took issue with Irving's factual claims as well as his conclusions.

In Hitler's War, Irving quoted an undated memorandum by Hans Lammers, the Chief of the Reich Chancellery, to the Reich Justice Minister Franz Schlegelberger, saying: "the Führer has repeatedly pronounced that he wants the solution of the Jewish question put off until after the war is over". Irving took this as proof that Hitler ordered not to exterminate the Jews. Later, Irving falsely claimed that "no other historians have quoted this document, possibly finding its content hard to reconcile with their obsessively held views" about Hitler's responsibility for the Holocaust. However, the interpretation of the document is not as simple as Irving made it out to be in his book. The memorandum has no date and no signature, although historians estimate that it was issued at some point between 1941 and 1942 by looking at the other documents where the memorandum is located. They have concluded that the memorandum was more than likely from late 1941 when Hitler was still advocating the expulsion of the Jews, rather than later when he advocated their extermination.

The American historian Charles W. Sydnor Jr. noted numerous errors, such as Irving's incorrect statement that the Jews who fought in the Warsaw Ghetto Uprising of 1943 were well supplied with weapons from Germany's allies. Sydnor also pointed out that Hitler had received an SS report in November 1942 which contained a mention of 363,211 Russian Jews executed by the Einsatzgruppen between August and November 1942. Sydnor remarked that Irving's statement that the Einsatzgruppen were in charge in the death camps seemed to indicate that Irving was not even familiar with the history of the Holocaust, as the Einsatzgruppen were in fact mobile death squads who had nothing to do with the death camps.

Martin Broszat wrote that: "He [Irving] is too eager to accept authenticity for objectivity, is overly hasty in interpreting superficial diagnoses and often seems insufficiently interested in complex historical interconnections and in structural problems that transcend the mere recording of historical facts, but are essential for their evaluation". Broszat argued that in Hitler's War, Irving was too concerned with the "antechamber aspects" of Hitler's headquarters, and had distorted historical facts in Hitler's favor. Broszat also exposed factually incorrect interpretations by Irving, such as accepting at face value the Nazi claim that the T4 "euthanasia" program was launched in September 1939 to free up hospital spaces for wounded German soldiers, when in fact, the Action T4 program was launched in January 1939. In particular, Broszat criticised Irving's claim that a single note written by Himmler, supposedly transcribing a telephone call from Hitler, stating "No liquidation" (with respect to a train convey of German Jews, passing through Berlin to Riga on November 30, 1941) was sufficient proof to establish that Hitler did not want the Holocaust to happen.

=== Late 1970s and early 1980s work ===
Months after the release of Hitler's War, Irving published The Trail of the Fox, a biography of Generalfeldmarschall Erwin Rommel. In it Irving attacked the members of the 20 July plot to assassinate Hitler in 1944, branding them "traitors", "cowards", and "manipulators", and uncritically presented Hitler and his government's subsequent revenge against the plotters, of which Rommel was also a victim. In particular, Irving accused Rommel's friend and Chief of Staff General Hans Speidel of framing Rommel in the attempted coup. The British historian David Pryce-Jones, in a book review of The Trail of the Fox in the edition of 12 November 1977 of The New York Times Book Review, accused Irving of taking everything Hitler had to say at face value.

In 1978, Irving released The War Path, the companion volume to Hitler's War which covered events leading up to the war and which was written from a similar point of view. Again, professional historians such as Donald Cameron Watt noted numerous inaccuracies and misrepresentations. Despite the criticism, the book sold well, as did all of Irving's books up to that date. The success of his books enabled Irving to buy a home in the prestigious Mayfair district of London, own a Rolls-Royce car and enjoy an affluent lifestyle. In addition, Irving, despite being married, became increasingly open about his affairs with other women, all of which were detailed in his self-published diary. Guttenplan 2001, p. 51. Irving's first marriage ended in divorce in 1981.

In the 1980s, Irving started researching and writing about topics other than Nazi Germany, but with less success. He began his research on his three-part biography of Winston Churchill. After publication, Irving's work on Churchill received at least one bad review from Professor David Cannadine (then of the University of London):

It has received almost no attention from historians or reviewers ... It is easy to see why ... full of excesses, inconsistencies and omissions ... seems completely unaware of recent work done on the subject ... It is not merely that the arguments in this book are so perversely tendentious and irresponsibly sensationalist. It is also that it is written in a tone which is at best casually journalistic and at worst quite exceptionally offensive. The text is littered with errors from beginning to end.

In 1981, he published two books. The first was The War Between the Generals, in which Irving offered an account of the Allied High Command on the Western Front in 1944–45, detailing the heated conflicts Irving alleges occurred between the various generals of the various countries and presenting rumours about their private lives. The second book was Uprising!, about the 1956 revolt in Hungary, which Irving characterised as "primarily an anti-Jewish uprising", supposedly because the Communist regime was itself controlled by Jews. Irving's depiction of Hungary's Communist regime as a Jewish dictatorship oppressing Gentiles sparked charges of antisemitism. In addition, there were complaints that Irving had grossly exaggerated the number of people of Jewish origin in the Communist regime and had ignored the fact that Hungarian Communists who did have a Jewish background, like Mátyás Rákosi and Ernő Gerő, had totally repudiated Judaism and sometimes expressed antisemitic attitudes themselves. Critics such as Neal Ascherson and Kai Bird took issue with some of Irving's language that seemed to evoke antisemitic imagery, such as his remark that Rákosi possessed "the tact of a kosher butcher".

In 1982, Irving described himself as an "untrained historian" and argued that his lack of academic qualifications did not mean that he could not be considered a historian. He listed Pliny the Elder and Tacitus as examples of historians without university training.

=== Hitler Diaries ===
In 1983 Stern, a weekly German news magazine, purchased 61 volumes of Hitler's supposed diaries for DM 9 million and published excerpts from them. Irving played a major role in exposing the Hitler Diaries as a hoax. In October 1982, Irving had purchased, from the same source as Stern's 1983 purchase, 800 pages of documents relating to Hitler, only to conclude that many of the documents were forgeries. Irving was amongst the first to identify the diaries as forgeries and to draw media attention. He went so far as to crash the press conference held by Hugh Trevor-Roper at the magazine's offices in Hamburg on 25 April 1983 to denounce the diaries as a forgery and Trevor-Roper for endorsing the diaries as genuine. Irving's performance at the Stern press conference, where he violently harangued Trevor-Roper until ejected by security led him to be featured prominently on the news: the next day, Irving appeared on the Today television show as a featured guest. Irving had concluded that the alleged Hitler diaries were a forgery because they had come from the same dealer in Nazi memorabilia from whom Irving had purchased his collection in 1982. At the press conference in Hamburg, Irving said, "I know the collection from which these diaries come. It is an old collection, full of forgeries. I have some here". Irving was proud to have detected and denounced the hoax material and of the "trail of chaos" he had created at the Hamburg press conference and the attendant publicity it had brought him, and took pride in his humiliation of Trevor-Roper, whom Irving strongly disliked for his "sloppy" work, in not detecting the hoax, and past criticism of Irving's methods and conclusions. Irving also noted internal inconsistencies in the supposed Hitler diaries, such as a diary entry for 20 July 1944, which would have been unlikely given that Hitler's right hand had been badly burned by the bomb planted in his headquarters by Colonel Claus von Stauffenberg earlier that day.

A week later, on 2 May, Irving asserted that many of the diary documents appeared to be genuine: at the same press conference, Irving took the opportunity to promote his translation of the memoirs of Hitler's physician Theodor Morell. Robert Harris, in his book Selling Hitler, suggested that an additional reason for Irving's change of mind over the authenticity of the alleged Hitler diaries was that the fake diaries contain no reference to the Holocaust, thereby buttressing Irving's claim in Hitler's War that Hitler had no knowledge of it. Subsequently, Irving conformed when the diaries were declared a forgery by consensus. At a press conference held to withdraw his endorsement of the diaries, Irving proudly claimed that he was the first to call them a forgery, to which a reporter replied that he was also the last to call them genuine.

=== Other books ===
By the mid-1980s Irving had not had a successful book for some years and was behind schedule in writing the first volume of his Churchill series, the research for which had strained his finances. The book was published in 1987 as Churchill's War, The Struggle for Power.

In 1989, Irving published his biography of Hermann Göring.

== Holocaust denial ==
=== Movement towards Holocaust denial ===
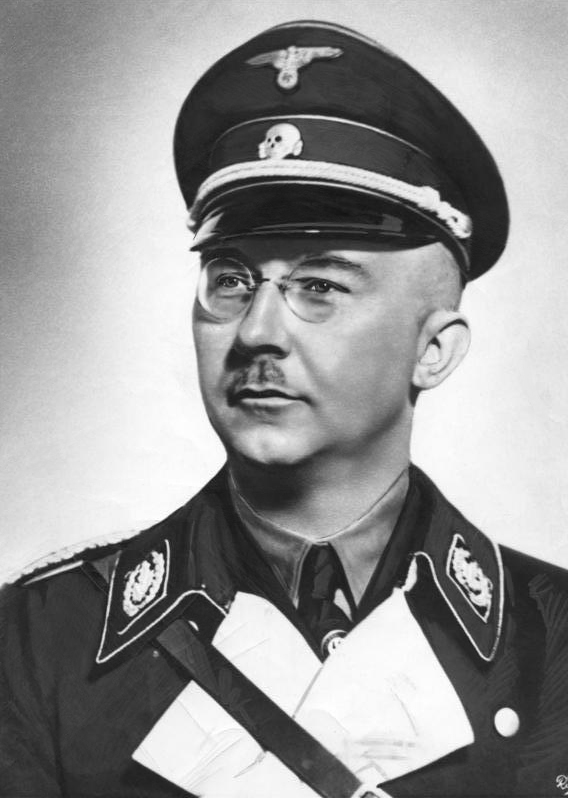
A note in Reichsführer-SS Heinrich Himmler's telephone log on 30 November 1941 stating "no liquidation" was later used by Irving as his central argument in trying to prove that Hitler was ignorant of the Holocaust.

Over the years, Irving's stance on the Holocaust changed. Since the late 1970s, he has either questioned or denied Hitler's involvement in the Holocaust and whether or not the Nazis had a plan to exterminate the Jews of Europe.

Irving always denied Hitler was antisemitic, even before he openly denied the Holocaust. Irving claimed Hitler only used antisemitism as a political platform, and that after he came to power in 1933 he lost interest in it, while Joseph Goebbels and other Nazis continued to espouse antisemitism. In 1977 on a BBC1 television programme, he said that Hitler "became a statesman and then a soldier ... and the Jewish problem was a nuisance to him, an embarrassment." In 1983, Irving summarised his views about Hitler and the Jews when he said that "probably the biggest friend the Jews had in the Third Reich, certainly when the war broke out, was Adolf Hitler. He was the one who was doing everything he could to prevent things nasty happening to them." In the same year, he further declared about Hitler and the mass killing of Jews, "There is a whole chain of evidence from 1938 right through to October 1943, possibly even later, indicating that Hitler was completely in the dark about anything that may have been going on." Irving boasted that he had not been disproved.

In his first edition of Hitler's War in 1977, Irving argued that Hitler was against the killings of the Jews in the East. He claimed that Hitler even ordered a stop to the extermination of Jews in November 1941; the British historian Hugh Trevor-Roper noted that this admission blatantly contradicted Irving's claim that Hitler was ignorant about what was happening to Jews in Eastern Europe. On 30 November 1941, Heinrich Himmler went to the Wolf's Lair for a private conference with Hitler and during it the fate of some Berlin Jews was mentioned. At 1.30 pm, Himmler was instructed to tell Reinhard Heydrich that the Jews were not to be liquidated. Irving falsely claimed that Himmler telephoned SS General Oswald Pohl, the overall chief of the concentration camp system, with the order: "Jews are to stay where they are" (Himmler actually referred to "administrative leaders of the SS" needing to stay where they were). Irving argued that "No liquidation" (Keine Liquidierung) was "incontrovertible evidence" that Hitler ordered that no Jews were to be killed. However, although the telephone log is genuine, it provides no evidence that Hitler was involved at all, only that Himmler contacted Heydrich and there is no evidence that Hitler and Himmler were in contact before the phone call. This is an example of Irving's manipulation of documents since there was no general order to stop the killing of Jews. The historian Eberhard Jäckel wrote that Irving "only ever sees and collects what fits his story, and even now he will not let himself be dissuaded from understanding what he wants to by the phrase 'postponement of the Jewish question'."

In June 1977, the British television host David Frost aired a debate, during which Irving argued that there was no evidence Hitler even knew about the Holocaust. Frost asked Irving whether or not he thought Hitler was evil, he replied, "He was as evil as Churchill, as evil as Roosevelt, as evil as Truman".

=== Increasingly public Holocaust denial ===
From 1988 Irving started to espouse Holocaust denial openly: he had previously not denied the Holocaust outright, and for this reason many Holocaust deniers were ambivalent about him. They admired Irving for the pro-Nazi slant in his work and the fact that he possessed a degree of mainstream credibility that they lacked, but were annoyed that he did not openly deny the Holocaust. In 1980 Lucy Dawidowicz noted that, although Hitler's War was strongly sympathetic to the Third Reich, because Irving argued that Hitler was unaware of the Holocaust as opposed to denying the Holocaust happened at all, his book was not part of the "anti-Semitic canon". In 1980 Irving received an invitation to speak at a Holocaust-denial conference, which he refused on the grounds that his appearance there would damage his reputation. In a letter Irving stated his reasons for his refusal as: "This is pure Realpolitik on my part. I am already dangerously exposed, and I cannot take the chance of being caught in flak meant for others!" Though Irving refused at this time to appear at conferences sponsored by the Holocaust-denying Institute for Historical Review (IHR), he did grant the institute the right to distribute his books in the United States. Robert Jan van Pelt suggests that the major reason for Irving wishing to keep his distance from Holocaust deniers in the early 1980s was his desire to found his own political party called Focus.

In a footnote in the first edition of Hitler's War, Irving writes, "I cannot accept the view ... [that] there exists no document signed by Hitler, Himmler or Heydrich speaking of the extermination of the Jews". In 1982 Irving temporarily stopped writing and made an attempt to unify all of the various far-right splinter groups in Britain into one party called Focus, in which he would play a leading role. Irving described himself as a "moderate fascist" and spoke of plans to become Prime Minister of the United Kingdom, but his efforts to move into politics, which he regarded at the time as very important, failed due to fiscal problems. Irving told the Oxford Mail of having "links at a low level" with the National Front (NF). Irving described The Spotlight, the main journal of the Liberty Lobby, as "an excellent fortnightly paper". At the same time, Irving put a copy of Hitler's "Prophecy Speech" of 30 January 1939, promising the "annihilation of the Jewish race in Europe" if "Jewish financiers" started another world war, onto his wall.

Following the failure of Focus, in September 1983, Irving for the first time attended a conference of the IHR. Van Pelt has argued that, with the failure of Irving's political career, he felt freer to associate with Holocaust deniers. At the conference, Irving did not deny the Holocaust, but did appear happy to share the stage with Robert Faurisson and Judge Wilhelm Stäglich, and claimed to be impressed with the pseudoscientific allegations of the neo-Nazi and Holocaust denier Friedrich "Fritz" Berg that mass murder using diesel gas fumes at the Operation Reinhard death camps was impossible. At that conference, Irving repeated his claims that Hitler was ignorant of the Holocaust because he was "so busy being a soldier". In a speech at that conference, Irving stated: "Isn't it right for Tel Aviv to claim now that David Irving is talking nonsense and of course Adolf Hitler must have known about what was going in Auschwitz and Treblinka, and then in the same breath to claim that, of course our beloved Mr. Begin didn't know what was going on in Sabra and Chatilla". During the same speech, Irving proclaimed Hitler to be the "biggest friend the Jews had in the Third Reich". In the same speech, Irving stated that he operated in such a way as to bring himself maximum publicity. Irving stated that: "I have at home... a filing cabinet full of documents which I don't issue all at once. I keep them: I issue them a bit at a time. When I think my name hasn't been in the newspapers for several weeks, well, then I ring them up and I phone them and I say: 'What about this one, then?'"

A major theme of Irving's writings from the 1980s was his belief that it had been a great blunder on the part of Britain to declare war on Germany in 1939, and that ever since then and as a result of that decision, Britain had slipped into an unstoppable decline. Irving also took the view that Hitler often tried to help the Jews of Europe. In a June 1992 interview with The Daily Telegraph, Irving claimed to have heard from Hitler's naval adjutant that the Führer had told him that he could not marry because Germany was "his bride". Irving then claimed to have asked the naval adjutant when Hitler made that remark, and upon hearing that the date was 24 March 1938, Irving stated in response "Herr Admiral, at that moment I was being born". Irving used this alleged incident to argue that there was some sort of mystical connection between himself and Hitler.

In a 1986 speech in Australia, Irving argued that photographs of Holocaust survivors and dead taken in early 1945 by Allied soldiers were proof that the Allies were responsible for the Holocaust, not the Germans. Irving claimed that the Holocaust was not the work of Nazi leaders, but rather of "nameless criminals", and claimed that "these men [who killed the Jews] acted on their own impulse, their own initiative, within the general atmosphere of brutality created by the Second World War, in which of course Allied bombings played a part." In another 1986 speech, this time in Atlanta, Irving claimed that "historians have a blindness when it comes to the Holocaust because like Tay–Sachs disease it is a Jewish disease which causes blindness".

By the mid-1980s Irving associated himself with the IHR, began giving lectures to groups such as the far-right German Deutsche Volksunion (DVU), and publicly denied that the Nazis systematically exterminated Jews in gas chambers during World War II. Irving in his revised edition of Hitler's War in 1991 removed all mentions of "gas chambers" and the word "Holocaust". He defended the revisions by stating, "You won't find the Holocaust mentioned in one line, not even in a footnote, why should [you]. If something didn't happen, then you don't even dignify it with a footnote."

Irving was present at a memorial service for Hans-Ulrich Rudel in January 1983 after the latter's death, organised by the DVU and its leader Gerhard Frey, delivering a speech, and was given the Hans-Ulrich-Rudel-Award by Frey in June 1985. Irving was a frequent speaker for the DVU in the 1980s and the early 1990s, but the relationship ended in 1993 apparently because of concerns by the DVU that Irving's espousal of Holocaust denial might lead to the DVU being banned.

In 1986, Irving visited Toronto, where he was met at an airport by the Holocaust denier Ernst Zündel. According to Zündel, Irving "thought I was 'Revisionist-Neo-Nazi-Rambo-Kook!'", and asked Zündel to stay away from him. Zündel and his supporters obliged Irving by staying away from his lecture tour, which consequently attracted little media attention, and was considered by Irving to be a failure. Afterwards, Zündel sent Irving a long letter in which he offered to draw publicity to Irving, and so ensure that his future speaking tours would be a success. As a result, Irving and Zündel became friends, and Irving agreed in late 1987 to testify for Zündel at his second trial for denying the Holocaust. In the 1987 book Der europäische Bürgerkrieg 1917–1945, Ernst Nolte encouraged Irving to become more open in associating with Zündel.

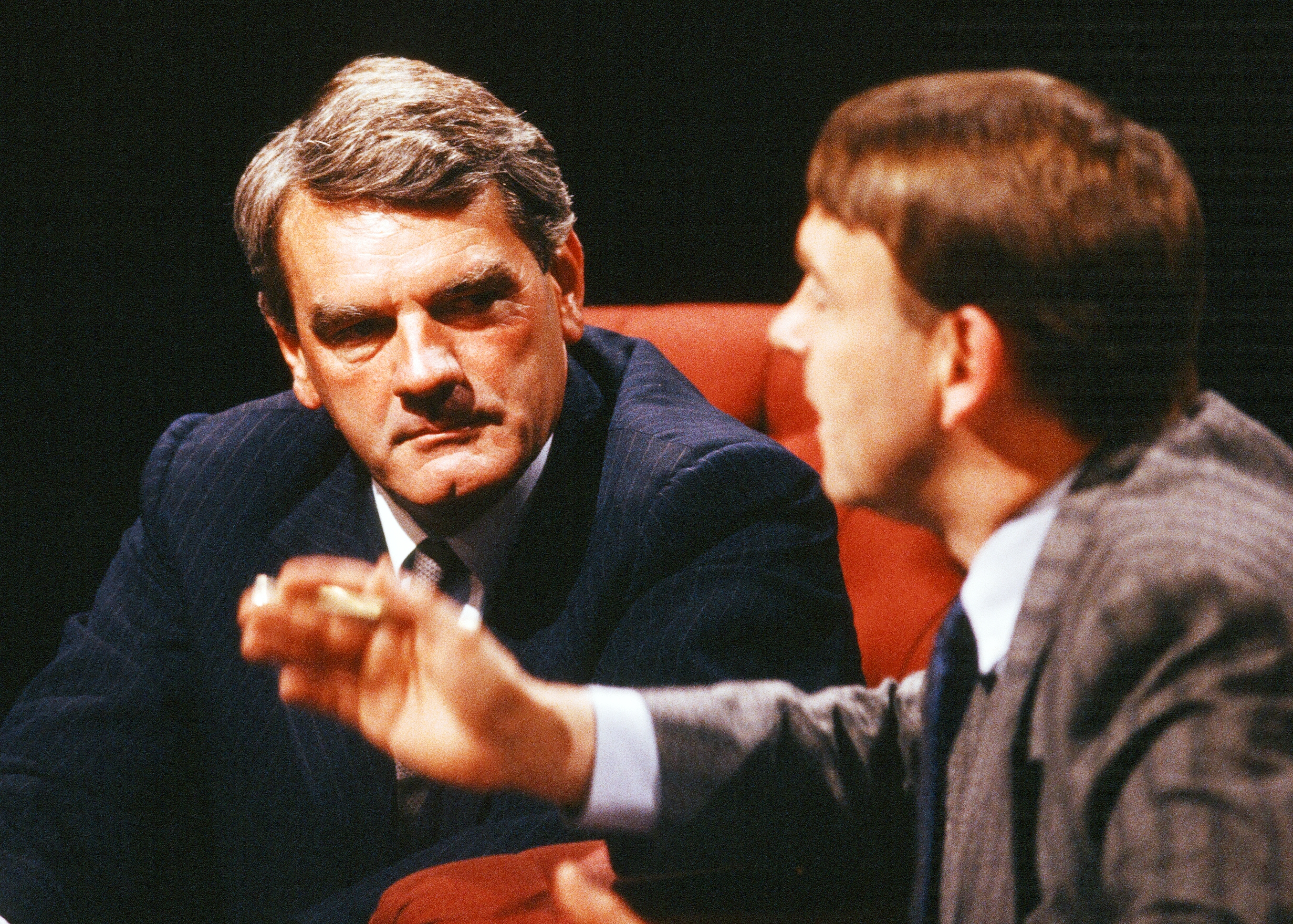
Irving on After Dark in 1988, discussing Winston Churchill

In 1988 Irving argued that the Nazi state was not responsible for the extermination of the Jews in places like Minsk, Kiev and Riga because according to him they were carried out for the most part by "individual gangsters and criminals".

In 1989 Irving during a speech told an audience that "there is not one shower bath in any of the concentration or slave labour camps that turns out to have been some kind of gas chamber." He described Jewish Holocaust survivors as "liars, psychiatric cases and extortionists." In 1990, Irving said on 5 March that there were no gas chambers at Auschwitz and that "30,000 people at the most were murdered in Auschwitz ... that's about as many as we Englishmen killed in a single night in Hamburg." He reiterated his claim that there were no gas chambers at Auschwitz on 5 March 1990 to an audience in Germany:

There were no gas chambers in Auschwitz, there were only dummies which were built by the Poles in the postwar years, just as the Americans build the dummies in Dachau ... these things in Auschwitz, and probably also in Majdanek, Treblinka, and in other so-called extermination camps in the East are all just dummies.

During the same speech, he said, "I and, increasingly, other historians ... are saying, the Holocaust, the gas chamber establishments in Auschwitz did not exist." Later on in the same year, Irving told an audience in Toronto, "The gas chambers that are shown to the tourists in Auschwitz are fakes."

Irving denied that the Nazis gassed any Jews or other people, with the exception of admitting that a small number of people were gassed during experiments.

=== 1990s ===
In 1990, Irving told an audience in Canada that "particularly when there's money involved and they can get a good compensation cash payment out of it" there would be people claiming to be eyewitnesses to gas chambers or extermination camps. He continued:

And the only way to overcome this appalling pseudo-religious atmosphere that surrounds the whole of this immense tragedy called World War II is to treat these little legends with the ridicule and bad taste that they deserve. Ridicule isn't enough, you've got to be tasteless about it. You've got to say things: "More women died on the back seat of Senator Edward Kennedy's car at Chappaquiddick than died in the gas chamber at Auschwitz." You think that's tasteless? What about this: I'm forming an association especially dedicated to all these liars, the ones who try to kid people that they were in these concentration camps. It's called "The Auschwitz Survivors, Survivors of the Holocaust, and Other Lies" – "A.S.S.H.O.L.E.S." Can't get more tasteless than that. But you've got to be tasteless because these people deserve all our contempt, and in fact they deserve the contempt of the real Jewish community and the people, whatever their class and colour, who did suffer.

In 1991, Irving espoused an antisemitic conspiracy theory when he stated that the Jews "dragged us into two world wars and now, for equally mysterious reasons, they're trying to drag us into the Balkans."

In 1995, when Irving was confronted with a Holocaust survivor, he repeated the same claim and asked, "How much money have you made from that piece of ink on your arm, which may indeed be real tattooed ink? Yes. Half a million dollars, three-quarters of a million for you alone?" On 6 October 1995 Irving told an audience in Tampa, Florida, that he agreed with Goebbels that the Jews "had it coming for them".

=== Ernst Zündel trial ===
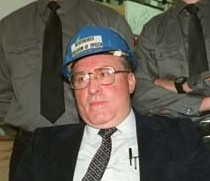
Ernst Zündel, whom Irving met in 1986 and became good friends with and collaborated with to distribute Holocaust denial

In January 1988 Irving travelled to Toronto, Ontario, to assist Douglas Christie, the defence lawyer for Zündel at his second trial for denying the Holocaust. Working closely with Robert Faurisson, who was also assisting the defence, Irving contacted Warden Bill Armontrout of Missouri State Penitentiary, who recommended that Irving and Faurisson should get into touch with Fred A. Leuchter, a self-described execution expert living in Boston. Irving and Faurisson then flew to Boston to meet with Leuchter, who agreed to lend his alleged technical expertise on the behalf of Zündel's defence. Irving argued that an alleged expert on gassings like Leuchter could prove that the Holocaust was a "myth". After work on the second Zündel trial, Irving declared that based on his exposure to Zündel's and Leuchter's theories that he was now conducting a "one-man intifada" against the idea that there had been a Holocaust. Subsequently, Irving claimed to the American journalist D. D. Guttenplan in a 1999 interview that Zündel had convinced him that the Holocaust had not occurred.

Between 22 and 26 April 1988, Irving testified for Zündel, endorsing Richard Harwood's book Did Six Million Really Die? as "over ninety percent ... factually accurate".

As to what evidence further led Irving to believe that the Holocaust never occurred, he cited The Leuchter report by Leuchter, which claimed there was no evidence for the existence of homicidal gas chambers at the Auschwitz concentration camp. Irving said in a 1999 documentary about Leuchter: "The big point [of the Leuchter report]: there is no significant residue of cyanide in the brickwork. That's what converted me. When I read that in the report in the courtroom in Toronto, I became a hard-core disbeliever". In addition, Irving was influenced to embrace Holocaust denial by the American historian Arno J. Mayer's 1988 book Why Did the Heavens Not Darken?, which did not deny the Holocaust, but claimed that most of those who died at Auschwitz were killed by disease: Irving saw in Mayer's book an apparent confirmation of Leuchter's and Zündel's theories about no mass murder at Auschwitz.

After the trial Irving published Leuchter's report as Auschwitz, The End of the Line: The Leuchter Report in the United Kingdom in 1989 and wrote its foreword. Leuchter's book had been first published in Canada by Zündel's Samisdat Publishers in 1988 as The Leuchter Report: The End of a Myth: An Engineering Report on the Alleged Execution Gas Chambers at Auschwitz, Birkenau and Majdanek. In his foreword to the British edition of Leuchter's book, Irving wrote that "Nobody likes to be swindled, still less where considerable sums of money are involved". The alleged swindle was the reparations money totalling 3 billion DM paid by the Federal Republic of Germany to Israel between 1952 and 1966 for the Holocaust. In his foreword, Irving praised the "scrupulous methods" and "integrity" of Leuchter.

For publishing and writing the foreword to Auschwitz The End of the Line, on 20 June 1989, Irving together with Leuchter was condemned in an Early Day Motion of the House of Commons as "Hitler's heirs". The motion went on to describe Irving as a "Nazi propagandist and longtime Hitler apologist" and Auschwitz The End of the Line as a "fascist publication". In the Motion, the House stated that they were "appalled by [the Holocaust denial of] Nazi propagandist and long-time Hitler apologist David Irving". In response to the motion, Irving in a press statement challenged the MPs who voted to condemn him, writing that: "I will enter the 'gas chambers' of Auschwitz and you and your friends may lob in Zyklon B in accordance with the well known procedures and conditions. I guarantee that you won't be satisfied with the results!"

In a pamphlet Irving published in London on 23 June 1989, he made the "epochal announcement" that there was no mass murder in the gas chambers at the Auschwitz death camp. Irving labelled the gas chambers at Auschwitz a "hoax", and writing in the third person declared that he "has placed himself [Irving] at the head of a growing band of historians, worldwide, who are now sceptical of the claim that at Auschwitz and other camps were 'factories of death', in which millions of innocent people were systematically gassed to death". Boasting of his role in criticising the Hitler diaries as a forgery in 1983, Irving wrote "now he [Irving] is saying the same thing about the infamous 'gas chambers' of Auschwitz, Treblinka and Majdanek. They did not exist – ever – except perhaps as the brainchild of Britain's brilliant wartime Psychological Warfare Executive". Finally, Irving claimed "the survivors of Auschwitz are themselves testimony to the absence of an extermination programme". Echoing the criticism of the Commons, a leader in The Times on 14 May 1990 described Irving as a "man for whom Hitler is something of a hero and almost everything of an innocent and for whom Auschwitz is a Jewish deception".

=== Holocaust denial lecture circuit ===
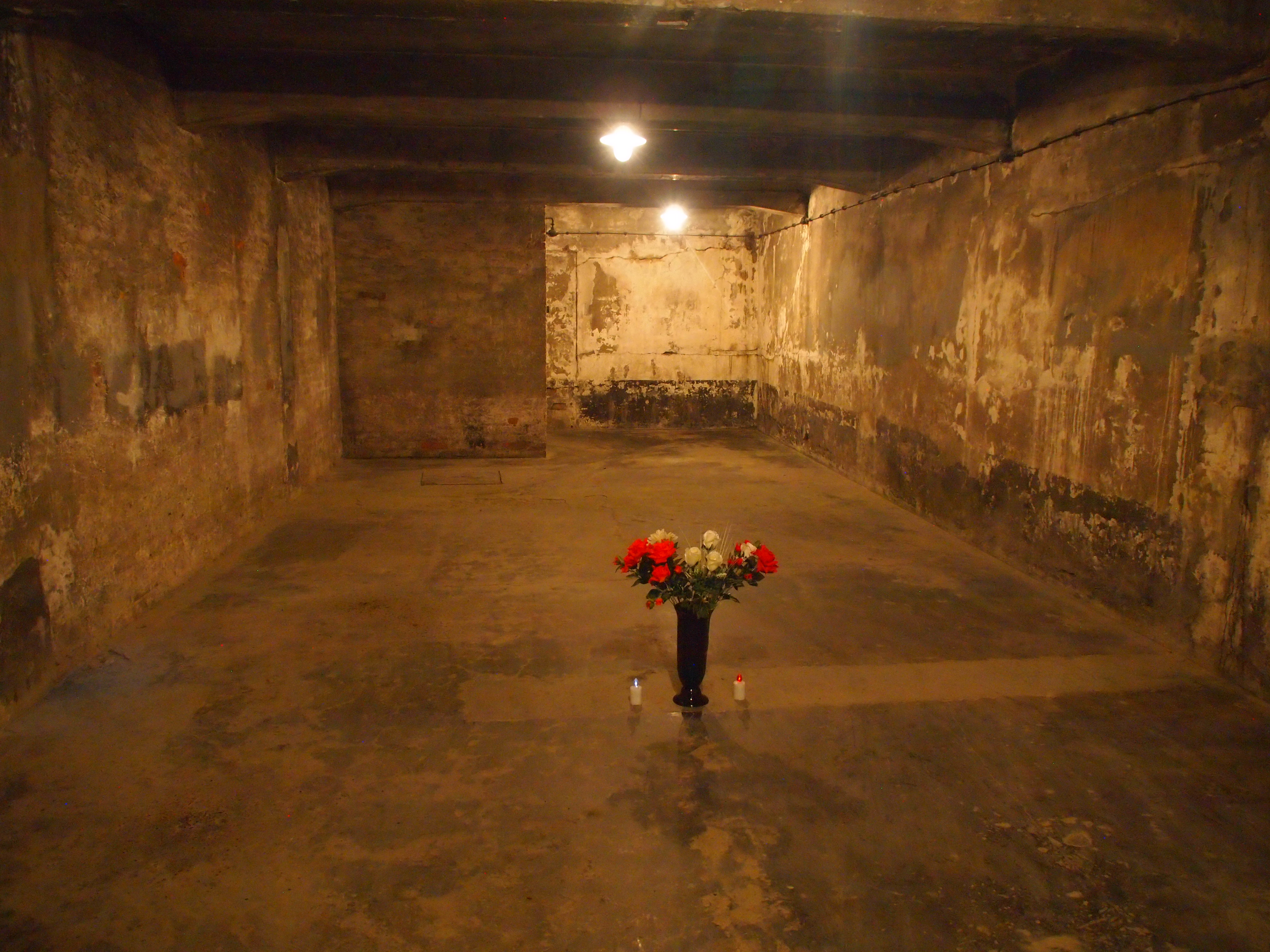
Interior of the gas chamber of Auschwitz I camp. In a speech in 1990 Irving said, "There were no gas chambers in Auschwitz. There have been only mock-ups built by the Poles in the years after the war."

In the early 1990s, Irving was a frequent visitor to Germany, where he spoke at neo-Nazi rallies. The chief themes of Irving's German speeches were that the Allies and Axis states were equally culpable for war crimes, that the decision of Neville Chamberlain to declare war on Germany in 1939, and that of Churchill to continue the war in 1940, had been great mistakes that set Britain on a path of decline, and the Holocaust was just a "propaganda exercise". In June 1990 Irving visited East Germany on a well-publicised tour entitled "An Englishman Fights for the Honour of the Germans", on which he accused the Allies of having used "forged documents" to "humiliate" the German people. Irving's self-proclaimed mission was to guide "promising young men" in Germany in the "right direction" (Irving has often stated his belief that women exist for a "certain task, which is producing us [men]", and should be "subservient to men": leading, in Lipstadt's view, to a lack of interest on Irving's part in guiding young German women in the "right direction"). German nationalists found Irving, as a non-German Holocaust denier, to be particularly credible.

In January 1990 Irving gave a speech in Moers where he asserted that only 30,000 people died at Auschwitz between 1940 and 1945, all of natural causes, which was equal—so he claimed—to the typical death toll from one Bomber Command raid on German cities. Irving claimed that there were no gas chambers at the death camp, stating that the existing remains were "mock-ups built by the Poles". On 21 April 1990 Irving repeated the same speech in Munich, which led to his conviction for Holocaust denial in Munich on 11 July 1991. The court fined Irving DM 7,000 (equivalent to €3147.38 in 2021). Irving appealed against the judgment, and received a fine of DM 10,000 (€4496.27 in 2021) for repeating the same remarks in the courtroom on 5 May 1992. During his appeal in 1992, Irving called upon those present in the Munich courtroom to "fight a battle for the German people and put an end to the blood lie of the Holocaust which has been told against this country for fifty years". Irving went on to call the Auschwitz death camp a "tourist attraction" whose origins Irving claimed went back to an "ingenious plan" devised by the British Psychological Warfare Executive in 1942 to spread anti-German propaganda that it was the policy of the German state to be "using 'gas chambers' to kill millions of Jews and other undesirables". During the same speech, Irving denounced the judge as a "senile, alcoholic cretin". Following his conviction for Holocaust denial, Irving was banned from visiting Germany.

Expanding upon his thesis in Hitler's War about the lack of a written order by the Führer for the Holocaust, Irving argued in the 1990s that the absence of such an order meant that there was no Holocaust at all. In a speech delivered in Toronto in November 1990, Irving claimed that Holocaust survivors had manufactured memories of their suffering because "there's money involved and they can get a good compensation cash payment out of it". In that speech, Irving used the metaphor of a cruise ship named Holocaust, which Irving claimed had "luxury wall to wall fitted carpets and a crew of thousands ... marine terminals established in now virtually every capital in the world, disguised as Holocaust memorial museums". Irving went on to assert that the "ship" was due for rough sailing because recently the Soviet government had allowed historians access to "the index cards of all the people who passed through the gates of Auschwitz", and claimed that this would lead to "a lot of people [who] are not claiming to be Auschwitz survivors anymore" (Irving's statement about the index cards was incorrect: what the Soviet government had made available in 1990 were the death books of Auschwitz, recording the weekly death tolls). Irving claimed on the basis of what he called the index books that, "Because the experts can look at a tattoo and say 'Oh yes, 181, 219 that means you entered Auschwitz in March 1943'" and he warned Auschwitz survivors "If you want to go and have a tattoo put on your arm, as a lot of them do, I am afraid to say, and claim subsequently that you were in Auschwitz, you have to make sure a) that it fits in with the month you said you went to Auschwitz and b) it is not a number which anyone used before".

On 17 January 1991 Irving told a reporter from The Jewish Chronicle that "The Jews are very foolish not to abandon the gas chamber theory while they still have time". Irving went on to say that he believed anti-semitism will increase all over the world because "the Jews have exploited people with the gas chamber legend" and that "In ten years, Israel will cease to exist and the Jews will have to return to Europe". In his 1991 revised edition of Hitler's War, he had removed all references to death camps and the Holocaust. In a speech given in Hamburg in 1991, Irving stated that in two years' time "this myth of mass murders of Jews in the death factories of Auschwitz, Majdanek and Treblinka ... which in fact never took place" will be disproved (Auschwitz, Majdanek, and Treblinka were all well established as being extermination camps). Two days later, Irving repeated the same speech in Halle, in West Germany. At another 1991 speech, this time in Canada, Irving called the Holocaust a "hoax", and again predicted that by 1993 the "hoax" would have been "exposed".

In November 1992 Irving was to be a featured speaker at a world anti-Zionist congress in Stockholm that was cancelled by the Swedish government. Also scheduled to attend were his fellow Holocaust deniers Robert Faurisson, Leuchter and Louis Farrakhan, together with representatives of the Palestinian group Hamas, the Lebanese Shiite group Hezbollah and the right-wing Russian antisemitic group Pamyat. In a speech in 1993 Irving claimed that there had been only 100,000 Jewish deaths at Auschwitz, "but not from gas chambers. They died from epidemics". Irving went on to claim that most of the Jewish deaths during World War II had been caused by Allied bombing. Irving claimed that "The concentration camp inmates arrived in Berlin or Leipzig or in Dresden just in time for the RAF bombers to set fire to those cities. Nobody knows how many Jews died in those air raids".

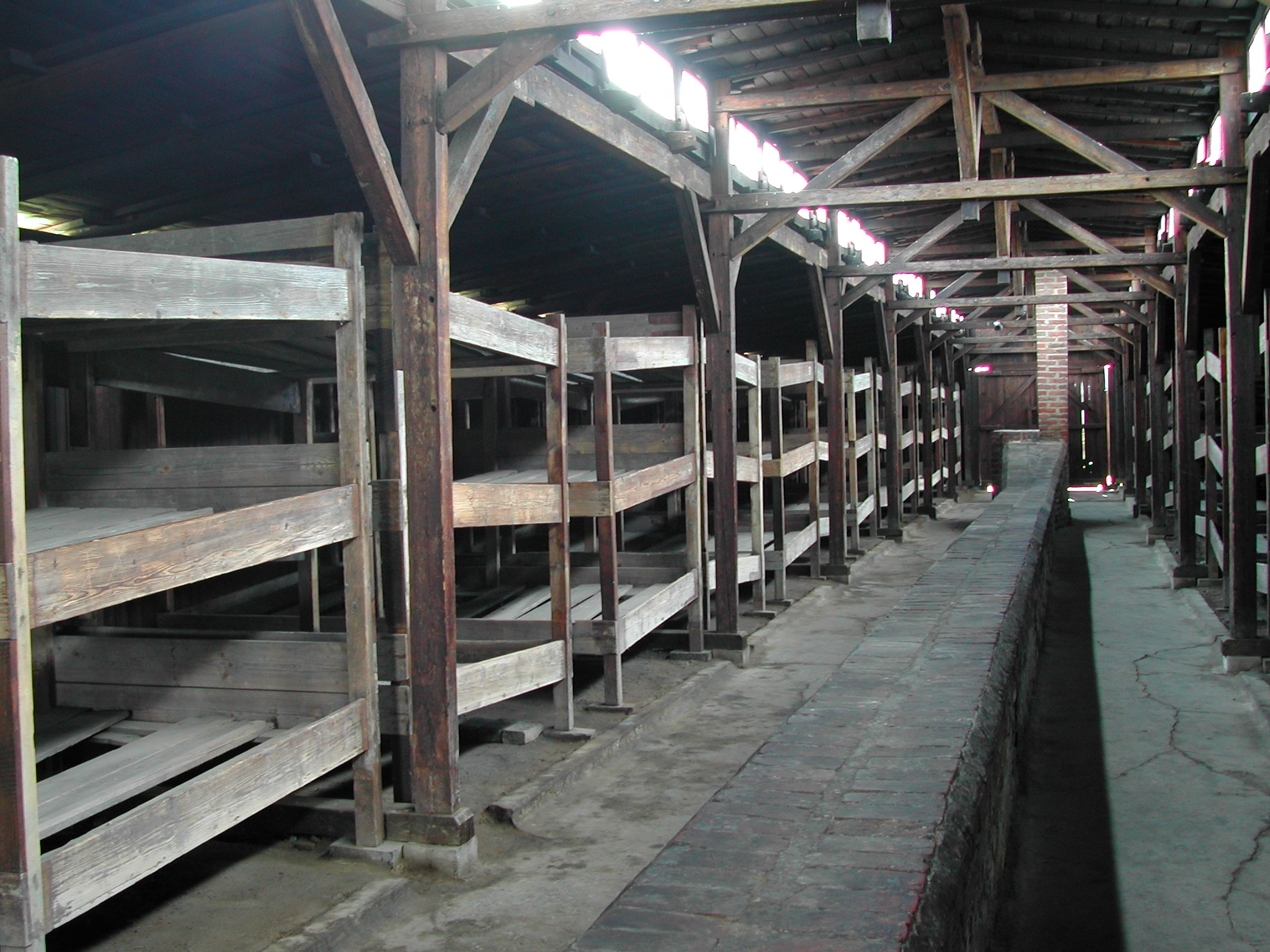
Inside a barracks in Auschwitz II Birkenau. In 1992, during appeal of his conviction for Holocaust denial, Irving called Auschwitz a "tourist attraction".

In a speech in 1994, Irving lamented that his predictions of 1991 had failed to occur, and complained of the persistence of belief in the "rotting corpse" of the "profitable legend" of the Holocaust. In another 1994 speech, Irving claimed that there was no German policy of genocide of Jews, and that only 600,000 Jews died in concentration camps in World War II, all due to either Allied bombing or disease. At the same time, Irving started to appear more frequently at the annual conferences hosted by the IHR. In a 1995 speech, Irving claimed that the Holocaust was a myth invented by a "world-wide Jewish cabal" to serve their own ends. Irving also spoke on other topics at the IHR gatherings. A frequent theme was the claim that Churchill had advance knowledge of the Japanese plans to attack Pearl Harbor, and refused to warn the Americans, in order to bring the United States into the war. In 1995 he stated that, "We revisionists, say that gas chambers didn't exist and that the 'factories of death' didn't exist." In 1999 Irving said during a television interview, "I'm a gas chamber denier. I'm a denier that they killed hundreds of thousands of people in gas chambers, yes."

At the same time, Irving maintained an ambivalent attitude to Holocaust denial depending on his audience. In a 1993 letter, Irving lashed out against his former friend Zündel, writing that: "In April 1988 I unhesitatingly agreed to aid your defence as a witness in Toronto. I would not make the same mistake again. As a penalty for having defended you then, and for having continued to aid you since, my life has come under a gradually mounting attack: I find myself the worldwide victim of mass demonstrations, violence, vituperation and persecution" (emphasis in the original). Irving went on to claim his life had been wonderful until Zündel had got him involved in the Holocaust denial movement: van Pelt argues that Irving was just trying to shift responsibility for his actions in his letter. In an interview with Australian radio in July 1995, Irving claimed that at least four million Jews died in World War II, though he argued that this was due to terrible sanitary conditions inside the concentration camps as opposed to a deliberate policy of genocide in the death camps. Irving's statement led to a very public spat with his former ally Faurisson, who insisted that no Jews were killed in the Holocaust. Depending on his audience, during the 1990s Irving either used the absence of a written Führerbefehl (Führer order) for the "Final Solution" to argue that Hitler was unaware of the Holocaust, or claimed that the absence of a written order meant there was no Holocaust at all.

== Racism and antisemitism ==
Although Irving denies being a racist, he has expressed racist and antisemitic sentiments, both publicly and privately. Irving has often expressed his belief in the conspiracy theory of Jews secretly ruling the world, and that the belief in the reality of the Holocaust was manufactured as part of the same alleged conspiracy. Irving used the label "traditional enemies of the truth" to describe Jews, and in a 1963 article about a speech by Sir Oswald Mosley wrote that the "Yellow Star did not make a showing". In 1992, Irving stated that "the Jews are very foolish not to abandon the gas chamber theory while they still have time" and claimed he "foresees a new wave of antisemitism" the world over due to Jewish "exploitation of the Holocaust myth". During an interview with the American writer Ron Rosenbaum, Irving restated his belief that Jews were his "traditional enemy". In one interview cited in the libel lawsuit, Irving also stated that he would be "willing to put [his] signature" to the "fact" that "a great deal of control over the world is exercised by Jews".

After Irving was sacked by The Sunday Times to help them with their serialisation of the Goebbels diaries, he described a group of protesters outside his flat as, "All the scum of humanity stand outside. The homosexuals, the gypsies, the lesbians, the Jews, the criminals, the Communists..."

Several of these statements were cited by the judge's decision in Irving's lawsuit against Penguin Books and Deborah Lipstadt, leading the judge to conclude that Irving "had on many occasions spoken in terms which are plainly racist." One example brought was his diary entry for 17 September 1994, in which Irving wrote about a ditty he composed for his young daughter "when half-breed children are wheeled past":

I am a Baby Aryan
Not Jewish or Sectarian
I have no plans to marry an
Ape or Rastafarian.

Christopher Hitchens wrote that Irving sang the rhyme to Hitchens's wife, Carol Blue, and daughter, Antonia, in a lift following drinks in the family's flat in Washington, D.C.

== Persona non grata ==
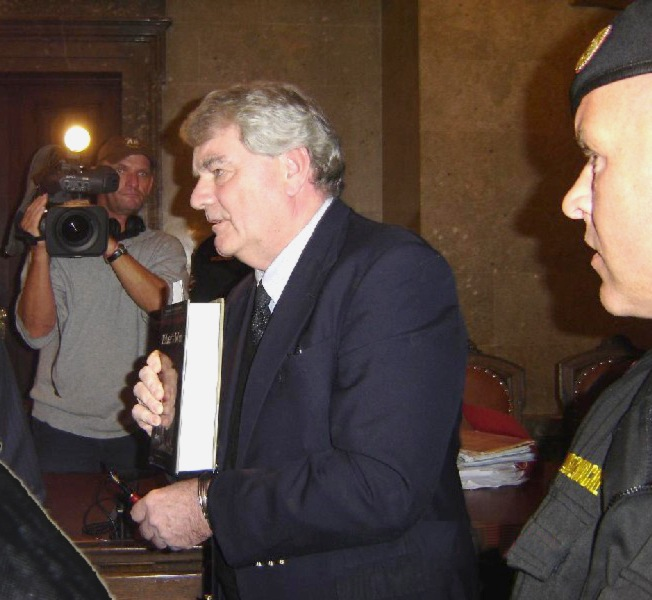
Irving during his trial in Austria with a copy of his book Hitler's War

After Irving denied the Holocaust in two speeches given in Austria in 1989, the Austrian government issued an arrest warrant for him and barred him from entering the country. In early 1992, a German court found him guilty of Holocaust denial under the Auschwitzlüge section of the law against Volksverhetzung (a failed appeal by Irving would see the fine rise from 10,000 DM to 30,000 DM), and he was subsequently barred from entering Germany. Other governments followed suit, including Italy and Canada, where he was arrested in November 1992 and deported to the United Kingdom. In an administrative hearing surrounding those events, he was found by the hearing office to have engaged in a "total fabrication" in telling a story of an exit from and return to Canada which would, for technical reasons, have made the original deportation order invalid. He was also barred from entering Australia in 1992, a ban he made five unsuccessful attempts to overturn.

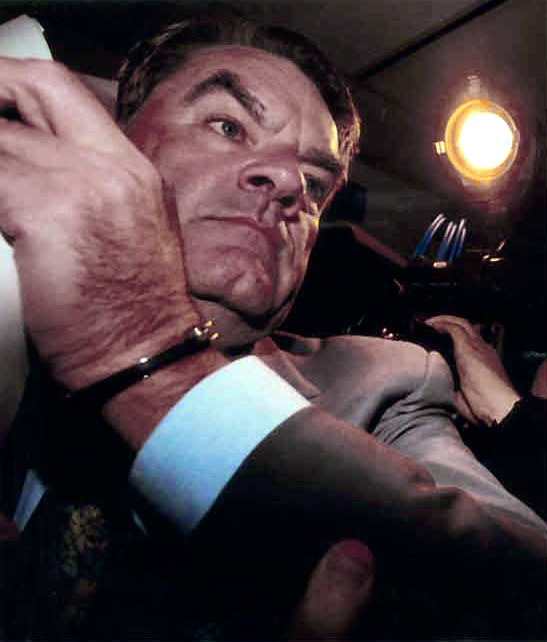
Irving being deported from Canada, 1992

In 1992, Irving signed a contract with Macmillan Publishers for his biography of Goebbels titled Goebbels: Mastermind of the Third Reich. Following charges that Irving had selectively "edited" a recently discovered complete edition of Goebbels's diaries in Moscow, Macmillan cancelled the book deal. The decision by The Sunday Times (who had bought the rights to serialised extracts from the diaries before Macmillan published them) in July 1992 to hire Irving as a translator of Goebbels's diary was criticised by the British historian Peter G. J. Pulzer, who argued that Irving, because of his views about the Third Reich, was not the best person for the job. Andrew Neil, the editor of The Sunday Times, called Irving "reprehensible", but defended hiring him because he was only a "transcribing technician", which others criticised as a poor description of translation work.

In February 1994, Irving spent 10 days of a 3-month sentence at HM Prison Pentonville in London for contempt of court following a legal wrangling over publishing rights.

In 1995 St. Martin's Press of New York City agreed to publish the Goebbels biography. After protests, they cancelled the contract, leaving Irving in a situation in which, according to D. D. Guttenplan, he was desperate for financial help, publicity, and the need to restore his reputation. The book was eventually self-published.

=== Libel suit ===
On 5 September 1996, Irving filed a libel suit against Deborah Lipstadt and her British publisher Penguin Books for publishing the British edition of Lipstadt's book, Denying the Holocaust, which had first been published in the United States in 1993. In the book, Lipstadt called Irving a Holocaust denier, falsifier and bigot, and said that he manipulated and distorted real documents.

During the trial, Irving claimed that Hitler had not ordered the extermination of the Jews of Europe, was ignorant of the Holocaust and was a friend of the Jews.

Lipstadt hired the British solicitor Anthony Julius to present her case, while Penguin Books hired Kevin Bays and Mark Bateman, libel specialist from media firm Davenport Lyons. They briefed the libel barrister Richard Rampton QC and Penguin also briefed junior barrister Heather Rogers. The defendants (with Penguin's insurers paying the fee) also retained Professor Richard J. Evans, historian and Professor of Modern History at Cambridge University, as an expert witness. Also working as expert witnesses were the American Holocaust historian Christopher Browning, the German historian Peter Longerich, and the Dutch architectural expert Robert Jan van Pelt. The last wrote a report attesting to the fact that the death camps were designed, built and used for the purpose of mass murder, while Browning testified for the reality of the Holocaust. Evans' report was the most comprehensive, in-depth examination of Irving's work:

Not one of [Irving's] books, speeches or articles, not one paragraph, not one sentence in any of them, can be taken on trust as an accurate representation of its historical subject. All of them are completely worthless as history, because Irving cannot be trusted anywhere, in any of them, to give a reliable account of what he is talking or writing about ... if we mean by historian someone who is concerned to discover the truth about the past, and to give as accurate a representation of it as possible, then Irving is not a historian.

The BBC quoted Evans further:

Irving ... had deliberately distorted and wilfully mistranslated documents, consciously used discredited testimony and falsified historical statistics. ... Irving has fallen so far short of the standards of scholarship customary amongst historians that he does not deserve to be called a historian at all.

Not only did Irving lose the case, but in light of the evidence presented at the trial a number of his works that had previously escaped serious scrutiny were brought to public attention. He was also ordered to pay all of Penguin's trial costs, estimated to be as much as £2 million (US$3.2 million), though it is uncertain how much of these costs he would ultimately pay. When he did not meet these, Davenport Lyons moved to make him bankrupt on behalf of their client. He was declared bankrupt in 2002, and lost his home, though he has been able to travel around the world despite his financial problems.

Irving subsequently appealed to the Civil Division of the Court of Appeal. On 20 July 2001 his application for appeal was denied by Lords Justices Malcolm Pill, Charles Mantell and Richard Buxton.

The libel suit was depicted in the 2016 film Denial.

=== Life after the libel suit ===
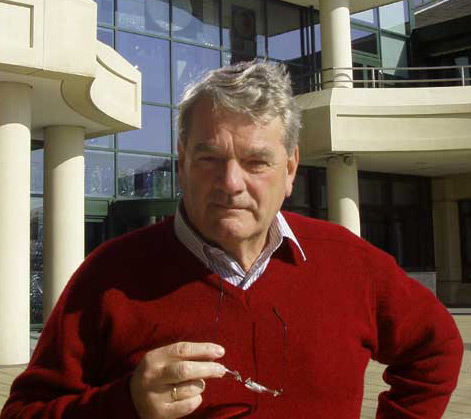
Irving at the National Archives of the United Kingdom, 2003

In July 2004, the New Zealand government decided not to allow Irving to enter the country unless he applied for and was granted special permission. This decision was made on the grounds that he had previously been deported from a different country. Members of the Jewish community had requested that he not be permitted to visit, with the New Zealand Jewish Council's president stating that Irving was "well known for his anti-Jewish writings and activities, and was found by the High Court in London in 2002 to be racist, [and] an active Holocaust denier". Irving attempted to travel to New Zealand in September 2004, but was refused permission to board a flight from Los Angeles on the grounds that he did not have permission to enter the country.

On 11 November 2005, the Austrian police in the southern state of Styria, acting under the 1989 warrant, arrested Irving. Irving pleaded guilty to the charge of "trivialising, grossly playing down and denying the Holocaust". Irving stated in his plea that he had changed his opinions on the Holocaust, "I said that then based on my knowledge at the time, but by 1991 when I came across the Eichmann papers, I wasn't saying that anymore and I wouldn't say that now. The Nazis did murder millions of Jews." Irving had obtained the papers from Hugo Byttebier, a Belgian who had served in the SS during the war and had escaped to Argentina. Irving was sentenced to three years' imprisonment in accordance with the law prohibiting Nazi activities (Verbotsgesetz, "Prohibition Law"). Irving sat motionless as judge Peter Liebetreu asked him if he had understood the sentence, to which he replied "I'm not sure I do" before being escorted out of the court by Austrian police. Later, Irving said that he was shocked by the severity of the sentence. He had reportedly already purchased a plane ticket home to London.

In December 2006, Irving was released from prison and banned from ever returning to Austria. Upon Irving's arrival in the UK he reaffirmed his position, stating that he felt "no need any longer to show remorse" for his views on the Holocaust. On 18 May 2007, he was expelled from the 52nd Warsaw International Book Fair in Poland because the books he took there were deemed by the organisers as promoting Nazism and antisemitism, which is in violation of Polish law.

Since then, Irving continued to work as a freelance writer, despite his troubled public image. He was drawn into the controversy surrounding Bishop Richard Williamson, who in a televised interview recorded in Germany in November 2008 denied the Holocaust took place, only to see Williamson convicted for incitement in April 2010 after refusing to pay a fine of €12,000. Irving subsequently found himself beset by protesters on a book tour of the United States. He also gave lectures and tours in the UK and Europe; one tour to Poland in September 2010 which led to particular criticism included the Treblinka death camp as an itinerary stop.

Irving and Nick Griffin (then the British National Party leader) were invited to speak at a forum on free speech at the Oxford Union on 26 November 2007, along with Anne Atkins and Evan Harris. The debate took place after Oxford Union members voted in favour of it, but was disrupted by protesters. As of 2016 Irving was lecturing to small audiences at venues disclosed to carefully vetted ticket-holders a day or two before the event on topics, including antisemitic conspiracy theories, and at one such event, claiming to write the truth unlike "conformist historians" while asserting fabrications about leading Nazis, the life and death of Himmler and the saturation bombings during the war.

Irving established a website selling Nazi memorabilia in 2009. The items are offered by other people, with Irving receiving a commission from each sale for authenticating them. Irving stated in 2009 that the website was the only way he could make money after being bankrupted in 2002. Items sold through the website include Hitler's walking stick and a lock of Hitler's hair. Irving has also investigated the authenticity of bones purported to be from Hitler and Eva Braun.

During an interview with Johann Hari, Irving said that in the 1970s Erwin Giesing, one of Hitler's doctors, had quoted Hitler to him thus: "One day, an Englishman will come along and write my biography. But it cannot be an English man of the present generation. They won't to [sic] be objective. It will have to be an Englishman of the next generation, and one who is totally familiar with all the German archives." Irving said that Giesing had identified him as the objective Englishman that Hitler had spoken of.

During the same interview, Irving claimed that various Nazis hid what was happening to the Jews from Hitler because he was "the best friend the Jews had in the Third Reich".

=== 2009 Norwegian Festival of Literature ===
In October 2008, controversy arose in Norway over Irving's invitation to speak at the 2009 Norwegian Festival of Literature. Several of Norway's most distinguished authors protested against the invitation. The leader of the board for the festival, Jesper Holte, defended the invitation by stating: "Our agenda is to invite a liar and a falsifier of history to a festival about truth. And confront him with this. Irving has been invited to discuss his concept of truth in light of his activity as a writer of historical books and the many accusations he has been exposed to as a consequence of this." Although Irving was introduced in the festival's webpages as "historian and writer", the board chair leader defended the more aggressive language being used to characterise Irving in connection with the controversy that had arisen. Lars Saabye Christensen and Roy Jacobsen were two authors who had threatened to boycott the festival on account of Irving's invitation, and Anne B. Ragde stated that Sigrid Undset would have turned in her grave. As the festival has as its subsidiary name "Sigrid Undset Days", a representative of Undset's family had requested that the name of the Nobel laureate be removed in connection with the festival. Also, the Norwegian free-speech organisation Fritt Ord was critical of letting Irving speak at the festival and had requested that its logo be removed. In addition, Edvard Hoem announced that he would not attend the 2009 festival with Irving taking part. Per Edgar Kokkvold, leader of the Norwegian Press Confederation, advocated cancelling Irving's invitation.

Days after the controversy had started, the invitation was rescinded. This led to the resignation of Stig Sæterbakken from his position as content director as he was the person who had invited Irving to the event. The head of the Norwegian Festival of Literature, Randi Skeie, deplored what had taken place: "Everything is fine as long as everyone agrees, but things get more difficult when one doesn't like the views being put forward." Sæterbakken called his colleagues "damned cowards", arguing that they were walking in lockstep.

According to editor-in-chief Sven Egil Omdal of Stavanger Aftenblad, the opposition to Irving's participation at the festival appeared as a concerted effort. He suggested that campaign journalism from two of Norway's largest newspapers, Dagbladet and Aftenposten, and Norway's public service broadcaster NRK was behind the controversy.

David Irving commented that he had not been told that the festival was going to present him as a liar, and that he was preparing a lecture about the real history of what took place in Norway during the Second World War, contrary to what official historians have presented. Irving stated that he had thought the Norwegian people to be "made of tougher stuff."

Only days after the cancellation Irving announced that he would go to Lillehammer during the literature festival and deliver his two-hour lecture from a hotel room.

== Reception by historians ==
Irving, once held in regard for his expert knowledge of German military archives, was a controversial figure from the start. His interpretations of the war were widely regarded as unduly favourable to the German side. At first this was seen as personal opinion, unpopular but consistent with full respectability as a historian.

By 1988, however, Irving had begun to reject the status of the Holocaust as a systematic and deliberate genocide. He soon became the main proponent of Holocaust denial. This, along with his association with far-right circles, dented his standing as a historian. A marked change in Irving's reputation can be seen in the surveys of the historiography of the Third Reich produced by Ian Kershaw. In the first edition of Kershaw's book The Nazi Dictatorship in 1985, Irving was called a "maverick" historian working outside the mainstream of the historical profession. By the time of the fourth edition of The Nazi Dictatorship in 2000, Irving was described only as a historical writer who had in the 1970s engaged in "provocations" intended to provide an "exculpation of Hitler's role in the Final Solution".

The description of Irving as a historian, rather than an author writing about history, is controversial, with some publications since the libel trial continuing to refer to him as a "historian" or "disgraced historian", while others insist he is not a historian, and have adopted alternatives such as "author" or "historical writer". The military historian John Keegan praised Irving for his "extraordinary ability to describe and analyse Hitler's conduct of military operations, which was his main occupation during the Second World War". Donald Cameron Watt, Emeritus Professor of Modern History at the London School of Economics, wrote that he admires some of Irving's work as a historian, though he rejects his conclusions about the Holocaust. At the libel proceedings against Irving, Watt declined Irving's request to testify, appearing only after a subpoena was ordered. He testified that Irving had written a "very, very effective piece of historical scholarship" in the 1960s, which was unrelated to his controversial work. He also said that Irving was "not in the top class" of military historians.

== Personal life ==
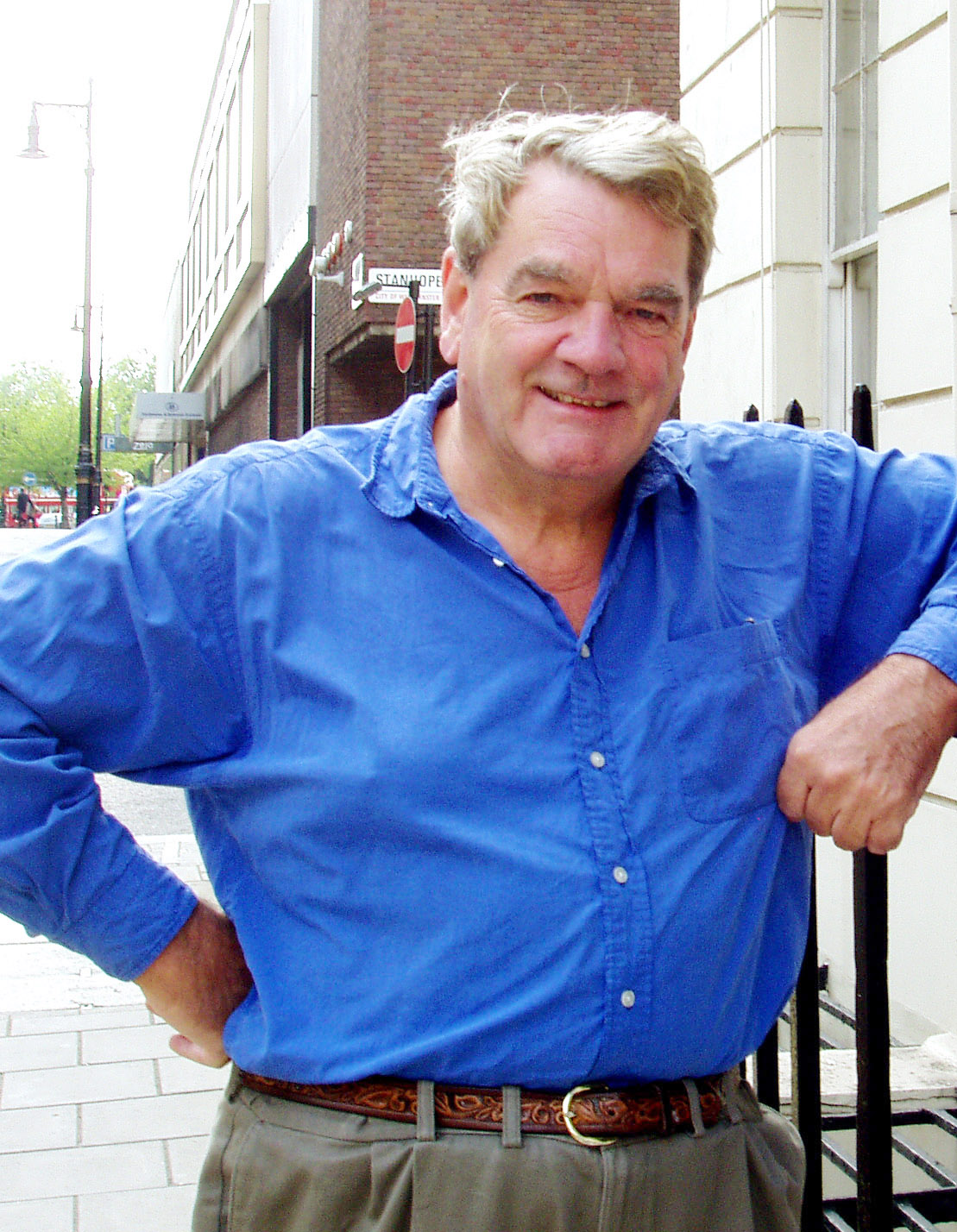
Irving in 2004

In 1961, while living in Spain, Irving met and married a Spaniard, María del Pilar Stuyck. They have four children. They divorced in 1981. In 1992, Irving began a relationship with a Danish model, Bente Hogh. They have a daughter, born in 1994.

Irving's daughter Josephine suffered from schizophrenia. She was involved in a car crash in 1996 which resulted in her having to have both of her legs amputated. In September 1999, at the age of 32, she died by suicide by throwing herself out of a window of her flat in Central London. One of the wreaths sent to her funeral contained a card which stated in German, "Truly a merciful death, Philipp Bouhler and friends". The reference to Bouhler was a reference to the Nazi who was in charge of Hitler's euthanasia programme for people with disabilities and the mentally ill. Irving described it as a "very cruel taunt".

Irving's twin brother has changed his name to avoid being associated with him.

=== Illness ===
In February 2024, Irving's family announced that he had fallen ill while in Florida in the United States in October 2023 and "has been in declining health ever since", had been hospitalised for two months, and has returned to England, but requires "round-the-clock care". The statement also says "It is with sadness that we must accept that David is now unable to engage in his life's work".

== In popular culture ==
- In 1982 Irving appeared on In Search of... Season 6, Episode 20, Eva Braun, offering his commentary on the episode's exploration of whether or not she died in the Bunker with Hitler. Irving explained the testimony by Otto Gunsche Hitler's Adjutant, whom Irving had interviewed in his research.
- In 1988 Irving made an extended appearance on the Channel 4 discussion programme After Dark.
- Irving was portrayed by Roger Lloyd-Pack in the 1991 ITV series Selling Hitler.
- Irving was portrayed by John Castle in courtroom dramatisations of the Lipstadt case for the PBS Nova episode "Holocaust on Trial" (2000).
- Irving is portrayed by Timothy Spall in the 2016 film Denial, based on Lipstadt's 2005 book History on Trial: My Day in Court with a Holocaust Denier.
- In 2009, Australian comedian John Safran interviewed Irving for the television series John Safran's Race Relations. Safran arranged for the interview to take place in a radio studio that had been altered to resemble a gas chamber. During the interview, he left the room, blocked the door and opened a gas cylinder, telling Irving that the room was filling with gas and that he would deny the incident if Irving reported it. Irving appeared amused by the prank. The segment received a mixed response: academic Dvir Abramovich criticised it as an insensitive use of Holocaust imagery, while writer Julie Szego defended it as satire that exposed Irving's racist views.

== Works ==
Books

- The Destruction of Dresden (1963) ISBN 0-7057-0030-5, updated and revised 1995 as Apocalypse 1945, The Destruction of Dresden, further revised for 2007
- The Mare's Nest (1964)
- The Virus House (1967)
- The Destruction of Convoy PQ17 (1968), reprinted (1980) ISBN 0-312-91152-1, updated in 2009.
- Accident – The Death of General Sikorski (1967) ISBN 0-7183-0420-9
- Breach of Security (1968) ISBN 0-7183-0101-3
- The Rise and Fall of the Luftwaffe (1973), a biography of Erhard Milch ISBN 0-316-43238-5
- The Night the Dams Burst (1973): (in 3 parts).
- Hitler's War (1977), updated in 2000 as a millennium edition
- The Trail of the Fox (1977), a biography of Erwin Rommel ISBN 0-525-22200-6, reissued 1999 in Wordsworth Military Library, ISBN 1-84022-205-0
- The War Path (1978) ISBN 0-670-74971-0
- The War Between the Generals (1981)
- Uprising! (1981), ISBN 0-949667-91-9
- The Secret Diaries of Hitler's Doctor (1983) ISBN 0-02-558250-X
- The German Atomic Bomb: The History of Nuclear Research in Nazi Germany (1968) ISBN 0-671-28163-1
- Der Morgenthau Plan 1944–45 (in German only) (1986) ISBN 9783817900015
- War between the Generals (1986) ISBN 0-86553-069-6, updated in 2010.
- Hess, the Missing Years (1987) Macmillan, ISBN 0-333-45179-1
- Churchill's War (1987) ISBN 0-947117-56-3: (in 4 parts).
- Göring (1989) ISBN 0-688-06606-2, updated in 2010.
- Das Reich hört mit (in German only) (1989) ISBN 9783887411350
- Hitler's War (1991), revised edition, incorporating The War Path
- Der unbekannte Dr. Goebbels: Die geheimen Tagebücher 1938 (in German only) (1995) ISBN 9781872197111
- Goebbels – Mastermind of the Third Reich (1996) ISBN 1-872197-13-2, cleaned-up and corrected in 2014
- Nuremberg: The Last Battle (1996) ISBN 1-872197-16-7
- Churchill's War Volume II: Triumph in Adversity (1997) ISBN 1-872197-15-9: (in 3 parts)
- Hitler's War and the War Path (2002) ISBN 1-872197-10-8
- True Himmler (2020) ISBN 1-872197-83-3

Translations

- The Memoirs of Field-Marshal Keitel (1965)
- The Service: The Memoirs of General Reinhard Gehlen (1972)

Monographs

- The Night the Dams Burst (1973) ISBN 9781872197357
- Von Guernica bis Vietnam (in German only) (1982) ISBN 9783453014794
- Die deutsche Ostgrenze (in German only) (1990)
- Banged Up: Survival as a Political Prisoner in 21st Century Europe (2008)

== See also ==
- Arthur Butz
- Faurisson affair
- Historical negationism
- Critical responses to David Irving
