= The Destruction of Dresden =

1963 book by David Irving

- Cover of the first edition
- Author: David Irving
- Language: English
- Subject: Bombing of Dresden in World War II
- Publisher: William Kimber & Co.
- Publication date: 1963
- Publication place: United Kingdom
- Media type: Print (Hardcover and Paperback)
- ISBN: 0705700305
- Followed by: The Mare's Nest

The Destruction of Dresden is a 1963 book by British author and historian David Irving, who later became known as a Holocaust denier. The book describes the February 1945 Allied bombing of Dresden in World War II. The book became an international best-seller during the 1960s debate about the morality of the World War II area bombing of the civilian population of Nazi Germany. Despite having long being praised and held in high esteem, the book is no longer considered to be an authoritative or reliable account of the Allied bombing and destruction of Dresden during February 1945. (Note: "Not one of [Irving's] books, speeches or articles, not one paragraph, not one sentence in any of them, can be taken on trust as an accurate representation of its historical subject. All of them are completely worthless as history, because Irving cannot be trusted anywhere, in any of them, to give a reliable account of what he is talking or writing about (Evans 1996d, General Conclusion ¶ 6.21).)

== Origins ==
The book, an international best seller when published in the 1960s, is based on a series of 37 articles about strategic bombing during World War II titled Wie Deutschlands Städte starben (How Germany's Cities Died) which Irving wrote for the German journal Neue Illustrierte.

== Deaths ==
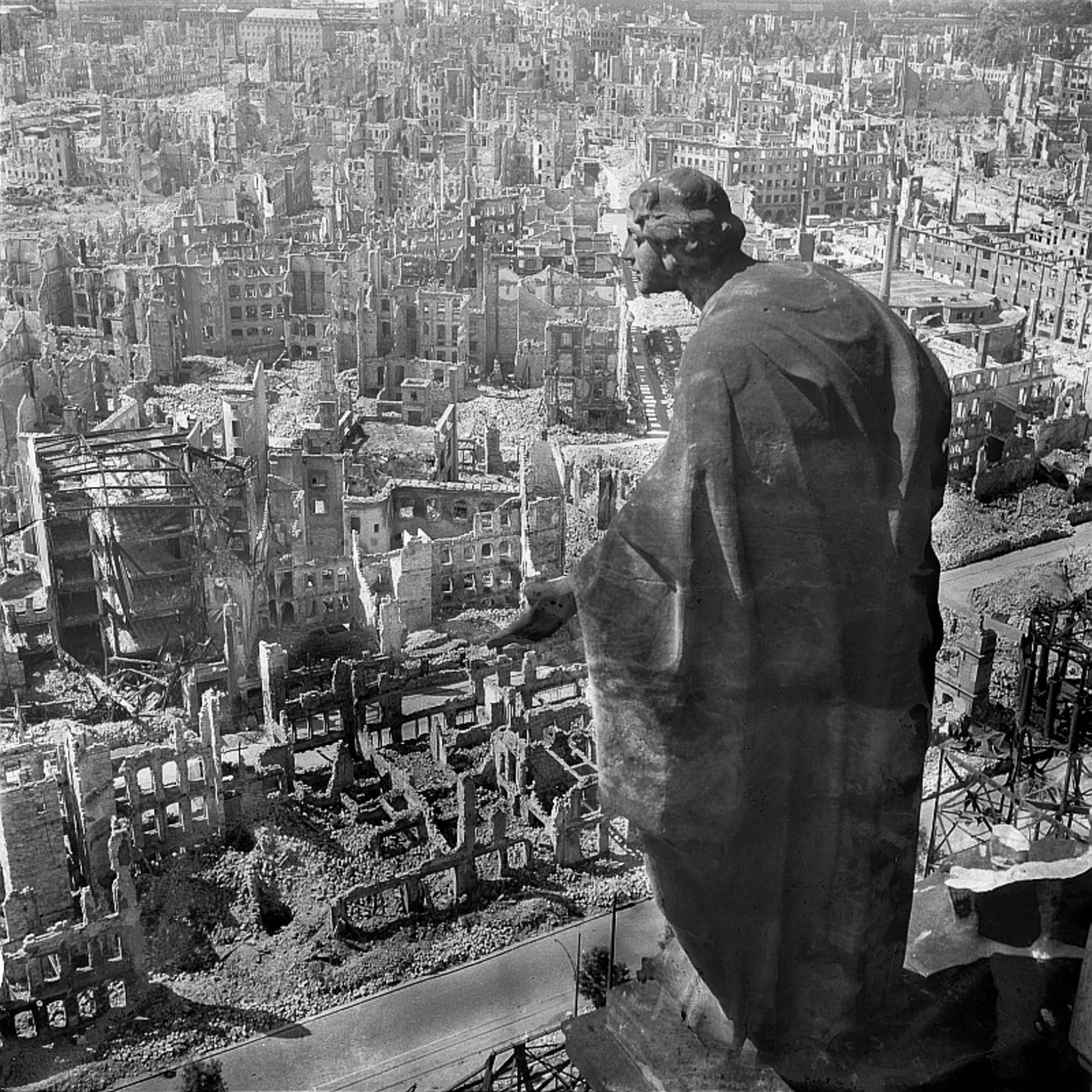
Dresden, 1945, view from the city hall (Rathaus) over the destroyed city

In the first edition, Irving estimated that the two Royal Air Force raids and the first U.S. Army Air Forces raid combined were "estimated authoritatively to have killed more than 135,000 of the population [of Dresden]..." and the "documentation suggests very strongly that the figure was certainly between a minimum of 100,000 and a maximum of 250,000". (Note: An authoritative independent investigation commissioned by the city council of Dresden in 2010 reported a maximum of 25,000 victims (Neutzner 2010, p. 68).) In 1965, General Ira C. Eaker identified the number as 135,000.

Irving's first edition figures became widely accepted and were used in many standard reference works. In later editions of the book over the next three decades, he gradually adjusted the figure to:

- In the 1971 edition, the three raids "estimated authoritatively to have killed more than 100,000 of the population...".
- In the 1995 edition, the three raids "cost the lives of between fifty and one hundred thousand inhabitants....". Richard J. Evans states that "Elsewhere he dropped the lower figure and said the attack cost 'up to a hundred thousand people their lives'".

According to Evans, an expert witness for the defence at the 2000 libel trial of Deborah Lipstadt, Irving based his estimates of the dead at Dresden on the word of one individual, Hans Voigt, who provided no supporting documentation, used a document forged by the Nazis, and described one witness named Max Funfack as Dresden's Deputy Chief Medical Officer. Funfack had made it clear by letter to Irving on 19 January 1965 that he had not been either the Chief or Deputy Chief Medical Officer in Dresden, that he had no knowledge of any documentation about the number of people who were killed in the bombing, and during the war he had only heard rumours, which varied greatly, over the number of people who were killed in the raids.

== Influence on literature ==
The writer Kurt Vonnegut (who witnessed the bombing of Dresden from the basement of a slaughterhouse as a prisoner of war) used The Destruction of Dresden as a source for the 1969 novel Slaughterhouse Five and the 1962 novel Mother Night, in the latter he wrote that he emerged from the slaughterhouse to discover that "135,000 Hansels and Gretels had been baked like gingerbread men".
