= Mare's nest =

Mare's nest may refer to

- "excitement over something which does not exist"; see Mare § Etymology
- The Mare's Nest, a 1964 book by David Irving about the German V-weapons campaign
- Maresnest, a video release for All That Glitters Is a Mares Nest by Cardiacs
- "Mare's Nest", a song by Cardiacs from On Land and in the Sea
