= Critical responses to David Irving =

Critical responses to British author and Holocaust denier David Irving have changed dramatically as Irving, a writer on the subject of World War II and Nazism, changed his own public political views; further, there are doubts as to how far Irving applies the historical method. This article documents some of these critical responses over the course of his writing career.

== Overview ==
Irving was once held in regard for his expert knowledge of German military archives. Much of his scholarship was disputed by historians to the point that his standing as a historian was challenged from his earliest publications.

Beginning in the 1970s, Irving began to claim that Nazi leader Adolf Hitler had neither ordered the extermination of the Jews nor known about the Holocaust. Contentious in large part for advancing interpretations of the war considered favourable to the German side and for association with far-right groups that advanced these views, by 1988 he began advocating the view that the Holocaust did not take place as a systematic and deliberate genocide, and quickly grew to be one of the most prominent advocates of Holocaust denial, costing him what scholarly reputation he had outside those circles.

A marked change in Irving's reputation can be seen in the surveys of the historiography of the Third Reich produced by British historian Ian Kershaw. In the first edition of Kershaw's book The Nazi Dictatorship (1985), Irving was called a "maverick" historian working outside of the mainstream of the historical profession. By the time of the fourth edition of The Nazi Dictatorship in 2000, Irving was described only as a historical writer who had in the 1970s engaged in "provocations" intended to provide an "exculpation of Hitler's role in the Final Solution".

== Reaction to Irving's work ==
=== 1960s–1970s ===
In a review of 1977, the British historian Hugh Trevor-Roper wrote that "no praise can be too high for his [Irving's] indefatigable, scholarly industry". Trevor-Roper followed up his praise by expressing severe doubts about Irving's methodology. Trevor-Roper argued that: "He [Irving] seizes on a small, but dubious particle of 'evidence'; builds upon it, by private interpretation, a large general conclusion; and then overlooks or re-interprets the more substantial evidence and probability against it. Since this defective method is invariably used to excuse Hitler or the Nazis and to damage their opponents, we may reasonably speak of a consistent bias, unconsciously distorting the evidence". Finally, Trevor-Roper commented: "When a historian relies mainly on primary sources, which we can not easily check, he challenges our confidence and forces us to ask critical questions. How reliable is his historical method? How sound is his judgment? We ask these questions particularly of a man like Mr. Irving, who makes a virtue of — almost a profession — of using arcane sources to affront established opinions". Trevor-Roper ended by writing "He may read his manuscript diaries correctly. But we can never be quite sure, and when he is at most original, we are likely to be least sure".

The British historian A.J.P. Taylor called Irving in 1978 an author of "unrivaled industry" and "good scholarship" regarding research in the archives. Taylor criticised Irving's double standard with historical judgements, using as an example Irving's claim that the lack of a written Führer order proves that Hitler did not know about the Holocaust while at the same time claiming that the lack of a written order proved that Churchill ordered the supposed murder of Polish General Władysław Sikorski (in Accident, Irving claimed that there was a written order for Sikorski's death, but that Churchill had it destroyed). The British historian Paul Addison in 1979 described Irving as a "colossus of research", but criticised him for his view of "Churchill as wicked as Hitler" and as "a schoolboy in judgment". In a book review published in the Frankfurter Allgemeine Zeitung on 18 June 1979, the German historian Andreas Hillgruber for the most part offered a highly unfavorable judgment of Irving's work. Despite his criticism, Hillgruber ended his review with the comment that Irving's work "amounts to an indubitable and in no way small merit of Irving". In 1979, the German historian Jost Dülffer wrote that Irving was very good at tracking down and interviewing Hitler's former servants, but went on to write that, "One can draw no appropriate picture of Hitler from the perspective of his domestic personnel. What kind of importance has a questioning of Hitler's valet or of other such persons?".

=== 1980s ===
In a review of Irving's book Churchill's War (1988), David Cannadine criticised Irving's "double standard on evidence", accusing Irving of "demanding absolute documentary proof to convict the Germans (as when he sought to show that Hitler was not responsible for the Holocaust), while relying on circumstantial evidence to condemn the British (as in his account of the Allied bombing of Dresden)".

Writing in 1989 about Irving's Göring biography, the German-Canadian historian Peter Hoffmann declared:

Mr. Irving's constant references to archives, diaries and letters, and the overwhelming amount of detail in his work, suggest objectivity. In fact they put a screen behind which a very different agenda is transacted… Mr. Irving is a great obfuscator… Distortions affect every important aspect of this book to the point of obfuscation… It is unfortunate that Mr Irving wastes his extraordinary talents as a researcher and writer on trivializing the greatest crimes in German history, on manipulating historical sources and on highlighting the theatrics of the Nazi era".

Hoffman went on to write that though Irving had at one time played a useful role in the historical profession by making outrageous assertions that at least had the benefit of inspiring historians to undertake research to rebut him, the time for that had now passed, and that Irving was simply irrelevant to the study of the Third Reich.

In a feuilleton published in the Frankfurter Allgemeine Zeitung on 18 October 1989 the German historian Rainer Zitelmann praised Irving for having "struck a nerve" with his provocative style and aggressive assertions. Zitelmann found much to be praised about Irving's claim that the lack of a written Führer order for the Holocaust suggests that Hitler was unaware of the Holocaust, and argued that if that was true, then historians should stop holding the Holocaust against Hitler. Zitelmann ended his article with the claim that "Irving must not be ignored. He has weaknesses [but he is] one of the best knowers of sources…[and has] contributed much to research". The British historian John Charmley commented that "Irving's sources, unlike the conclusions which he draws from them, are usually sound", and that Irving "has been unjustly ignored".

=== 1990s ===
In 1990, the American historian Peter Baldwin called Irving a historian who "has made a career of seeking to shift culpability for the worst atrocities from Hitler and to draw also the Allies into proximity with the outrages of the war". In 1992, Robert G. L. Waite called Irving's work "a calumny both on the victims of Hitler's terror and on historical scholarship". About Irving's claims of Hitler's ignorance of the Holocaust, Waite commented that "no one but Hitler had the authority to give the orders to murder more than six million people in the mist of war". In his book, A World at Arms (1994), the American historian Gerhard Weinberg described Irving as "notoriously unreliable", and criticised those historians who used Irving to support their arguments.

The British historian John Keegan wrote in his book The Battle for History (1996): "Some controversies are entirely bogus, like David Irving's contention that Hitler's subordinates kept from him the facts of the Final Solution, the extermination of the Jews". In a 20 April 1996 review in The Daily Telegraph of Goebbels: Mastermind of the Third Reich, Keegan wrote that Irving "knows more than anyone alive about the German side of the Second World War", and claimed that Hitler's War was "indispensable to anyone seeking to understand the war in the round".

During Irving's lawsuit against Deborah Lipstadt, Keegan — whom he had subpoenaed to appear as a witness — lambasted Irving by saying: "I continue to think it perverse of you to propose that Hitler could not have known until as late as October 1943 what was going on with the Jewish people" and, when asked if it was perverse to say that Hitler did not know about the Final Solution, answered "that it defies common sense". In an article in The Daily Telegraph of 12 April 2000, Keegan spoke of his experience of the trial, writing that Irving had an "all-consuming knowledge of a vast body of material" and exhibited "many of the qualities of the most creative historians", that his skill as an archivist could not be contested, and that he was "certainly never dull". However, according to Keegan, "like many who seek to shock, he may not really believe what he says and probably feels astounded when taken seriously".

In the 1990s, Irving featured on his website a translation of a letter by the prominent German historian Hans Mommsen, praising Irving's skill as a researcher. Mommsen, who had written the letter in 1977, unsuccessfully attempted to have it removed, but did succeed in forcing Irving to feature a second letter from him written in 1998 in which Mommsen completely disavowed his 1977 letter under the grounds that he did not wish to be associated with Irving's recent statements about the Holocaust.

In a six-page essay in The New York Review of Books published on 19 September 1996 the American historian Gordon A. Craig, a leading scholar of German history at Stanford University, wrote about Irving's claim that the Holocaust never took place and his description of Auschwitz as merely "a labor camp with an unfortunately high death rate". Though "such obtuse and quickly discredited views" may be "offensive to large numbers of people", Craig argued that Irving's work is "the best study we have of the German side of the Second World War" and that "we dare not" disregard his views. Craig called Irving a "useful irritant"; a "devil's advocate" historian who promoted what Craig considered to be a twisted and wrong-headed view of history, with a great deal of élan, but his advocacy of these views forced historians to make a fruitful epistemological examination about the current state of knowledge about the Third Reich.

The Hungarian-American historian John Lukacs in his book The Hitler of History (1997) has labelled Irving an apologist for Hitler who consistently mishandled historical evidence in Hitler's favour. Lukacs maintains that over the years, Irving's treatment of Hitler has gone from a barely concealed admiration to a Great Man treatment. Lukacs argues that Irving's picture of Hitler is defective because of his tendency to confuse asserting that Hitler was a great warlord as being the same thing as proving Hitler was a military genius, which leads to a total neglect of the crucial question of why Hitler took particular decisions at particular times. Lukacs condemned Irving as a historical writer for his "twisting" of evidence (i.e. labelling Adolf Eichmann's statement before an Israeli court in 1961 that he heard from Himmler that Hitler had given a verbal order for the Holocaust as mere "hearsay"). Lukacs described Irving in the 1997 American edition of The Hitler of History as the most influential of Hitler's apologists, and found it "regrettable" that many professional historians "relied on some of Irving's researches" and praised Irving. Lukacs called Irving's historical opinions objectionable and inexcusable, and complained that too many of Irving's opinions were supported by footnotes that referred either to sources that did not exist or said something different from what Irving wrote. Some of the examples Lukacs cited in support of his claim was Irving's contemptuous statement mocking the Polish cavalry for charging German tanks (a legend discredited even in the 1970s when Irving wrote Hitler's War), asserting with no source that Hitler refused a lavish banquet prepared for him in Warsaw in 1939 out of the desire to eat the same rations as the ordinary German soldier, for crediting — again with no source — a statement to Hitler in August 1940 that he would let Churchill live in peace after defeating Britain, for falsely claiming Operation Typhoon, the German drive onto Moscow in 1941, was forced on him by his General Staff, and for putting his own words in a speech of Hitler in September 1943 implying Churchill was a decadent homosexual (not something that was in Hitler's speech). Lukacs asserted too many of the crucial statements by Irving in Hitler's War — such as his claim that Hitler foresaw Operation Uranus, the Soviet counter-offensive at the Battle of Stalingrad, or his claim that the Hungarian leader Major Ferenc Szálasi wanted to fight to the bitter end in 1944–45 (when he wished for a German-Soviet compromise peace) — were completely dishonest and untrue statements supported by references to non-existent documents.

American writer Ron Rosenbaum questioned Irving about a memoir in his possession that was alleged to have been written by Adolf Eichmann in the 1950s. The precise authenticity of the Eichmann Memoirs is in doubt, but parts of the book, according to the German Federal Archives, appeared to be genuine (though the book was apparently the result of an interview between Eichmann and an Argentine journalist in the 1950s). Irving had received the alleged memoir during a visit to Argentina in December 1991, when it was presented to him after he had spoken at a neo-Nazi rally and was quite proud of his find. In The Eichmann Memoirs, Eichmann claimed to have heard from Himmler that Hitler had given a verbal order authorising the Holocaust, thereby contradicting Irving's claim in Hitler's War that Hitler was unaware of the Holocaust. Irving's response to the claim that Hitler ordered the Holocaust in The Eichmann Memoirs was to claim that Eichmann wrote his memoirs in 1956 at the time of the Suez War, and was fearful that Cairo, Egypt might fall to Israel. Irving told Rosenbaum that his philosophy of history is a strictly empirical one, and that: "I tried to apply the three criteria that Hugh Trevor-Roper thought were indispensable to reading documents. Three questions you ask of a document: Was it genuine? Was it written by somebody who was in a position to know what he's writing about? And why does this document exist? The third one is the crucial one with the Eichmann papers. He's writing in 1956 at the time of the Suez crisis; we know because he refers to it". Irving's reasoning is that if Cairo was taken by the Israeli Defence Forces, then the Israelis might discover the "rat-line", as undercover smuggling networks for Nazis were known, that had allowed Eichmann to escape to Argentina, and that therefore Eichmann had written his memoirs as a potential defence in the event of being captured by the Israelis. In this way, Irving argued that The Eichmann Memoirs were genuine but that the claim that Hitler ordered the Holocaust was false — made only to reduce Eichmann's responsibility for the Holocaust. Also in the same interview, Irving claimed wanting acceptance as a scholar by other historians and bemoaned having to associate with what he called the lunatic fringe anti-Semitic groups; he claimed he would disassociate himself from these groups full of "cracked" people as soon as he was accepted by the historians' community. Rosenbaum sarcastically wrote in his book Explaining Hitler that if Irving wanted to be considered a historian, he was going about it in a rather strange way by denying the Holocaust at neo-Nazi rallies.

== 21st century ==
Canadian academic and former diplomat Peter Dale Scott has written that "even Irving’s enemies give him grudging credit for his standard historical writings. And I believe that to write in this field, it is impossible to ignore what Irving has written."

Holocaust deniers were still attending Irving's meetings and tours in 2010 but others may see him as unbalanced. According to journalist Julian Kossoff, "It's as if everyone has come round to realising that Irving's as pathetic as he's pathological. As one Holocaust survivor succinctly put it: "I used to really hate him but now I just think he's a nutter." In 2017, Irving claimed to have a younger generation of followers.

== Inaccuracies exposed ==
The author Martin Middlebrook published a number of books on second world war operations. In two of his books he exposes inaccuracies in the works of David Irving.

In the book The Mare's Nest, Irving describes the English bombing raid on Peenemünde. Part of the English attack plan on Peenemünde was to lure the German fighters away from the target by a small diversion attack on Berlin. Irving describes how the Germans fell for this trap and that subsequently there was a huge méléé of German fighters and flak shooting at each other over Berlin (pp. 108-9). Subsequently many of the German aircraft were supposed to have been lost when they all tried to land on the same airfield. None of this could be found back in surviving squadron war diaries, reports of casualties and losses nor in the interviews that Middlebrook had with German pilots who participated in the battle. No battle took place over Berlin that night and no German aircraft were attacked nor lost near Berlin. Middlebrook supposes that Irving has been misled by accounts of 'unscrupulous' Luftwaffe personalities that were in conflict with each other and were trying to settle scores after the war.

In Und Deutschlands Städte Starben Nicht: Ein Dokumentarbericht Irving wrote a chapter about the RAF Nuremberg Raid on the night of 30–31 March 1944, in which the RAF took exceptional heavy losses. Irving describes a scene on the afternoon of 30 March (before the raid got started) where a German interrogation officer tries to press an English airman into talking freely since they already knew that the target of the night was Nuremberg and the Germans were setting an ambush. Two days later that English airman was shown an English newspaper that confirmed the Nuremberg attack and heavy losses. Irving gives names and places, but upon verification by Middlebook the story could not stand: the English airman proved to be fictional; the German interrogator did exist, but the man himself confirmed that the Germans had never been able to detect a prospective target of an air raid in advance. Also, some tactical errors on the German side would have certainly been avoided if the Germans knew the target in advance. For example, the 'Wild Boar' fighters were sent to Berlin and not Nuremberg; some aircraft stationed in the vicinity of Nuremberg were either not called up, or were sent in the wrong direction.

== See also ==
- History Wars (Australia)
- Historikerstreit
