= The Mare's Nest =

1964 book by David Irving

- Author: David Irving
- Language: English
- Subject: German V-weapons programme
- Publisher: Little, Brown
- Publication date: 1964
- Publication place: United Kingdom
- Media type: Print
- OCLC: 314552227
- Preceded by: The Destruction of Dresden
- Followed by: The Virus House

The Mare's Nest is a 1964 book by English author David Irving, focusing on the German V-weapons campaign of 1944–45 and the Allied military and intelligence effort (Operation Crossbow) to counter it. The book covers both sides of the story – the Allied arguments over how to interpret intelligence concerning the status and existence of the V-weapons and the German debate over how to deploy the new weapons to make the most of their supposed capacity to reverse the tide of the war. During his research for the book, Irving discovered that the Allies had broken the German Enigma code, over a decade before that became public knowledge, but agreed to keep it secret. The Mare's Nest was well received by reviewers and those involved in Operation Crossbow and has been widely cited by authors writing about the V-weapons program.

Retrospectively, the book is still praised for its extensive research but criticised for minimising the Nazi slave labour programmes of Mittelwerk and Nordhausen, about which Irving certainly knew.

== Publication history ==
The book was Irving's second, published the year after his best-seller The Destruction of Dresden, and had its origins in the success of that book. Irving had intended to return to studying for a degree but abandoned his plans when his publisher proposed that he should write two more books, covering the V-weapons programme and the life of Adolf Hitler. He discovered that Winston Churchill's scientific adviser, Lord Cherwell, had been closely involved in tracking the V-weapons and that Cherwell's papers were held at Nuffield College, Oxford. Irving was given full access to the archive and made a startling discovery: that the Allies had been reading the German codes, a fact that was still regarded as top secret. He began to fear that he would be denied access to the archive if the authorities realised that he had uncovered ULTRA, the Allies' wartime programme of decrypting the Enigma machine codes and other German codes and cyphers. As he later put it, he resorted to doing "the unthinkable. I began borrowing documents, taking them down to London to copy. But I always sedulously returned them."

Irving nonetheless worked the secret material into his book, writing an entire chapter about Enigma in the first draft of The Mare's Nest. When it came to the attention of the authorities, "one night I was visited at my flat by men in belted raincoats who came and physically seized the chapter. I was summoned to the Cabinet Office, twelve men sitting around a polished table, where it was explained to me why [the information] was not being released and we appeal to you as an English gentleman not to release [it]." Irving cooperated and withdrew the chapter, but by this time he had copied enough material from Cherwell's archive to furnish several more books. ULTRA remained secret for another decade.

The book's title comes from a phrase used by Lord Cherwell to describe the V-weapons; he was sceptical of the existence of the V-2 rocket, regarding it (wrongly, as it turned out) as technologically infeasible, and referred to it as a "mare's nest" (meaning a remarkable discovery which later turns out to be illusory).

== Reception ==
The book was well received at the time by reviewers. Writing in The Economist, William Kimber called it "remarkable" for its coverage of both sides, Allied and German. He concluded that the book shows that the British reached the right conclusions, despite errors along the way, while the Germans hindered their own efforts with disputes between the army, air force, SS and civilian ministers. The Times noted that the book highlighted how the hunt for the V-weapons was punctuated by "conflicts of personality between scientists, intelligence officers, and Service leaders", while at the same time conveying "the efficiency of the British Intelligence Services at the lower level" even if the higher-level co-ordination was sometimes lacking. The Guardian's Clare Hollingworth noted that the book "provides some excellent quotations from intelligence documents, both British and German, as well as sketches of Peenemünde and of the [V-2 rocket]" and suggested that "perhaps scientists or soldiers engaged in rocketry" would find it useful.

William Connor, under his pen-name Cassandra in The Daily Mirror, called it "one of the most fascinating books I have read for a long time". Duncan Sandys, who had chaired the Crossbow Committee responsible for co-ordinating the Allied response to the V-weapons, called it an "authoritative account of the V-weapon offensive" in his review for the London Evening Standard. He commended the author for having "successfully woven [his research] together into a coherent narrative, written in a brisk style", though he faulted Irving for having relied too heavily on Lord Cherwell's papers, with the result that he had treated "the problem as primarily one of scientific intelligence and [paid] insufficient attention to other more important aspects of the operation." Nonetheless, Sandys concluded, "students will find in The Mare's Nest a mine of important information, while much wider circles will enjoy David Irving's vivid presentation of a strange story."

The book has been widely cited by authors covering the V-weapons programme. Even after Irving's reputation was destroyed after his exposure as a Holocaust denier, Michael J. Neufeld of the Smithsonian's National Air and Space Museum has described The Mare's Nest as "the most complete account on both Allied and German sides of the V-weapons campaign in the last two years of the war."
