= Hans Voigt =

German Army Officer

- Born: 21 February 1896; Hanover, Province of Hanover, Kingdom of Prussia, German Empire
- Died: 26 April 1969 (aged 73); Frankfurt am Main, Hesse, West Germany
- Relatives: ∞ 18 June 1929 Ursula Elsa Emma Theresa Büttler; 3 daughters
- Military career
- Allegiance: German Empire; Weimar Republic; Nazi Germany
- Branch: Imperial German Army; Freikorps; Reichswehr; German Heer
- Service years: 1914–1945
- Rank: Generalmajor
- Commands: Panzer Regiment 4; Commandant of the Fortress Arnswalde; Voigt Division Group; Combat Commandant Stargard/Pomerania; Combat Commandant of Pölitz and the Langenberg Bridgehead; Commander of the Sassnitz Defense Area and Island Commandant Rügen; Island Combat Commandant Rügen
- Conflicts: World War I World War II: Invasion of Poland; Battle of France; Vistula–Oder Offensive; East Pomeranian Offensive
- Awards: Knight's Cross of the Iron Cross

Rudolf Ludwig Otto Hans Voigt (21 February 1896 – 26 April 1969) was a highly decorated Generalmajor in the Wehrmacht during World War II. He was also a recipient of the Knight's Cross of the Iron Cross.

== Promotions ==
- 2 August 1914 Kriegsfreiwilliger und Fahnenjunker (War Volunteer and Officer Candidate)
- 18 January 1915 Fahnenjunker-Gefreiter (Officer Candidate with Lance Corporal rank)
- 19 January 1915 Fahnenjunker-Unteroffizier (Officer Candidate with Corporal/NCO/Junior Sergeant rank)
- 1 February 1915 Fähnrich (Officer Cadet)
- 16 March 1915 Leutnant (2nd Lieutenant) without Patent
  - 19 April 1918 received Patent from 11 September 1913
  - 1 July 1922 received Reichswehr Rank Seniority (RDA) from 1 April 1914 (69)
- 23 November 1923 Oberleutnant (1st Lieutenant) with effect and RDA from 1 November 1923 (10)
- 1 September 1928 Hauptmann (Captain)
- 1 March 1935 Major (16)
- 31 December 1937 Oberstleutnant (Lieutenant Colonel) with effect and RDA from 1 January 1938 (25)
- 20 October 1940 Oberst (Colonel) with effect from 1 November 1940 (16)
  - 17 December 1941 received new and improved RDA from 1 February 1940 (8a)
- 10 July 1943 Generalmajor (Major General) with effect and RDA from 1 August 1943 (7)

== Awards and decorations ==
- Iron Cross (1914), 2nd and 1st Class
  - 2nd Class on 4 April 1915
  - 1st Class on 5 March 1918
- Oldenburg Friedrich August Cross, 2nd and 1st Class
  - 2nd Class (OFA2/OK2) in January 1918 with the clasp "Vor dem Feinde" (In the Face of the Enemy)
  - 1st Class (OFA1/OK1) in April 1918
- Wound Badge (1918) in Black
- Honour Cross of the World War 1914/1918 with Swords
- Wehrmacht Long Service Award, 4th to 1st Class
- Hungarian World War Commemorative Medal with Swords
- Bulgarian War Commemorative Medal 1915–1918 with Swords
- Austrian War Commemorative Medal with Swords
- Sudetenland Medal
- Repetition Clasp 1939 to the Iron Cross 1914, 2nd and 1st Class
  - 2nd Class on 20 September 1939
  - 1st Class on 30 September 1939
- Panzer Badge in Silver on 1 June 1940
- War Merit Cross (1939), 2nd and 1st Class with Swords
  - 2nd Class on 30 January 1943
  - 1st Class on 20 April 1943
- Knight's Cross of the Iron Cross on 28 April 1945 as Generalmajor and Commandant of the Fortress Arnswalde (Pommern) (Note: No evidence of the award can be found in the German Federal Archives. The Order Commission of the Association of Knight's Cross Recipients (AKCR) stated: "...Generalmajor Hans Voigt has to be considered a bearer of the Knight's Cross of the Iron Cross, even though the formalities are not 100 percent correct." because the presentation was an "authorized presentation by Himmler" as commander-in-chief of Army Group Vistula from the end of February or early March. Himmler was not authorized to make this presentation, a fact known to the AKCR, however the AKCR wanted to affiliate Voigt immediately. The AKCR therefore assigned the unsuspicious presentation date of 28 April 1945 and claimed its approval was made by the chief of the Heerespersonalamt (HPA—Army Staff Office) Wilhelm Burgdorf in Berlin. His listing by Fellgiebel contains a footnote stating "It has to be assumed that a few presentations have been made by the chief of the HPA General Burgdorf in the timeframe 20 April to 30 April." Voigt was a member of the AKCR.)

== Sources ==
- German Federal Archives: BArch PERS 6/2010 and PERS 6/301199
