= Adolf Hitler's cult of personality =

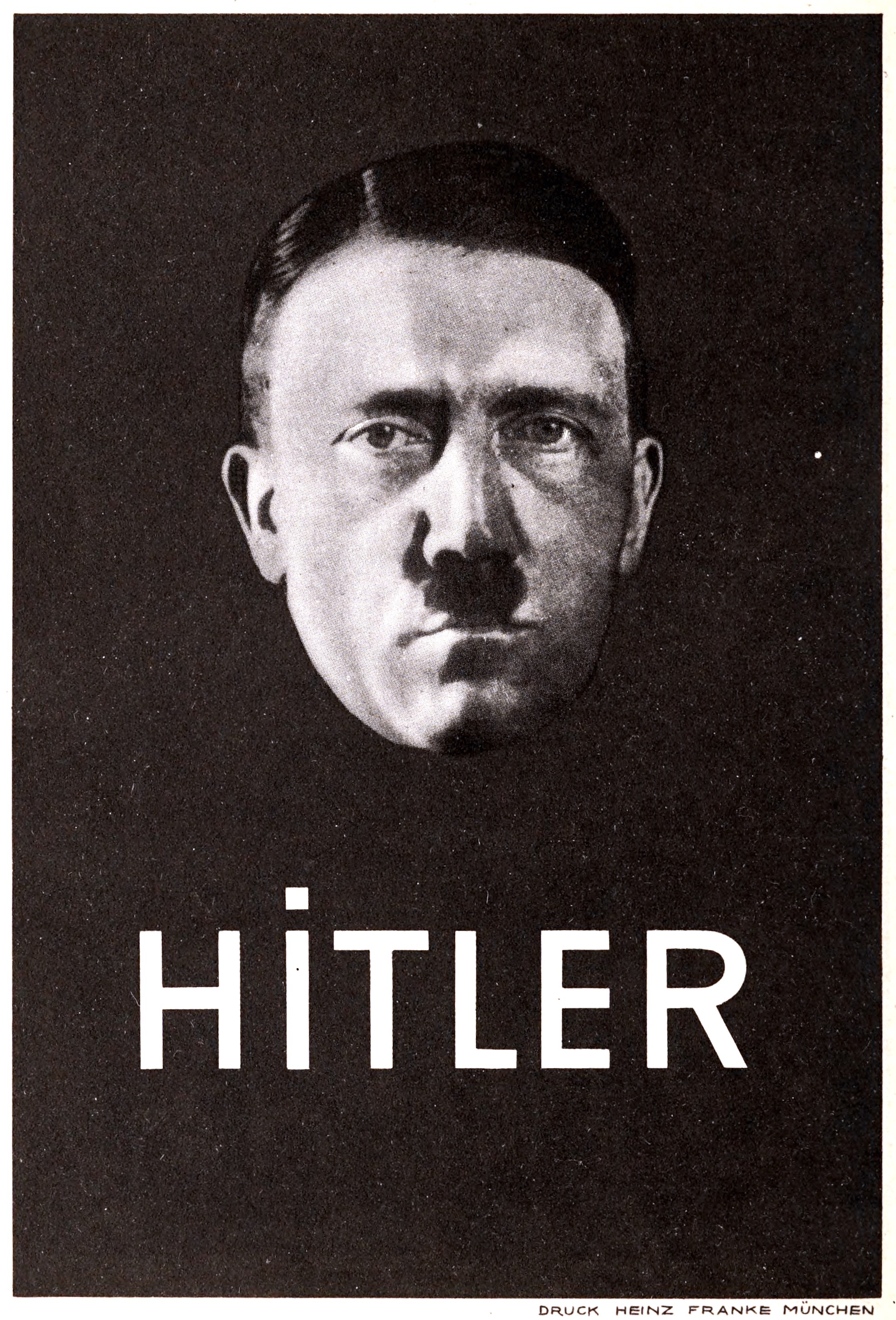
A Nazi propaganda poster of Hitler used during the 1932 German presidential election campaign

Adolf Hitler's cult of personality was a prominent feature of Nazi Germany (1933–1945), which began in the 1920s during the early days of the Nazi Party. Based on the Führerprinzip ideology, that the leader is always right, spread by incessant Nazi propaganda, and reinforced by Adolf Hitler's success in fixing Germany's economic and unemployment problems by remilitarising during the global Great Depression, his bloodless triumphs in foreign policy prior to World War II, and the rapid military defeat of the Second Polish Republic and the French Third Republic in the early part of the war, it eventually became a central aspect of the Nazi control over the German people.

The Hitler myth of an infallible multi-faceted genius with messianic and superhuman qualities approached deification. It was weaponized as a tool to unify the German people behind the personality, opinions, and goals of Hitler and was also insurance against the Nazi Party fragmenting into warring factions or a coup d'etat by the Wehrmacht.

== Adolf Hitler's image in propaganda and the mass media ==
Beginning in the early years of the Nazi Party, Nazi propaganda depicted the Nazi leader Adolf Hitler as an iconic figure who was the only person capable of saving Germany. Following the end of World War I and during the interwar period, the German people suffered greatly under the Weimar Republic and, according to the Nazis, only Hitler as a messiah could save them and restore Germany's greatness, which in turn gave rise to the myth of the "Führer-cult". As early as a few days after Benito Mussolini's "March on Rome" on 28 October 1922, a Nazi Party speaker announced to a beer-hall crowd that "Germany's Mussolini is called Adolf Hitler", thus giving a boost to Hitler's cult of personality, which was only just getting started. In December 1922, the Nazi newspaper Völkischer Beobachter claimed that Hitler was no longer the drummer of the Nazi Party, but was in fact the only leader who could rescue Germany.

After the failed Beer Hall Putsch in November 1923 and Hitler's imprisonment, he set out to construct an image of himself that would appeal to all sections of the German people. He developed over time a self-image with nationalistic and religious overtones which made him appealing to all Germans, and which prompted him to proclaim, "I have awakened the masses".

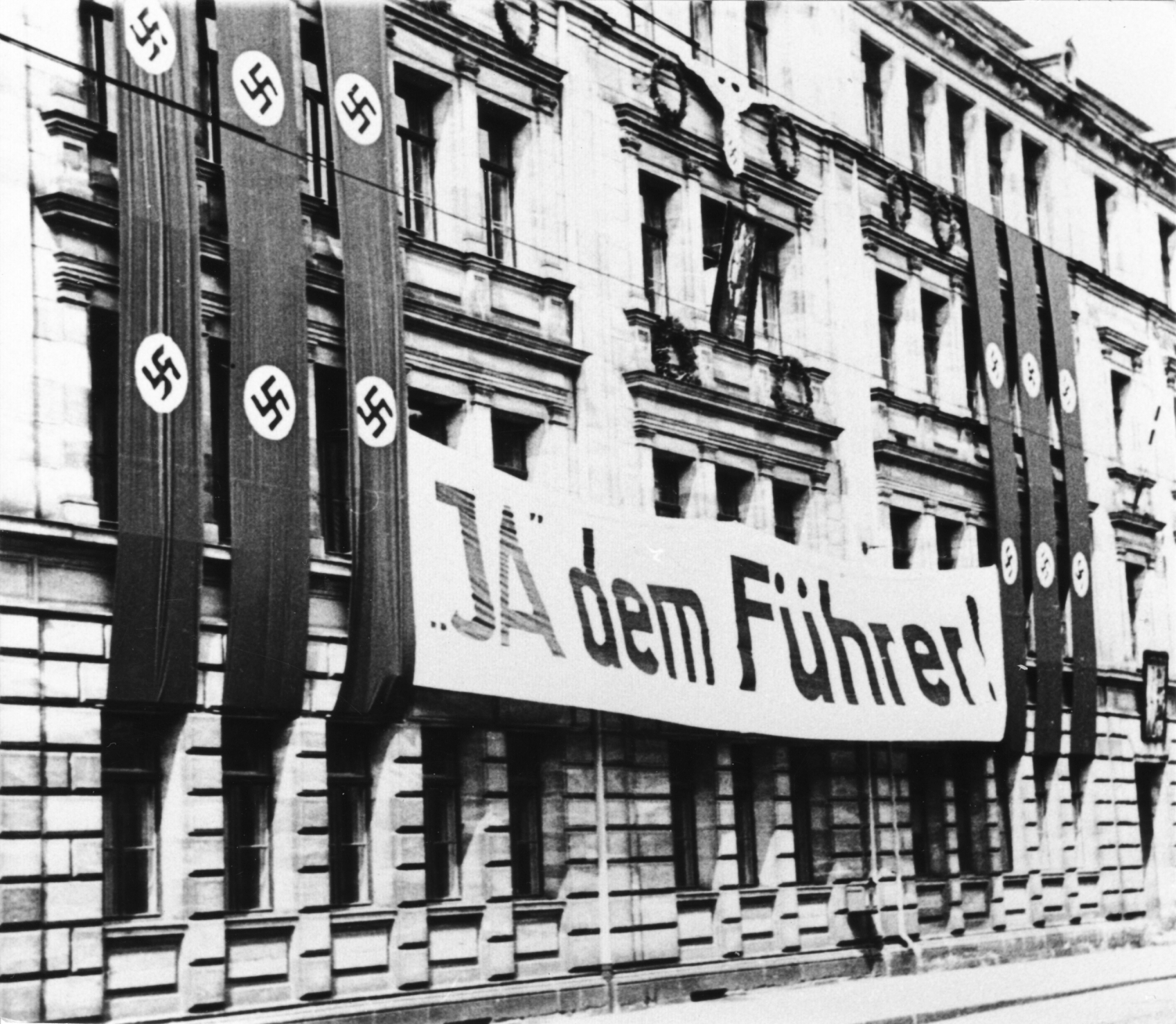
"Ja dem Führer" ("Yes to the Leader"), a Nazi slogan banner outside of a school building in Fürth for the 1934 German referendum

The Nazis deliberately chose their party's name, the "National Socialist German Workers' Party", as a way to appeal to Germans with both left-wing and right-wing sensibilities. When Hitler took over the party as its Führer ("leader") in 1921, he insisted on adding "National Socialist" to the party's name, which up to that point had simply been called the German Workers' Party. Despite Hitler and the Nazis claiming to be socialists, they were not, and it was used merely for propaganda purposes and to attract new members. (Note: British historian Richard J. Evans wrote, "Despite the change of name, however, it would be wrong to see Nazism as a form of, or an outgrowth from, socialism….Nazism was in some ways an extreme counter-ideology to socialism". British historian Ian Kershaw wrote, "He [Hitler] was wholly ignorant of any formal understanding of the principles of economics. For him, as he stated to the industrialists, economics was of secondary importance, entirely subordinated to politics. His crude social-Darwinism dictated his approach to the economy, as it did his entire political “world-view.” Since struggle among nations would be decisive for future survival, Germany’s economy had to be subordinated to the preparation, then carrying out, of this struggle. This meant that liberal ideas of economic competition had to be replaced by the subjection of the economy to the dictates of the national interest. Similarly, any “socialist” ideas in the Nazi programme had to follow the same dictates. Hitler was never a socialist. But although he upheld private property, individual entrepreneurship, and economic competition, and disapproved of trade unions and workers’ interference in the freedom of owners and managers to run their concerns, the state, not the market, would determine the shape of economic development. Capitalism was, therefore, left in place. But in operation it was turned into an adjunct of the state.") Once the Nazis were in power, they suppressed trade unions and persecuted left-wing opponents such as communists and socialists.

Nazi propaganda chief Joseph Goebbels' newspaper, Der Angriff ("The Attack"), played a large role in the creation of the Führer myth. From its early days of publication, photos and drawings of Hitler were common. The myth made Hitler seem mystical to many Nazi Party members. Hitler was regarded as a model in every aspect: he was regarded as one of the people, a worker and a soldier who put his life on the line to fight for Germany during World War I, but at the same time, the image presented was a heroic one, with Hitler depicted as a genius with almost superhuman qualities, close to a god to be venerated. After the Nazis came to power, Hitler annually received over 12,000 letters of adoration and praise from Germans of all classes and vocations, from all over the country.

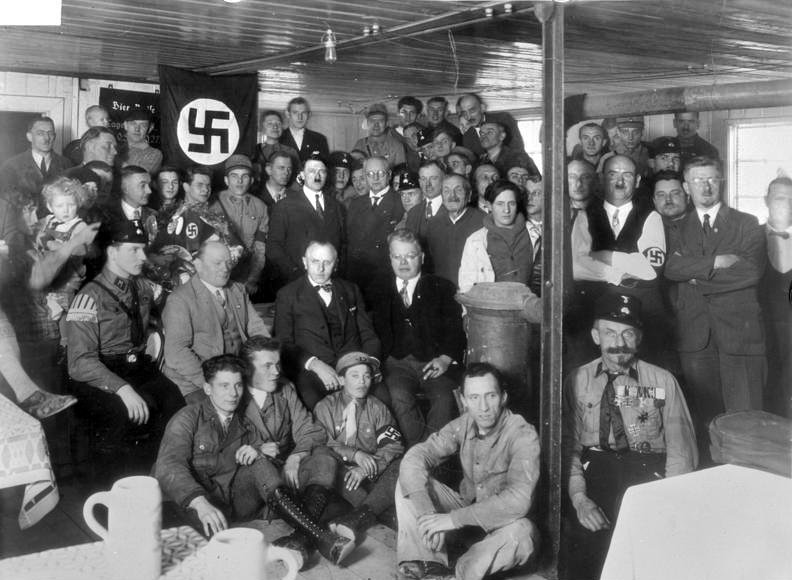
Hitler with Nazi Party members in 1930

In 1930, Hitler allegedly told Otto Strasser, “For us the Idea is the Führer, and each Party member has only to obey the Führer”. During five election campaigns in 1932, the Nazi newspaper Völkischer Beobachter ("People's Observer") portrayed Hitler as a man who had a mass movement united behind him, a man whose sole mission was to save Germany, who was the "Leader of the coming Germany". During the campaigns, Hitler took on a quasi-religious status within the party. The Völkischer Beobachter ran the headline "The National Socialist movement is the resurrection of the German nation", with the article quoting Hitler as saying, "I believe that I am instrument of nature to liberate Germany". Similarly, Goebbels wrote in Der Angriff that Hitler was "the Greater German, the Führer, the Prophet, the Fighter that last hope of the masses, the shining symbol of the German will to freedom". During those campaigns, Hitler became the first politician to campaign by air, flying from city to city under the slogan Hitler über Deutschland ("Hitler Over Germany"), sometimes visiting up to five cities in a day to make speeches before mass audiences. Hitler's charismatic and mesmerizing speaking abilities played a major role in his attraction to the German people. Hitler's oratory skills were enhanced by his ability to continually raise the pitch of his voice, sometimes by octaves, leading to a crescendo; it has been speculated this was as a result of the mustard gas attack that damaged his larynx during World War I.

During the 1932 German presidential election the Nazis pioneered new campaigning tactics, such as direct mailing and transporting Hitler across the country by airplane, allowing him to perform at several rallies in a single day. Furthermore, they would also hire venues that were deliberately too small in order to encourage overcrowding and present the perception of greater popularity for Hitler. The events would last for several hours, with Hitler's actual appearance being delayed (through continual and misleading announcements on his time to arrival) in order to generate further crowd anticipation.

As Germany's economic crisis – caused by the onset of the Great Depression – continued and grew, and as the Nazis gained political power by virtue of the number of seats they held in the Reichstag, Goebbels' propaganda machine created an image of Hitler that personified the people's anger at the Weimar Republic's inability to solve their problems. Hitler was, the propaganda said, the only man who could save Germany and create a new social order, the "people's community" (Volksgemeinschaft); Hitler was "the hope of millions", the flesh-and-blood instantiation of national salvation. According to historian Ian Kershaw, "[The people] projected onto Hitler their own beliefs, wishes and desires. He incorporated them in a vision of complete national rebirth." Goebbels cultivated an image of Hitler as a "heroic genius". During the existence of Nazi Germany, every year on the eve of Hitler's birthday, Goebbels would deliver a speech titled "Our Hitler", in which he lauded all the many supposed virtues of Hitler's personality and ideas.

The myth also gave rise to the concept behind the saying "If only the Führer knew": when the German people were dissatisfied with the way the country was being run, they blamed it on Nazi bigwigs but fell short of laying any blame on Hitler himself, instead exempting him from culpability. They believed that if Hitler knew what was happening, he would set things right. The Night of the Long Knives in 1934 – a murderous purge of Hitler's opponents inside the Nazi Party and in its paramilitary arm, the Sturmabteilung (SA), as well as numerous others – was presented to the public as Hitler preventing chaos by preemptively suppressing a coup attempt. This helped to reinforce Hitler's image as the protector of the German people.

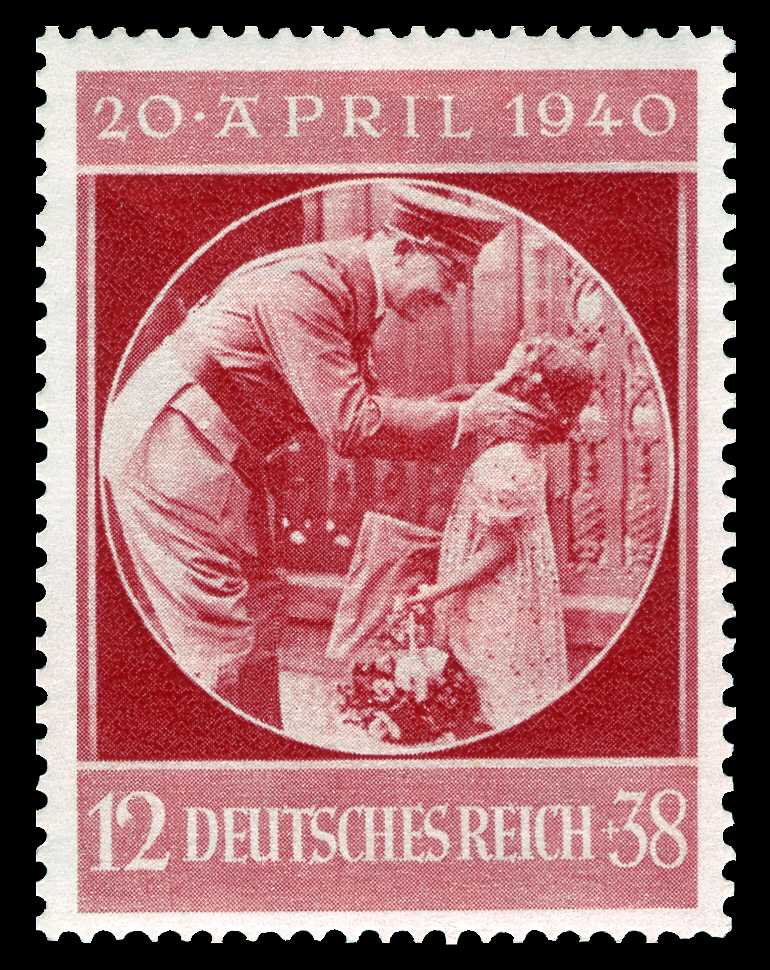
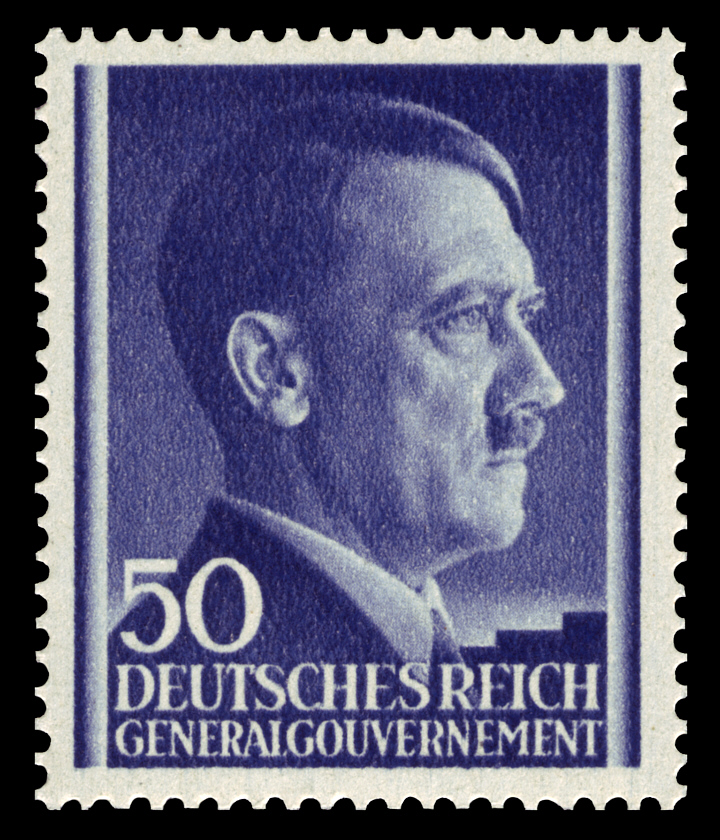
Images of Hitler on stamps were common during Nazi Germany.

The cult of leader was evidenced in Nazi propaganda films by Leni Riefenstahl, such as 1935's Triumph of the Will, which Hitler ordered to be made. The film showed the 1934 Nuremberg Rally, which was attended by over 700,000 supporters, and is one of the first examples of the Hitler myth filmed and put into full effect during Nazi Germany. The mysticism is evident from the start when Hitler begins to descend from the clouds in an airplane, and as the rally finishes with a climax uniting Hitler, the Nazi Party, and the German people, with Rudolf Hess saying, "The Party is Hitler. But Hitler is Germany, just as Germany is Hitler. Hitler! Sieg Heil!" Those Germans who watched the film were exposed to the full force of the Führer myth.

In 1934, Hitler's chosen successor, Hermann Göring, said, "There is something mystical, inexpressible, almost incomprehensible about this one man. ... We love Adolf Hitler because we believe, deeply and steadfastly, that he was sent to us by God to save Germany. ... There is no quality that he does not possess to the highest degree. ... For us the Führer is simply infallible in all matters political and all other issues concerning the national and social interest of the people".

Nazi propaganda relentlessly aimed to persuade Germans to have faith and confidence in the ideas of Hitler. The extent of how images of Hitler were used in Nazi propaganda was summarised in 1941 when a Nazi newsreel stated that "a newsreel without pictures of the Führer was not regarded as up to standard".

British historian Ian Kershaw's book The "Hitler Myth": Image and Reality in the Third Reich was published in 1987. In it, he wrote:

Hitler stood for at least some things they [German people] admired, and for many had become the symbol and embodiment of the national revival which the Third Reich had in many respects been perceived to accomplish.

Although the political ideology of Nazism mattered to Hitler himself, many Nazi Party members were indifferent to it, since to the majority of them he was the embodiment of Nazism.

== Führerprinzip ==
The Führerprinzip ("leader principle") was the fundamental basis of political authority in Nazi Germany. This principle can be most succinctly understood to mean that "the Führer's word is above all written law" and that governmental policies, decisions, and offices ought to work toward the realisation of this end. The principle also extended to the leadership of other organizations, who were expected to have the last word in their purviews.

The Wochenspruch der NSDAP wall newspaper published on December 22, 1940: "The Führer commands: Believe, obey, and fight!"

The Führerprinzip was given credence during the Night of Long Knives in 1934 when Hitler ordered a number of extrajudicial executions because of an alleged imminent coup by the SA under Ernst Röhm – the so-called "Röhm Putsch". Hitler gave a speech at the Reichstag and said, "The National Socialist State will wage a Hundred Years’ War, if necessary, to stamp out and destroy every last trace within its boundaries of this phenomenon which poisons and makes dupes of the Volk (Volksvernarrung)" and argued that "in this hour, I was responsible for the fate of the German nation and was therefore the supreme judge of the German people!" Nazi propaganda claimed that Hitler's actions had saved Germany.

== Führer Myth ==
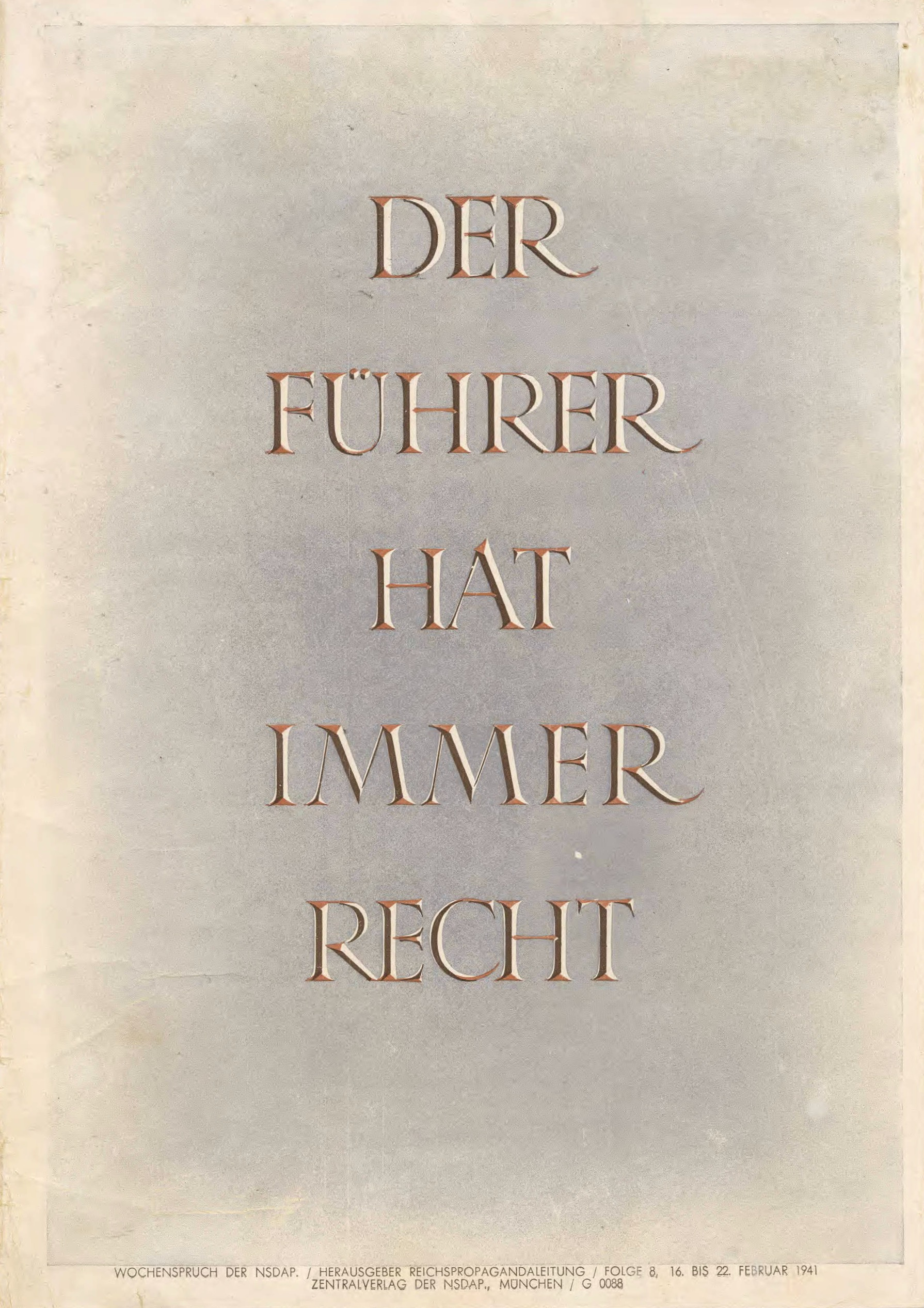
The Wochenspruch der NSDAP wall newspaper published on February 16, 1941: "The Führer is always right."

The "Führer Myth" utilized propaganda and the Führerprinzip to portray Hitler as an infallible genius who was above party politics, and was totally dedicated to protecting and saving the German people from both insidious outside forces, such as "Jewish Bolshevism", and from internal factors such as conservative, centrist and liberal politics and politicians who supported democracy and were the backbone of the Weimar Republic. To a lesser extent, religion was included in the Nazi's litany of destructive internal forces, but because the German people – both Protestants and Roman Catholics – were very attached to their religious beliefs, this aspect of Nazi ideology was soft-pedaled, and its presentation was inconsistent.

The power of the myth was so embedded into German society that the ballot cards for elections and plebiscites in the early 1930s did not refer to the "Nazi Party" but rather the "Hitler Movement". Although "National Socialism" had been used by other political parties before the rise of the Nazis, Nazism was Hitlerism in simple terms.

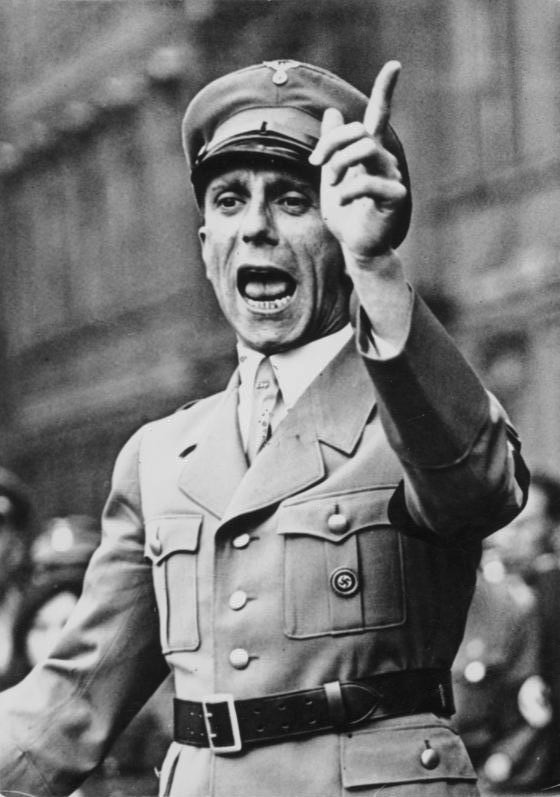
Nazi Propaganda Minister Joseph Goebbels stated in 1941 that one of his greatest achievements was creating the Führer myth.

During the 1930s, Hitler's popularity was largely due to the Führer myth being accepted by a majority of Germans. Most Germans sought recovery, security and prosperity, and Hitler seemed to offer all of those things. Most Germans approved of his socio-economic policies and the draconian measures against those regarded as "enemies" of the state because the Nazis appeared to have the solutions to all of Germany's problems. The Führer myth enabled the Schutzstaffel (SS) to carry out terror among the German population, because it went largely unnoticed, due to the enthusiasm for Hitler and the Nazi regime. The myth helped Germans to view Hitler as a statesman who was determined to "save" Germany from the scourge of "Jewish Bolshevism", which is how the Nazis and other ultra-nationalists referred to Marxism and communism. To some extent, the myth contributed to Germans accepting or overlooking the Nazi's policies towards Jews.

Hitler himself – along with Joseph Goebbels – was a significant contributor to the creation of the myth. Hitler understood the importance of propaganda and the need to create an aura about himself. Reflecting on the claims he had made in 1933 to the German people, Hitler said in 1938:

The German people should once again examine what I and my comrades have done in the five years since the first Reichstag election in March 1933. They will have to agree that the results have been unique in all history.

Joseph Goebbels told officials at the Propaganda Ministry in 1941 that his two greatest achievements were "the style and technique of the Party's public ceremonies; the ceremonial of the mass demonstrations, the ritual of the great Party occasion" and the "creation of the myth, Hitler had been given the halo of infallibility, with the result that many people who looked askance at the Party after 1933 had now complete confidence in Hitler". The most important theme of Nazi propaganda was the cult of the leader, portraying Hitler as a charismatic leader who had saved Germany.

The Führer myth, along with the Führerprinzip, helped to curb internal crises within the Nazi Party, as Hitler himself asserted in 1935; "No, gentlemen. The Führer is the Party and the Party is the Führer". The myth also lent to the legitimacy of Nazism as a political ideology abroad. Although it was not the case, the myth gave credence to the idea that the Nazis had managed to integrate all Germans in society. The extent that the myth had penetrated into German society meant that it was nearly impossible for any German who read a newspaper, listened to a radio or watched any films to avoid it, since the Nazis owned all of the media and they determined what Germans were able to read and watch.

The Führer myth was a double-sided phenomenon. On the one hand, Nazi propaganda worked continuously to convey an image of Hitler as a heroic figure who made all of the right choices. On the other hand, it can be seen as observation of value-systems and ethics which subscribed to a "supreme" leadership.

The cult of leadership surrounding Hitler also served to prevent the Nazi Party from fragmenting into warring factions, especially after Hitler had eliminated his rivals Ernst Röhm and Gregor Strasser in the purge of 1934. With the Führer as the embodiment of the Party's ideology and the people's hopes for national salvation, held blameless by the public when things went badly, it was virtually impossible for any of Hitler's paladins to attempt to replace him via a palace coup.

=== Economic aspects ===
After World War I, the Weimar Republic of Germany was hit hard by hyperinflation and the Great Depression which followed it. Many Germans had difficulty separating the German loss of the war from the unrelated effects of the economic collapse which followed, and, in a country with no history of democracy, tended to blame the conditions laid down by the Allies in the Treaty of Versailles and the novel governmental form of democracy in a republic for their economic woes, instead of looking at the root cause, which was world-wide economic conditions. When Weimar was not able to offer them the relief they needed, they started to look for a champion who could fix things, one who also did not believe in democracy or republican government, and who offered what appeared to be solutions to Germany's economic problems.

Without the apparent economic successes of the early 1930s, it is highly unlikely that the Hitler myth would have been able to penetrate so far into German society. The irony of this is that what economic successes occurred were not Hitler's doing. Relief from Germany's onerous war reparations – which had been lessened by the Dawes Plan in 1925, the Young Plan in 1929, and the Hoover Moratorium in 1931, and were canceled by the Lausanne Conference of 1932 – was due to much careful negotiating and diplomacy by Germany's long-term Foreign Minister Gustav Stresemann before his death in 1929, and afterwards by Chancellor Heinrich Brüning. The massive public-works program, for instance, which brought down unemployment by two million in early 1933 was instituted by Brüning's successor, and Hitler's predecessor, Chancellor Kurt von Schleicher, 48 hours before he left office; Hitler merely got to take credit for von Schleicher's program. Moreover, globally, the Great Depression was slowly giving way by the mid-1930s, although some of its negative effects lasted until the beginning of World War II. The one aspect of Germany's economic recovery after Hitler took office which he could legitimately take credit for, was the effect – both positive and negative – on the German economy of massive spending for rearmament, including the wholesale expansion of the army, the building of new battleships and U-boats, and the creation from whole cloth of the Luftwaffe, the German air force.

The working class was the least susceptible to the Hitler myth since they still had low wages and longer working hours. Nevertheless, the "socialist" appeal of Nazism ensured some amount of support from German workers, who benefited from the Winter Relief campaigns. The middle class benefited the most from the apparent economic successes and despite their criticisms, at least until the middle of the war, they remained the most firm supporters of Hitler and the Nazi regime.

=== Foreign policy and military aspects ===
Hitler was regarded as the unique force behind the Nazi movement and someone who transcended party politics and aimed to unite all Germans into a people's community (Volksgemeinschaft). Despite criticism of the Nazi regime being apparent during the 1930s, Hitler's early successful foreign policies, reversing the restrictions of the Treaty of Versailles and uniting all ethnic Germans under one state led to Hitler's popularity soaring, which enhanced the myth.

Although it remains unknown how many Germans genuinely believed in the Führer myth, even those Germans who were critical of Hitler and the Nazi regime believed in it by the late 1930s. Most Germans had been impressed by the apparent successes of the Nazi regime, which were all attributed to Hitler himself. For example, in 1938 after the Anschluss one report by the Social Democratic Party of Germany concluded:

The Führer's foreign-policy statements strike a chord with many workers too; especially with young people. The firm stand the Führer has taken over the occupation of the Rhineland has been universally impressive. Many people are convinced that Germany's foreign-policy demands are justified and cannot be passed over. The last few days have been marked by [a] big fresh advance in the Führer's personal reputation, including among workers. There is no mistaking the enormous personal gains in credibility and prestige that Hitler has made, mainly perhaps among workers. The fact that Austria was subjugated by force has had little or no effect so far on the way the event is being judged here. The crucial point is that Austria has been annexed; not how. On the contrary, it is being taken for granted that the annexation was carried out with violence, since almost all the major successes of the system have been achieved with the use of violent methods.

Up until 1938, the myth helped to convince most Germans that Hitler was a politician of conviction who was standing up for Germany's rights. Before the start of World War II, the Führer myth was almost complete, but it was still missing an important trait: Hitler being a military genius. Even before the start of the war, the Nazi propaganda machine was working towards portraying that image to the German people. This was preceded by the myth of Hitler's diplomatic and foreign policy genius, which was spawned by his triumphs in the remilitarisation of the Rhineland, the Anschluss with Austria, being given the Sudetenland by the Western powers in Munich, and the bloodless invasion and partition of Czechoslovakia. By the lead-up to the Invasion of Poland, foreign minister Joachim von Ribbentrop was threatening to execute anyone on his staff who doubted Hitler's prediction that Poland would collapse in days and that England would not intervene on its behalf.

On Hitler's 50th birthday on April 20, 1939, the military parade was aimed to portray him as "the future military leader, taking muster of his armed forces". After the war began on September 1, 1939, the image of Hitler being a supreme war leader and a military genius came to dominate the myth more than any other aspect of it. Although many Germans were worried about the aspect of another war, once the war began, there was a development in the myth.

The early successes brought about a deeper level of emotional attachment because he was said to have represented the national community and national greatness, and that he was going to turn Germany into a world power. The euphoria only lasted while triumphs continued, but once they stopped then the emotional attachment was lost.

=== Legal aspects ===
Beginning in 1934–35, the Führer myth began to determine the constitutional law of Nazi Germany. Nazi lawyer Hans Frank stated, "Constitutional Law in the Third Reich is the legal formulation of the historic will of the Führer, but the historic will of the Führer is not the fulfilment of legal preconditions for his activity."

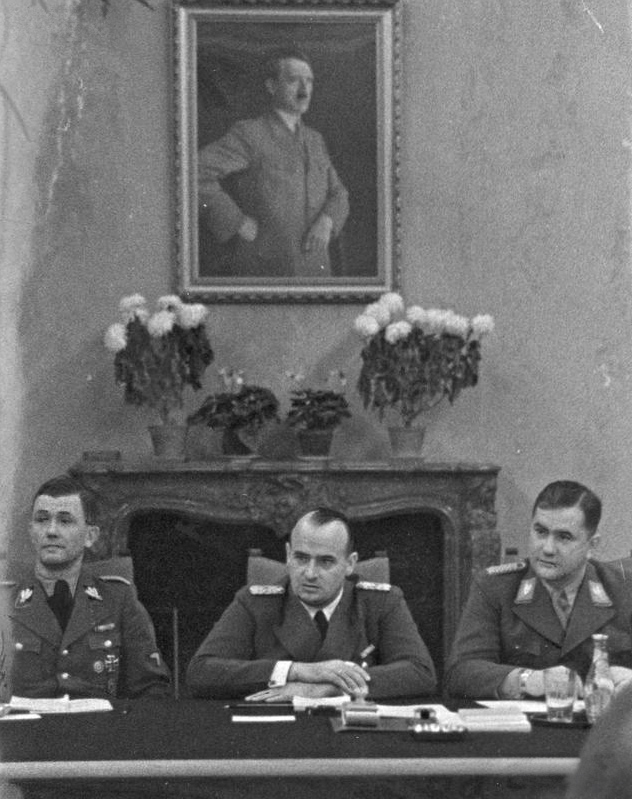
Hans Frank (center) was one of the main lawyers who implemented Hitler's will as the law of Nazi Germany.

As early as March 23, 1933, Hitler declared that the primary reason for the law was so that "our judiciary must, first and foremost, serve the preservation of the Volk community", that "the flexibility of judgements calculated to serve the preservation of society must be appropriate in light of the fixed tenure of the judges" and warned that, "in the future, state and national treason will be annihilated with barbaric ruthlessness".

Shortly after Hitler had merged the two positions of Chancellor and President into one to create the position "Führer and chancellor", Frank gave a speech on September 10, 1934, and announced the implementation of Hitler's will as the law:

The Führer announced that National Socialism would greatly transform the German legal system in the party program of 1920. We formulated the first principles at that time, demanding the replacement of law that served a materialistic worldview foreign to us and its replacement with German law. Now that the Führer with his movement and party have taken power in the German Reich and its provinces, it is essential to implement National Socialist principles of justice. Today, just as National Socialism has taken over the political, economic, and cultural life of the nation and formed them according to its irrevocable program, it is also necessary to have a breakthrough in law to fill it with National Socialist thinking. [...] As everywhere else in government, the party and its ideas must guide justice since it is only a means of the Führer for the realisation of National Socialism. [...] As leader of the German legal professionals I can say that the foundation of the National Socialist State is the National Socialist legal system, and that for us our supreme leader is also the supreme judge and that his will is now the foundation of our legal system. Since we know how holy the foundations of our legal system are to the Führer, we and our people’s comrades can be sure: Your life and your existence are secure in this National Socialist state of order, freedom, and justice.

— Hans Frank on the Nazi takeover of and the implementation of Hitler's will as the law in 1934

The various racial definitions of "Aryan", "German blood" and so on that were used during Nazi Germany were all said to be determined by Hitler himself which prompted Nazi author Andreas Veit to write that "All with a truly German sense know to thank the Führer". Nazi experts on the law in Nazi Germany described it as a "Führer state" to convey the notion that the will of the German people was determined by Hitler's will.

On April 26, 1942, Hitler gave a speech to the Reichstag in which he declared himself to be the supreme judge of the German people, the survival of the German people was not to be bound by any legal matters, he would intervene when sentences did not match the severity of the crimes and declared that, "I will take a hand in these cases from now on and direct the order to the judges that they recognise that as right what I order". The speech was met with a thunderous applause by those who were present. Shortly afterwards, a decree was issued by the Reichstag which stated:

There can be no doubt that the Fuhrer [sic] must during the present time of war in which the German Volk is engaged in a battle for life or death, have the right which has been assumed by him, to do everything that serves the achievement of victory or contributes thereto. The Fuhrer, therefore, must – without being bound by existing rules of law – in his capacity as Fuhrer of the Nation, as Supreme Commander of the Armed Forces, as Chief of the Government, and as supreme possessor of executive powers, as supreme lord of the judiciary, and as Fuhrer of the Party, at any time be in a position to order, if necessary, any German – be he a common soldier or officer, low-class or high-class officer or judge, executive or ministerial functionary of the Party, laborer or employer – with all means which he deems suitable, to fulfill his duties, and to visit him, in case of violation of these duties, after conscientious examination, with the punishment which is due to him, without regard to so-called vested rights, and to remove him from office, from his rank, and his position without the institution of prescribed procedures.

On August 28, 1942, Hitler issued a decree which enabled Nazi jurist Otto Georg Thierack to do whatever was necessary to coerce judges to toe the line with Hitler's thinking and guidelines on matters. Thus, legal procedures were made to match Hitler's will.

=== Religious aspects ===
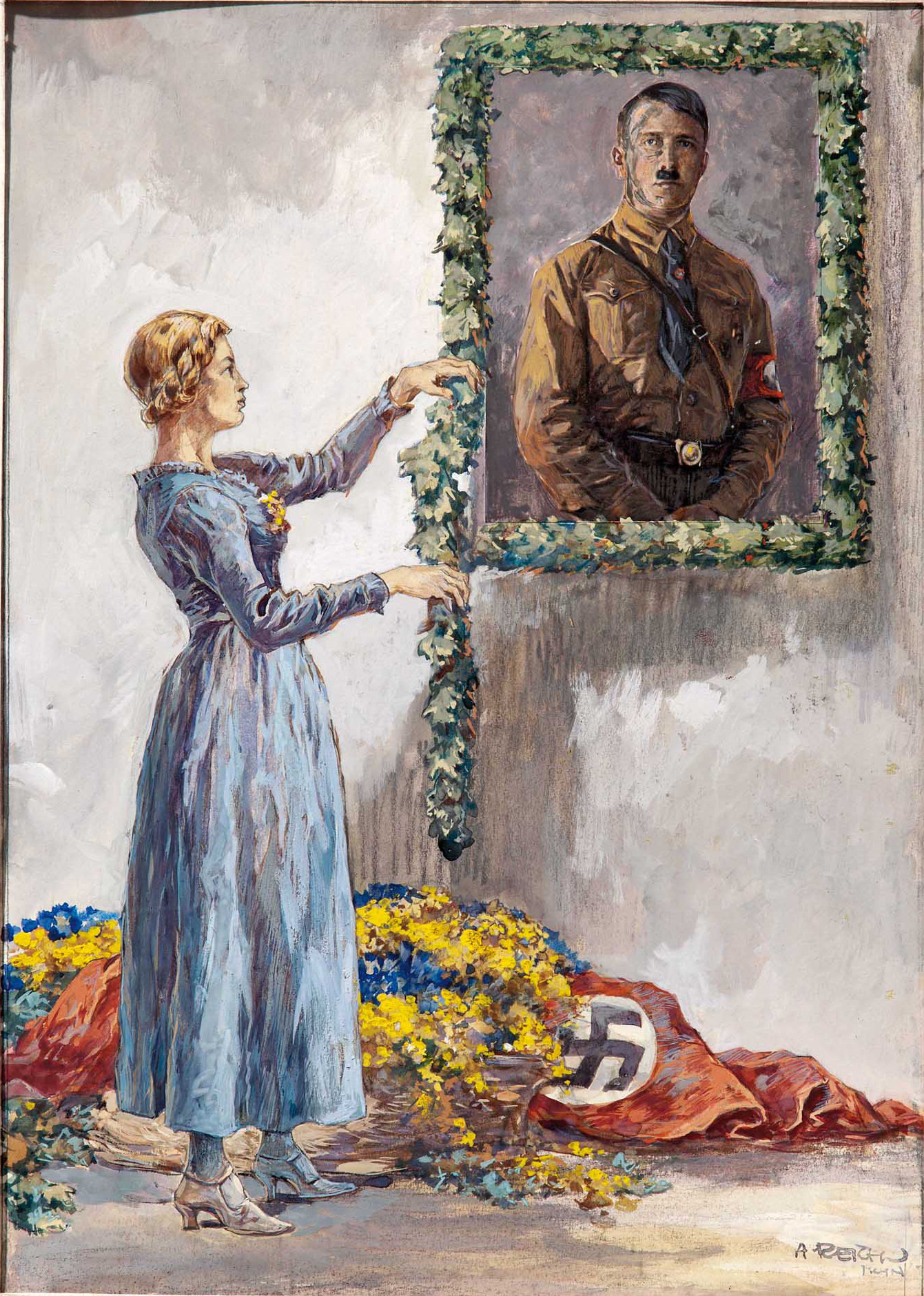
A painting of Hitler by Albert Reich

Hitler often used religious terms in his speeches, such as the "resurrection" of the German people and finished his speeches with "Amen". The 24th point of the Nazi 25-point Program stated that the Nazi Party advocated "positive Christianity", and Hitler emphasised his commitment to Christianity to the Catholic Centre Party to persuade them to vote for the Enabling Act of 1933. In reality, many Nazis – such as Alfred Rosenberg and Martin Bormann – were deeply opposed to religion and were anti-Christian. After gaining complete power they pursued an attack on the church ("Kirchenkampf"), especially against the Catholic Church. The primary reason that Hitler and the Nazis did not openly advocate anti-Christian views before gaining power was because they knew that it would have alienated so many Germans, since the vast majority of them were religious to some extent. During Nazi Germany, German children were told that Hitler was "sent from God" and that he was their "faith" and "light", which portrayed him as a divine prophet rather than a normal politician.

During the 1930s, Hitler began to speak in mystical terms when talking to German "national comrades". After the Nazi remilitarisation of the Rhineland in March 1936, Hitler declared, "I go the way that Providence dictates with the assurance of a sleepwalker". In May 1936 in Lustgarten, he said, "We are so fortunate to be able to live amongst these people, and I am proud to be your Führer. So proud that I cannot imagine anything in this world capable of convincing me to trade it for something else. I would sooner, a thousand times sooner, be the last national comrade among you than a king anywhere else. And this pride fills me today above all". Hitler identified himself with the German people in September 1936 when he said, "That you have found me... among so many millions is the miracle of our time! And that I have found you, that is Germany's fortune!"

== Loyalty and devotion ==
Different types of devotion were used to cement the cult of the leader and the German people in Nazi propaganda.

I swear to God this holy oath
that I shall render unconditional obedience
to the Leader of the German Reich and people,
Adolf Hitler, supreme commander of the armed forces,
and that as a brave soldier I shall at all times be prepared
to give my life for this oath.

— Wehrmacht Oath of Loyalty to Adolf Hitler

I swear: I will be faithful and obedient
to the leader of the German Reich and people, Adolf Hitler,
to observe the law, and to conscientiously fulfill my official duties, so help me God!

— Public servants Oath to Adolf Hitler

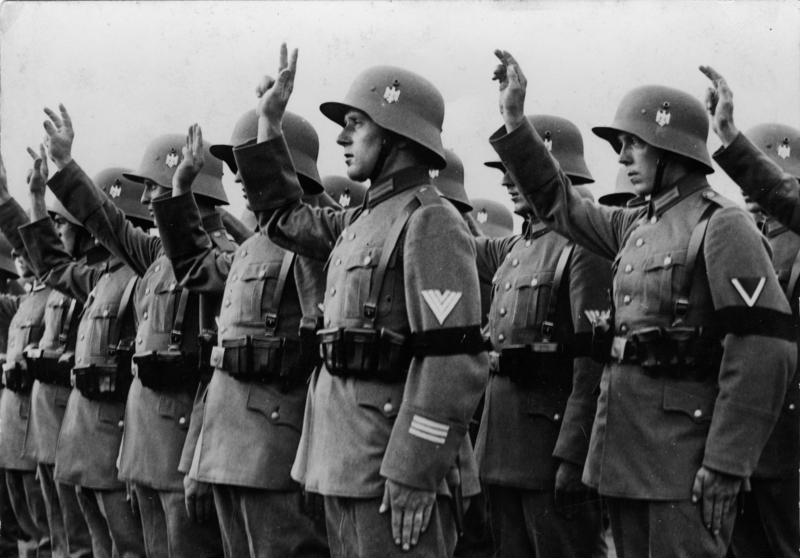
Soldiers in the Reichswehr swearing the Hitler oath in 1934, with hands raised in the traditional schwurhand gesture

One key aspect of the myth was personal obedience to Hitler himself. After the death of German President Paul von Hindenburg on August 2, 1934, Hitler decided to merge the offices of President and Chancellor, and declared himself to be "Führer und Reichskanzler" ("Leader and Reich Chancellor"). Shortly afterwards, War Minister Werner von Blomberg issued an order that all military personnel, who had previously sworn an oath to Germany, would instead swear an oath of allegiance and binding loyalty to Hitler personally. Civil servants were also required to swear such an oath.

The "Heil Hitler" salute, which was made compulsory for all Nazi Party members and, later, for civil servants and the military, was a symbol of total devotion to Hitler.

Between 1933 and 1945, roughly 4,000 cities and towns made Hitler an honorary citizen as a way to show loyalty to him. Since the end of World War II, many of them have revoked the decision.

Hitler deliberately kept his private life from the German public as a way to ensure his popularity, especially to German women. When questioned why he did not have a wife, he would reply, "I am married to Germany". German women genuinely believed that he was celibate and was devoted to Germany. Many German women idolized him and wrote to him, often in an erotic manner. Thousands of German women would wait outside of his Berghof home at the Obersalzberg just to get a glimpse of him; once they saw him, many would become hysterical and would shout to him things such as "Mein Führer, I would like to have a child by you!" Many of the women also tried to get close enough to him to kiss him, but were stopped and dragged away by his bodyguards. Hitler's relationship with his mistress, Eva Braun, remained a closely guarded secret, because Hitler believed that if women knew he had a wife, he would lose his appeal to them.

== Hitler and German youth ==
Nazi propaganda indoctrinated German youth, especially the members of the Hitler Youth. They were told that they all belonged to one classless people's community, and their group identity was reinforced through communal marching, singing and camping. Hitler was depicted as their father figure who would always protect them. The Nazis were able to convey the image that they were the protectors of the youth who would offer them prosperity and safety. Owing to the intense propaganda, the Nazis were able to control both public and private attitudes and behavior of the youth. Young Germans were heavily indoctrinated with racial theories and the supposed supremacy of the German Volk. The German youth were the most susceptible to the emotional appeal of the Hitler myth. Eleven year olds entering the Deutsches Jungvolk were told on their first day of induction, "from today onwards your life belongs to the Führer".

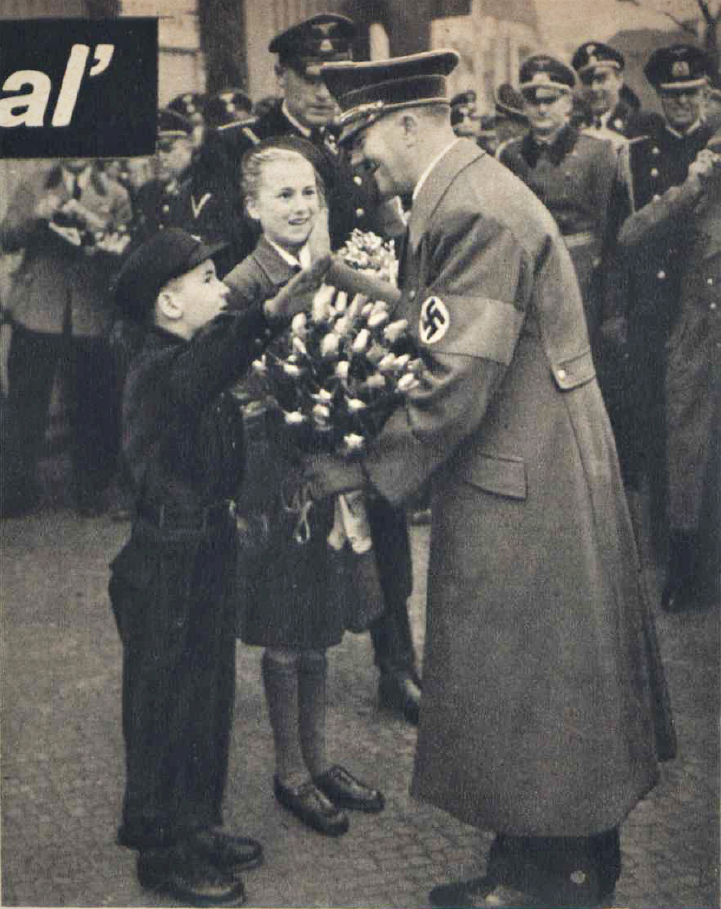
Hitler being given flowers by members of the Hitler Youth

Heinrich Hoffmann, who was Hitler's personal photographer, published the book Youth Around Hitler (Jugend um Hitler) in 1934, which was intended to show that Hitler cared about children.

Hitler's charismatic oratory had a great appeal among German youth. A former member of the Hitler Youth, Alfons Heck, wrote in his book:

We erupted into a frenzy of nationalistic pride that bordered on hysteria. For minutes on end, we shouted at the top of our lungs, with tears streaming down our faces: Sieg Heil, Sieg Heil, Sieg Heil! From that moment on, I belonged to Adolf Hitler body and soul.

As depicted in the Triumph of the Will, Hitler gave a speech to the Hitler Youth at Nuremberg and said, "We want to be a united nation, and you, my youth, are to become this nation. In the future, we do not wish to see classes and castes, and you must not allow them to develop among you. One day, we want to see one nation".

German boys and girls who wished to join the Hitler Youth had to declare, "I swear, in the Hitler Youth, always to do my duty with love and loyalty, for the Führer and our flag. So help me God." Afterwards, they were made to declare that they would die for Hitler:

In the presence of this blood banner which represents our fuhrer, I swear to devote all my energies and my strength to the savior of our country, Adolf Hitler. I am willing and ready to give up my life for him, so help me God.

— Hitler Youth Oath to Adolf Hitler

Nazi propaganda indoctrinated Hitler Youth members to denounce anyone who showed any form of criticism about the Nazi regime. They were told that they were racially superior, and over time this engendered an open feeling of arrogance towards those whom they regarded as inferior. They were indoctrinated in racial myths about Aryan superiority, that they belonged to a master race, and that the Jews were an inferior race who destroyed cultures. The Nazis required all schools to teach a study about a supposed superior German culture which emphasised Teutonic superiority and encouraged the youth to become educated on German history, literature, things related to the Nordic race, preservation of their Aryan ancestry and devotion to Germany.

Baldur von Schirach, the leader of the Hitler Youth, generally presented Hitler in a quasi-religious way. During a speech he said, "We do not need intellectual leaders who create new ideas because the superimposing leader of all the desires of youth is Adolf Hitler"." Schirach exclaimed, "Your name, my Führer, is the happiness of youth, your name, my Führer, is for us everlasting life". During the Anschluss with Austria in 1938, he told members of the Hitler Youth, "Yes, mein Führer, He who serves Adolf Hitler, the Führer, serves Germany, whoever serves Germany, serves God" and, "When we lead the youth to Germany, we lead it to God".

Hitler believed that in time he could turn the youth into Nazis when they grew older, as he claimed in 1938, when he said:

These boys and girls enter our organisations with their ten years of age, and often for the first time get a little fresh air; after four years of the Young Folk they go on to the Hitler Youth, where we have them for another four years . . . And even if they are still not complete National Socialists, they go to Labor Service and are smoothed out there for another six, seven months . . . And whatever class consciousness or social status might still be left . . . the Wehrmacht will take care of that.

Hitler Youth members remained loyal to Hitler even when their parents were becoming critical of him during the war. In 1943, when the Germans started to suffer military defeats, SS Security Service (SD) reports suggest that many Hitler Youth members were no longer showing faith in the Nazi Party, but distinguished the Party from Hitler; one report noted that, "The Führer is not the representative of the Party, but in the first instance Führer of the State and above all Supreme Commander of the Wehrmacht". Nevertheless, the Führer myth began to wane even among German youth, where it had been the strongest, when Germany's defeat became palpable and inevitable.

== End of the cult ==
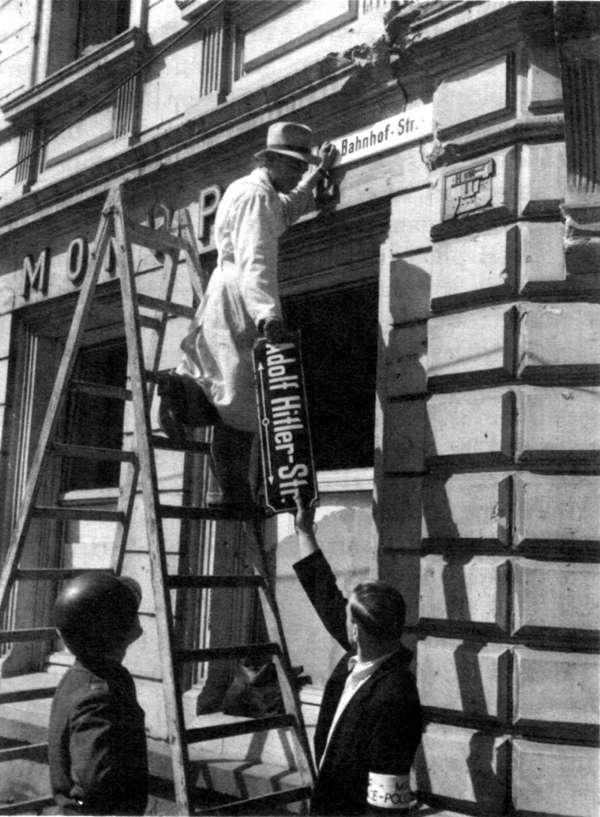
Workers removing the signage from a former "Adolf Hitler-Straße" (today "Steinbrückstraße") in Trier, Germany, on May 12, 1945

Even before the start of World War II, the myth was already beginning to be noticed, but it was not until nearer the end of the war that it became fully exposed to the German people. The Minister of Armaments and War Production Albert Speer wrote in his memoir Inside the Third Reich that in 1939 there was a sense that the myth was waning since the Nazis had to organize cheering crowds to turn up to speeches:

The shift in the mood of the population, the drooping morale which began to be felt throughout Germany in 1939, was evident in the necessity to organise cheering crowds where two years earlier Hitler had been able to count on spontaneity. What is more, he himself had meanwhile moved away from the admiring masses. He tended to be angry and impatient more often than in the past when, as still occasionally happened, a crowd on Wilhelmsplatz began clamoring for him to appear. Two years before he had often stepped out on the "historic balcony." Now he sometimes snapped at his adjutants when they came to him with the request that he show himself: "Stop bothering me with that!"

The Führer myth began to become exposed after Hitler launched Operation Barbarossa, the invasion of the Soviet Union, which he thought would last a little longer than six weeks. As time went on and Germany began to suffer consistent military defeats after the Battle of Stalingrad in 1943, the Führer myth began to unravel. The claim that Hitler was a military genius after his successful Blitzkrieg victories in the West started to come into question, although Hitler himself blamed the defeats on his generals. For the first time, Hitler now became personally blamed for starting the war. Hitler became more withdrawn and rarely spoke to the German people again. Goebbels attempted to portray Hitler as the equivalent of Frederick the Great, who would eventually triumph despite all of the setbacks; however, by this time, most Germans knew they were going to lose the war and Hitler's early appeal was almost entirely lost. The appeal of the Hitler myth remained strong among the German youth more than any other Germans, since they had been indoctrinated for over a decade by Nazi propaganda.

Nevertheless, hatred of the Allies for the terror caused by bombing campaigns, and promises of new wonder weapons which would ultimately win the war, prompted some Germans to remain faithful to Hitler for a short period of time. The failed assassination attempt of Hitler on July 20, 1944 also prompted an upsurge of loyalty to Hitler, although this was short-lived.

The Old Party fighters who had been keen supporters of Hitler during the 1920s were the last Germans to still strongly believe in the Führer myth, even when it was obvious that the war was lost. The fighters mainly consisted of people who had personally benefited from the Nazi regime in one way or another. The disillusionment towards Hitler remained flexible, depending on whether or not it seemed that a military victory appeared to be possible in the foreseeable future or not. Up until the end of Nazi Germany, there still remained some Nazis who had an "unshakeable belief" in the myth.

Following multiple military defeats, and when it became obvious to ordinary Germans that Germany was going to lose the war, the myth began to become exposed and Hitler's popularity began to wane. An example of this can be seen in a report given in the Bavarian town of Markt Schellenberg on March 11, 1945:

When the leader of the Wehrmacht unit at the end of his speech called for a Sieg Heil for the Führer, it was returned neither by the Wehrmacht present, nor by the Volkssturm, nor by the spectators of the civilian population who had turned up. This silence of the masses ... probably reflects better than anything else, the attitudes of the population.

American journalist Howard K. Smith wrote in his book Last Train from Berlin:

I was convinced that of all the millions on whom the Hitler Myth had fastened itself, the most carried away was Adolf Hitler, himself.

According to historian Lisa Pine, during the last phase of World War II, the Führer myth "collapsed entirely". Few German civilians mourned Hitler's suicide in 1945 since they were too busy dealing with the collapse of Germany or fleeing from the fighting. According to Hitler biographer John Toland, Nazism "burst like a bubble" without its leader.

== See also ==
- Joseph Stalin's cult of personality
- Mao Zedong's cult of personality
