= The Penguin History of Europe =

Book series about the History of Europe

The Penguin History of Europe is a popular book series about the history of Europe, published by Penguin Books.

The series includes:

1. The Birth of Classical Europe: A History from Troy to Augustine (2011) by Simon Price and Peter Thonemann
2. The Inheritance of Rome: Illuminating the Dark Ages 400-1000 (2010) by Chris Wickham
3. Europe in the High Middle Ages (2004) by William Chester Jordan
4. Renaissance Europe (Forthcoming) by Anthony Grafton
5. Christendom Destroyed: Europe 1517–1648 (2015) by Mark Greengrass
6. The Pursuit of Glory: Europe 1648–1815 (2008) by Tim Blanning
7. The Pursuit of Power: Europe 1815–1914 (2017) by Richard J. Evans
8. To Hell and Back: Europe 1914–1949 (2015) by Ian Kershaw
9. Rollercoaster: Europe 1950–2017 (2019) by Ian Kershaw

== See also ==
- Penguin History of Britain (1996–2018)
- The Oxford History of Modern Europe (1954—)
