= To Hell and Back (Kershaw book) =

2015 book by Ian Kershaw

To Hell and Back: Europe 1914–1949
- First US edition
- Author: Ian Kershaw
- Series: The Penguin History of Europe
- Subject: History of Europe
- Published: 24 September 2015 (UK)
- Publisher: Allen Lane (UK); Viking Press (US)
- Pages: 624
- ISBN: 978-0-713-99089-8
- Preceded by: The Pursuit of Power: Europe 1815–1914, by Richard J. Evans
- Followed by: The Global Age: Europe 1950–2017, by Ian Kershaw

To Hell and Back: Europe 1914–1949 is a book on the history of Europe, written by Ian Kershaw. An installment in The Penguin History of Europe series, it spans the period from the outbreak of World War I until the aftermath of World War II and the beginning of the Cold War. Kershaw refers to the 35-year period as "Europe's era of self-destruction".

== Content ==
The book begins with the end of the Belle Époque upon the outbreak of World War I. It covers the war and its aftermath, which was marked by further wars in Eastern Europe, the collapse of democracy in many countries including Italy and a series of economic crises which culminated in the occupation of the Ruhr. This was then followed by a prosperous period in the 1920s which then gave way to the protracted Great Depression. This period saw the rise of further dictatorships, notably Nazi Germany, which in turn became the cause of World War II and the Holocaust. The book continues for four further years to cover its aftermath and the beginning of the Cold War. The book additionally covers cultural and social developments within that time.

Kershaw argues that four key factors were the driving forces behind the instability of the era:

- Nationalism based around ethnicity or race
- "Bitter and irreconcilable" demands for territory
- Class conflict
- Severe economic crisis (the Great Depression)

These factors were generally more prevalent in Eastern Europe and to a lesser extent Southern Europe. Not one country in those regions had a functioning democracy on the eve of World War II. The factors were less prevalent in the northwest, where countries had a longer history of industrialisation, nationhood and parliamentary institutions. Kershaw describes Germany as the continent's "pivotal centre", due to its large population and central location.

The four factors had existed before World War I, but were seen in exacerbated forms afterwards. The collapse of the German, Austro-Hungarian, Ottoman and Russian monarchies led to large swathes of Central and Eastern Europe being subject to conflicting territorial claims. Kershaw argues that the rise of the Soviet Union deepened class conflicts and their associated political struggles. It split the European left between revolutionary communism and democratic socialism while galvanising their right-wing opposition.

Kershaw differentiates fascism from other right-wing regimes like the Estado Novo in Portugal and the White Terror in Bulgaria. Whereas most right-wing regimes essentially aimed "to conserve the existing social order", fascism sought to transform society and mobilise the whole population to its cause. Kershaw considers Fascist Italy and Nazi Germany to be the only countries where a true fascist regime came to power. He compares them with each other and the Soviet Union, the three "dynamic dictatorships" of Europe in the 1930s. The rise of a particularly dangerous brand of fascism in Germany was underpinned by the same trends that caused instability across Europe, but some of these were more potent in Germany, including grievances over the Treaty of Versailles, pan-Germanist desires to unite with other German-speaking peoples and the lack of longstanding political institutions.

== Reception ==
Writing in The Guardian, Tim Bouverie wrote that Kershaw "has achieved the remarkable feat of drawing together and comparing the histories of the entire continent, during its most turbulent years, into one highly readable volume. His thoughtful and comprehensive history is likely to become a classic." In The Sunday Times, Dominic Sandbrook wrote "Other historians' books on the same period may be flashier or more provocative. But to read Kershaw on Europe's bloody century is to be driven through a ravaged landscape in the sleek, smooth comfort of a Rolls-Royce..." Joanna Bourke, a professor of history at the Birkbeck, University of London writing in Prospect, said "Kershaw leads his readers through this complex history in a clear and compelling manner." Kirkus Reviews described the book as "An ambitious, dense, sometimes-difficult treatment of a vast topic" although it felt that his coverage of the aftermath of World War II was "less successful".
