= The Pursuit of Glory =

Non-fiction book by Tim Blanning

The Pursuit of Glory: Europe 1648-1815
- Cover of the first edition, published by Allen Lane
- Author: Tim Blanning
- Language: English
- Subject: History
- Genre: Non-fiction
- Publisher: Allen Lane, Penguin Books (UK and US); Viking Adult, Kindle Books (US)
- Publication date: April 26, 2007 (UK); January 1, 2007 (US)
- Pages: 736
- ISBN: 978-0-7139-9087-4 (Allen Lane hardback); ISBN 978-0-14-016667-5 (UK Penguin Books paperback); ISBN 978-0-670-06320-8 (Viking Adult hardback); ISBN 978-0-14-311389-8 (US Penguin Books paperback)

The Pursuit of Glory: Europe 1648–1815, written by the British historian Timothy Blanning, was first published by Allen Lane in 2007. It met with very favourable reviews, was The Sunday Times history book of the year, and was reprinted in paperback by Penguin Books in 2008.

== Editions and series ==
In the United States, a Kindle Books edition, The Pursuit of Glory: The Five Revolutions That Made Modern Europe, was released in 2007. This title was also chosen for the American Penguin Books paperback edition of 2008.

It is part of The Penguin History of Europe series. It was followed in 2016 by The Pursuit of Power: Europe, 1815–1914 by Richard J. Evans.

== Style and content ==
The book presents a multi-faceted history of Europe in the years 1648–1815. The contents, which give an indication of the wide range of subjects covered, read:

=== Contents ===
List of Illustrations

Maps:

1. Europe in the era of Louis XIV
2. Europe in the eighteenth century
3. Europe in 1809
4. Europe in 1815
5. The Holy Roman empire and the Habsburg Monarchy in the eighteenth century

Preface

Introduction

==== Part One: Life and Death ====
1. Communications

2. People

3. Trade and Manufacturing

4. Agriculture and the Rural World

==== Part Two: Power ====
5. Rulers and Their Elites

6. Reform and Revolution

==== Part Three: Religion and Culture ====
7. Religion and the Churches

8. Court and Country

9. Palace and Gardens

10. The Culture of Feeling and the Culture of Reason

==== Part Four: War and Peace ====
11. From the Peace of Westphalia to the Peace of Nystad

12. From the Peace of Nystad to the French Revolutionary Wars

13. The Wars of the French Revolution and Napoleon

Conclusion

Suggested Reading

Index

=== Style ===
Blanning does not use footnotes in this book. However, he frequently quotes and names other historians, incorporating their opinions and conclusions into his narrative. He links the vast international scholarship on the end of the Ancien Régime with his own assertions and hypothesis. On matters where there is much dispute amongst historians, Blanning informs the reader of the historiography, presenting the different viewpoints, while generally giving his own judgment on the matter at the end of the section. An example is the debate over the existence of the Industrial Revolution. The section An 'Industrial Revolution'?, in chapter 3. Trade and Manufacturing, for example, is a detailed discussion of the contrasting viewpoints, mainly whether or not there was indeed an industrial 'revolution'; and Blanning concludes that: 'the changes in commerce and manufacturing do deserve their revolutionary status. The world was transformed by industrialization, it did begin in Great Britain and it did begin in this period.'

== Reception ==
Reception to the book was extremely favourable. In Britain, it was chosen as The Sunday Times history book of the year. The Spectator called it 'outstanding', although it did state: 'I wish that Blanning would not keep quoting other historians, often for the most unremarkable statements, a habit which makes him sound at times like the compère of a variety show', The Daily Telegraph called it a 'triumph', The Guardian 'Sparkling...unfailingly accurate, good-humoured and often witty', The New York Times 'A page turner...history writing at its glorious best', and, finally, The Literary Review 'a jolly good read'.
