= Betty Kershaw =

English nursing administrator and academic (born 1943)

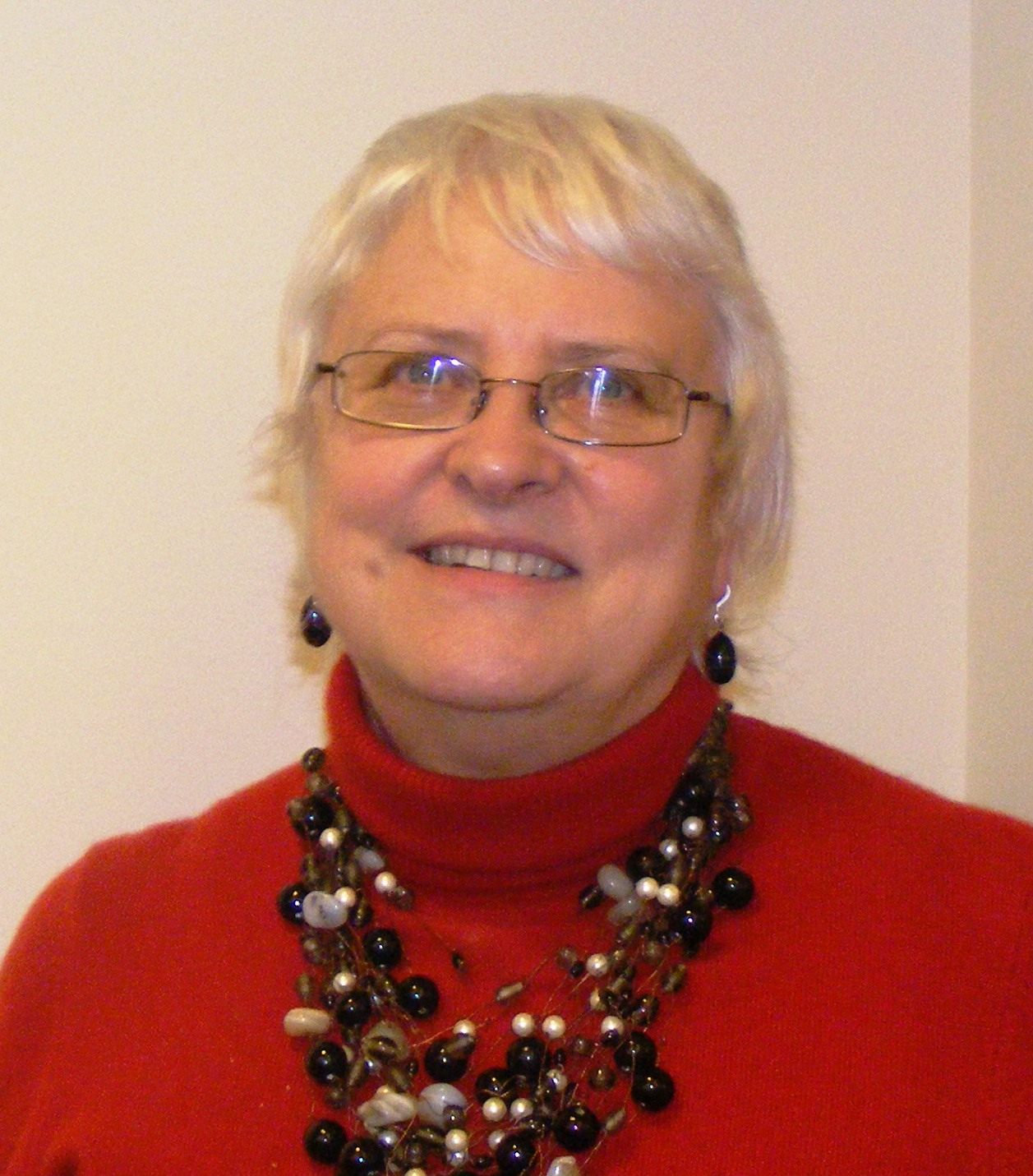
Betty Kershaw

Dame Janet Elizabeth Murray Kershaw DBE FRCN (née Gammie; born 11 December 1943) is an English nurse who served as professor of nursing and dean at the School of Nursing and Midwifery, University of Sheffield from 1999 to 2006.

She served as head of the Manchester College of Midwifery and Nursing, and the director of nursing education at the Stockport, Tameside and Glossop College of Nursing.

Kershaw received an honorary doctorate from Manchester University in 1995 in recognition of her contribution to nursing education. She was created Dame Commander of the Order of the British Empire (DBE) in 1998 for services to nursing and nursing education. Her international consultancy work for the Department of Health included projects in Colombia and China on the modernisation agenda for nursing, in Malta on the development of an EU curriculum of nursing, in Poland on Nursing Accession to the European community and for the Commonwealth Office on Managed Migration. Other commitments to the Department of Health included their Leadership Project advising on how the program developed ethnic minority nurses for leadership positions.

She was president of the Royal College of Nursing from 1994 to 1998, and was once employed as their education adviser. She was made a Fellow of the Royal College of Nursing (FRCN) in 2001 She was also St John Ambulance's chief nursing and social care officer.

== Personal life ==
Kershaw lives in Manchester and is married to historian Sir Ian Kershaw, with whom she has two sons.
