= The "Hitler Myth" =

Book by Ian Kershaw

The "Hitler Myth": Image and Reality in the Third Reich
- Cover of the 1989 Oxford paperback edition
- Author: Ian Kershaw
- Language: English
- Genre: Nonfiction
- Publisher: Clarendon Press
- Publication date: June 4, 1987
- Publication place: England

The "Hitler Myth": Image and Reality in the Third Reich is a book by British historian Ian Kershaw that was first published in 1987.

== Overview ==
In the book, Kershaw explores a concept he calls the "Hitler Myth" that describes two key points in Nazi ideology that depict Adolf Hitler as a demagogue figure and as a mighty defender. In the demagogue aspect Hitler is presented as a figure that embodies and shapes the German people, giving him a mandate to rule. As a defender, he is depicted as defending Germany against its enemies and redressing the imbalance imposed by the Treaty of Versailles. These were essential elements of propaganda of the time and helped to 'plaster over' early cracks in the Nazi Regime's facade, though by no means de-fusing all tensions or secret opposition in Germany at that time.

The myth of Hitler as the savior of Germany from conspiracies directed against it by the Soviet Union and the West – especially by the Third French Republic – was an extremely powerful tool in binding together the German people in loyalty, obedience, and subservience to the State. The German people were left embittered by the ineffective and unstable party politics of Weimar Germany which had failed to rescue its people or the economy from the humiliation administered by the Allies at the close of World War I.

Thus, as Kershaw states,

"Hitler stood for at least some things they [German people] admired, and for many had become the symbol and embodiment of the national revival which the Third Reich had in many respects been perceived to accomplish."

The myth was lent much credence by Hitler's huge successes in the regeneration of Germany's economy over just a few years, recovering it from what seemed like the unredeemable circumstances of the global Great Depression. In 1932, one year before Hitler's rise to power, unemployment had been at over five and a half million, but by 1938 German industry was producing at record levels, and unemployment was below 200,000 and real wages were up for the first time since authoritarianism.

The year 1938 accordingly saw a rise in Hitler's popularity, which dipped sharply with the outbreak of the Second World War. Only the victories in the West during 1940 revived it, and even then the campaign against the Soviet Union led to a dramatic decline in Hitler's popularity. According to Albert Speer, by around 1939 the Hitler Myth was under threat, with officials having to organise cheering crowds, presenting a stark contrast with Hitler's spontaneous crowds he could previously have relied on without any worries.

In his book Last Train from Berlin, Howard K. Smith wrote:

"I was convinced that of all the millions on whom the Hitler Myth had fastened itself, the most carried away was Adolf Hitler, himself."

== Reception ==
The book was reviewed in The English Historical Review, European History Quarterly, and Journal of European Studies.

== Editions ==
- Ian Kershaw (1987). The 'Hitler Myth'. Oxford University Press. ISBN 0-19-280206-2.
- Ian Kershaw (2001). The 'Hitler Myth'. Oxford University Press. ISBN 978-0192802064.

== See also ==
- Adolf Hitler's cult of personality
- Führerprinzip
