= Ian Kershaw =

English historian (born 1943)

Sir Ian Kershaw FRHistS FBA
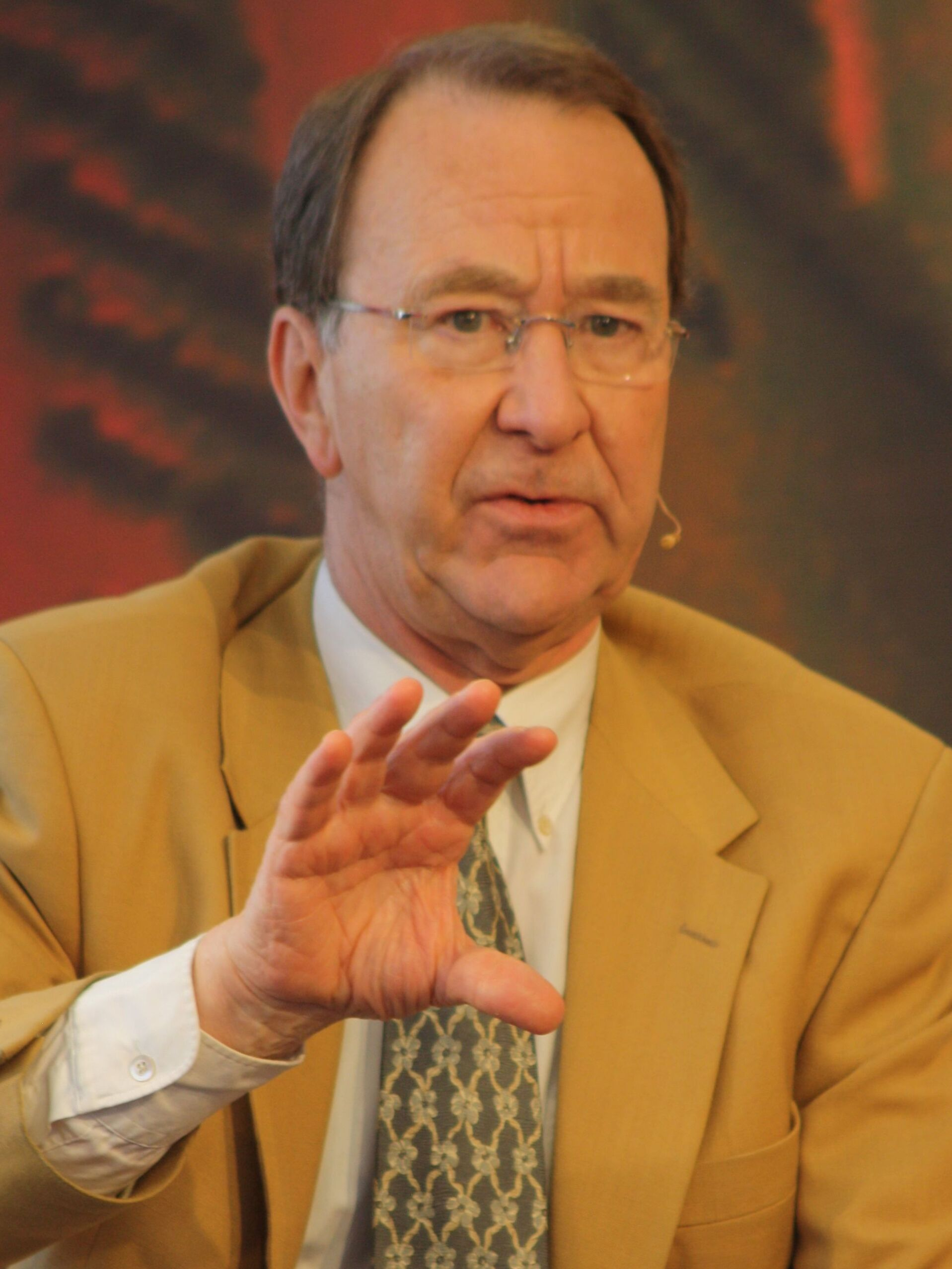
- Kershaw at the 2012 Leipzig Book Fair
- Born: 29 April 1943 (age 83); Oldham, Lancashire, England
- Spouse: Betty Gammie
- Children: 2
- Parents: Joseph Kershaw; Alice (Robinson) Kershaw

Academic background
- Education: University of Liverpool (BA); Merton College, Oxford (DPhil)
- Thesis: Bolton Priory, 1286–1325: An Economic Study (1969)
- Influences: Martin Broszat; Timothy Mason

Academic work
- Discipline: Social history
- School or tradition: Alltagsgeschichte
- Main interests: Nazi Germany
- Notable ideas: "Working Towards the Führer" theory

Sir Ian Kershaw (born 29 April 1943) is an English historian whose work has chiefly focused on the social history of 20th-century Germany. He is regarded by many as one of the world's foremost experts on Nazi Germany and noted for his biography of Adolf Hitler.

Kershaw worked at the University of Sheffield. He has called German historian Martin Broszat an "inspirational mentor" who did much to shape his understanding of Nazi Germany. Kershaw has served as historical adviser on numerous BBC documentaries, notably The Nazis: A Warning from History and War of the Century.

== Background ==
Ian Kershaw was born on 29 April 1943 in Oldham, Lancashire, England, to Joseph Kershaw, a musician, and Alice (Robinson) Kershaw. He was educated at Counthill Grammar School, St Bede's College, Manchester, where he was taught by Father Geoffrey Burke, the University of Liverpool (BA), and Merton College, Oxford (DPhil). He was originally trained as a medievalist but turned to the study of modern German social history in the 1970s.

At first, he was mainly concerned with the economic history of Bolton Abbey. As a lecturer in medieval history at Manchester, Kershaw learnt German to study the German peasantry in the Middle Ages. In 1972, he visited Bavaria and was shocked to hear the views of an old man he met in a Munich café who told him: "You English, you were so stupid, you should have been in the war with us. We'd have defeated the Bolsheviks and divided the world up between us." – adding in for good measure that "The Jew is a louse." As a result of this incident, Kershaw became keen to learn how and why ordinary people in Germany could support Nazism.

His wife, Dame Betty Kershaw, is a former professor of nursing and dean of the School of Nursing Studies at the University of Sheffield.

== Bavaria Project ==
In 1975, Kershaw joined Martin Broszat's "Bavaria Project". During his work, Broszat encouraged Kershaw to examine how ordinary people viewed Hitler. As a result of his work on the project, Kershaw wrote his first book on Nazi Germany, The "Hitler Myth": Image and Reality in the Third Reich, which was first published in German in 1980 as Der Hitler-Mythos: Volksmeinung und Propaganda im Dritten Reich. This book examined the "Hitler cult" in Germany, how it was developed by Joseph Goebbels, what social groups the Hitler Myth appealed to and how it rose and fell.

Also arising from the "Bavaria Project" and Kershaw's work in the field of Alltagsgeschichte ('everyday history') was Popular Opinion and Political Dissent in the Third Reich. In this 1983 book, Kershaw examined the experience of the Nazi era at the grass-roots in Bavaria. Kershaw showed how ordinary people reacted to the Nazi dictatorship, looking at how people conformed to the regime and to the extent and limits of dissent. Kershaw described his subjects as ordinary Bavarians:

the muddled majority, neither full-hearted Nazis nor outright opponents, whose attitudes at one and the same time betray signs of Nazi ideological penetration and yet show the clear limits of propaganda manipulation.

Kershaw went on to write in his preface:

I should like to think that had I been around at the time I would have been a convinced anti-Nazi engaged in the underground resistance fight. However, I know really that I would have been as confused and felt as helpless as most of the people I am writing about.

Kershaw argued that Goebbels failed to create the Volksgemeinschaft ('people's community') of Nazi propaganda, and that most Bavarians were far more interested in their day-to-day lives than in politics during the Third Reich. Kershaw concluded that the majority of Bavarians were either antisemitic or more commonly simply did not care about what was happening to the Jews. Kershaw also concluded that there was a fundamental difference between the antisemitism of the majority of ordinary people, who disliked Jews and were much coloured by traditional Catholic prejudices, and the ideological and far more radical völkische antisemitism of the Nazi Party, who hated Jews.

Kershaw found that the majority of Bavarians disapproved of the violence of the Kristallnacht pogrom, and that despite the efforts of the Nazis, continued to maintain social relations with members of the Bavarian Jewish community. Kershaw documented numerous campaigns on the part of the Nazi Party to increase antisemitic hatred, and noted that the overwhelming majority of antisemitic activities in Bavaria were the work of a small number of committed Nazi Party members. Overall, Kershaw noted that the popular mood towards Jews was indifference to their fate. Kershaw argued that during World War II, most Bavarians were vaguely aware of the Holocaust (known in Hebrew as the Shoah), but were vastly more concerned about, and interested in, the war than about the "Final Solution to the Jewish Question", making the notable claim that "the road to Auschwitz was built by hate, but paved with indifference."

Kershaw's assessment that most Bavarians, and by implication Germans, were indifferent to the Shoah faced criticism from the Israeli historian Otto Dov Kulka and the Canadian historian Michael Kater. Kater contended that Kershaw downplayed the extent of popular antisemitism, and that though admitting that most of the spontaneous antisemitic actions of Nazi Germany were staged, argued that because these actions involved substantial numbers of Germans, it is wrong to see the extreme antisemitism of the Nazis as coming solely from above.

Kulka argued that most Germans were more antisemitic than Kershaw portrayed them in Popular Opinion and Political Dissent in the Third Reich, and that rather than 'indifference', 'passive complicity' would be a better term to describe the reaction of the German people to the Shoah.

== The Nazi Dictatorship ==
In 1985, Kershaw published a book on the historiography of Nazi Germany, called The Nazi Dictatorship: Problems and Perspectives of Interpretation, in which he reflected on the problems in historiography of the Nazi era. Kershaw noted the huge disparity of often incompatible views about the Nazi era such as the debate between:

- those who see the Nazi period as the culmination of Deutschtum ('Germanism') and Marxists who see Nazism as the culmination of capitalism
- those who argue for a Sonderweg (distinct path of German post-medieval development), and those who argue against the Sonderweg concept
- those who see Nazism as a type of totalitarianism, and those who see it as a type of fascism
- those historians who favour a functionalist interpretation with the emphasis on the German bureaucracy and the Holocaust as an ad hoc process – the result of many small decisions – and those who favour an intentionalist interpretation with the focus on Hitler and that he planned the Holocaust early in his political career.

As Kershaw noted, these divergent interpretations such as the differences between the functionalist view of the Holocaust as caused by a process and the intentionalist view of the Holocaust as caused by a plan are not easily reconciled, and that there was in his opinion the need for a guide to explain the complex historiography surrounding these issues.

If one accepts the Marxist view of Nazism as the culmination of capitalism, then the Nazi phenomenon is universal, and fascism can come to power in any society where capitalism is the dominant economic system, whereas the view of Nazism as the culmination of Deutschtum means that the Nazi phenomenon is local and particular only to Germany. For Kershaw, any historian writing about the period had to take account of the "historical-philosophical", "political-ideological" and moral problems associated with the period, which thus poses special challenges for the historian. In The Nazi Dictatorship, Kershaw surveyed the historical literature and offered his own assessment of the pros and cons of the various approaches.

In the 2015 edition of The Nazi Dictatorship, Kershaw, although he acknowledged plausible objections to the application of a common "totalitarianism" paradigm to both Nazi Germany and the Soviet Union, agreed with those who have generally made these criticisms "that it is in itself a wholly legitimate exercise, whatever essential differences existed in ideology and socio-economic structures, to compare the forms and techniques of rule in Germany under Hitler and the Soviet Union under Stalin".

In a 2008 interview, Kershaw lists as his major intellectual influences Martin Broszat, Hans Mommsen, Alan Milward, Timothy Mason, Hans-Ulrich Wehler, William Carr, and Jeremy Noakes. In the same interview, Kershaw expressed strong approval of Mason's "Primacy of Politics" concept, in which it was German Big Business that served the Nazi regime rather than the other way around, against the orthodox Marxist "Primacy of Economics" concept. Despite his praise and admiration for Mason, in the 2000 edition of The Nazi Dictatorship, Kershaw was highly sceptical of Mason's "Flight into War" theory of an economic crisis in 1939 forcing the Nazi regime into war.

In the Historikerstreit ('historians' dispute') of 1986–1989, Kershaw followed Broszat in criticising the work and views of Ernst Nolte, Andreas Hillgruber, Michael Stürmer, Joachim Fest and Klaus Hildebrand, all of whom Kershaw saw as attempting to whitewash the German past in various ways. In the 1989 edition of The Nazi Dictatorship, Kershaw devoted a chapter towards rebutting the views of Nolte, Hillgruber, Fest, Hildebrand, and Stürmer. In regard to the debate between those who regard Nazism as a type of totalitarianism (and thus having more in common with the Soviet Union) versus those who regard Nazism as a type of fascism (and thus having more in common with Fascist Italy), Kershaw, though feeling that the totalitarianism approach is not without value, has argued that in essence, Nazism should be viewed as a type of fascism, albeit fascism of a very radical type. Writing of the Sonderweg debate, Kershaw finds the moderate Sonderweg approach of Jürgen Kocka the most satisfactory historical explanation for why the Nazi era occurred. In the 2000 edition of The Nazi Dictatorship, Kershaw wrote a scathing criticism of Gerhard Ritter's claim that one "madman" (i.e. Hitler) "single-handedly" caused the Second World War in Europe, and added that he found the historical approach of Ritter's arch-enemy Fritz Fischer to be a far better way of understanding and reckoning with German history. Along the same lines, Kershaw criticised the 1946 statement by the German historian Friedrich Meinecke that Nazism was just a particularly unfortunate Betriebsunfall ('industrial accident') of history.

Kershaw was later in a 2003 essay to criticise Ritter and Meinecke, stating that by their promotion of the Betriebsunfall theory or by blaming everything upon Hitler, they were seeking to whitewash the German past. Writing of the work of the German historian Rainer Zitelmann, Kershaw has argued that Zitelmann has elevated what were merely secondary considerations in Hitler's remarks to the primary level, and that Zitelmann has not offered a clear definition of what he means by "modernization".

With regard to the Nazi foreign policy debate between "globalists" such as Klaus Hildebrand, Andreas Hillgruber, Jochen Thies, Gunter Moltman and Gerhard Weinberg, who argue that Germany aimed at world conquest, and the "continentalists" such as Hugh Trevor-Roper, Eberhard Jäckel and Axel Kuhn, who argue that Germany aimed only at the conquest of Europe, Kershaw tends towards the "continental" position. Kershaw agrees with the thesis that Hitler did formulate a programme for foreign policy based on an alliance with Britain to achieve the destruction of the Soviet Union, but has argued that a British lack of interest doomed the project, thus leading to the situation in 1939, where Hitler went to war with Britain, the country he wanted as an ally, not as an enemy, and the country he wanted as an enemy, the Soviet Union, as his ally. At the same time, Kershaw sees considerable merit in the work of such historians as Timothy Mason, Hans Mommsen, Martin Broszat and Wolfgang Schieder, who argue that Hitler had no "programme" in foreign policy, and instead contend that his foreign policy was simply a kneejerk reaction to domestic pressures in the economy and his need to maintain his popularity.

Regarding the historical debates about Widerstand ('resistance') in German society, Kershaw has argued that there are two approaches to the question, one of which he calls the fundamentalist (dealing with those committed to overthrowing the Nazi regime) and the other the societal (dealing with forms of dissent in "everyday life"). In Kershaw's view, Broszat's Resistenz ('immunity') concept works well in an Alltagsgeschichte approach, but works less well in the field of high politics, and by focusing only on the "effect" of one's actions, fails to consider the crucial element of the "intention" behind one's actions.

Kershaw has argued that the term Widerstand should be used only for those working for the total overthrow of the Nazi system, and those engaging in behaviour that was counter to the regime's wishes without seeking to overthrow the regime should be included under the terms opposition and dissent, depending upon their motives and actions. In Kershaw's opinion, there were three bands ranging from dissent to opposition to resistance. Kershaw has used the Edelweiss Pirates as an example of a group whose behaviour initially fell under dissent, and who advanced from there to opposition and finally to resistance.

In Kershaw's view, there was much dissent and opposition within German society, but outside of the working class, very little resistance. Although Kershaw has argued that the Resistenz (immunity [against indoctrination]) concept has much merit, he concluded that the Nazi regime had a broad basis of support and it is correct to speak of "resistance without the people".

The debate in the late 1980s between Martin Broszat and Saul Friedländer over Broszat's call for the "historicization" of Nazism, Kershaw wrote that he agreed with Friedländer that the Nazi period could not be treated as a "normal" period of history, but he felt that historians should approach the Nazi period as they would any other period of history. In support of Broszat, Kershaw wrote that an Alltagsgeschichte approach to German history, provided that it did not lose sight of Nazi crimes, had much to offer as a way of understanding how those crimes occurred.

During the "Goldhagen Controversy" of 1996, Kershaw took the view that his friend, Hans Mommsen, had "destroyed" Daniel Goldhagen's arguments about a culture of "eliminationist antisemitism" in Germany during their frequent debates on German TV. Kershaw wrote that he agreed with Eberhard Jäckel's assessment that Hitler's Willing Executioners was "simply a bad book". Though Kershaw had little positive to say about Goldhagen, he wrote that he felt that Norman Finkelstein's attack on Goldhagen had been over-the-top and did little to help historical understanding.

Kershaw later recommended Norman Finkelstein and Ruth Bettina Birn's extremely critical assessment of Goldhagen's book, A Nation on Trial: The Goldhagen Thesis and Historical Truth, stating that "Finkelstein and Birn provide a devastating critique of Daniel Goldhagen's simplistic and misleading interpretation of the Holocaust. Their contribution to the debate is, in my view, indispensable".

== Structuralist views ==
Like Broszat, Kershaw sees the structures of the Nazi state as far more important than the personality of Hitler (or anyone else) as an explanation for the way Nazi Germany developed. Kershaw subscribes to the view argued by Broszat and the German historian Hans Mommsen that Nazi Germany was a chaotic collection of rival bureaucracies in perpetual power struggles with each other. In Kershaw's view, the Nazi dictatorship was not a totalitarian monolith, but rather an unstable coalition of several blocs in a "power cartel" comprising the NSDAP, big business, the German state bureaucracy, the Army and SS/police agencies, and each of the "power blocs" was divided into factions. In Kershaw's opinion, the more "radical" blocs such as the SS/police and the Nazi Party gained increasing ascendancy over the other blocs after the 1936 economic crisis, and then increased their power at the expense of the other blocs.

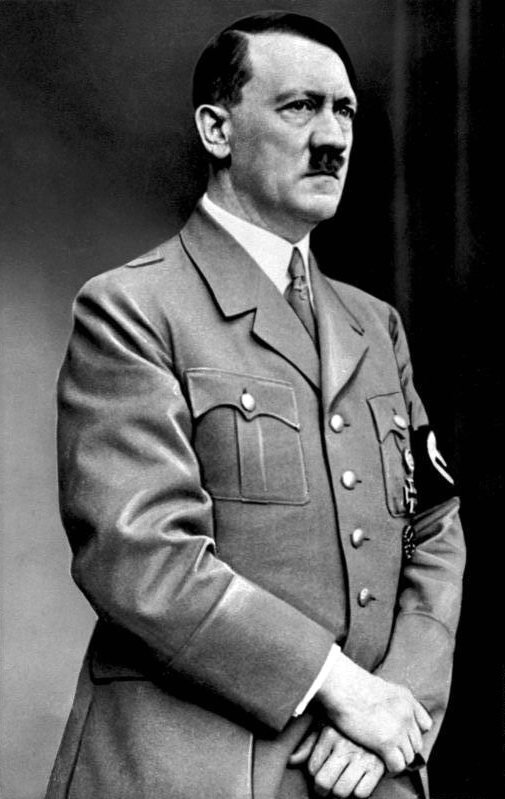
Adolf Hitler, the subject of several of Kershaw's books

For Kershaw, the real significance of Hitler lies not in him, but rather in the German people's perception of him. In his biography of Hitler, Kershaw presented him as the ultimate "unperson"; a boring, pedestrian man devoid of even the "negative greatness" attributed to him by Joachim Fest. Kershaw rejects the great man theory of history and has criticised those who seek to explain everything that happened in Nazi Germany as the result of Hitler's will and intentions. Kershaw has argued that it is absurd to seek to explain German history in the Nazi era solely through Hitler, as Germany had sixty-eight million people and to seek to explain the fate of sixty-eight million people solely through the prism of one man is in Kershaw's opinion a flawed position.

Kershaw wrote about the problems of an excessive focus on Hitler that "even the best biographies have seemed at times in danger of elevating Hitler's personal power to a level where the history of Germany between 1933 and 1945 becomes reduced to little more than an expression of the dictator's will". Kershaw has a low opinion of those who seek to provide "personalized" theories about the Holocaust and/or World War II as due to some defect, medical or otherwise, in Hitler. In his 2000 edition of The Nazi Dictatorship, Kershaw quoted with approval the dismissive remarks made by the German historian Hans-Ulrich Wehler in 1980 about such theories. Wehler wrote,

Does our understanding of National Socialist policies really depend on whether Hitler had only one testicle? ... Perhaps the Führer had three, which made things difficult for him, who knows? ... Even if Hitler could be regarded irrefutably as a sadomasochist, which scientific interest does that further? ... Does the "Final Solution of the Jewish Question" thus become more easily understandable or the "twisted road to Auschwitz" become the one-way street of a psychopath in power?

Kershaw shares Wehler's opinion, that, besides the problem that such theories about Hitler's medical condition were extremely difficult to prove, they had the effect of personalising the phenomena of Nazi Germany by more or less attributing everything that happened in Nazi Germany to one flawed individual.

Kershaw's biography of Hitler is an examination of Hitler's power; how he obtained it and how he maintained it. Following up on ideas that he had first introduced in a 1991 book about Hitler, Kershaw has argued that Hitler's leadership is a model example of Max Weber's theory of charismatic leadership. Kershaw's 1991 book Hitler: A Profile in Power marked a change for him from writing about how people viewed Hitler to writing about Hitler. In his two-volume biography of Hitler published in 1998 and 2000, Kershaw stated, "What I tried to do was to embed Hitler into the social and political context that I had already studied."

Kershaw finds the picture of Hitler as a "mountebank" (opportunistic adventurer) in Alan Bullock's biography unsatisfactory, and Joachim Fest's quest to determine how "great" Hitler was senseless. In a wider sense, Kershaw sees the Nazi regime as part of a broader crisis that afflicted European society from 1914 to 1945. Though in disagreement with many of their claims (especially Nolte's), Kershaw's concept of a "Second Thirty Years' War" reflects many similarities with Ernst Nolte, A. J. P. Taylor and Arno J. Mayer who have also advanced the concept of a "Thirty Years' Crisis" to explain European history between 1914 and 1945.

=== Functionalism–intentionalism debate ===
In the functionalism versus intentionalism debate, Kershaw has argued for a synthesis of the two schools, though leaning towards the functionalist school. Despite some disagreements, Kershaw has called Mommsen a "good personal friend" and an "important further vital stimulus to my own work on Nazism". Kershaw has argued in his two-volume biography of Hitler that Hitler did play a decisive role in the development of policies of genocide, but also argued that many of the measures that led to the Holocaust were undertaken by many lower-ranking officials without direct orders from Hitler in the expectation that such steps would win them favour. Though Kershaw does not deny the radical antisemitism of the Nazis, he favours Mommsen's view of the Holocaust being caused by the "cumulative radicalization" of Nazi Germany caused by the endless bureaucratic power struggles and a turn towards increasingly radical antisemitism within the Nazi elite.

Despite his background in the functionalist historiography, Kershaw admits that his account of Hitler in World War II owes much to intentionalist historians like Gerhard Weinberg, Hugh Trevor-Roper, Lucy Dawidowicz and Eberhard Jäckel. Kershaw accepts the picture of Hitler drawn by intentionalist historians as a fanatical ideologue who was obsessed with social Darwinism, völkisch antisemitism (in which the Jewish people were viewed as a "race" biologically different from the rest of humanity rather than a religion), militarism and the perceived need for Lebensraum.

In a 1992 essay, "Improvised genocide?", in which Kershaw traces how the ethnic cleansing campaign of Gauleiter Arthur Greiser in the Warthegau region annexed to Germany from Poland in 1939 led to a campaign of genocide by 1941, Kershaw argued that the process was indeed "improvised genocide" rather than the fulfilment of a master plan. Kershaw views the Holocaust not as a plan, as argued by the intentionalists, but rather a process caused by the "cumulative radicalization" of the Nazi state as articulated by the functionalists. Citing the work of the American historian Christopher Browning in his biography of Hitler, Kershaw argues that in the period 1939–1941 the phrase "Final Solution to the Jewish Question" was a "territorial solution", that such plans as the Nisko Plan and Madagascar Plan were serious and only in the latter half of 1941 did the phrase "Final Solution" come to refer to genocide. This view of the Holocaust as a process rather than a plan is the antithesis of the extreme intentionalist approach as advocated by Lucy Dawidowicz, who argues that Hitler had decided upon genocide as early as November 1918, and that everything he did was directed towards that goal.

== "Working Towards the Führer" concept ==
Kershaw disagrees with Mommsen's "Weak Dictator" thesis: the idea that Hitler was a relatively unimportant player in Nazi Germany. He has agreed with his idea that Hitler did not play much of a role in the day-to-day administration of the government of Nazi Germany. Kershaw's way of explaining this paradox is his theory of "Working Towards the Führer", the phrase being taken from a 1934 speech by the Prussian civil servant Werner Willikens:

Everyone who has the opportunity to observe it knows that the Fuhrer can hardly dictate from above everything which he intends to realize sooner or later. On the contrary, up till now, everyone with a post in the new Germany has worked best when he has, so to speak, worked towards the Fuhrer. Very often and in many spheres, it has been the case—in previous years as well—that individuals have simply waited for orders and instructions. Unfortunately, the same will be true in the future; but in fact, it is the duty of everybody to try to work towards the Fuhrer along the lines he would wish. Anyone who makes mistakes will notice it soon enough. But anyone who really works towards the Fuhrer along his lines and towards his goal will certainly both now and in the future, one day have the finest reward in the form of the sudden legal confirmation of his work.

— Werner Willikens (1934)

Kershaw has argued that in Nazi Germany officials of the German state and Party bureaucracy usually took the initiative in initiating policy to meet Hitler's perceived wishes, or alternatively attempted to turn into policy Hitler's often loosely and indistinctly phrased wishes. Though Kershaw does agree that Hitler possessed the powers that the "Master of the Third Reich" thesis championed by Norman Rich and Karl Dietrich Bracher would suggest, he has argued that Hitler was a "lazy dictator", an indifferent dictator who was really not interested in involving himself much in the daily running of Nazi Germany. The only exceptions were the areas of foreign policy and military decisions, both areas that Hitler increasingly involved himself in from the late 1930s.

In a 1993 essay "Working Towards the Führer", Kershaw argued that the German and Soviet dictatorships had more differences than similarities. Kershaw argued that Hitler was a very unbureaucratic leader who was highly averse to paperwork, in marked contrast to Joseph Stalin. Kershaw argued that Stalin was highly involved in the running of the Soviet Union, in contrast to Hitler whose involvement in day-to-day decision making was limited, infrequent and capricious. Kershaw argued that the Soviet regime, despite its extreme brutality and ruthlessness, was basically rational in its goal of seeking to modernise a backward country and had no equivalent of the "cumulative radicalization" towards increasingly irrational goals that Kershaw sees as characteristic of Nazi Germany. In Kershaw's opinion, Stalin's power corresponded to Max Weber's category of bureaucratic authority, whereas Hitler's power corresponded to Weber's category of charismatic authority.

In Kershaw's view, what happened in Germany after 1933 was the imposition of Hitler's charismatic authority on top of the "legal-rational" authority system that had existed prior to 1933, leading to a gradual breakdown of any system of ordered authority in Germany. Kershaw argues that by 1938 the German state had been reduced to a hopeless, polycratic shambles of rival agencies all competing with each other for Hitler's favour, which by that time had become the only source of political legitimacy. Kershaw sees this rivalry as causing the "cumulative radicalization" of Germany, and argues that though Hitler always favoured the most radical solution to any problem, it was German officials who, for the most part, in attempting to win the Führer's approval, carried out on their initiative, increasingly "radical" solutions to perceived problems like the "Jewish Question", as opposed to being ordered to do so by Hitler. In this, Kershaw largely agrees with Mommsen's portrait of Hitler as a distant and remote leader standing in many ways above his system, whose charisma and ideas served to set the general tone of politics.

As an example of how Hitler's power functioned, Kershaw used Hitler's directive to the Gauleiters Albert Forster and Arthur Greiser to "Germanize" the part of north-western Poland annexed to Germany in 1939 within the next 10 years with his promise that "no questions would be asked" about how this would be done. As Kershaw notes, the different ways Forster and Greiser sought to "Germanize" their Gaue – with Forster simply having the local Polish population in his Gau signing forms saying they had "German blood", and Greiser carrying out a program of brutal ethnic cleansing of Poles in his Gau – showed both how Hitler set events in motion, and how his Gauleiters could use different methods in pursuit of what they believed to be Hitler's wishes. In Kershaw's opinion, Hitler's vision of a racially cleansed Volksgemeinschaft provided the impetus for German officials to carry out increasingly extreme measures to win his approval, which ended with the Holocaust.

The Israeli historian Otto Dov Kulka has praised the concept of "working towards the Führer" as the best way of understanding how the Holocaust occurred, combining the best features and avoiding the weaknesses of both the "functionalist" and "intentionalist" theories.

For Kershaw, Hitler held absolute power in Nazi Germany due to the "erosion of collective government in Germany", but his power over domestic politics became more challenging to exercise due to his preoccupation with military affairs, and the rival fiefdoms of the Nazi state fought each other and attempted to carry out Hitler's vaguely worded wishes and dimly defined orders by "Working Towards the Führer".

== Later career ==
Kershaw retired from full-time teaching in 2008. In the 2010s, he wrote two books on the wider history of Europe for The Penguin History of Europe series: To Hell and Back: Europe, 1914–1949 and Rollercoaster: Europe, 1950–2017.

== Honours and memberships ==
- Fellow of the British Academy
- 1994: Order of Merit of the Federal Republic of Germany
- 2000: Winner of the Wolfson History Prize, for Hitler, 1936–1945: Nemesis (Allen Lane)
- 2001: Co-winner of the British Academy Book Prize
- Fellow of the Royal Historical Society
- Member of the Historical Association
- Fellow of the Wissenschaftskolleg zu Berlin
- 2002: Appointed Knight Bachelor in the 2002 Birthday Honours for services to history
- 2004: A collection of scholarly essays in honour of Ian Kershaw was published.
- 2005: Elizabeth Longford Prize for Historical Biography for Making Friends with Hitler: Lord Londonderry, the Nazis and the Road to War
- 2012: Leipzig Book Award for European Understanding (together with Timothy D. Snyder)
- 2018: Charlemagne Medal

== Works ==
- Bolton Priory Rentals and Ministers; Accounts, 1473–1539 (ed.) (Leeds, 1969)
- Bolton Priory. The Economy of a Northern Monastery (Oxford, 1973)
- 'The Great Famine and agrarian crisis in England 1315-22' in Past & Present, 59 (1973)
- "The Persecution of the Jews and German Popular Opinion in the Third Reich" pp. 261–289 from Yearbook of the Leo Baeck Institute, Volume 26, 1981
- Popular Opinion and Political Dissent in the Third Reich. Bavaria, 1933–45 (Oxford, 1983, rev. 2002), ISBN 0-19-821922-9
- The Nazi Dictatorship. Problems and Perspectives of Interpretation (London, 1985, 4th ed., 2000), ISBN 0-340-76028-1 online free to borrow
- The "Hitler Myth": Image and Reality in the Third Reich (Oxford, 1987, rev. 2001), ISBN 0-19-280206-2 online
- Weimar. Why did German Democracy Fail? (ed.) (London, 1990), ISBN 0-312-04470-4
- Hitler: A Profile in Power (London, 1991, rev. 2001)
- "'Improvised genocide?' The Emergence of the 'Final Solution' in the 'Wargenthau" pp. 51–78 from Transactions of the Royal Historical Society, Volume 2, December 1992
- "Working Towards the Führer: Reflections on the Nature of the Hitler Dictatorship", pp. 103–118 from Contemporary European History, Volume 2, Issue No. 2, 1993; reprinted on pp. 231–252 from The Third Reich edited by Christian Leitz, London: Blackwell, 1999, ISBN 0-631-20700-7
- Stalinism and Nazism: Dictatorships in Comparison (ed. with Moshe Lewin) (Cambridge, 1997), ISBN 0-521-56521-9
- Hitler 1889–1936: Hubris (London, 1998), ISBN 0-393-32035-9
- Hitler 1936–1945: Nemesis (London, 2000), ISBN 0-393-32252-1
- The Bolton Priory Compotus 1286–1325 (ed. with David M. Smith) (London, 2001)
- Making Friends with Hitler: Lord Londonderry and the British Road to War (London, 2004), ISBN 0-7139-9717-6
- "Europe's Second Thirty Years War" pp. 10–17 from History Today, Volume 55, Issue # 9, September 2005
- Death in the Bunker (Penguin Books, 2005), ISBN 978-0141022314
- Fateful Choices: Ten Decisions That Changed the World, 1940–1941 (London, 2007), ISBN 1-59420-123-4
- Hitler, the Germans and the Final Solution (Yale, 2008), ISBN 0-300-12427-9
- Hitler (one-volume abridgment of Hitler 1889–1936 and Hitler 1936–1945; London, 2008), ISBN 1-84614-069-2
- Luck of the Devil The Story of Operation Valkyrie (London: Penguin Books, 2009. Published for the first time as a separate book, Luck of the Devil is taken from Ian Kershaw's bestselling Hitler 1936-1945: Nemesis), ISBN 0-14-104006-8
- The End: Hitler's Germany 1944–45 (Allen Lane, 2011), ISBN 0-7139-9716-8
- To Hell and Back: Europe, 1914–1949 (Allen Lane, 2015), ISBN 978-0713990898
- Roller-Coaster: Europe, 1950–2017 (Allen Lane, 2018), ISBN 978-0241187166; The American edition is titled The Global Age: Europe, 1950–2017, eBook ISBN 9780735223998
- Personality and Power: Builders and Destroyers of Modern Europe (Penguin Press, 2022)

== Sources ==
- Arana, Marie (19 October 2008). "Ian Kershaw: Casting light on the shadows". The Washington Post Book World. p. 11.
- "Hitler 1889-1936. Hubris. Ian Kershaw". Baillie Gifford Prize for Non-Fiction. 2026.
- "Sir Ian Kershaw: Dissecting Hitler". BBC News. British Broadcasting Corporation. 14 June 2002.
- "Result of the British Academy Book Prize 2001". British Academy. 2006. Archived from the original on 20 June 2007.
- "Leipzig Book Award for European Understanding. The Previous Winners of the Prize". City of Leipzig. 2019. Archived from the original on 28 December 2019.
- Crace, John (12 December 2000). "Ian Kershaw: My Inspiration". The Guardian. Archived from the original on 19 May 2017.
- Evans, Richard J. (1989). In Hitler's Shadow: West German Historians and the Attempt to Escape from the Nazi Past. New York City: Pantheon Books. ISBN 978-0-394-57686-2. LCCN 88043239. OCLC 18740694. OL 2061583M. Wikidata Q140468023.
- Kershaw, Ian (1992). "Improvised Genocide? The emergence of the 'Final Solution' in the 'Warthegau'". Transactions of the Royal Historical Society. 2, December: 51–78. doi:10.2307/3679099. S2CID 159942399.
- Kershaw, Ian (1993). "'Working Towards the Führer.' Reflections on the Nature of the Hitler Dictatorship". Contemporary European History. 2 (2). Cambridge University Press: 103–118. JSTOR 20081474.
- Kershaw, Ian (1998). Hitler 1889–1936: Hubris. New York: W. W. Norton & Company. ISBN 978-0-393-04671-7.
- Kershaw, Ian (2000a). The Nazi Dictatorship: Problems and Perspectives of Interpretation. London: Arnold Press. ISBN 978-0-340-76028-4.
- Kershaw, Ian (2000b). The Nazi Dictatorship: Problems and Perspectives of Interpretation. Oxford: Oxford University Press. ISBN 978-0-340-76028-4.
- Kershaw, Ian (2001). Hitler 1936-1945: Nemesis. New York: W. W. Norton & Company. ISBN 978-0-393-32252-1.
- Kershaw, Ian (24 October 2002). "Interview with Ian Kershaw" (Interview). Interviewed by Roman, Thomas. Eurozine. Archived from the original on 22 February 2012.
- Kershaw, Ian (24 February 2004). "Beware the Moral High Ground". H-Soz-u-Kult. Archived from the original on 29 May 2004.
- Kershaw, Ian (2005). "Europe's Second Thirty Years War". History Today. Vol. 55, no. 9, September. pp. 10–17.
- Kershaw, Ian (14 May 2008). "Professor Sir Ian Kershaw" (Interview). Interviewed by Millum, Danny. History Department, Sheffield University: Institute of Historical Research. Archived from the original on 2 June 2017.
- Kershaw, Ian (2015). The Nazi Dictatorship: Problems and Perspectives of Interpretation (5th ed.). London and New York: Bloomsbury Academic (Bloomsbury Publishing Plc). ISBN 978-1-474-24096-3.
- Kulka, Otto Dov (February 2000). "The Role of Hitler in the 'Final Solution'". Yad Vashem. Archived from the original on 5 June 2011.
- Leitz, Christian, ed. (1999). The Third Reich. London: Blackwill. ISBN 9780631207009. LCCN 99024872. OCLC 40964965. OL 18142031M.
  - Kershaw, Ian (1999). "'Working Towards the Führer'. Reflections on the Nature of the Hitler Dictatorship". In Leitz (1999), pp. 231–252.
- Livingstone, Helen (29 April 2013). "Ian Kershaw bleibt bei Europas Zukunft skeptisch" [Ian Kershaw Remains Skeptical About Europe's Future]. Stern (in German). Archived from the original on 9 March 2017.
- "Birthday Honours List". The London Gazette (Supplement). No. 56595. 15 June 2002. p. 1. "Professor Ian Kershaw, Professor of Modern History, University of Sheffield. For services to History."
- Lukacs, John (1998). The Hitler of History. New York: Vintage Books. ISBN 0-375-70113-3. LCCN 98026451. OCLC 39195495. OL 366085M.
- Marrus, Michael (2000). The Holocaust in History. Toronto: KeyPorter. ISBN 0874514258. LCCN 99931498. OCLC 41628475. OL 8568934M.
- McElligott, Anthony; Kirk, Tim, eds. (2004). Working Towards the Führer. Essays in Honour of Sir Ian Kershaw. Manchester: Manchester University Press. ISBN 0-7190-6732-4. OL 7859936M.
- "Sir Ian Kershaw (2018)". Verein Médaille Charlemagne pour les Médias Européens e.V.. n.d.
- Michman, Dan (11 November 2021). "Why Is the Shoah Called 'the Shoah' or 'the Holocaust'? On the History of the Terminology for the Nazi Anti-Jewish Campaign". The Journal of Holocaust Research. 35 (4): 233–256. doi:10.1080/25785648.2021.1994764.
- Mosley, Charles, ed. (2003). Burke's Peerage Baronetage & Knightage (107 ed.). Burke's Peerage. ISBN 0-9711966-2-1. OL 8563686M.
- Moss, Stephen (17 August 2011). "A life in writing: Ian Kershaw". The Guardian.
- Rees, Laurence (1997). The Nazis: A Warning From History. New York: New Press. ISBN 1565844459. LCCN 2003389304. OCLC 1150837600. OL 3731952M.
- Snowman, Daniel (July 2001). "Ian Kershaw". History Today. Vol. 51, no. 7. pp. 18–20.
- Trosky, Susan M., ed. (1992). Contemporary Authors. Vol. 37. Gale Research International. ISBN 978-0-810-31962-2. ISSN 0275-7176. OCLC 1028576800. OL 11317595M.
- "Professor Sir Ian Kershaw, B.A. (Liv.), D.Phil. (Oxon.), F.B.A." University of Sheffield. 27 July 2007. Archived from the original on 24 December 2007.

Awards
Preceded by Joanna Bourke	Wolfson History Prize; 2001; With: Mark Mazower and Roy Porter	Succeeded by Barry Cunliffe
Preceded by Andrew Roberts	Wolfson History Prize; 2001; With: Mark Mazower and Roy Porter	Succeeded by Jerry White
Preceded by Sir Keith Thomas	Medlicott Medal; 2004	Succeeded by Sir Martin Gilbert
Preceded by Martin Pollack	Leipzig Book Award for European Understanding; 2012	Succeeded by Timothy D. Snyder
