= Werner Willikens =

Werner Willikens (8 February 1893, Vienenburg – 25 October 1961, Wolfenbüttel) was a German politician with the Nazi Party who largely served in agricultural administration. He was also a general officer in the SS. His phrase "working towards the Führer", which he used in a 1934 speech, has become a common description of Nazi bureaucracy.

== Biography ==
Willikens enrolled in the German Imperial Army in 1912 and served in World War I as an artillery battery commander.

An early Nazi Party member, he joined in 1925 (membership number 3,355) and served as the Ortsgruppenleiter (Local Group Leader) in Goslar. He was a farmer by profession and organised the first training course for Nazi farmers in 1926. Willikens was a member of the Reichstag from electoral constituency 16 (South Hanover–Braunschweig), elected as one of the first 12 Nazi deputies in 1928 and retained this seat until the fall of the Third Reich.

In 1930, Willikens was appointed deputy chairman of Agrarpolitischer Apparat, the Agricultural Affairs Bureau of the NSDAP headed by Richard Walther Darré, and he also chaired the Agrarian League. His appointment to the national executive of the Reichslandbund in 1930 was the first time that the highly conservative group – up to that point firmly linked to the German National People's Party – had given a position of influence to a Nazi. After Adolf Hitler came to power, Willikens was appointed as State Secretary in the Prussian Ministry of Agriculture, Domains and Forests in July 1933, also under Darré. On 31 July 1933, Hermann Göring, the Prussian minister president, appointed him to the recently reconstituted Prussian State Council. When the Prussian ministry was merged with Darré's Reich Ministry of Food and Agriculture in January 1935, Willikens continued to serve as a State Secretary in the united Reich Ministry. He became a member of the SS in May 1933 (member number 56,180) and eventually reached the rank of SS-Gruppenführer on 30 January 1938.

Ian Kershaw has argued that a speech made by Willikens in 1934, in particular his use of the phrase "working towards the Führer" ("zu versuchen im Sinne des Führers ihm entgegenzuarbeiten"), was important in laying the framework for the Holocaust. Kershaw argued that the speech recognised the aloofness of Hitler's charismatic leadership and thus encouraged officials to second-guess Hitler's wishes and act accordingly. Kershaw suggests that Adolf Eichmann's rise from minor functionary to a leading role in the SS was built on this principle of "working towards the Führer". Indeed, such was Kershaw's use of Willikens' phrase that his tribute book even bore it as a title. The speech itself was made in Berlin on 21 February 1934 to representatives of the regional agriculture ministries.

After the fall of the Nazi regime, Willikens underwent denazification proceedings, was imprisoned, released and returned to his farm until his death in 1961.
