= Hitler (Kershaw books) =

Books by Ian Kershaw

Hitler 1889–1936: Hubris
- Author: Ian Kershaw
- Subject: Adolf Hitler; Nazi Germany
- Published: 1998
- Publisher: Allen Lane
- Publication place: England
- Pages: 845
- ISBN: 978-0-713-99047-8

Hitler 1936–1945: Nemesis
- Author: Ian Kershaw
- Subject: Adolf Hitler; Nazi Germany
- Published: 2000
- Publisher: Allen Lane
- Pages: 1115
- ISBN: 978-0-713-99229-8

Hitler: A Biography
- Author: Ian Kershaw
- Subject: Adolf Hitler; Nazi Germany
- Published: 2008
- Publisher: W. W. Norton & Company
- Pages: 1030
- ISBN: 978-0-393-06757-6

Hitler is a two-volume biography of Adolf Hitler, written by the historian Ian Kershaw. Its volumes are Hitler 1889-1936: Hubris, published in 1998, and Hitler 1936-1945: Nemesis, published in 2000. An abridged single-volume edition was published in 2008.

Kershaw's biography is informed by his "Working towards the Führer" theory. He argues that radicalisation and atrocities in Nazi Germany were often driven by subordinates competing for advancement and aiming to follow Hitler's broadly outlined wishes. In the introduction, Kershaw describes Hitler as an uninteresting character ("an unperson" whose life outside of politics was "a void") and argues that Hitler is instead remarkable because of the power and reverence that he was able to obtain. He warns against using an approach that "personalizes history", instead arguing that social, cultural and economic conditions were more important, while still agreeing that Hitler had a role and culpability in the events.

== Reception ==
The second volume was one of the three winners of the Wolfson History Prize in 2001.

The historian David Welch described the first volume as "biographical history at its best by a master historian who has full command of the sources".

Michael Lynch, a historian at the University of Leicester, wrote in 2012 that "If any biography merits the epithet 'definitive', it is Sir Ian Kershaw's towering two volume study."
