= Hitler über Deutschland =

1932 German presidential campaign

The Deutschlandflüge (English: Germany flights) were four campaign tours in 1932 for Hitler's run in the 1932 German presidential election and for the Nazi Party in the July 1932 German federal election and November 1932 German federal election. Hitler traveled across Germany by plane and by car, appearing at around 200 major events altogether. Photographer Heinrich Hoffman and a film team were part of his entourage. During the tours, Hitler would visit as many as five cities in one day by plane, addressing rallies of tens of thousands of people. There were four tours: one for the first round of the presidential election, one for the second round from the 16th to 24th of April, the third later in 1932, and the fourth between 11 October and 5 November. For the first tours, a Rohrbach Ro VIII Roland named Niederwald was used, while a Ju 52 named Immelmann was used for the November election tour.

Hitler über Deutschland (English: Hitler over Germany) was the name of a silent film and of a photobook made about the 1932 presidential election tour as campaign propaganda. The photobook contained photographs taken by Heinrich Hoffmann. It was an inexpensive booklet, and 500,000 copies of it were printed. The photobook was published by Eher-Verlag.
