= Anthony McElligott =

Anthony McElligott B.A., Ph.D., FRHistS (born 1955) is a social, cultural and political historian of 19th and 20th century Europe with a focus on Germany. He is an emeritus professor of history at the University of Limerick.

== Works ==
- McElligott, Anthony (2001). The German Urban Experience, 1900–1945: Modernity and Crisis. Psychology Press. ISBN 978-0-415-12115-6.
- McElligott, Anthony (2013). Rethinking the Weimar Republic: Authority and Authoritarianism, 1916–1936. A&C Black. ISBN 978-1-84966-441-7.
- McElligott, Anthony (2023). The Last Transport: The Holocaust in the Eastern Aegean. Bloomsbury Academic. ISBN 978-1-4742-2798-8.
