= T. C. W. Blanning =

English historian (born 1942)

Timothy Charles William Blanning FBA (born 21 April 1942) is an English historian who served as Professor of Modern European History at the University of Cambridge from 1992 to 2009.

== Career ==
Timothy Charles William Blanning attended the King's School in Bruton. He went up to Sidney Sussex College, Cambridge, graduating with a Bachelor of Arts degree and completing his doctorate there in 1967. In 1965, he was elected to a research fellowship at Sidney Sussex, and in 1968 was elected to a fellowship there. He was appointed to an assistant lectureship at the University of Cambridge in 1972, being promoted to lecturer four years later. He was promoted again to be Reader in Modern European History in 1987, and was appointed Professor of Modern European History in 1992. He retired in 2009, but remains at Cambridge as an emeritus professor.

=== Research ===
Blanning's first book, Reform and Revolution in Mainz, 1743–1803 (1974), offered a case study that examined the "German Problem", the idea that modern Germany began moving apart from Western Europe in political and cultural terms; Blanning sought to demonstrate that this process began in the eighteenth century, whereas earlier historians had emphasised the nineteenth century as a more important period. His second book, The French Revolution in Germany: Occupation and Resistance in the Rhineland, 1792–1802, was published in 1983. The French Revolution was also the subject of Blanning's The Origins of the French Revolutionary Wars (1986), The French Revolution: Aristocrats versus Bourgeois? (1987) and The French Revolutionary Wars (1996). Blanning argues that Napoleon's actions in Germany did speed up the emergence of a German national consciousness; on the other hand it did nothing to modernize Germany's governance, economy, or culture.

He turned to biography, covering the Holy Roman Emperor Joseph II in 1994. He has published biographies of George I (2017) and Frederick the Great of Prussia (2015), the latter of which won the British Academy Medal in 2016.

Since the early 2000s, Blanning's work has also focused on cultural histories of Europe, beginning in 2002 with his book The Culture of Power and the Power of Culture; this was followed by The Pursuit of Glory: Europe 1648–1815 (2006), The Triumph of Music: Composers, Musicians and Audiences, 1700 to the Present (2008) and The Romantic Revolution (2011).

== Honours ==
In 1990, Blanning was elected a Fellow of the British Academy (FBA). In September 2016, he was awarded the British Academy Medal for his book Frederick the Great: King of Prussia (2015). Blanning was awarded a Doctor of Letters degree by the University of Cambridge in 1998.

== Works ==
=== Books authored ===
- Joseph II and Enlightened Despotism (Longman, 1970)
- Reform and Revolution in Mainz, 1743–1803 (Cambridge University Press, 1974)
- The French Revolution in Germany: Occupation and Resistance in the Rhineland, 1792–1802 (Oxford University Press, 1983)
- The Origins of the French Revolutionary Wars (Longman, 1986)
- The French Revolution: Aristocrats versus Bourgeois? (Macmillan, 1987); a second edition was published in 1998 as The French Revolution: Class War or Culture Clash?
- Joseph II (Longman, 1994)
- The French Revolutionary Wars 1787–1802 (Edward Arnold, 1996)
- The French Revolution: Class War or Culture Clash? (Macmillan, 1997)
- The Culture of Power and the Power of Culture: Old Regime Europe, 1660–1789 (Oxford University Press, 2002)
- The Pursuit of Glory: Europe 1648–1815 (Penguin, 2007)
- The Triumph of Music: The Rise of Composers, Musicians and Their Art (Harvard University Press, 2008)
- The Romantic Revolution: A History (Modern Library, 2011)
- Frederick the Great: King of Prussia (Allen Lane, 2015)
- George I: The Lucky King (Allen Lane, 2017)
- Augustus the Strong: A Study in Artistic Greatness and Political Fiasco (Allen Lane, 2024)

=== Books edited ===
- The Oxford Illustrated History of Modern Europe (Oxford University Press, 1996)
- The Rise and Fall of the French Revolution (University of Chicago Press, 1996)
- with David Cannadine (eds.), History and Biography: Essays in Honour of Derek Beales (Cambridge, 1996)
- with Peter Wende (eds.), Reform in Great Britain and Germany, 1750–1850 (Oxford, 1999)
- The Short Oxford History of Europe, vol. 8: The Eighteenth Century and vol. 9: The Nineteenth Century (Oxford University Press, 2000)
- The Oxford History of Modern Europe (Oxford University Press, 2000)
- with Hagen Schulze (eds.), Unity and Diversity in European Culture c. 1800 (Oxford, 2006)
