= J. M. Wallace-Hadrill =

British historian (1916–1985)

Professor J. M. Wallace-Hadrill CBE FBA FRHistS
- Born: John Michael Wallace-Hadrill; 29 September 1916; Bromsgrove, Worcestershire, England
- Died: 3 November 1985 (aged 69)
- Occupations: Historian and academic
- Title: Chichele Professor of Modern History
- Spouse(s): Ethel Irving (m. 1943–1949) Anne Wakefield (m. 1950)
- Children: 2, including Andrew

Academic background
- Education: Cheltenham College
- Alma mater: Corpus Christi College, Oxford
- Doctoral advisor: Maurice Powicke

Academic work
- Era: Middle Ages
- Discipline: History
- Sub-discipline: Medieval History
- Institutions: Corpus Christi College, Oxford; University of Manchester; Merton College, Oxford; All Souls College, Oxford
- Doctoral students: Donald A. Bullough; Peter Sawyer; Julia M. H. Smith; Michael Wood; Patrick Wormald
- Main interests: Merovingian period

John Michael Wallace-Hadrill (29 September 1916 – 3 November 1985) was a British academic and one of the foremost historians of the early Merovingian period. He held the Chichele Chair in Modern History at the University of Oxford between 1974 and 1983.

== Life and career ==
Wallace-Hadrill was born on 29 September 1916 in Bromsgrove, Worcestershire, where his father was a master at Bromsgrove School. He was Professor of Mediaeval History at the University of Manchester between 1955 and 1961. He then became a Senior Research Fellow of Merton College in the University of Oxford (where he held the office of Sub-Warden) from 1961 till 1974. He was Chichele Professor of Modern History at Oxford from 1974 to 1983 and, between 1974 and 1985, a Fellow at All Souls College, Oxford.

Wallace-Hadrill was elected a Fellow of the British Academy in 1969 and delivered the Ford Lectures in 1971. He was a Vice-President of the Royal Historical Society between 1973 and 1976. He was appointed a Commander of the Order of the British Empire (CBE) in 1982. He is the father of the Roman historian Andrew Wallace-Hadrill and the brother of church historian, D.S. Wallace-Hadrill.

== Bibliography ==
- The Barbarian West, 400–1000 (1952).
- The Fourth Book of the Chronicle of Fredegar with Its Continuations (1960).
- The Long-haired Kings (London, 1962).
- Early Germanic Kingship in England and the Continent (Oxford, 1971).
- Early Medieval history (1976).
- The Frankish Church (1983).
- Ideal and reality in Frankish and Anglo-Saxon society: studies presented to J.M. Wallace-Hadrill (1983).
- Bede's Ecclesiastical History of the English People: A Historical Commentary (Oxford, 1988).

Professional and academic associations
Preceded by Christopher Robert Cheney	President of the Lancashire Parish Register Society; 1955–62	Succeeded by John Smith Roskell
