= Alice Rio =

French medieval historian and academic

Alice Rio FRHistS
- Born: Paris, France
- Occupations: Historian and academic
- Title: Chichele Professor of Medieval History
- Awards: Gladstone Book Prize (2009); Philip Leverhulme Prize (2010)

Academic background
- Education: King's College London (BA, MA, PhD)
- Thesis: Frankish legal formularies, c. 500–1000 (2006)
- Doctoral advisor: Janet Nelson

Academic work
- Discipline: History
- Sub-discipline: Early Middle Ages; Legal history; Slavery in medieval Europe; Carolingian Empire
- Institutions: New College, Oxford; Sidney Sussex College, Cambridge; King's College London; All Souls College, Oxford

Alice Rio FRHistS is a French historian of early medieval Europe with particular interests in legal culture and slavery in Francia. A former professor at King's College London, Rio has held the Chichele Chair in Medieval History at the University of Oxford since October 2025. She is currently co-editor, with Matthew Kelly, of the journal Past & Present.

== Early life and education ==
Rio was born and raised in Paris. She earned her B.A., M.A. and Ph.D. in history from King's College London, being supervised for the latter by Janet Nelson. Her doctoral thesis was entitled Frankish legal formularies, c. 500–1000 and completed in 2006.

== Academic career ==
After earning her doctorate Rio held a junior research fellowship at New College, Oxford and a fellowship at Sidney Sussex College, Cambridge. In 2009 she returned to King's College London as a lecturer in medieval European history. She was appointed Professor of Medieval History in 2018.

In 2011, Rio joined the editorial board of Past & Present, and in October 2022, succeeded Alexandra Walsham as the journal's co-editor, first alongside Matthew Hilton and then Matthew Kelly. She previously served as the journal's publications editor. Rio is an elected fellow of the Royal Historical Society.

In October 2025, Rio took up the Chichele Chair in Medieval History at the University of Oxford and a fellowship of All Souls College in succession to Julia M. H. Smith.

=== Research ===
Rio's first research interest was in early medieval legal culture, reflected in her first monograph which examined the "lively, eclectic textual community" visible in the handbooks of Frankish notaries. John J. Contreni, reviewing the book for Speculum, praised Rio for re-examining legal formulae, a popular focus of study for nineteenth-century historians, with fresh questions. For him, her examination of slavery and unfreedom in the formularies reminded historians to "look at these documents afresh". Contreni concluded by noting that Rio's success was in emphasising that "many people, from servi to emperors, fell within the purview of ordinary, ad hoc written culture", demonstrating the utility of these documents for further study.

Rio built upon this focus on slavery in her second monograph, Slavery after Rome, published by Oxford University Press in 2017. Her goal was to "move away from the “transition from slavery to serfdom” narrative which dominated the literature" and identify the complexities of slavery and unfreedom as markers defining particular experiences. Hannah Skoda, reviewing the book for the English Historical Review, praised Rio's "extremely important" intervention in a period in the history of slavery which "has often been marginalised, or seen as transitional" in comparison with Roman slavery and late medieval serfdom. Skoda noted Rio's focus on the "sense of flexibility in degrees of unfreedom" and how individuals could manipulate this flexibility. For Skoda, Rio demonstrated persuasively that normative frameworks of slavery were "overlapping, interlocking, and sometimes challenging one another" rather than being universal.

Rio's current research project is a trade book exploring early medieval European history through the lens of women travellers as "bearers of a minority culture". The book will be published by Bloomsbury as Rio's first work of history aimed at a general readership.

=== Media work ===
In 2019, Rio and Alice Taylor, a fellow medieval historian at King's College London, began hosting the podcast Medieval History for Fun and Profit, described as covering "everything you’ve always wanted to know about the middle ages but were afraid to ask".

== Honours and awards ==
In 2008, Rio won the Royal Historical Society's Early Career Article Prize for her article 'Freedom and Unfreedom in Early Medieval Francia: the Evidence of the Legal Formulae' (2007). In 2009, she won the society's Gladstone Book Prize for her monograph Legal Practice and the Written Word in the Early Middle Ages: Frankish Formulae, c. 500–1000. In 2010, Rio was awarded a Philip Leverhulme Prize for the international impact of her research. In January 2012, she was awarded a £666,000 Arts and Humanities Research Council grant as principal investigator of the three-year project 'The Making of Charlemagne's Europe (768–814)'.

== Bibliography ==
- The Formularies of Angers and Marculf: Two Merovingian Legal Handbooks (editor; Liverpool: Liverpool University Press, 2008) ISBN 9781846311598
- Legal Practice and the Written Word in the Early Middle Ages: Frankish Formulae, c. 500–1000 (Cambridge: Cambridge University Press, 2009) ISBN 9780521514996
- Slavery after Rome, 500–1100 (Oxford: Oxford University Press, 2017) ISBN 9780198704058
