= The British Yearbook of International Law =

- Discipline: Law
- Language: English
- Edited by: Eyal Benvenisti & Catherine Redgwell

Publication details
- Publisher: Oxford University Press (United Kingdom)
- Frequency: Annual

Standard abbreviations
- ISO 4: Br. Yearb. Int. Law

Indexing
- ISSN: 0068-2691 (print); 2044-9437 (web)

Links
- Journal homepage

The British Yearbook of International Law is an annual peer reviewed academic journal of law. It is published by Oxford University Press.

The editors are professor Eyal Benvenisti and professor Catherine Redgwell.
