= Imad Abd al-Salam Rauf =

Iraqi historian (1948–2021)

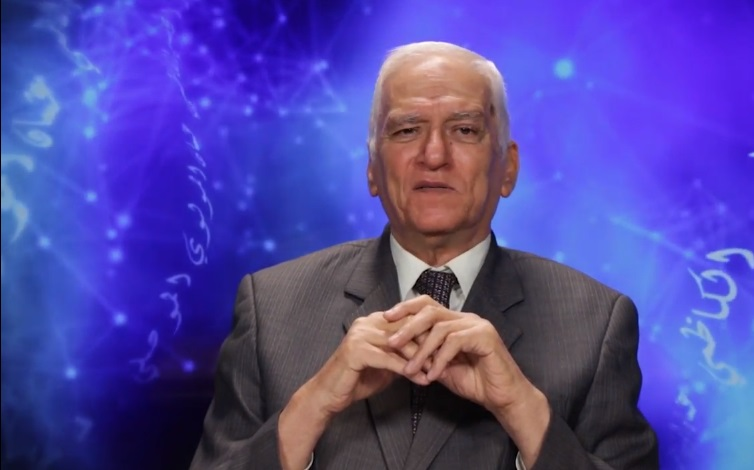
- Imad Abd al-Salam Rauf in 2018
- Born: 1948; Baghdad, Kingdom of Iraq
- Died: 27 June 2021 (aged 72–73); Erbil, Iraq
- Children: 3

Imad Abdul Salam Raouf (Baghdad 1948–June 27, 2021) was an Iraqi historian, investigator, and thinker.

== His birth and upbringing ==
Imad Abd al-Salam Raouf al-Attar was born in Baghdad in 1948, from a family of Mosuli origin, of Abbasid descent, and received his primary education there. He grew up in the locality of Al-Saadoun, then he moved with people to a modern house in the Raghbet Khatoun area. He studied in Raghba Khatoun in the Hariri school, then Al-Nairat School, then Al-Qabas Primary School in the Al-Aqoulia locality, then Al-Mamounia Primary School in Al-Waziriya, then the Sharkia School in Raghbet Khatoun. Then they moved in 1961 to Al-Yarmouk and studied there at Al-Mamoun Intermediate School.

== Education ==
He studied at the University of Baghdad "College of Arts / Department of History" and graduated in 1970. Then he continued his higher studies at Cairo University and obtained a master's degree in modern history in 1973, for his thesis (The State of Mosul in the Galilee Era 1749–1834). He received a doctorate in 1976 at the same university for his thesis (Social life in Iraq during the Mamluk era 1750–1831).

== Career ==
He was assigned the head of the Center for the Revival of Arab Scientific Heritage at the University of Baghdad. and Professor of Modern History at Ibn Rushd College of Education (University of Baghdad).

A number of theses have been written about his work in many Arab universities. Some of his books have been translated into English, French, Turkish, Persian, Kurdish, Indonesian and Chinese. He published dozens of research papers in many journals Scientific, academic and court, including:

Sumer (Baghdad) Arab Historian (Baghdad) Al-Mawrid (Baghdad) Journal of the Iraqi International Council (Baghdad) Rafidain Literature (Mosul) Contemporary Muslim (Cairo) Islamic Knowledge (Malaysia) Renewal (Malaysia) Science and Faith (Khartoum) Umm Al-Qura University Journal (Mecca) Al-Mutar (Morocco) Al-Insan (Paris) Islamic Studies (Pakistan) Journal of Islamic History (India) Perspectives on Culture and Heritage (United Arab Emirates) Yearbook of the College of Sharia, Law and Islamic Studies (Doha) Al-Afaaq (Oman) Publishing hundreds of articles, cultural research and historical works (study theorizing, criticism and creativity) in nearly seventy Arab and Islamic magazines and newspapers.

== His opinions ==
- The importance of history in peoples lives by presenting an image of the roots to which that people belongs, History represents the identity of each people, for when concepts are disrupted, only history remains a fixed identity for a people. A nation that is ignorant of its history is a nation without an identity, and whoever does not have an identity can fall victim to others and fall under constant challenges influence. Perhaps his convictions would be disturbed and he took a course that was detrimental to his national interests.
- We must remember that the American dream of the future is also based on an understanding of history. Many say that the new world was born when it was discovered by Christopher Columbus. Although the new world is an extension of the old world, it is an evolution from it, and it is a new birth for it. Man in America is a cumulative product of many civilizations that he was able to interact with lively in order to transform this interaction into energy that pushes him forward. This is a general rule, but we were satisfied with looking at the past and admiring it, meaning stopping by it and turning it into something like an endless lunch, even though its time is over and we need a new food. That is, to conform with our time in which we live, and to build for a future time. They also benefited from their present and their past, as American civilization is the daughter of European civilization.
- Those who promoted globalization as the last crucible for the fusion of civilizations into one global civilization and heralded the emergence of a single global political system that would abolish the plurality of nations and the plurality of cultures, nationalities, religions, concepts and values, These heralded the end of history. Those who said that this is the end of history, were right, if their intention of globalization was to abolish these pluralities, these identities, and these values. Yes, they are right. Because there will be nothing left but one totalitarian regime, one economy, and one state that imposes its hegemony on the whole world. But I see that this is something that has not been experienced yet, and we cannot evaluate this new experience, There is diversity, what is necessary for the continuation of life, and the abolition of this diversity means that the world will end, as they say, and we believe in view of this great diversity of values, civilizations and cultures, that the end they said, is not achieved, and it is at least not experienced for now.
- These nations should search for their strengths, as Japan imposes itself with its technological empire, and the European Union imposes its entity or importance through what is produced, and so are other nations, In the sense that we have to work in order to elevate ourselves so that we can stand, not directly at the top, because this is not possible and we will not be able to do so, except after generations that we do not know, but at least to stand in the club of countries, say the twenty or thirty developed in the world .
- The problem is our delay in “work.” They worked and created their present and their future, benefited from their past and interacted with it and made their present, and they are now building for their future. As for us, we do not work, and there is no difference between us and them except work, and so that we do not perish, we must work, because in the event of our disappearance the world will lose itself, because it will lose an element that can play a role in the continuation of history. Extinction is not intended for the physical aspect, but the spiritual aspect of existence, because we will be expelled from the circle of life and live enslaved to those who worked and enslaved us, as is happening now in the world, there are peoples threatened with extinction, as is the case in Africa, which is threatened with extinction with famines and civil wars.

== Death ==
Imad Abdul Salam Raouf died in the city of Erbil, on June 27, 2021, at the age of 73.

== Books ==
- Butter of the obvious effects on earthly accidents by Yassin Al-Omari, Najaf 1974
- Al-Durar Al-Nuzama and Sealed Coils, by Khalil Al-Busairi, Baghdad 1975
- Diwan Al-Ashari. In partnership with Hajj Walid Al-Azami, Baghdad 1977
- Jewels and their attributes, and in which country they are the recipes of divers and merchants. Cairo, The Egyptian Book House 1976 and Abu Dhabi, The Cultural Foundation 1997
- The real facts in the Iraqi revolution by Ali Al-Bazarkan, second edition (research and submission), Baghdad / Arab Renaissance Library 1991
- Mutla’ Al-Saud with good news of Minister Daoud Pasha (Wali of Baghdad). Study and achieve. 1st floor: Mosul, Dar Al-Hikma 1991 and 2nd floor: Beirut, Al-Arabiya for Encyclopedias 2009.
- The History of Scientific Families in Baghdad by Sayyid Muhammad Saeed Al-Rawi. Study and achieve. Baghdad, Cultural Affairs, 1st Edition: 1997, 2nd Edition: 2008.
- Houses of Baghdad in the thirteenth century AH by Abd al-Rahman Hilmi al-Abbasi al-Suhrawardi. Study and achieve. Baghdad, Al-Jawad Office, 1997.
- The book Al-Hawadith Al-Jami`ah, attributed to Ibn Al-Fawti, study and investigation, in partnership with Bashar Awwad Maarouf, Beirut, Dar Al-Gharb Al-Islami 1997
- Iraq in the Documents of Muhammad Ali, Baghdad, House of Wisdom 1999
- Mutla’ Al-Saud with the good news of Minister Daoud. Study and achieve. 1st floor: Mosul, Dar Al-Hikma 1991 and 2nd floor: Beirut, Al-Arabiya for Encyclopedias 2009.
- Fakhri's memoirs, study and investigation. Baghdad, Matth Al-Muthanna 2000
- Clarification and Clarification in the Measuring and Balance of Ibn al-Rafa’a, Study and Investigation. Baghdad, Cultural Affairs 1980
- Diwan of Abdul Rahman Al-Suwaidi. In partnership with Walid Al-Adhamy. Baghdad, Dar Al-Rajaa 2000
- The Kingdom of Saudi Arabia between the two world wars, in light of the reports of the Iraqi Consulate in Jeddah. Amman, Dar Degla 2006
- The History of Al-Zubayr and Al-Basrah by Ibn Al-Imlas. Study and investigation, Amman Dar Dijla 2006
- Al-Zawraa garden in the biography of ministers, by Abdul Rahman Al-Suwaidi, study and investigation, Baghdad, the Scientific Academy, 2002
- The Poets’ Ticket by Abdul Qadir Al-Shahrbani, the complete original, study and investigation, Baghdad, the Scientific Academy, 2002
- Studies in the history of the Arabs before Islam and the late Islamic eras. Preparation and presentation, two parts, Baghdad, Cultural Affairs 2002
- History of the Karagul. Baghdad, Anwar Tigris, 2006
- Al-Matraqi Zadeh's Journey Study and Investigation, Abu Dhabi, The Cultural Foundation 2005
- Paths of sight in the kingdoms of the regions. Part 22, Abu Dhabi Cultural Foundation 2005
- The musky whiff in the Meccan journey of Abdullah Al-Suwaidi. Study and investigation, Abu Dhabi, the Cultural Foundation 2004 and 2nd floor: Beirut, Arabic for Encyclopedias 2012
- Durr scattered in the writings of the renewal of the fourteenth century. Baghdad, Anwar Tigris, 2004
- The Brilliant Contract in the Antiquities of Baghdad, Mosques and Mosques by Abdul Hamid Ubadah. Study and investigation, Baghdad, Anwar Tigris, 2004
- Mosques of Baghdad in the writings of the ancestors. Study and investigation, Baghdad, Dar Al-Rajaa, 2006
- Memoirs of Abdul Majeed Mahmoud, Minister in the Royal Era in Iraq. London, House of Wisdom 2008
- Khair Al-Zad in the History of the Mosques and Mosques of Baghdad by Muhammad Saeed Al-Rawi. Study and achieve. 1st Floor, Baghdad, Sunni Endowment 2006 and 2nd Floor, Ministry of Culture 2014
- The Journey of Taha Al-Kurdi Al-Balisani in Iraq, Anatolia, the Levant, Egypt and the Hijaz. Study and achieve. 1st floor: Baghdad, Kurdish culture 2001, 2nd floor: Mokhryani Erbil 2007
- News of Baghdad and its environs, by Mr. Mahmoud Shukri Al-Alusi. Beirut 1st floor, Arabic for Encyclopedias 2008 and 2nd floor, Ministry of Culture 2011
- Memoirs of Qasim Muhammad Al-Rajab. Study and achieve. Beirut, Arabic for Encyclopedias 2008
- The Ziuki tree, a document of the lineage and history of the princes of Hidinan. Erbil, Interpretation Office 2009
- Kindergarten news in the mention of good people. Sulaymaniyah, Zain 2010, 2nd floor, Beirut, Al Arabiya for Encyclopedias 2011
- The Roman and Egyptian Journeys. Written by Fadlallah Al Mohebi. Investigation. Damascus, Dar Al-Zaman 2012
- Roses to the Ministers’ Garden, written by Muhammad Saeed Al-Suwaidi. Investigation. Damascus, Dar Al-Zaman 2012
- The joy of the Brotherhood in the remembrance of Minister Suleiman. Written by Mahmoud Al-Rahbi. Investigation. Damascus, Dar Al-Zaman 2015
- A trip from Nablus to Islambol. Written by Abdul Qadir Abu Al-Saud Al-Maqdisi. Damascus, Dar Al-Zaman 2015
- The Egyptian Homeland Works by an author from the ninth century AH. Investigation. Cairo, Arab Knowledge Bureau 2015
- Ticket Trackers. by participating. Investigation. Kurdish Academy. Erbil, Salahaddin University, 2016
- The Writers' Picnic in the Biography of Scholars, Ministers and Supervisors of the City of Peace, Baghdad. Investigation. Damascus, Dar Al-Zaman 2016.

=== Authored books ===
- Baghdad Schools in the Abbasid Era, Baghdad, Dar Al-Basri 1966
- The Wilayat of Mosul in the Ottoman Era, the period of local government, Najaf, knowledgeable about literature, 1975
- The call of Abi Hashem and his party, a study in the dawn of the Abbasid call. Baghdad Dar Al-Jahiz 1978
- Encyclopedia of "The Calligraphic Artifacts in the Qadiriyah Library". Five parts:
  - Part One, Sciences of the Qur’an and Hadith, Baghdad Al-Irshad Press, 1973
  - Part Two, Jurisprudence, Baghdad, Dar Al-Resala 1978
  - Part III, Baghdad, Dar Al-Maaref 1979
  - Part IV, Baghdad House of Knowledge 1980
  - Part V, Al-Majmo`, Baghdad, Dar Al-Maaref, 1980.
- The eastern borders of the Arab world, jointly, Baghdad House of Freedom 1981
- Modern and Contemporary History of the Arab World, Participation, Baghdad, Ministry of Education 1981
- Linguistic interpretation in Al-Ahwaz, a documentary study, Baghdad, Dar Al-Hurriya, 1982
- Iran Historical Perspective, Baghdad House of Freedom 1982
- The Arab Emirate of Kaab in the Eighteenth Century, Baghdad, Dar Al-Hurriya, 1982
- Iraqi History and Historians in the Ottoman Era, Edition 1, Baghdad, Wasit House 1983, and Edition 2, revised and augmented, London, House of Wisdom 2009. Dr. Abdul-Wahhab Chang from the Center for Islamic Studies at Langu University has translated chapters from history books and historians in the Ottoman era into Chinese, chosen by him.Dr. Jamal Al-Din Faleh Al-Kilani, and it was published in the Gansu State Journal, successively, with a thorough translation by the author 2016.
- Glimpses of Modern Arab History. Baghdad, Arab Labor Organization 1983
- Calligraphic Antiquities in the Mosque of Sayyid Sultan Ali in Baghdad. Baghdad, Center for the Revival of Scientific Heritage 1984
- Battle of Ain Jalut. Baghdad, Freedom House 1986
- Kant, features of his life and intellectual work. Baghdad, Cultural Affairs 1982. Translated into the Kurdish language with the title: Kant, Namouna Yeh K Zayan and Karah Fikri Kani, Erbil 2005.
- The High School in Baghdad, Baghdad House of Cultural Affairs 1986
- History of Public Women's Services in Iraq, Baghdad, General Union of Iraqi Women 1986
- Arabs writing their history in the Ottoman era. Baghdad, Cultural Affairs 1988
- One of the pioneers of education in Iraq, Muhammad Raouf Al-Attar, Baghdad, Mat Asaad 1988
- Abdullah Al-Suwaidi, his biography and journey. Baghdad, Cultural Affairs 1986
- Ruling families and men of administration and the judiciary in Iraq in the later centuries. Baghdad, the House of Wisdom, 1991.
- Catalog of the Manuscripts of Sayyid Muhammad Saeed Al-Rawi in Baghdad, Baghdad, Center for the Revival of Arab Scientific Heritage, 1993
- The historical origins of the names of Baghdad stores. Baghdad, Amanat Baghdad 1994
- Dia Jaafar, biography and memories. Baghdad, Matt Al-Adeeb 1997
- Adela Khatun, a page from the history of Iraq. 1st floor, Baghdad, Al-Jawadeen Office, 1998.
- Al-Sharq Library, its history and manuscripts, Baghdad, Dar Al-Raja’ 1998
- The historical origins of Baghdad shops. Baghdad, 1st Floor, Mat Al-Muthanna 2004, 2nd Floor, Ministry of Culture, 2014
- Landmarks of Baghdad in the Late Centuries. Baghdad, the first edition of the House of Wisdom 2000, and the second edition, expanded, the Sunni Endowment, Baghdad 2016
- History of the old drinking water projects in Baghdad. Baghdad, House of Cultural Affairs 2001
- Realization of scientific manuscripts. Baghdad 2006
- Studies in gemology for the Arabs. Baghdad, Al-Muthanna Press 2005
- Submerged cultural centers in Kurdistan. 1st floor: Baghdad, Kurdish Culture House 1998, 2nd floor: Expanded, Erbil, Mokhryani 2008
- Hit in history. Baghdad 2004
- Abla Al-Azzawi, A Journey Between Water and Mud. Baghdad, 2005
- Sheikh Al-Islam Sultan Bin Nasser Al-Jubouri. Erbil 2008
- Documentary Studies in the Modern History and Civilization of the Kurds. 1st floor, Erbil, Ministry of Culture, 2008
- The journey of the Turkish leader Sidi Ali and other studies. Beirut, Arabic for Encyclopedias 2009
- Safa’ al-Din Issa al-Bandaniji, his biography and writings. Erbil, Mt Manara 2009
- Muhammad Saeed Al-Zahawi, his biography and manuscripts. Erbil, Mt Manara 2009
- Sultan Hussein al-Wali Amir Bahdinan. Erbil, Mt Manara 2009
- Historical Dictionary of the Emirate of Bahdinan. Kurdish Academy. Erbil, Mat Hashem 2011
- Ibrahim Al-Kurani Al-Shahrazouri. Erbil, Matt Manara 2010
- Evidence of the Royal Cemetery in Amadiyah. Kurdish Academy. Erbil, Mat Hashem 2011
- Abdul Karim Qassem in his personal file. Zain Foundation, Sulaymaniyah 2012
- Documentary Studies in the Modern History and Civilization of the Kurds. An updated edition with new studies. Damascus, Dar Al-Zaman 2012
- Index of suspended Baghdad offices. Baghdad, Sunni Endowment Diwan 2013
- Iraq as drawn by Al-Matraqi Zadeh. Beirut, Al-Alamy Foundation 2014
- Adela Khatun, a page from the history of Iraq. An additional edition with iron documents. Damascus, Dar Al-Zaman 2015
- Modern Syriac Historians: A Study of the Evolution of the Historical Research Methodology. Beirut, Dar Al-Rafidain - Canada 2015
- Egyptian Rural Words in the Seventeenth Century. Cairo, Arab Knowledge Bureau 2015
- The Arab Gulf in the reports of Al-Zawraa newspaper correspondents. Cairo, Arab Knowledge Bureau 2015
- Geography of Ibn al-Bitar. Cairo, Arab Knowledge Bureau 2015
- Princes and Scholars from Kurdistan in the Ottoman Era. Damascus, Arab Knowledge Bureau 2016
- From the History of Women's Public Services in Baghdad, translated into English, French and Spanish, Dar Al-Mamoun in Baghdad 2014, and published in Arabic on the Internet, Alalukah Network 2015
- Endowment of books in Baghdad. Published online, Alukah Network 2015
- Diplomatic and cultural aspects of the history of the Kurds in the Ottoman era, Damascus, Dar Al-Zaman
- Studies in History and Heritage, two parts, Tafsir Library, Erbil 2019.
- Presentation and review of the book The Geography of Al-Baz Al-Ashhab - by the historian Jamal Al-Din Faleh Al-Kilani, Dar Al-Islam, Lahore, 2019.
- Memoirs of Imad Abdel Salam Raouf: The Sheikh of Contemporary Historians and Investigators - Presented by Jamal Al-Din Faleh Al-Kilani, carefully by Raouf Al-Attar, Dijla House in Jordan 2021.
