= Cecilia Trifogli =

Italian philosopher and academic

- Born: 7 February 1961 (age 65); Rome, Italy
- Citizenship: United Kingdom

Education
- Education: University of Pisa, Italy Laurea; University of Milan, Italy (Postgraduate work)

Cecilia Trifogli, FBA (born 7 February 1961) is an Italian philosopher and academic. She has been Professor of Medieval Philosophy at the University of Oxford since 2008, and a Fellow of All Souls College since 1999. Her research focuses on philosophy in the Middle Ages, including epistemology, metaphysics, and the reception of Aristotle's philosophy.

== Early life ==
Trifogli was born on 7 February 1961 in Rome, Italy. She was educated at the University of Pisa, graduating with a Laurea in Philosophy in 1986 and a Laurea in Mathematics in 1995. She then undertook postgraduate studies at the University of Milan from 1996 to 2000.

== Academic career ==
In October 1999, she joined the University of Oxford as a lecturer in philosophy. In 2008, she was appointed Professor of Medieval Philosophy.

She is (since 2008) chairman of the British Academy Medieval Texts Editorial Committee, and president of the 'Aristoteles Latinus' Commission of the International Society for the Study of Medieval Philosophy.

== Honours ==
In 2014 she was elected a Fellow of the British Academy, the United Kingdom's national academy for the humanities and social sciences.
