= Julia M. H. Smith =

English medievalist (born 1956)

Julia M. H. Smith FSA Scot FRSE FRHistS
- Born: Julia Mary Howard Smith; 29 May 1956 (age 70); Cambridge, England
- Occupations: Historian and academic
- Title: Chichele Professor of Medieval History
- Spouse: Hamish Scott (m. 2005; died 2022)

Academic background
- Education: South Hampstead High School
- Alma mater: Newnham College, Cambridge; Corpus Christi College, Oxford
- Thesis: Carolingian Brittany (1985)
- Doctoral advisor: J. M. Wallace-Hadrill

Academic work
- Institutions: University of Sheffield; University of St Andrews; University of Manchester; Trinity College, Connecticut; Newnham College, Cambridge; University of Glasgow; All Souls College, Oxford
- Notable works: Europe after Rome: a New Cultural History 500–1000

Julia Mary Howard Smith, FSA Scot, FRSE, FRHistS (born 29 May 1956) is an English medievalist who was the Chichele Professor of Medieval History at All Souls College, Oxford from 2016 to 2025. She was formerly Edwards Professor of Medieval History at the University of Glasgow.

== Early life and education ==
Smith was born on 29 May 1956 in Cambridge, Cambridgeshire, England. She was educated at South Hampstead High School, an all-girls Private school in London. She studied at Newnham College, Cambridge, from 1975 to 1978, followed by postgraduate study at Corpus Christi College, Oxford, from 1978 to 1981. Her doctoral supervisor was J. M. Wallace-Hadrill, one of Smith's predecessors in the Chichele chair.

== Academic career ==
Smith lectured at the University of Sheffield, the University of St Andrews, and the University of Manchester in the 1980s. In 1986, she was appointed an assistant professor at Trinity College, Hartford, Connecticut. From 1988-89 Smith held the Kathleen Hughes Memorial Research Fellowship at Newnham College, Cambridge, named in honour of Smith's undergraduate director of studies. In 1995, she returned to the University of St Andrews as Reader in Medieval History, where she served as University Lead for Equal Opportunities and taught the university's first courses in women's history. In 2005, she was appointed Edwards Professor of Medieval History at the University of Glasgow.

In 2016, Smith was appointed Chichele Professor of Medieval History at the University of Oxford and elected a fellow of All Souls College, Oxford. She gave her inaugural lecture as Chichele Professor on 31 January 2019: it was titled "Thinking with Things: Reframing Relics in the Early Middle Ages". Smith retired from the chair in 2025 and was succeeded by Alice Rio.

She has held a range of international research fellowships. From 1999 to 2000 she was a fellow at the Netherlands Institute of Advanced Study and in 2001 and 2013 she held a fellowship at the Shelby Cullom Davis Center for Historical Studies, Princeton.

== Personal life ==
In 2005, Smith married fellow historian Hamish Scott.

== Honours and awards ==
In 2010 she delivered the Raleigh Lecture on the subject of relics in the Medieval West. In 2011 she was elected as a Fellow of the Royal Society of Edinburgh. Smith delivered the Birbkbeck lecture series at Trinity College, Cambridge in 2018, on the subject "The Religious Life of Things in Early Christianity".

== Selected publications ==
- Province and Empire: Brittany and the Carolingians. Cambridge University Press, Cambridge, 1992.
- "Einhard: the sinner and the saint", Transactions of the Royal Historical Society (Sixth series), 13, 2003, pp. 55–77.
- Europe after Rome: a New Cultural History 500–1000. Oxford University Press, Oxford, 2005. ISBN 9780192892638
- Early Medieval Christianities, c. 600 – c. 1100, Cambridge University Press, Cambridge, 2008. ISBN 9780521817752 (Edited with T. F. X. Noble)
- "Portable Christianity: relics in the Medieval west (c. 700 – c. 1200)" in Proceedings of the British Academy, 2012, 181 . pp. 143–167. ISSN 0068-1202
