= Avner Offer =

British historian

Avner Offer (born 1944) is an economic historian who held the Chichele Professorship in Economic history at the University of Oxford, England. He is an Emeritus Fellow of All Souls College, Oxford, and a fellow of the British Academy. He has published on international political economy, law, the First World War and land tenure. During the 1990s and 2000s, Offer's main interest was in post-war economic growth, particularly in developed societies, and the challenges that affluence presents to well being. His most recent work is on the strife between neoclassical economics and social democracy, each of them vying to shape the post-war decades. Apart from his academic work, he has published a memoir of the Six Day War in Israel.

== Biography ==
He was born on 15 May 1944 in Mandatory Palestine, the son of Zvi and Ivriyah Offer, and was educated at the Western Valley school in the Yifat kibbutz. He studied at the Hebrew University of Jerusalem, graduating B.A. in 1973. At St Antony's College, Oxford and Merton College he graduated M.A. 1976 and D.Phil. in 1979.

Offer has worked at the University of York, the Australian National University, and the University of Oxford, with research fellowships at the University of Southampton, the University of Cambridge, Rutgers University and New York University. He was a Professorial Fellow at Nuffield College, Oxford, between 1992 and 2000.

== Works ==
Offer's book of 2006, The Challenge of Affluence: Self-Control and Well-Being in the United States and Britain since 1950, represents to some extent a challenge to Neoclassical economics. Through it he argues that "well-being" has in fact lagged behind the increasing affluence of western societies: that "affluence breeds impatience, and impatience undermines well-being...the paradox of affluence and its challenge is that the flow of new rewards can undermine the capacity to enjoy them." The central concepts are therefore future discount, bounded rationality, and myopia.

In the 2016 The Nobel Factor: The Prize in Economics, Social Democracy, and the Market Turn, he argues the Nobel Memorial Prize in Economics has disproportionately been awarded to proponents of the neoclassical school. According to the book's thesis, the Nobel Prize provides a halo of scientific authority but its committee has underrepresented social democracy as a school of economic thought.

== Selected publications ==
- Property and Politics 1870–1914: Landownership, Law, Ideology and Urban Development in England. (Cambridge, 1981, ISBN 0521224144) 464pp.
- The First World War: An Agrarian Interpretation. (Oxford, 1990, ISBN 0-19-821946-6) 472pp.
- "The British empire, 1870–1914: a waste of money?", Economic History Review. Vol 46, 2 (1992) pp. 215–238
- (with S. Bowden), "Household Appliances and the Use of Time in the U.S.A., and Britain since the 1920s", Economic History Review, second series. Vol 47, 4 (1994)
- "Between the gift and the market: The economy of regard", The Economic History Review. Vol 50, 3 (1997) pp. 450–476
- "Costs and Benefits, Prosperity and Security, 1870–1914" in Oxford History of the British Empire, vol. 3, The Nineteenth Century (ed. A. Porter), (Oxford, 1999) pp. 690–711
- Why is the Public Sector so large in Market Societies? The Political Economy of Prudence in the UK, c. 1870–2000. (Oxford, 2003, ISBN 0199514356) 46pp.
- The Challenge of Affluence: Self-control and Well-being in the USA and Britain since 1950. (Oxford, 2006, ISBN 0198208537) 472pp.
- "Obesity Under Affluence varies by Welfare Regimes: The Effect of Fast Food, Insecurity and Inequality", Economics and Human Biology. Vol. 8, (2010), pp. 297–308 (with Rachey Pechey and Stanley Ulijaszek)
- The Nobel Factor: The Prize in Economics, Social Democracy, and the Market Turn (Princeton, 2016, ISBN 9780691166032), 323 pp. (with Gabriel Söderberg).
- Burn Mark: A Photographic Memoir of the Six-Day War (Oxford, 2014, ISBN 9780993105104).
- Understanding the Private-Public Divide: Markets, Governments, and Time Horizons (Cambridge), 227 pp.

== Family ==
Offer married in 1966 Leah Koshet; the couple have two children, a son and a daughter.
