= Geoffrey Baskerville =

British historian (1870–1944)

Geoffrey Baskerville FRHistS (23 August 1870 – 22 July 1944) was a British historian. He is the author of English Monks and the Suppression of the Monasteries, originally published in 1937 and reprinted in 1965. Baskerville also co-wrote The Early History of St. John's College, Oxford and Surrey Incumbents in 1562 (1937). He was a Chichele Lecturer in 1914.

Baskerville was "the son of Colonel J. Baskerville of Crowsley Park, Oxfordshire. He was educated in the Royal Navy and at Christchurch, Oxford."

== Bibliography ==
=== Books ===
- Stevenson, W. H.; Salter, H. E.; Taylor, A. J.; Baskerville, G. (1923). The Early History of St. John's College, Oxford. Oxford, England.
- Baskerville, G (1937). English Monks and the Suppression of the Monasteries. London: Jonathan Cape.

=== Articles ===
- Baskerville, G. (1929). "Elections to Convocation in the Diocese of Gloucester under Bishop Hooper". The English Historical Review. 44 (173): 1–32. ISSN 0013-8266.
- Baskerville, G. (1933). "Married Clergy and Pensioned Religious in Norwich Diocese, 1555". The English Historical Review. 48 (189): 43–64. ISSN 0013-8266.
- Baskerville, G. (1936). "A Sister of Archbishop Cranmer". The English Historical Review. 51 (202): 287–289. ISSN 0013-8266.
- Baskerville, G.; Goodman, A. W. (1937). "Surrey Incumbents in 1562". Surrey Archaeological Collections. 45: 97–115.
- Baskerville, G. (1941). "The Dispossessed Religious in Surrey". Surrey Archaeological Collections. 47: 12–28. doi:10.5284/1068833.
