= Chichele Lectures =

Lecture series hosted by All Souls College, Oxford

The Chichele Lectures are a series of lectures sponsored by All Souls College, Oxford and are an example of the college's use of its income for the general benefit of the University of Oxford. Henry Chichele was the founder of All Souls.

== History ==
The series began formally in 1912, but the idea that All Souls College, Oxford might sponsor an independent series of academic lectures can be dated back to 1873, or even earlier. The college had already started to establish a series of professorships, the Chichele Professorships, beginning with the first two in 1859 and 1862, who delivered their own courses of "Chichele lectures". This series of lectures, separate from the professorships, can be traced to a proposal made in 1873 by Thomas Ryburn Buchanan that the college invite a distinguished foreign professor to lecture. He later withdrew his suggestion in the face of competing ideas. But on 1 June 1909, a proposal was approved that the college would set aside £300 for three "Chichele Lectures" in foreign history, along the lines of the already established Ford Lectures. The first lecture was held in 1912. In 1919, the College widened the lecture to include law, political theory, or economic, as well as foreign and British history. Nevertheless, the lectureship was dormant from 1920 until it was revived again briefly in 1933, but was dormant again until 1947. In recent years, lectures have been given by several lecturers on a common theme as well as continuing the tradition of having a single lecturer. The lectures have normally been given in the Old Library at All Souls, but in 1959 it was moved for the first time to accommodate the great crowd drawn by Field Marshal Montgomery.

== Lecturers ==
- 1912 H. A. L. Fisher, "The Napoleonic Influence in Europe"
- 1912 Henri Pirenne, "Les Phases principales du développement politique, économique, et sociale en Belgique"
- 1913 Henry William Carless Davis, " The Age of Gregory VII"
- 1914 Geoffrey Baskerville, "The Age of Boniface VII"
- 1920 Sir George Prothero, "The Second Empire and the Rise of Germany"
- 1933 Ernst Cassirer, "Die Philosophie des Rechts"
- 1933 Jacob Marschak, "Quantitative Methods in Economics"
- 1947 Bertil Ohlin, "Some Problems in Monetary Theory and Policy"
- 1948 Arnold Toynbee, "Recurrence and Uniqueness in History"
- 1949 J. Dover Wilson, "Shakespeare and the War of the Roses"
- 1950 Edward M. Earle, "The American Stake in Europe, 1900-1950"
- 1951 Federico Chabod, "Some Aspects of Italian Foreign Policy, 1870-1919"
- 1952 R. H. Gabriel, "Jefferson; Emerson; Thoreau; William James; Melville"
- 1953 Harold Nicolson, "The Evolution of Diplomatic Method"
- 1954 Edgar Wind, "Art and Scholarship under Julius II"
- 1955 C. S. Lewis, "Milton"
- 1957 Arthur Waley, "The Opium War Seen through Chinese Eyes"
- 1959 Field Marshal Lord Montgomery, "The Conflict between East and West"
- 1960 Clement Attlee, "Changes in the Conception and Structure of the British Empire during the Last Half Century"
- 1961 Elias Avery Lowe, [On Paleography]
- 1962 Richard Hoggart, "Artist, Organizations, and Audiences"
- 1964 F. R. Leavis, "Dickens: Art and Social Criticism"
- 1964 Owen Lattimore, "Between the Great Wall and Siberia"
- 1965 Lionel Robbins, "The Theory of economics in the History of Economic Thought"
- 1967 R. Birley, "The British Empire in Prospect and Retrospect"
- 1969 George F. Kennan, "The Marquis de Custine and the Russia of 1839"
