= Roger Hood =

British criminologist (1936–2020)

Roger Grahame Hood, CBE, FBA (12 June 1936 – 17 November 2020) was a British criminologist. From 1996 to 2003, he was professor of criminology at the University of Oxford; he was also a fellow of All Souls College, Oxford, from 1973 to 2003. He was elected a fellow of the British Academy in 1992 and was appointed a Commander of the Order of the British Empire (CBE) in 1995.

Faculty of Law at the University Oxford conducts an annual lecture series to "honour and celebrate the long and distinguished career of Professor Roger Hood.."

== Publications ==
- Sentencing in Magistrate's Courts (London: Stevens, 1962)
- Borstal Re-Assessed (London: Heinemann, 1965)
- Homeless Borstal Boys (London: Bell and Co., 1966)
- (with Richard F. Sparks) Key Issues in Criminology (London: Weidenfeld and Nicolson, 1970)
- Sentencing the Motoring Offender (London: Heinemann, 1972)
- (Editor) Crime, Criminology and Public Policy: Essays in Honour of Sir Leon Radzinowicz (London: Heinemann, 1974)
- (with Sir Leon Radzinowicz) Criminology and Criminal Justice: A Bibliography (London: Mansell, 1976)
- (with Sir Leon Radzinowicz) A History of English Criminal Law and Its Administration, vol. 5: The Emergence of Penal Policy (London: Stevens, 1986)
  - Reprinted as: (with Sir Leon Radzinowicz) The Emergence of Penal Policy in Victorian and Edwardian England (Oxford: Oxford University Press, 1990)
- The Death Penalty: A World-Wide Perspective (Oxford: Oxford University Press, 1988; 2nd edn, 1996; 3rd edn, 2002; 4th edn (with Carolyn Hoyle), 2008; 5th edn (with Carolyn Holyle), 2015)
- (with Graça Cordovil) Race and Sentencing (Oxford: Oxford University Press, 1992)
- (with Stephen Shute) The Parole System at Work: A Study of Risk-Based Decision-Making, Home Office Research Study, vol. 202 (London: Home Office, 2000)
- (with Martina Feilzer) Difference or Discrimination?: Ethnic Minorities in the Youth Justice System (London: Youth Justice Board, 2004)
- (with Stephen Shute and Florence Seemungal) A Fair Hearing? Ethnic Minorities in the Criminal Courts (Cullompton: Willan Publishing, 2005)
- (editor, with Surya Deva) Confronting Capital Punishment in Asia: Human Rights, Politics and Public Opinion (Oxford: Oxford University Press, 2013)
