= Stanley Bertram Chrimes =

British educator and historian

- Born: 23 February 1907; Sidcup, Kent, England
- Died: 21 July 1984 (aged 77); Penarth, Glamorgan, Wales
- Education: King's College London; Trinity College, Cambridge
- Spouse: Mabel Keyser (m. 1937)

Stanley Bertram Chrimes (23 February 1907 in Sidcup, Kent, England – 21 July 1984 in Penarth, Glamorgan, Wales) was head of the department of history at University College, Cardiff, University of Wales, and a noted biographer of Henry VII of England. He taught at the University of Glasgow from 1937 to 1952.

== Personal life ==
Chrimes married Mabel Keyser on 8 June 1937 and they remained together until his death. The couple had no children.

== Selected publications ==
- Sir John Fortescue, De Laudibus Legum Anglie, University Press, Cambridge, 1942. Edited and translated with introduction and notes by S. B. Chrimes.
- English constitutional history, Oxford University Press, Oxford, 1947. (Home University Library of Modern Knowledge No. 199)
- The general election in Glasgow, February, 1950: Essays by members of the staff of the University of Glasgow, Jackson, Son & Co., Glasgow, 1950.
- An introduction to the administrative history of mediaeval England, Blackwell, Oxford, 1952. (Studies in mediaeval history series No. 7)
- Select documents of English constitutional history, 1307–1485, A & C Black, London, 1961. (With Alfred Lawson Brown)
- Lancastrians, Yorkists and Henry VII, Macmillan, London, 1964.
- Henry VII, Methuen, London, 1972. (Now published in the Yale English Monarchs series)
