= Vaughan Lowe =

British legal academic and international lawyer, born 1952

Vaughan Lowe KC
- Born: Alan Vaughan Lowe; 1952 (age 73–74); Smethwick, England
- Education: University of Wales
- Occupation: Lawyer

Alan Vaughan Lowe KC (born 1952) is a barrister and academic specialising in the field of international law. Chichele Professor of Public International Law in the University of Oxford, and a Fellow of All Souls College, Oxford, 1999–2012; Emeritus Professor of International Law and Emeritus Fellow of All Souls College, University of Oxford, since 2012; visiting professor, University of Chichester, 2024.

He was previously Reader in International Law and a Fellow of Corpus Christi College in Cambridge University, and taught at the Manchester University and Cardiff University and, as a visiting professor, at universities in Europe, Asia and the USA.

Lowe took his LLB, LLM and PhD degrees at the University of Wales in Cardiff, and was awarded MA degrees by Cambridge and Oxford Universities and honorary LLD degrees by the University of Athens and the University of Chichester. He was called to the Bar by Gray's Inn, of which he is a Bencher, and took silk, becoming Queen's Counsel in 2008 (now, King's Counsel).

He was awarded the Order of the Rising Sun, Gold Rays with Neck Ribbon by Japan in 2008, and made a Cavaler, Ordinul National Serviciul Credincios (Knight of the Faithful Service National Order) by Romania in 2009. In 2010 he was awarded the Order of Paduka Seri Laila Jasa by Brunei, and in 2017 was awarded the Grand Cross, Order of El Sol Del Péru, by Peru. He was awarded the Collar Degree, Order of Timor-Leste, by Timor-Leste in 2024.

He is a member of the Institut de droit international.

== Notable cases ==
As arbitrator or judge

• Dispute Concerning Coastal State Rights in the Black Sea, Sea of Azov, and Kerch Strait (Ukraine v. the Russian Federation), PCA, 2017 – (Arbitrator, appointed by Ukraine)
• Arbitration Between the Republic of Croatia and the Republic of Slovenia, PCA 2012 – 2017 (Arbitrator, appointed by European Commission)
• Kononov v. Latvia, European Court of Human Rights, 2009 – 2011 (Ad hoc judge, appointed by Latvia)
• Achmea (formerly Eureko) v. Slovakia, UNCITRAL / PCA, 2008 -– 2012 (President of arbitral tribunal, appointed by agreement)
• Barbados v. Trinidad & Tobago maritime delimitation, PCA 2004 –2006 (Arbitrator, appointed by Barbados)
• Judge, European Nuclear Energy Tribunal 2006 – 2014 (nominated by UK)

As counsel
• Application of the Convention on the Prevention and Punishment of the Crime of Genocide in the Gaza Strip (South Africa v. Israel) ICJ 2024- (for South Africa)
• Request for an Advisory Opinion submitted by the Commission of Small Island States on Climate Change and International Law, International Tribunal for the Law of the Sea, 2023 – (for the Commission of Small Island States)
• Application of the International Convention on the Elimination of All Forms of Racial Discrimination, ICJ, 2021- (for Azerbaijan)
• ICAO Appeal, and Application of the International Convention on the Elimination of All Forms of Racial Discrimination, ICJ 2018 – 2021 (for Qatar)
• Alleged Violations of the 1955 Treaty of Amity, Economic Relations, and Consular Rights (Islamic Republic of Iran v. United States of America), ICJ 2018 – (for Iran)
• Timor Sea Conciliation (Timor-Leste v. Australia), UNCLOS Conciliation, 2016-2018 (for Timor-Leste)
• Land Boundary in the Northern Part of Isla Portillos, ICJ 2017 (for Nicaragua)
• Certain Iranian Assets (Islamic Republic of Iran v. United States of America), ICJ 2016 – 2023 (for Iran)
• Maritime Delimitation in the Caribbean Sea and the Pacific Ocean (Costa Rica v. Nicaragua), ICJ 2014 - 2018 (for Nicaragua)
• Railway Land arbitration, (Malaysia/Singapore) PCA 2014 (for Singapore)
• Questions relating to the Seizure and Detention of Certain Documents and Data (Timor-Leste v. Australia), ICJ 2013-2015 (for Timor-Leste)
• Arbitration under the Timor Sea Treaty (Timor-Leste v. Australia), PCA 2013-2017 (for Timor-Leste)
• Alleged Violations of Sovereign Rights and Maritime Spaces in the Caribbean Sea (Nicaragua v. Colombia), ICJ 2013 - 2022 (for Nicaragua)
• Question of the Delimitation of the Continental Shelf between Nicaragua and Colombia beyond 200 nautical miles from the Nicaraguan Coast (Nicaragua v. Colombia), ICJ 2013 – 2023 (for Nicaragua)
• Obligation to Negotiate Access to the Pacific Ocean (Bolivia v. Chile), ICJ 2013 - 2018 (for Bolivia)
• Whaling in the Antarctic (Australia v. Japan: New Zealand intervening), ICJ 2010 - 2014 (for Japan)
• Maritime Dispute (Peru v. Chile), ICJ, 2008 - 2014 (for Peru)
• Territorial and Maritime Dispute (Nicaragua v. Colombia), ICJ, 2001 - 2012 (for Nicaragua)
• Indus Waters Kishenganga Arbitration (Pakistan v. India), PCA, 2011 - 2013 (for Pakistan)
• Maritime Delimitation in the Black Sea (Romania v. Ukraine), ICJ 2009 (for Romania)
• Request for Interpretation of the Judgment of 31 March 2004 in the Case concerning Avena and Other Mexican Nationals (Mexico v. United States of America), ICJ 2008 (for the USA)
• Varnava and Others v. Turkey, Grand Chamber ECHR, 2008 (for the Republic of Cyprus)
• R (Al Jedda) v. Secretary of State for Defence [2007] UKHL 58 (for appellant Mr Al Jedda)
• The Hoshinmaru and The Tomimaru (Japan v. Russia) ITLOS, 2007 (for Japan)
• R v. Jones[2006] UKHL 16, [2004] EWCA Crim 1981 (for appellants Mr Pritchard and Mr Olditch)
• Legal Consequences of the Construction of a Wall in the Occupied Palestinian Territory, ICJ, 2004 (for Palestine)
• Land Reclamation by Singapore in and around the Straits of Johor (Malaysia v. Singapore), ITLOS and PCA, 2003 - 2005, (for Singapore)
• The MOX Plant Case (Ireland v. United Kingdom), UNCLOS arbitration, 2003 (for Ireland)
• Azinas v. Cyprus, Grand Chamber ECHR, 2003 (for the Republic of Cyprus)
• Southern Bluefin Tuna cases, ad hoc arbitral tribunal, 2000 (for Japan)

== Publications ==
- The Law of the Sea, 4th edition (with Robin Churchill and Amy Sander) (Manchester University Press, 2021). Pp. lxix and 897. ISBN 978-1-5261-6480-3. 3rd edition (with R R Churchill) (Manchester University Press, 1999). Pp. xlix and 494. ISBN 978-0-7190-4382-6. 2nd edition (with R R Churchill) (Manchester University Press, 1988). Pp. xxxviii and 370. 1st edition Manchester University Press, 1983; reprinted with addenda 1985). Pp. xxi and 321. ISBN 978-0-7190-0936-5.
- International Law. A Very Short Introduction, (Oxford University Press. 2016), PP. 144
- Joint editor (with J R Crawford) British Year Book of International Law, (1999 – 2011) (Oxford University Press).
- The United Nations Security Council and War, (Oxford University Press, 2008), Vaughan Lowe, Adam Roberts, Jennifer Welsh and Dominik Zaum (eds.), Pp. 793. ISBN 978-0-19-953343-5.
- International Law – Clarendon Law Series (Oxford University Press, 2007). Pp. xxv and 298. ISBN 978-0-19-923083-9 (hardback).
- The Settlement of International Disputes (with J G Collier) (Oxford University Press, 1999). Pp. xxviii and 395. ISBN 978-0-19-825669-4.
- The International Law Commission and the Future of International Law (ed., and contrib., with M R Anderson, A E Boyle, C Wickremasinghe), (British Institute of International and Comparative Law, London, 1998). Pp. xxi and 239. ISBN 978-0-903067-95-9.
- Fifty Years of the International Court of Justice: Essays in honour of Sir Robert Jennings (ed. with M Fitzmaurice) (Cambridge University Press, 1996) Pp. xxviii + 629 + index. ISBN 978-0-521-55093-2.
- The United Nations and the Principles of International Law: Essays in Memory of Michael Akehurst (ed. with C Warbrick), (Longmans, 1994; reprinted 1996). Pp. 266. ISBN 978-0-415-08441-3.
- The Business of Licensing (with R J Bragg) (Longmans, 1989). Pp. xi and 169. ISBN 978-0-582-01891-4.
- Extraterritorial Jurisdiction: an Annotated Collection of Legal Materials (Grotius Publications Ltd., 1983). Pp. xxi and 272. ISBN 978-0-906496-35-0.

Articles and chapters in various journals and books.
