= Edwards Professor of Medieval History =

The Edwards Professor of Medieval History is a professorship at the University of Glasgow, in Scotland. Initially established in 1955 as the Chair of Medieval History, it was later renamed in 1989 to honor John Edwards, a renowned Glasgow scholar and antiquarian who lived from 1846 to 1937.

== Professors of Medieval History/Edwards Professors of Medieval History ==
- Edward Lionel Gregory Stones MA PhD (1956)
- Alfred Lawson Brown MA DPhil FRHistS (1978)
- David Bates BA PhD (1994)
- Julia Mary Howard Smith (2005–2016)

== See also ==
- List of Professorships at the University of Glasgow
- Professor of Modern History, Glasgow
- Professor of Scottish History and Literature, Glasgow
