= Alfred Lawson Brown =

Alfred Lawson Brown

Alfred Lawson Brown (1927 – 28 August 2006) was titular professor of medieval history at the University of Glasgow from 1973 to 1978. In the latter year he succeeded Lionel Stones as the Edwards Professor of Medieval History. Brown was a specialist in English government of the 14th and 15th centuries. He served as vice-principal of the university from 1985 to 1990.

== Selected publications ==
- Select Documents of English Constitutional History, 1307–1485, A & C Black, London, 1961. (with S. B. Chrimes)
- The Early History of the Clerkship of the Council, University of Glasgow, Glasgow, 1969. ISBN 085261005X
- The Governance of Late Medieval England, 1272–1461, Edward Arnold, London, 1989. ISBN 0713163801 (The Governance of England No. 3)
- The University of Glasgow, 1451–1996, Edinburgh University Press for the University of Glasgow, c. 1996. (With Michael Moss)
