= Chichele Professorship =

Statutory professorships at the University of Oxford, England

The Chichele Professorships are statutory professorships at the University of Oxford named in honour of Henry Chichele (also spelt Chicheley or Checheley, although the spelling of the academic position is consistently "Chichele"), an Archbishop of Canterbury and founder of All Souls College, Oxford. Fellowship of that college has accompanied the award of a Chichele chair since 1870.

Following the work of the 1850 Commission to examine the organization of the university, All Souls College suppressed ten of its fellowships to create the funds to establish the first two Chichele professorships: The Chichele Professor of International Law and Diplomacy, established in 1859 and first held by Mountague Bernard, and the Chichele Professor of Modern History, first held by Montagu Burrows.

The military history chair was originally established in 1909 as the Chichele Professorship of Military History. In 1923, the History Faculty Board first recommended that the name of the chair be changed to the history of war, but this recommendation was not implemented until 1946.

== Professorships ==
There are currently Chichele Professorships in five different subjects:

- Chichele Professor of Economic History, established 1931
- Chichele Professor of the History of War, established 1909
- Chichele Professor of Public International Law, established 1859
- Chichele Professor of Social and Political Theory, established 1944
- Chichele Professor of Medieval History, established 1862 as Modern History; renamed in 1984

== Holders ==
=== Economic history ===
- George Norman Clark, 1931
- W. K. Hancock, 1944
- John Habakkuk, 1950–1967
- Peter Mathias, 1969–1987
- Charles Feinstein, 1989–
- Avner Offer, 2000–2011
- Kevin O'Rourke, 2011–2019
- Sheilagh Ogilvie, 2020–

=== History of war ===
1. Spenser Wilkinson, 1909–1923
2. Sir Ernest Swinton, 1925–1939

The Chair was vacant from 1939 to 1943 and suspended between 1943 and 1946, when it was renamed from of Military History

1. Cyril Falls, 1946–1953
2. N. H. Gibbs, 1953–1977
3. Michael Howard, 1977–1980
4. Robert O'Neill, 1987–2000
5. Sir Hew Strachan, 2001–2015
6. Peter H. Wilson, 2015–present

=== Public international law ===
- Mountague Bernard, 1859–1870
- Thomas Erskine Holland, 1874–
- Sir Henry Erle Richards, 1911–
- James Leslie Brierly, 1922–
- Sir Humphrey Waldock, 1947–
- D. P. O'Connell, 1972–1979
- Ian Brownlie, 1980–1999
- Vaughan Lowe, 1999–2012
- Catherine Redgwell, 2012–2023
- Dapo Akande, 2023–

=== Social and political theory ===
- G. D. H. Cole, 1944–1957
- Sir Isaiah Berlin, 1957–1967
- John Plamenatz, 1967–1975
- Charles Taylor, 1976–1981
- G. A. Cohen, 1985–2008
- Jeremy Waldron, 2010–2014
- Amia Srinivasan, 2020–

=== Modern history ===
- Montagu Burrows, 1862–1905
- Sir Charles Oman, 1905–1946
- Keith Feiling, 1946–1950
- E. F. Jacob, 1950–1961
- R. W. Southern, 1961–1969
- Geoffrey Barraclough, 1970–1973
- J. M. Wallace-Hadrill, 1974–1983

=== Medieval history ===
- Karl Leyser, 1984–1988
- George Arthur Holmes, 1989–1995
- Sir Rees Davies, 1995–2005
- Christopher Wickham, 2005–2016
- Julia M. H. Smith, 2016–2025
- Alice Rio, 2025–

== See also ==
- Chichele Lectures
- List of professorships at the University of Oxford
