= E. L. G. Stones =

Edward Lionel Gregory Stones

Edward Lionel Gregory Stones, FBA (1914–1987) was Edwards Professor of Medieval History at the University of Glasgow from 1956 to 1978.

== Early life and education ==
Stones was born in Croydon. He was educated at the High School of Glasgow and studied English Language and Literature at the University of Glasgow from where he graduated with an MA with first class honours. He studied at Balliol College, University of Oxford where he obtaining a first class honours degree in modern history in 1939. Stones served in the Royal Signals during the Second World War, rising to the rank of Major.

== Career ==
Stones was a lecturer in history at Glasgow University from 1945 to 1956, completed his PhD there in 1950, and became Edwards Professor of Medieval History there in 1956. He retired in 1978 and was succeeded in the Edwards chair by Alfred Lawson Brown. His papers are held at the University of Glasgow Archives.

== Death ==
Stones died in 1987.

== Selected publications ==
- Sir Geoffrey Le Scrope, (c.1285–1340), University of Glasgow, Glasgow, 1950.
- Anglo-Scottish Relations 1174–1328: Some Selected Documents, Nelson, London, 1965.
- Edward I and the throne of Scotland, 1290–1296: An edition of the record sources for the Great Cause, Oxford University Press, Oxford, 1978.
