= Professor of Modern History (Glasgow) =

The Chair of Modern History at the University of Glasgow was founded in 1893 as the Chair of History. In 1956 the title was changed to Modern History to reflect the establishment of the Edwards Chair of Medieval History. It is the second-oldest chair of history in the United Kingdom outside of Oxbridge.

== Professors of History/Professors of Modern History ==
- Sir Richard Lodge MA (1894–1899)
- Dudley Julius Medley MA LLD (1899–1931)
- Andrew Browning MA DLitt FBA (1931–57)
- Esmond Wright MA (1957–67)
- William Ranulf Brock MA PhD FBA (1967–80)
- Keith Gilbert Robbins MA DPhil DLitt FRSE (1981–90)
- Sir Hew Strachan MA PhD DUniv FRSE (1991–2000)
- Bernard Wasserstein MA DPhil DLitt (2000–03)
- Colin Kidd MA DPhil FRSE FBA (2003–10)
- Sönke Neitzel BA MA PhD (2010–12)
- Lynn Abrams BA MA PhD (2013–present)

== See also ==
- List of Professorships at the University of Glasgow
- Edwards Professor of Medieval History, Glasgow
- Professor of Scottish History and Literature, Glasgow
