= Catherine Redgwell =

Catherine Redgwell is Emeritus Chichele Professor of Public International Law and a fellow of All Souls College, Oxford, as well as a Co-Director of the Oxford Geoengineering Programme of the Oxford Martin School. Professor Redgwell previously held positions as Professor of International Law at the Faculty of Laws, University College London, at the University of Oxford (University Lecturer and Reader in Public International Law), the University of Nottingham and the University of Manchester. She has also served on secondment to the Legal Advisers, Foreign and Commonwealth Office.

== Selected publications ==
- (with L. Rajamani), 'Energy Underground: What’s International Law Got To Do With It?' in D. Zillman, A. McHarg, L. Barrera-Hernandez and A. Bradbrook (eds), Energy Underground: Innovative Law and Policy for Transformative Technologies (Oxford University Press, 2014)
- 'The Wrong Trousers: State Responsibility and International Environmental Law', in P. Koutrakos and M Evans (eds), The International Responsibility of the European Union – European and International Perspectives (Hart Publishing, 2013), 257-274
- 'Geoengineering the Climate: Technological Solutions to Mitigation Failure or Continuing Carbon Addiction?', Carbon and Climate Law Review, 17 (2012)178-189
- (with M. Bowman and P. Davies), Lyster's International Wildlife Law (Cambridge University Press, 2nd edition, 2010)
- Birnie, Boyle and Redgwell, International Law & the Environment (Oxford University Press, 3rd edition, 2009)
- 'International Energy Law', in M. Roggenkamp, C. Redgwell, I. del Guayo and A. Ronne (eds), Energy Law in Europe: National EU and International Regulation (Oxford University Press, 2nd edn, 2007; 3rd edn, forthcoming 2014)

== Professional Memberships and Roles ==
- Joint Editor, British Year Book of International Law
- Co-Editor, Oxford Monographs in International Law
- Member, International Bar Association Presidential Task Force on Climate Change Justice and Human Rights
- Member, Academic Advisory Group, Section on Energy, Environment, Infrastructure and Natural Resources Law of the International Bar Association
- Council Member, British Branch of the International Law Association
- Member, Public International Law Advisory Committee, British Institute of International and Comparative Law
- Member, EuTrace Project Advisory Board, European Trans-disciplinary Assessment of Climate Engineering
- Co-Director, Oxford Geoengineering Programme, Oxford Martin School
