= All Souls College, Oxford =

College of the University of Oxford

All Souls College
- University of Oxford
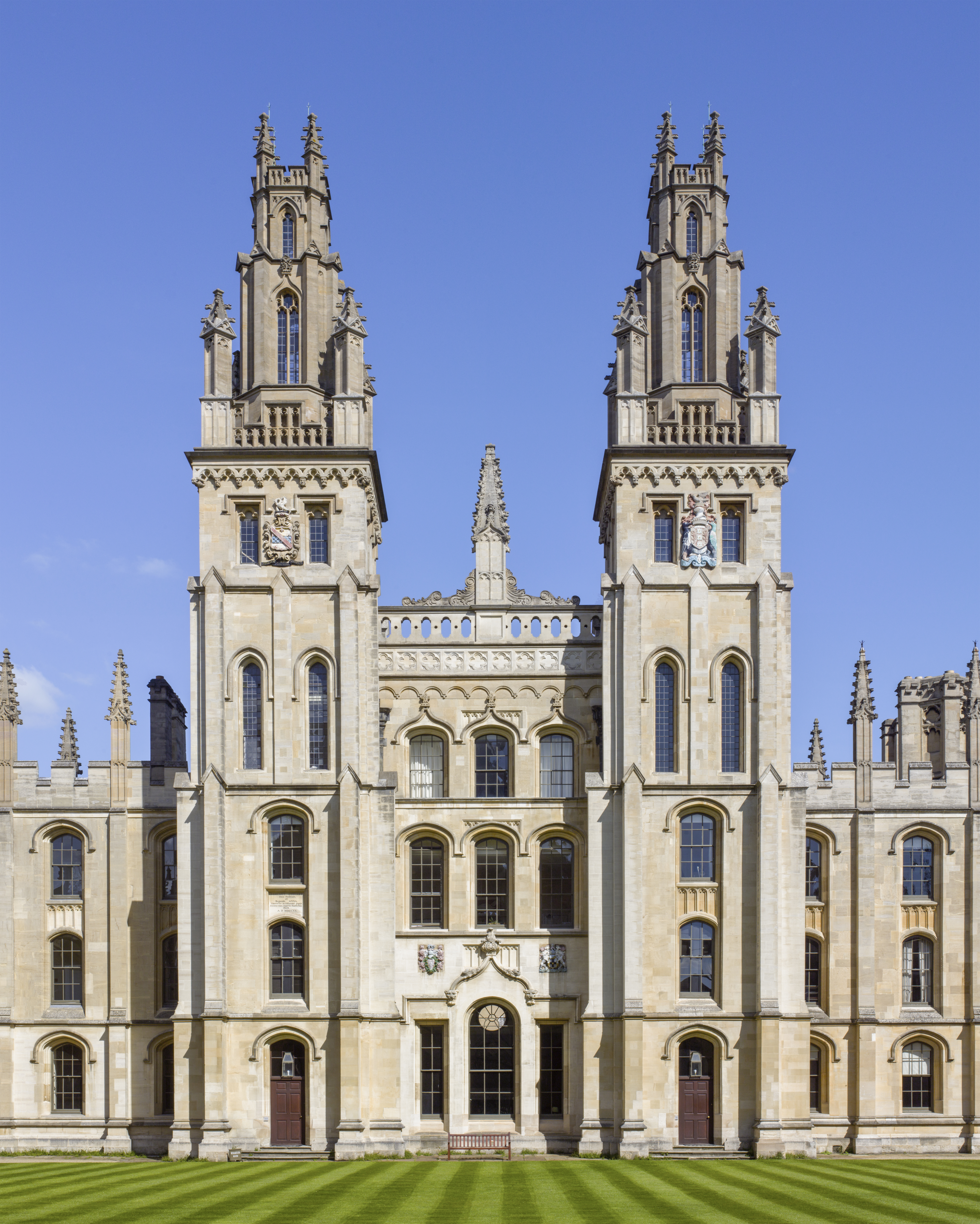

- Arms: Or, a chevron between three cinquefoils gules (arms of Henry Chichele)
- Location: High Street, Oxford OX1 4AL
- Coordinates: 51°45′12″N 1°15′10″W
- Full name: College of All Souls of the Faithful Departed
- Latin name: Collegium Omnium Animarum, Collegium Omnium Animarum Fidelium Defunctorum de Oxonia
- Established: 1438; 588 years ago
- Named after: Feast of All Souls
- Sister college: Trinity Hall, Cambridge
- Warden: Sir John Vickers
- Undergraduates: None
- Postgraduates: Fewer than 6^{data limitation (2023)}
- Endowment: £486.7 million (2023)
- Visitor: Sarah Mullally (as Archbishop of Canterbury ex officio)
- Website: www.asc.ox.ac.uk

Map
- Location within Oxford city centre

All Souls College (official name: The College of All Souls of the Faithful Departed, of Oxford) is a constituent college of the University of Oxford in England. Unique to All Souls, all of its members automatically become fellows (i.e., full members of the college's governing body). It has no student members, but each year, recent graduates are eligible to apply for a small number of examination fellowships through a competitive examination (once described as "the hardest exam in the world") and, for those shortlisted after the examinations, an interview.

The college entrance is on the north side of High Street, whilst it has a long frontage onto Radcliffe Square. To its east is The Queen's College, whilst Hertford College is to the north of All Souls.

The current warden (head of the college) is Sir John Vickers, a graduate of Oriel College, Oxford.

== History ==
The college was founded by Henry VI of England and Henry Chichele (fellow of New College and Archbishop of Canterbury), in 1438, to commemorate the victims of the Hundred Years' War. The Statutes provided for a warden and 40 fellows; all to take Holy Orders: 24 to study arts and theology; and 16 to study civil or canon law.

Today the college is primarily a research institution, with no student members. All Souls did formerly have students: Robert Hovenden (Warden of the college from 1571 to 1614) introduced undergraduates to provide the fellows with servientes (household servants), but this was abandoned by the end of the Commonwealth. Four Bible Clerks remained on the foundation until 1924.

For over five hundred years All Souls College admitted only men; women were first allowed to join the college as fellows in 1979, the same year as many other previously all-male colleges in the university. The American philosopher Susan Hurley became the first female fellow in 1981. Conservative fellows opposed this change. Once, upon encountering a woman fellow, the geneticist E. B. Ford swung his umbrella at her and shouted "Out of my way, henbird!".

== Buildings and architecture ==
=== All Souls College Library ===
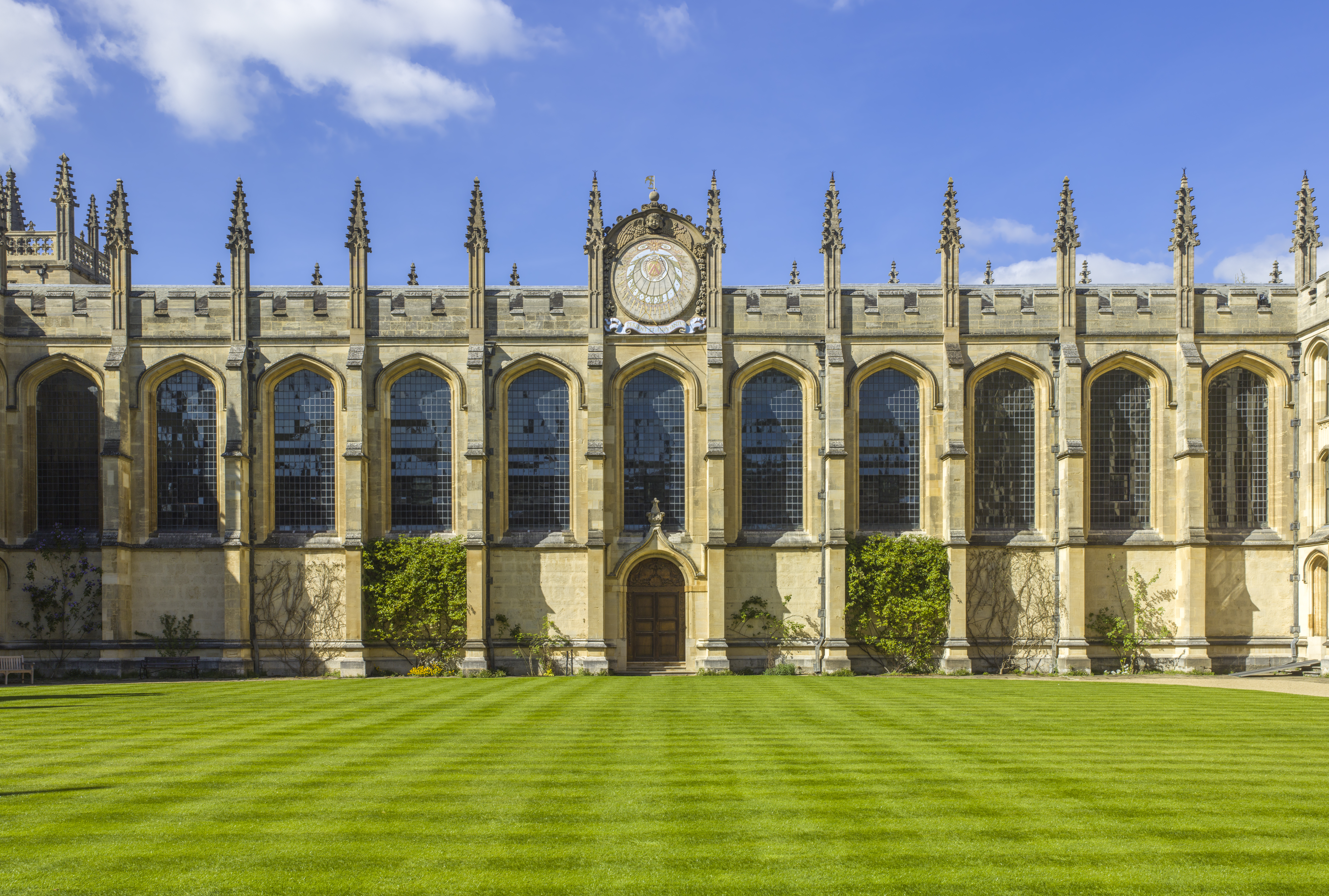
All Souls College Library, showing Wren's sundial over the central door

The All Souls College Library (formerly known as the Codrington Library) was founded through a 1710 bequest from Christopher Codrington (1668–1710), a fellow of the college and a wealthy slave and sugar plantation owner. Codrington was an undergraduate at Oxford and later became colonial governor of the Leeward Islands. Christopher Codrington was born in Barbados, and amassed a fortune from his sugar plantation in the West Indies.

Under the terms of his will Codrington bequeathed books worth £6,000 to the college in addition to £10,000 in currency for the library to be rebuilt and endowed. The new library was completed in 1751 to the designs of Nicholas Hawksmoor and has been in continuous use since then. Today the library comprises some 185,000 items, about a third of which were published before 1800. The collections are particularly strong in law and history (especially military history).

Sir Christopher Wren was a fellow from 1653. The design of the sundial, produced in 1658 for the south wall of the Chapel, is attributed to Wren. The sundial was moved to the quadrangle (above the central entrance to the Library) in 1877.

In 2020, the College decided to cease referring to the Library as 'The Codrington Library' as part of a set of "steps to address the problematic nature of the Codrington legacy", which comes from wealth derived from slave plantations.

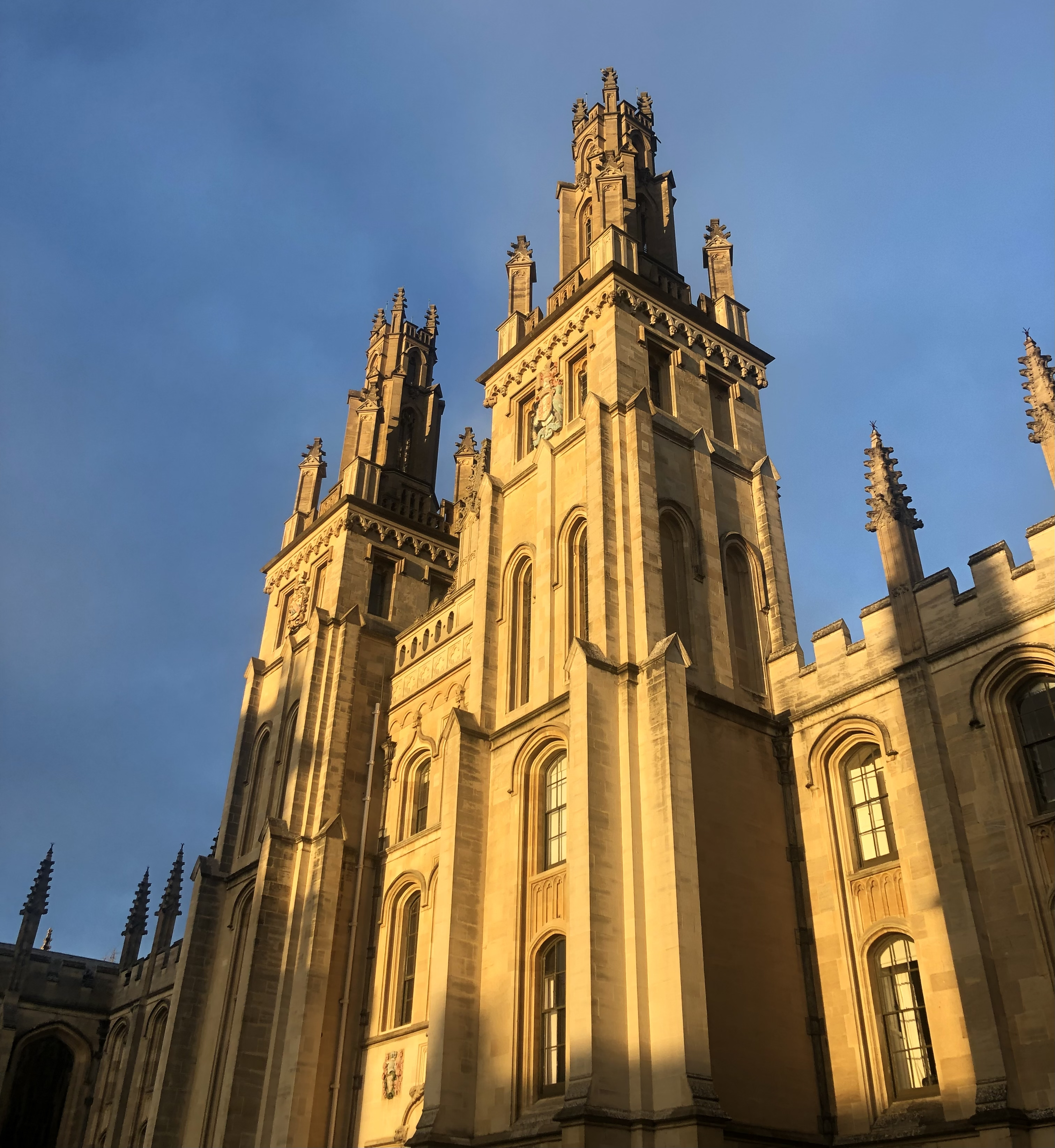
The double towers of All Souls College, Oxford

=== Chapel ===
Built between 1438 and 1442, the college chapel remained largely unchanged until the Commonwealth. Oxford, having been a largely Royalist stronghold, suffered under the Puritans' wrath. The 42 misericords date from the Chapel's building, and show a resemblance to the misericords at St Mary's Church, Higham Ferrers. Both may have been carved by Richard Tyllock. During the 1660s a screen was installed in the Chapel, which was based on a design by Wren. However, this screen needed to be rebuilt by 1713. By the mid-19th century the Chapel was in great need of renovation, and so the current structure is heavily influenced by Victorian design ideals. There have been a number of rearrangements and repairs of the stained glass windows, but much of the original medieval glass survives.

All services at the chapel are according to the Book of Common Prayer; the King James Bible is also used rather than more modern translations.

== Wealth ==
All Souls is one of the wealthiest colleges in Oxford with a financial endowment of £486.7 million (2023). Approximately 95% of its annual income is derived from its endowment as the College does not receive any income from tuition fees. It is a registered charity.

== Fellowships ==
=== Examination fellowships ===
Usually within the three years following the award of their bachelor's or master's degrees, students graduating from Oxford and current Oxford postgraduate students having graduated elsewhere are eligible to apply for examination fellowships (sometimes informally referred to as "prize fellowships") of seven years each. While tutors may advise their students to sit for the All Souls examination fellowship, the examination is open to anybody who fulfils the eligibility criteria and the college does not issue invitations to candidates to sit. Every year in early March, the college hosts an open evening for women, offering women interested in the examination fellowship an opportunity to find out more about the exam process and to meet members of the college.

Each year several dozen candidates typically sit the examination. Two examination fellows are usually elected each year, although the college has awarded a single place or three places in some years, and on rare occasions made no award.

The competition, offered since 1878 and open to women since 1979, is held over two days in late September, with two papers of three hours each per day. It has been described as "the hardest exam in the world".

Two papers (the 'specialist papers') are on a single subject of the candidate's choice; the options are classics, English literature, economics, history, law, philosophy, and politics.

Two papers (the 'general papers') are on general subjects. For each general examination, candidates choose three questions from a list. Past questions have included:

- "'If a man could say nothing against a character but what he could prove, history could not be written' (Samuel Johnson). Discuss."
- "Should the Orange Prize for Fiction be open to both men and women?"
- "Does the moral character of an orgy change when the participants wear Nazi uniforms?"

Before 2010 candidates also faced another examination, a free-form "Essay" on a single, pre-selected word.

Four to six finalists are invited to a viva voce or oral examination. Previously, these candidates were then invited to dinner with about 75 members of the college. The dinner did not form part of the assessment, but was intended as a reward for those candidates who had reached the latter stages of the selection process. However, the dinner has been discontinued as the college felt candidates worried too often that it was part of the assessment process.

About a dozen examination fellows are at the college at any one time. There are no compulsory teaching or requirements, although examination fellows must pursue a course of study or research at some point within their first two years of fellowship. They can study anything for nothing at Oxford with room and board. As "Londoners" they can pursue approved non-academic careers if desired, with a reduced stipend, as long as they pursue academia on a part-time basis and attend weekend dinners at the college during their first academic year. As of 2011 each examination fellow receives a stipend of £14,842 annually for the first two years; the stipend then varies depending on whether the fellow pursues an academic career.

==== Notable candidates ====
Until 1979, women were not permitted to put themselves forward for fellowships at All Souls.

===== Successful =====
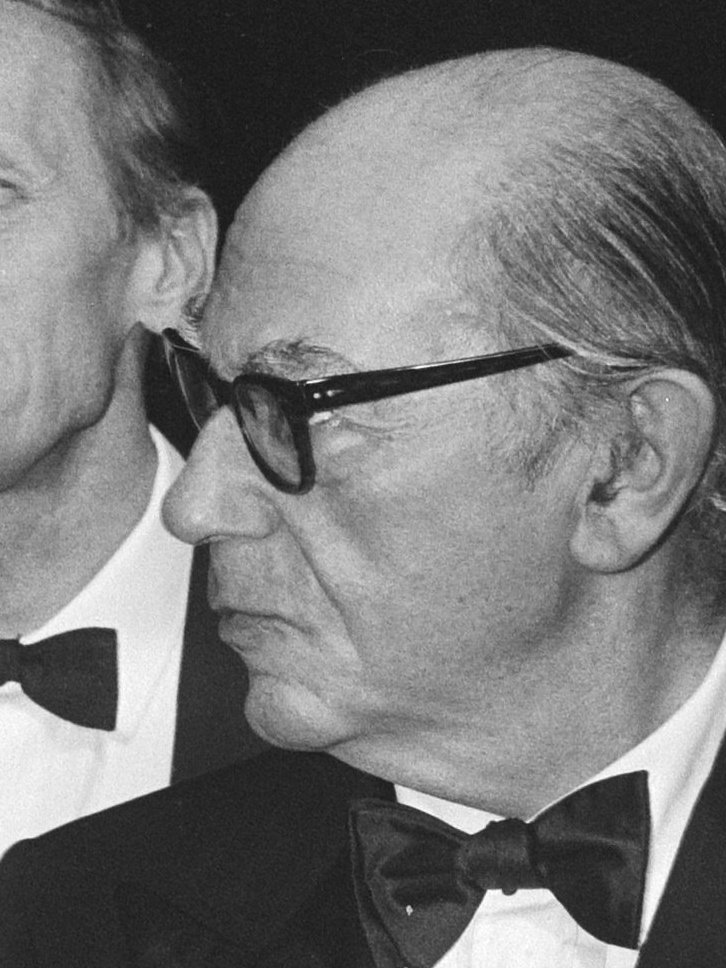
Isaiah Berlin – philosopher

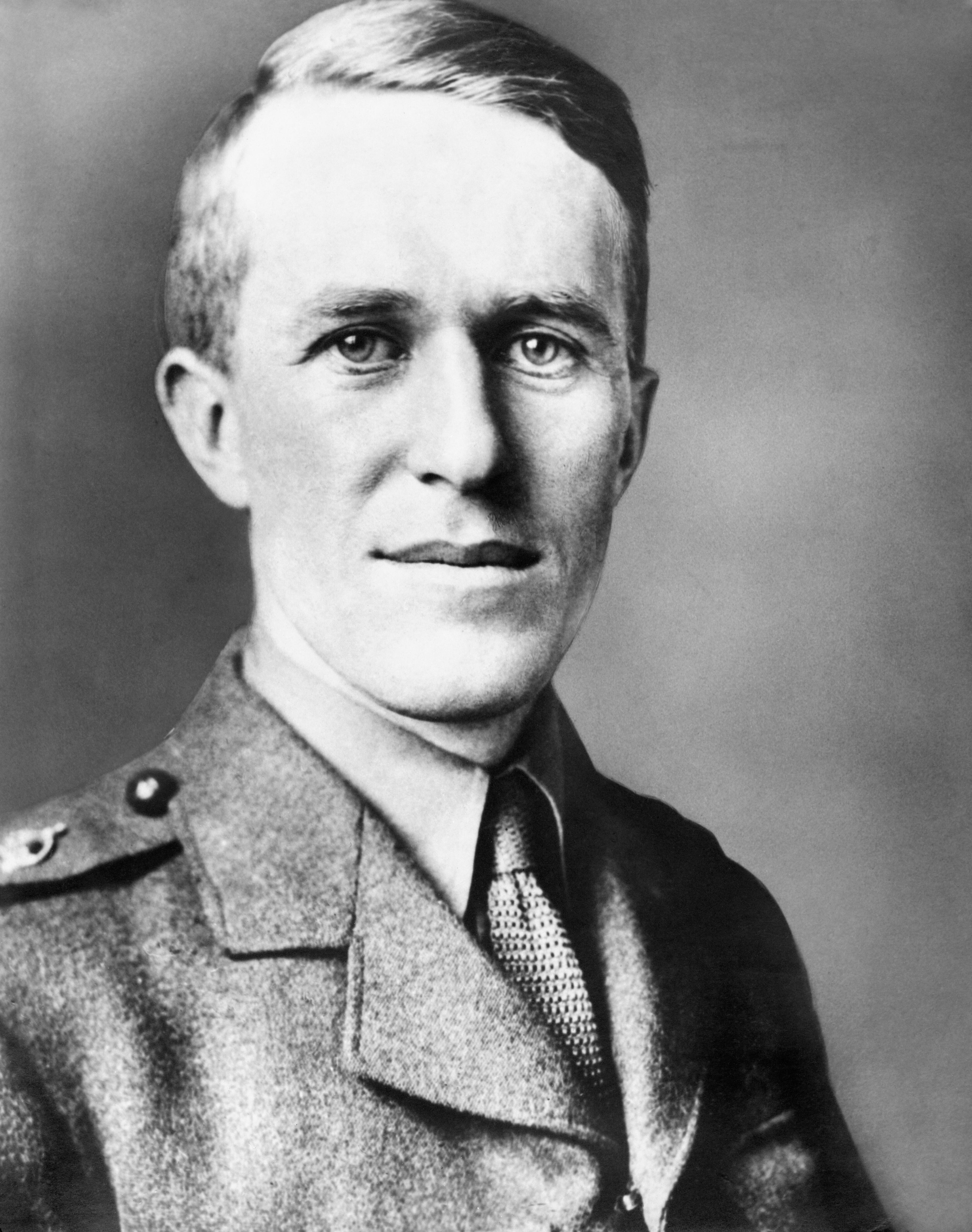
T. E. Lawrence – "Lawrence of Arabia"

- Leo Amery (1897), politician
- J. L. Austin (1933), philosopher
- Sir Isaiah Berlin (1932), philosopher
- George Earle Buckle (1877), journalist
- George Curzon, 1st Marquess Curzon of Kedleston (1883), Viceroy of India
- Geoffrey Dawson (1898), journalist
- Matthew d'Ancona (1989), journalist
- John Gardner (1986), legal philosopher
- Birke Häcker (2001), legal scholar
- Quintin Hogg, Baron Hailsham of St Marylebone (1931), politician and philosopher
- Douglas Jay, Baron Jay (1930), politician
- Richard Jenkyns (1972), classical historian and literary critic
- Keith Joseph, Baron Joseph (1946), politician
- T. E. Lawrence (1919), "Lawrence of Arabia", military officer, writer
- M. N. Srinivas, Social anthropologist
- Sir Jeremy Morse, banker
- Edward Mortimer (1965) journalist, author, international public servant
- Marius Ostrowski (2013), political theorist
- David Pannick, Baron Pannick (1978), barrister
- Derek Parfit (1974), philosopher
- Sir John Redwood (1972), politician
- A. L. Rowse (1925), historian and poet
- Katherine Rundell (2008), author
- Andrew J Scott CBE (1994), economist
- Amia Srinivasan (2009), philosopher
- John Simon, 1st Viscount Simon (1897), politician
- William Waldegrave, Baron Waldegrave of North Hill (1971), politician
- Richard Wilberforce, Baron Wilberforce (1932), jurist
- Sir Bernard Williams (1951), philosopher
- Crispin Wright (1969), philosopher
- Sir John Vickers (1979), economist

===== Unsuccessful =====
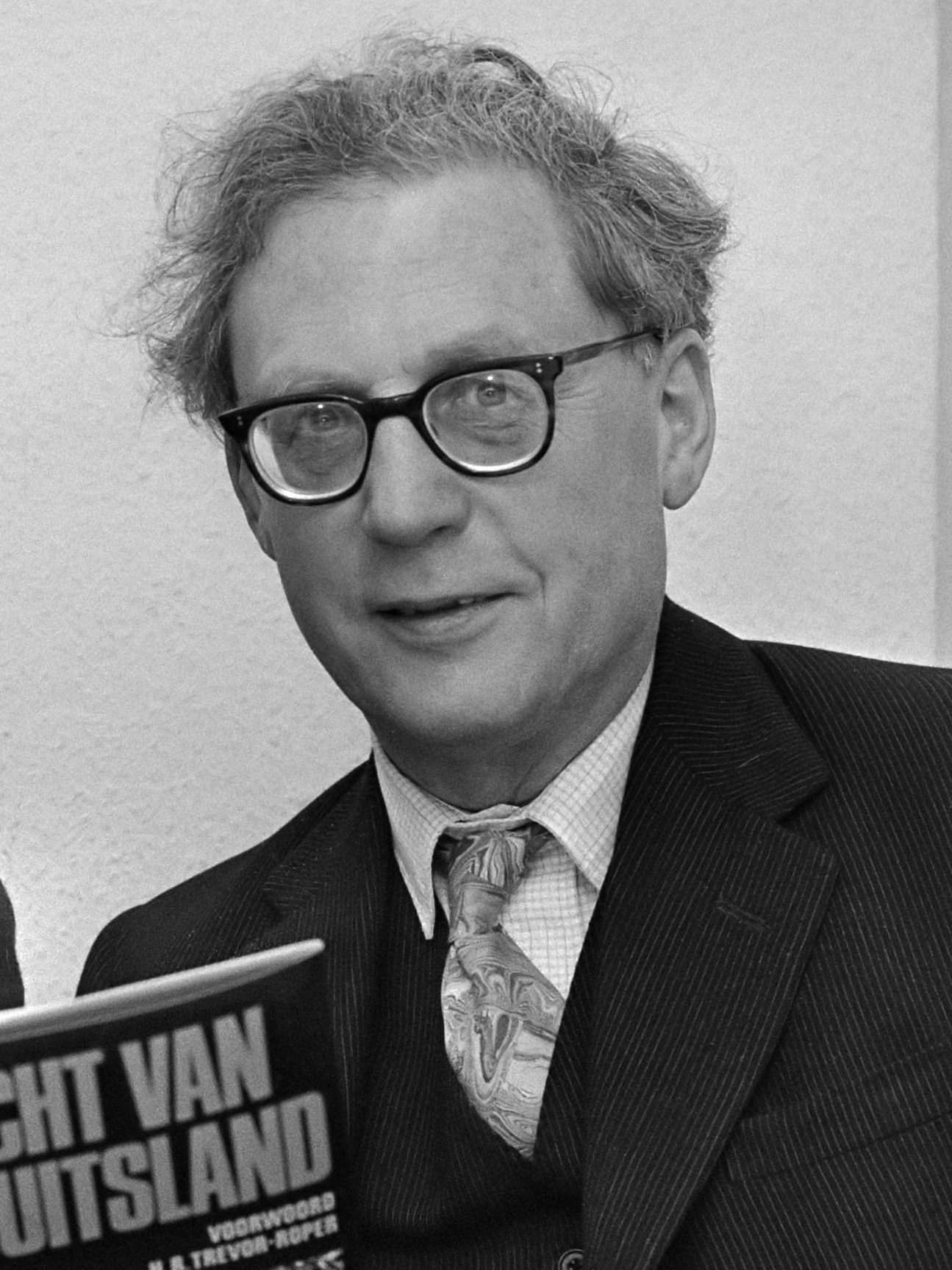
Hugh Trevor-Roper – historian

- Hilaire Belloc (1895), author
- John Buchan, 1st Baron Tweedsmuir (1899), author and Governor General of Canada
- Lord David Cecil, author
- H. L. A. Hart (1929, 1930), philosopher
- Sir William Holdsworth (1897), legal historian
- Cosmo Gordon Lang, 1st Baron Lang of Lambeth (1888), Archbishop of Canterbury
- Harry Mount (1994), journalist
- Ramsay Muir (1897), politician
- Tom Denning, Baron Denning (1923), jurist
- Hugh Trevor-Roper, Baron Dacre of Glanton, historian
- Eric Williams, historian and politician
- Harold Wilson, Baron Wilson of Rievaulx, Prime Minister of the United Kingdom
- Tom Bingham, Baron Bingham of Cornhill, jurist

==== Subjects of the "Essay" ====
This is a complete list of the one-word "Essay" subjects:

Year	Essay subject
1914	"Culture"
1919	"Caricature", "Command of the Sea", "Nationality, "Secret Diplomacy", "Realism", "The Function of a University", "Style"
1920	"Progress", "Nationalism", "Propaganda", "Imitation", "Eugenics"
1921	"Pain", "Virtue by Act of Parliament", "Casuistry", "Public Opinion"
1922	"Criteria of value"
1923	"Authority"
1924	"Liberty—Equality—Fraternity, three beautiful but incompatible ideals"
1925	"Possessions"
1926	"Revolution"
1927	"Security"
1928	"Time"
1929	"Authority"
1930	"Propaganda"
1931	"The Middle Class"
1932	"Originality"
1933	"Patriotism"
1934	"Law and Order"
1935	"Genius"
1936	"Pedantry"
1937	"Toleration"
1938	"Compromise"
1946	"Humanism", "Civil liberties", "Leisure"
1947	"Vulgarity"
1948	"Style"
1949	"Originality"
1950	"Property"
1951	"Death", "Conventions", "Colour"
1952	"Oxford"
1953	"Happiness"
1954	"Conformity"
1955	"Sin"
1956	"Islands"
1957	"Loyalty"
1958	"Privacy"
1959	"Success"
1960	"Youth"
1961	"Prejudice"
1962	"Ambition"
1963	"Satire"
1964	"Innocence"
1965	"Charity"
1966	"Civilisation"
1967	"Space"
1968	"Myth"
1969	"Decadence"
1970	"Age"
1971	"Play"
1972	"Guilt"
1973	"Purity"
1974	"Competition"
1975	"Evil"
1976	"Hypocrisy"
1977	"Superstition"
1978	"Discrimination"
1979	"Conversion"
1980	"Extravagance"
1981	"Honour"
1982	"Imagination"
1983	"Taste"
1984	"Self-deception"
1985	"Discretion"
1986	"Race", "Comedy"
1987	"Race"
1988	"Representation"
1989	"Corruption"
1990	"Memory"
1991	"Conformity"
1992	"Illusion"
1993	"Error"
1994	"Miracles"
1995	"Immortality"
1996	"Common sense"
1997	"Corruption"
1998	"Envy"
1999	"Vengeance"
2000	"Disorder"
2001	"Diversity"
2002	"Value"
2003	"Bias"
2004	"Integrity"
2005	"Style"
2006	"Water"
2007	"Harmony"
2008	"Novelty"
2009	"Reproduction"

=== Other fellowships ===
Other categories of fellowship include:

- Senior research fellows (a renewable seven-year appointment)
- Extraordinary research fellows (elected to conduct research into the college's history)
- Visiting fellows (academics from other universities, usually elected for a period of one term to one year)
- Post-doctoral research fellows (a non-renewable five-year post open to those who have recently completed doctoral study at a recognised university)
- Fifty-pound fellows (open only to former fellows no longer holding posts in Oxford)
- Official fellows (consisting of holders of college posts, such as the Domestic Bursar, Estates Bursar, Chaplain, and Fellow Librarian)
- Distinguished fellows

There are also a number of professorial fellows who hold their fellowships by virtue of their University post.

=== Chichele professorships ===
Fellows of the college include the Chichele professors, who hold statutory professorships at the University of Oxford named in honour of Henry Chichele, a founder of the college. Fellowship of the college has accompanied the award of a Chichele chair since 1870.

Following the work of the 1850 Commission to examine the organisation of the university, the college suppressed ten of its fellowships to create the funds to establish the first two Chichele professorships: The Chichele Professor of International Law and Diplomacy, established in 1859 and first held by Mountague Bernard, and the Chichele Professor of Modern History, first held by Montagu Burrows.

There are currently Chichele Professorships in five different subjects:

- Chichele Professor of Economic History: Kevin O'Rourke;
- Chichele Professor of the History of War: Peter H. Wilson appointed 2015;
- Chichele Professor of Public International Law: Dapo Akande appointed 2023;
- Chichele Professor of Social and Political Theory: Amia Srinivasan appointed 2019; and
- Chichele Professor of Medieval History: Julia M. H. Smith, appointed September 2016.

=== Chichele Lectures ===
The Chichele Lectures are a prestigious series of lectures formally established in 1912 and sponsored by All Souls College. The lectures were initially restricted to foreign history, but have since been expanded to include law, political theory, economic theory, as well as foreign and British history. Traditionally the lectures were delivered by a single speaker, but it is now common for several speakers to deliver lectures on a common theme.

== Coat of arms ==
The college's coat of arms was entered at the Visitation of 1574 for The College of the Souls of Faithfull People Deceased with the following blazoning:

Coat of arms of The College of the Souls of Faithfull People Deceased
Escutcheon Or, a chevron between three cinquefoils gules.

== Customs ==
Every hundred years, and generally on 14 January, there is a commemorative feast after which the fellows parade around the college with flaming torches, singing the Mallard Song and led by a "Lord Mallard" who is carried in a chair, in search of a legendary mallard that supposedly flew out of the foundations of the college when it was being built. During the hunt the Lord Mallard is preceded by a man bearing a pole to which a mallard is tied – originally a live bird, latterly either dead (1901) or carved from wood (2001). The last mallard ceremony was in 2001 and the next is due in 2101. The precise origin of the custom is not known, but it dates from at least 1632. A benign parody of this custom has been portrayed as the Unseen University's "Megapode chase" in Sir Terry Pratchett's 2009 novel Unseen Academicals.

== People associated with All Souls ==
=== Fellows ===
Past and current fellows of the college have included:

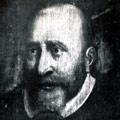
Robert Recorde – inventor of the Western "equals sign" (=).

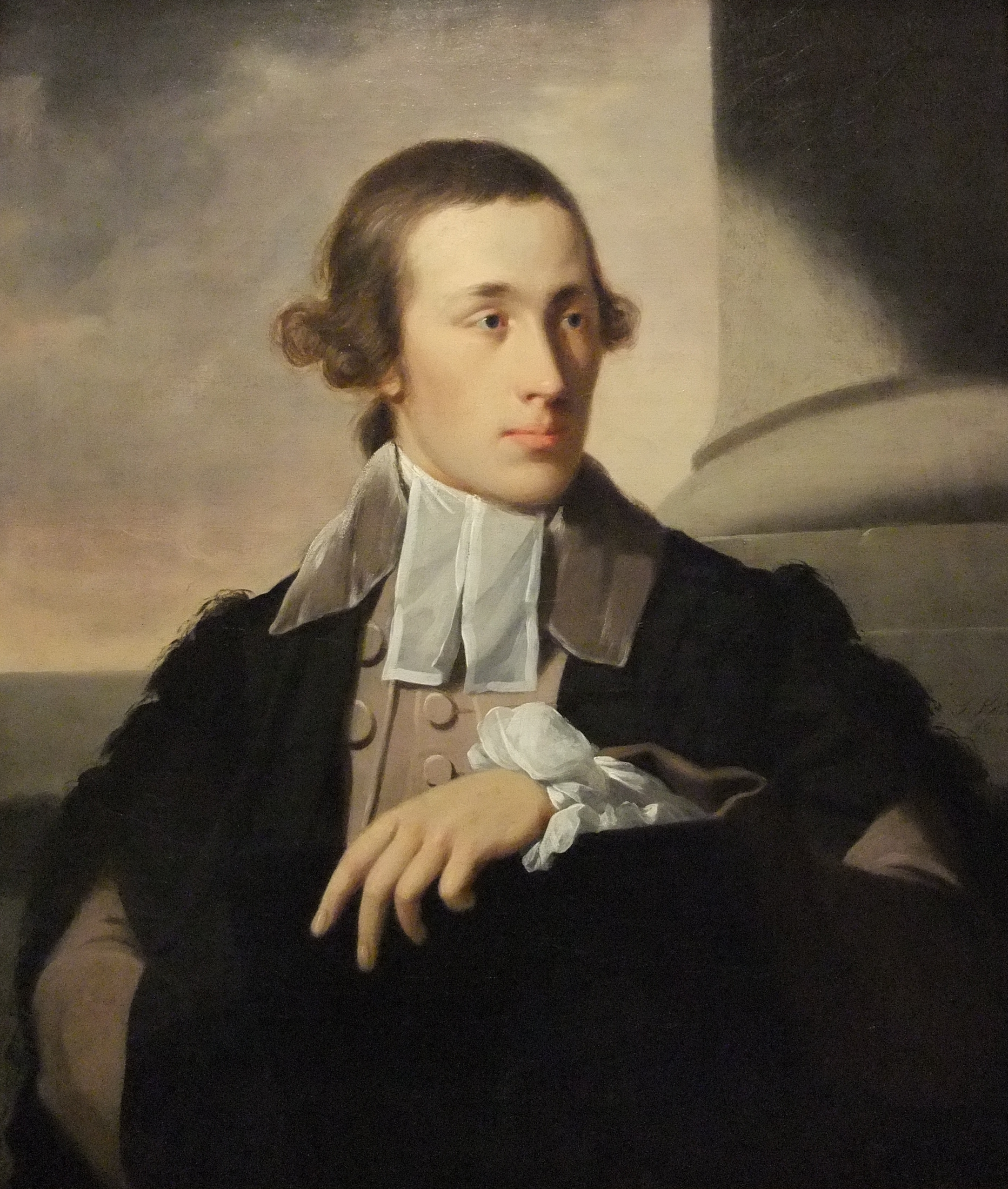
Brownlow North – Bishop of Lichfield in 1771, Bishop of Worcester in 1774, and Bishop of Winchester in 1781. Portrait by Tilly Kettle.

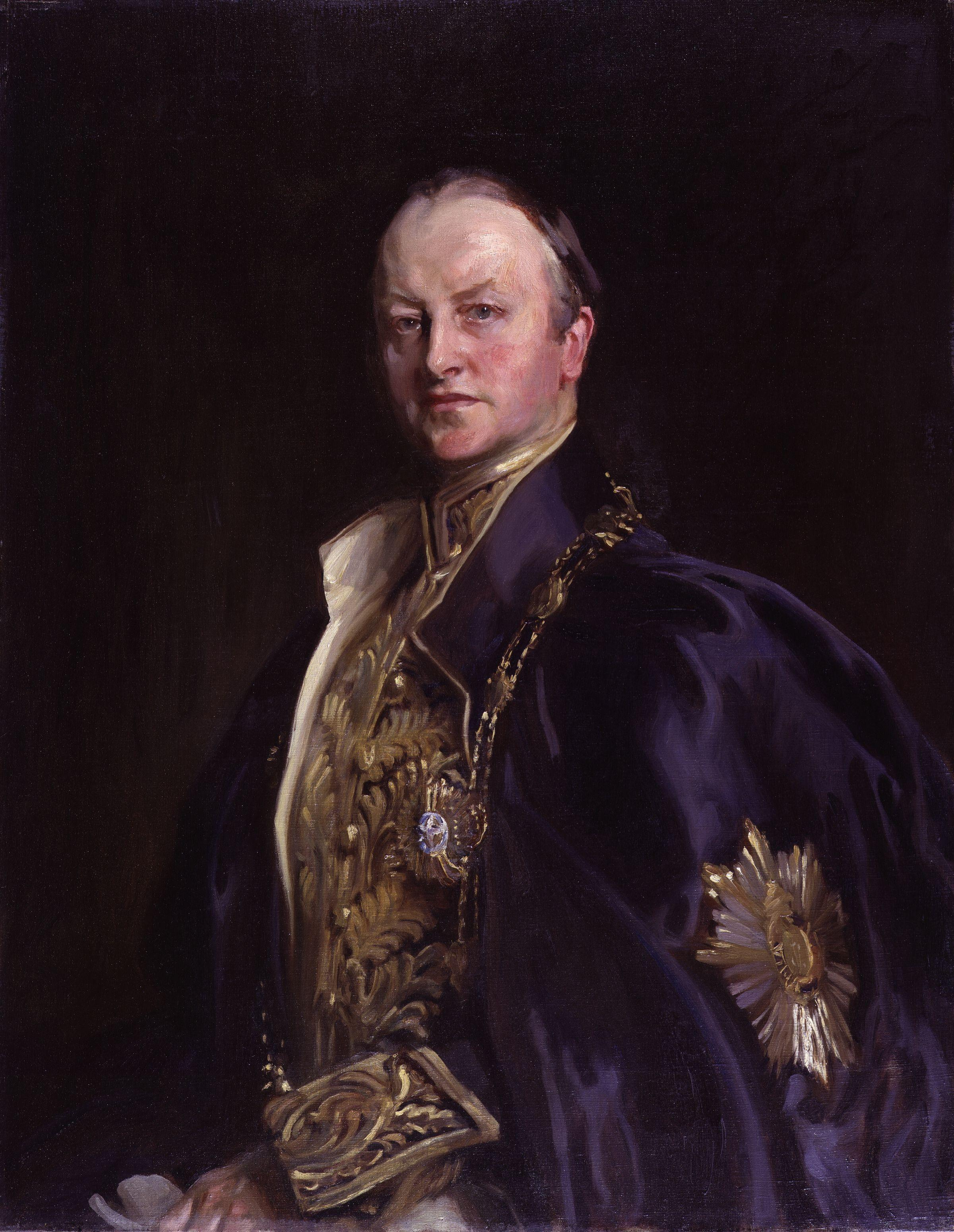
George Nathaniel Curzon by John Cooke – British Conservative statesman who was Viceroy of India and Foreign Secretary. Portrait after John Singer Sargent.

- William Emmanuel Abraham
- Diwakar Acharya
- Leo Amery
- William Reynell Anson
- Andrew Ashworth
- F. W. Bain
- Max Beloff
- Isaiah Berlin
- Margaret Bent
- Tim Besley
- Peter Birks
- Susanne Bobzien
- William Blackstone
- Malcolm Bowie
- Peter Brown
- Julian Bullard
- Myles Burnyeat
- Lionel Butler
- Raymond Carr
- David Caute
- Alasdair Clayre
- Christopher Codrington
- Gerald Cohen
- Peter Conrad
- Vincent Crawford
- George Nathaniel Curzon
- Matthew d'Ancona
- David Daube
- David Dilks
- Michael Dummett
- Edward Evan Evans-Pritchard
- Cécile Fabre
- Sheppard Frere
- Diego Gambetta
- John Gardner
- Robert Gascoyne-Cecil, 3rd Marquess of Salisbury
- Robert Gentilis
- Gabriel Gorodetsky
- Birke Häcker
- Ruth Harris
- Andrew Harvey
- Reginald Heber
- Hensley Henson
- Cecilia Heyes
- Rosemary Hill
- Quintin Hogg, Baron Hailsham of St Marylebone
- Christopher Hood
- John Hood
- Roger Hood
- Michael Howard
- Susan Hurley
- E. F. Jacob
- Keith Joseph
- Colin Kidd
- Leszek Kołakowski
- Cosmo Gordon Lang
- T. E. Lawrence
- Edward Chandos Leigh
- Thomas Linacre
- Vaughan Lowe
- Stephen Lushington
- Robert Gwyn Macfarlane
- James Rochfort Maguire
- Noel Malcolm
- John Mason
- Angela McLean
- Catherine Morgan
- Edward Mortimer
- Max Müller
- Patrick Neill, Baron Neill of Bladen
- Brownlow North
- Avner Offer
- Marius Ostrowski
- David Pannick
- Derek Parfit
- Anthony Quinton
- Sarvepalli Radhakrishnan
- Robert Recorde
- Catherine Redgwell
- John Redwood
- A. L. Rowse
- Katherine Rundell
- Peter Salway
- Andrew Scott
- Graeme Segal
- Amartya Sen
- Catriona Seth
- Alpa Shah
- Patrick Shaw-Stewart
- Gilbert Sheldon
- John Simon, 1st Viscount Simon
- Boudewijn Sirks
- Margareta Steinby
- Alfred C. Stepan
- Joseph E. Stiglitz
- Charles Taylor
- Adam Thirlwell
- Guenter Treitel
- Cecilia Trifogli
- John Vickers
- William Waldegrave, Baron Waldegrave of North Hill
- Kate Warner
- Marina Warner
- Martin Litchfield West
- Charles Algernon Whitmore
- Richard Wilberforce
- Bernard Williams
- E. F. L. Wood, 1st Earl of Halifax
- Llewellyn Woodward
- Patrick Wormald
- Christopher Wren
- Crispin Wright
- Edward Young
- R. C. Zaehner
- Lucia Zedner

=== In fiction ===
In the 2011 historical fantasy novel A Discovery of Witches by Deborah Harkness, main character and vampire Matthew Clairmont is a Fellow of All Souls College, having passed the examination in 1989 after writing an essay on the topic of "desire".

== Gallery ==
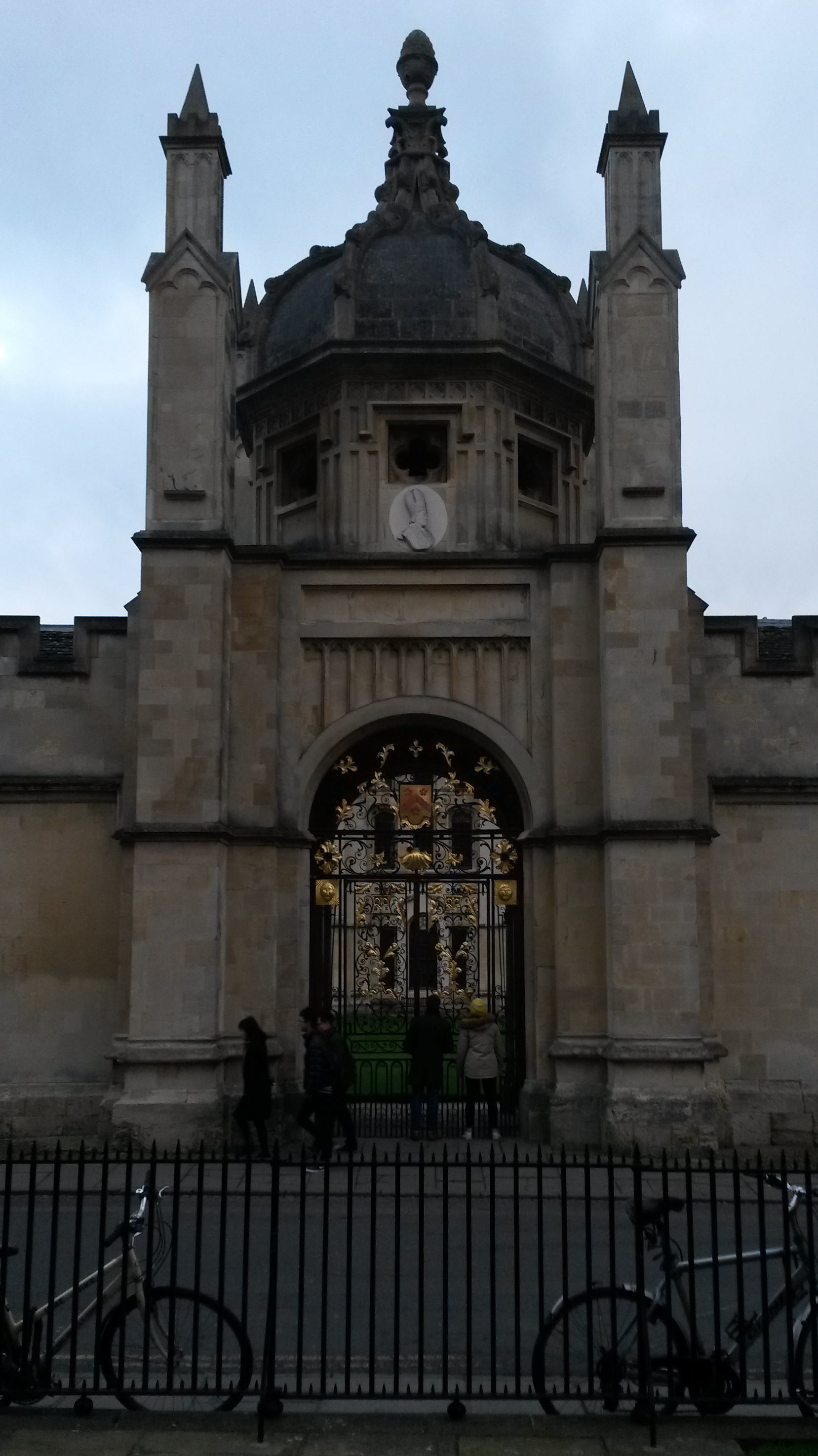
The gates on Radcliffe Square

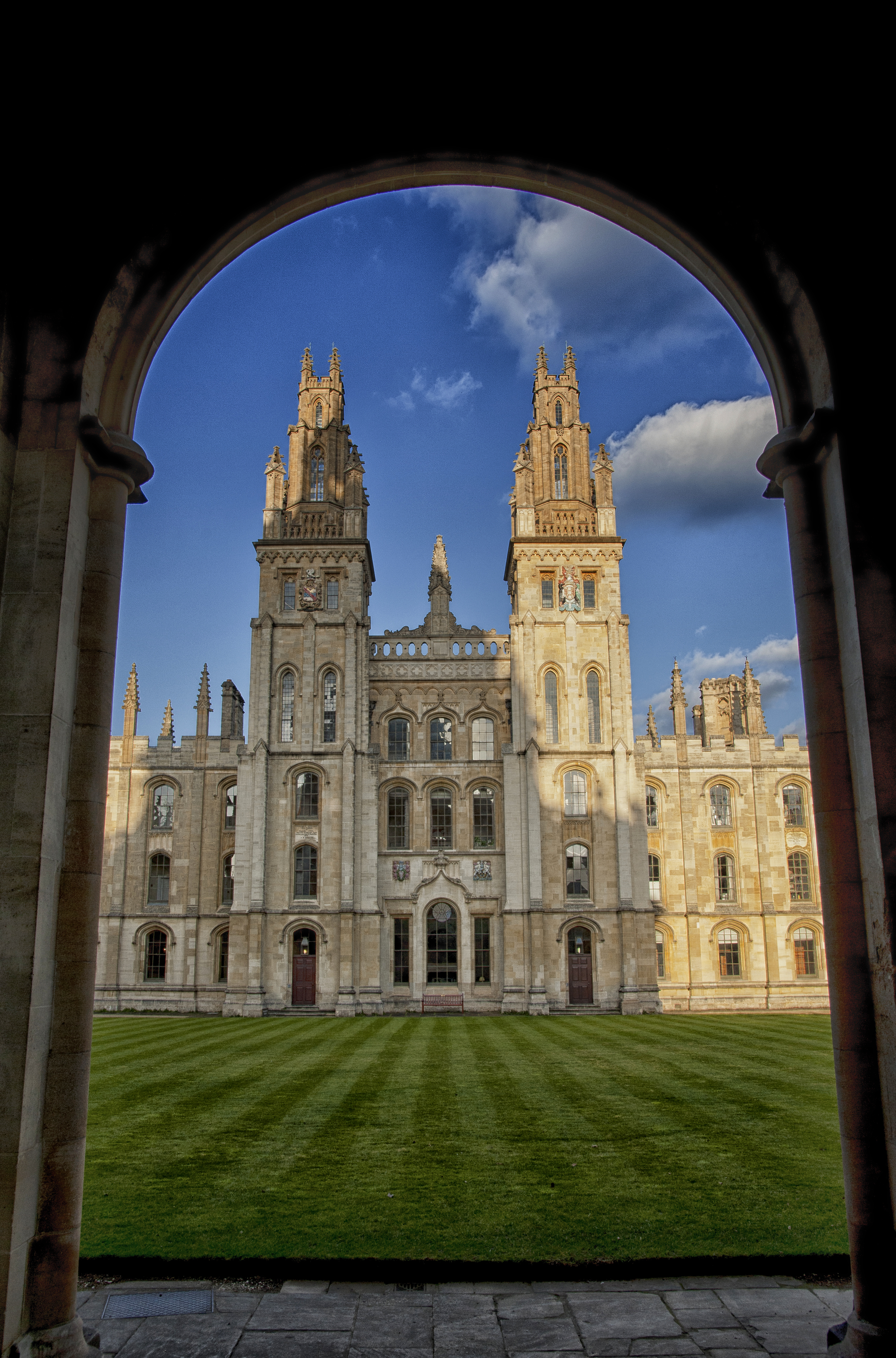
A view of All Souls from the Radcliffe Square gate, showing Nicholas Hawksmoor's 'gothicised classical' elevation

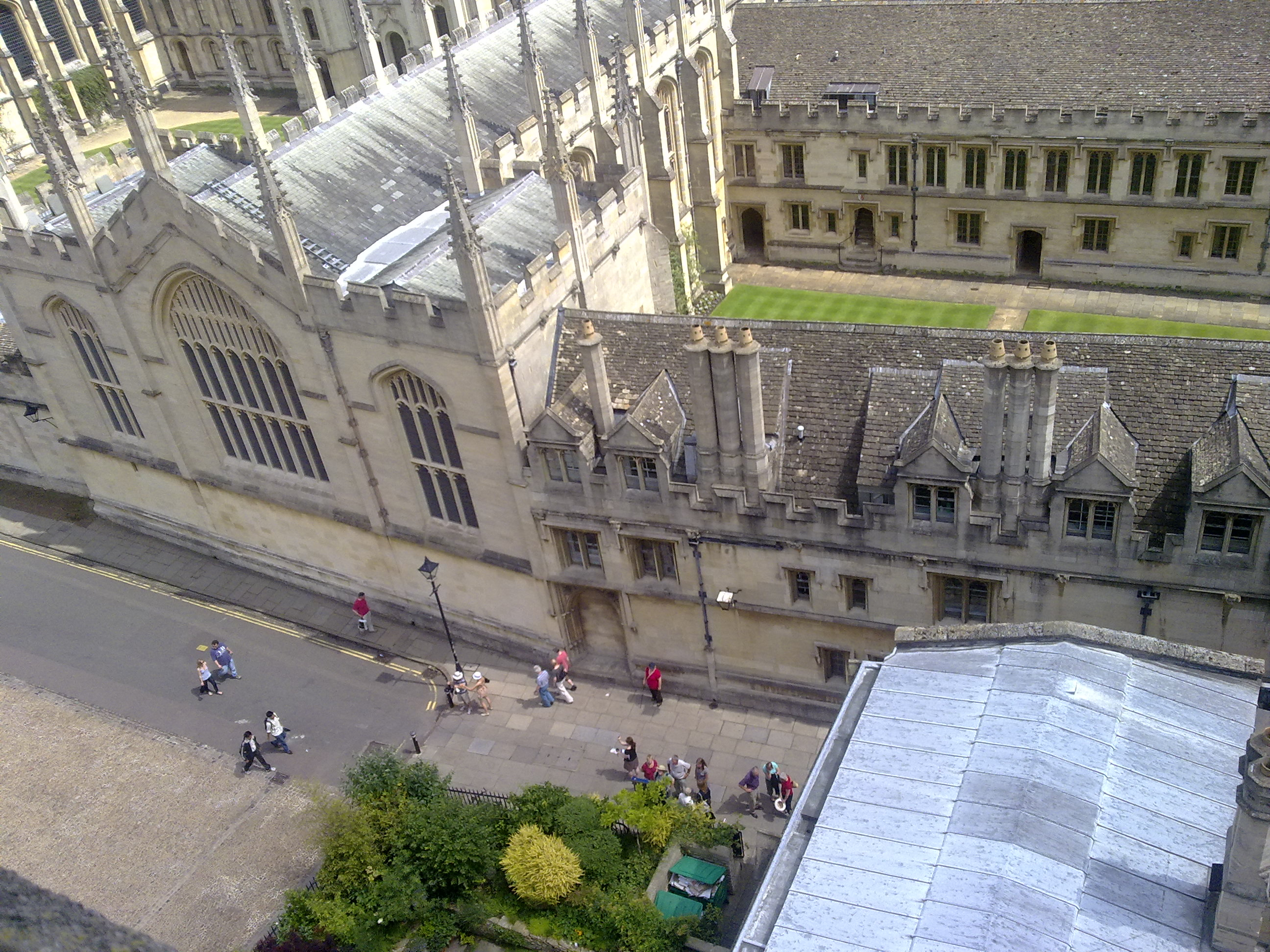
The western edge of All Souls College, abutting Radcliffe Square

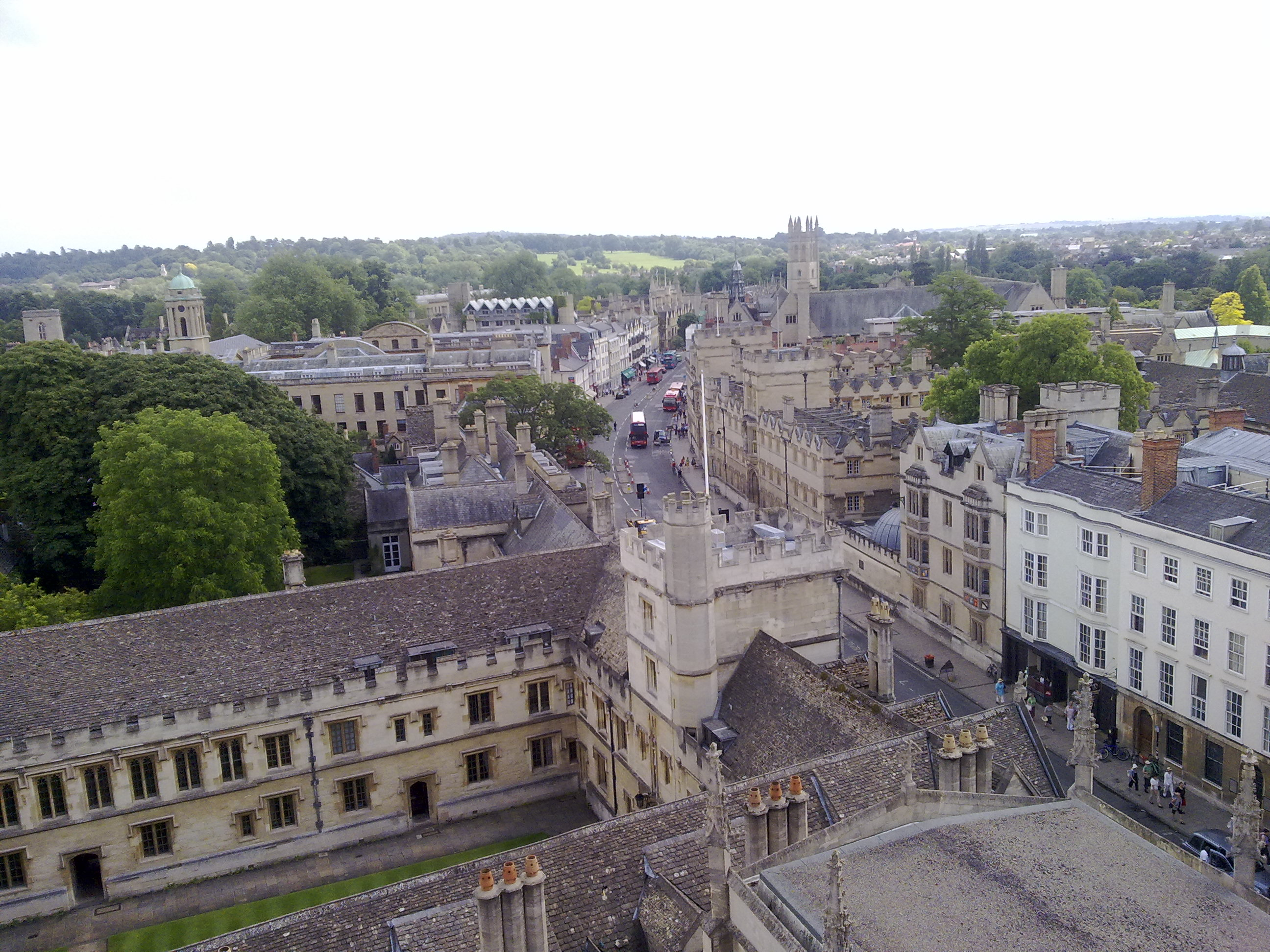
All Souls Quad abutting High Street

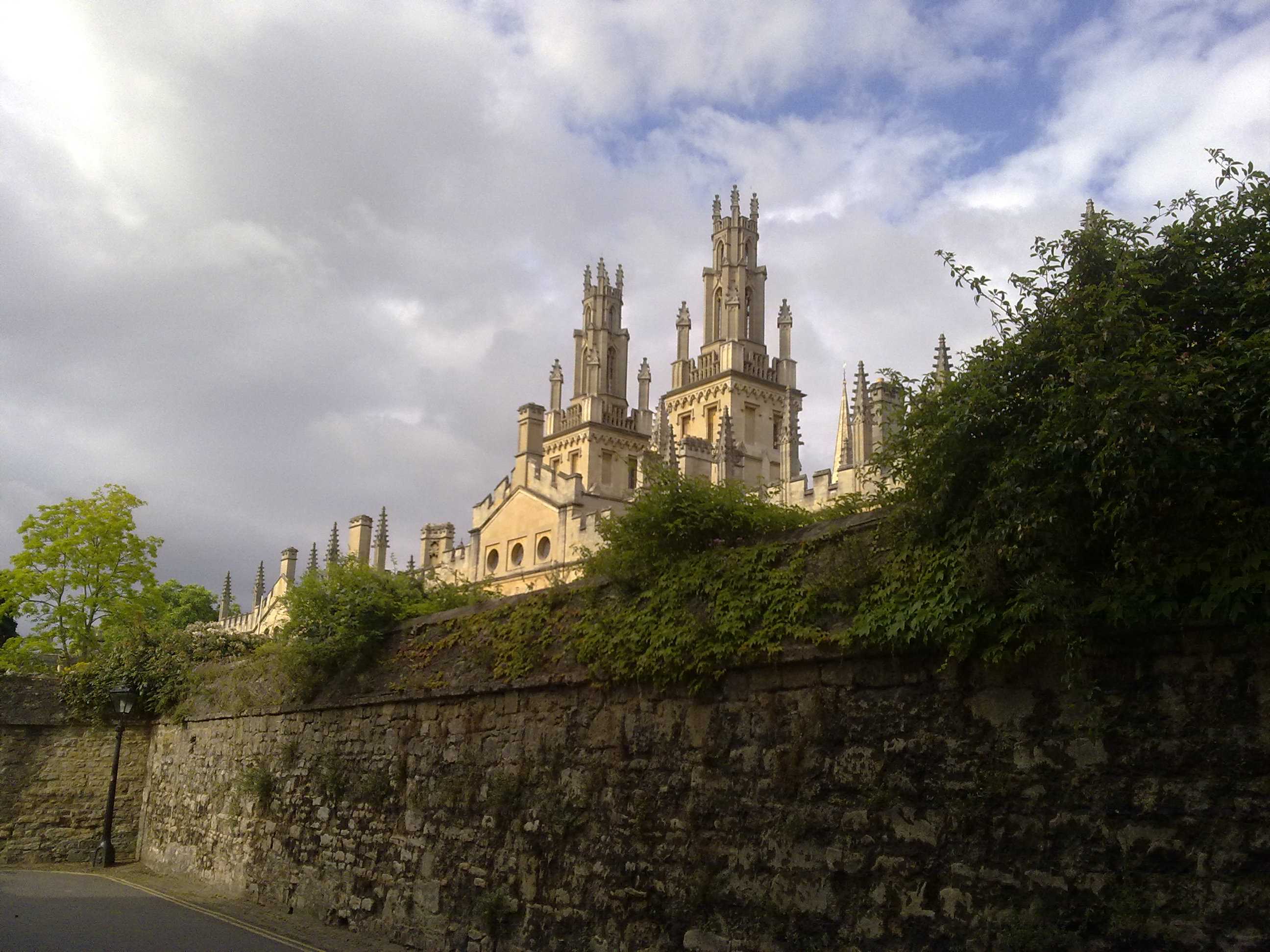
All Souls College as viewed from New College Lane

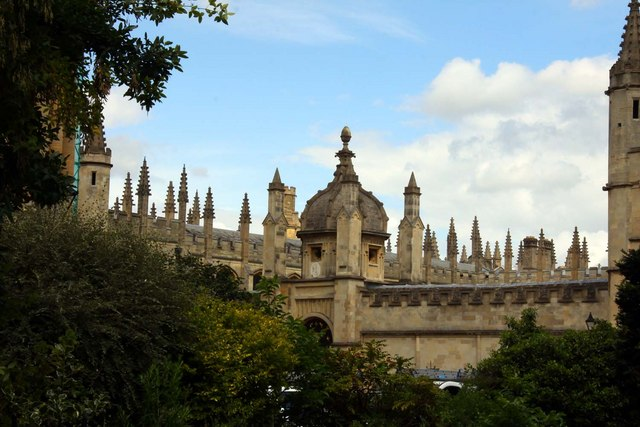
The spires of All Souls

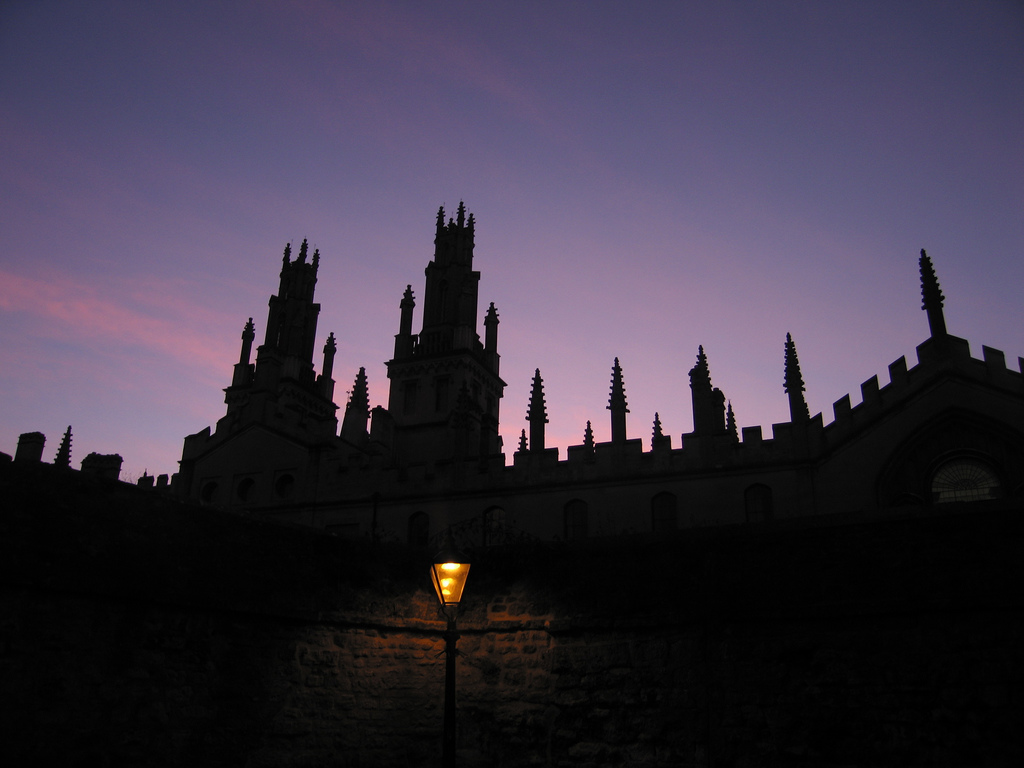
All Souls College at twilight

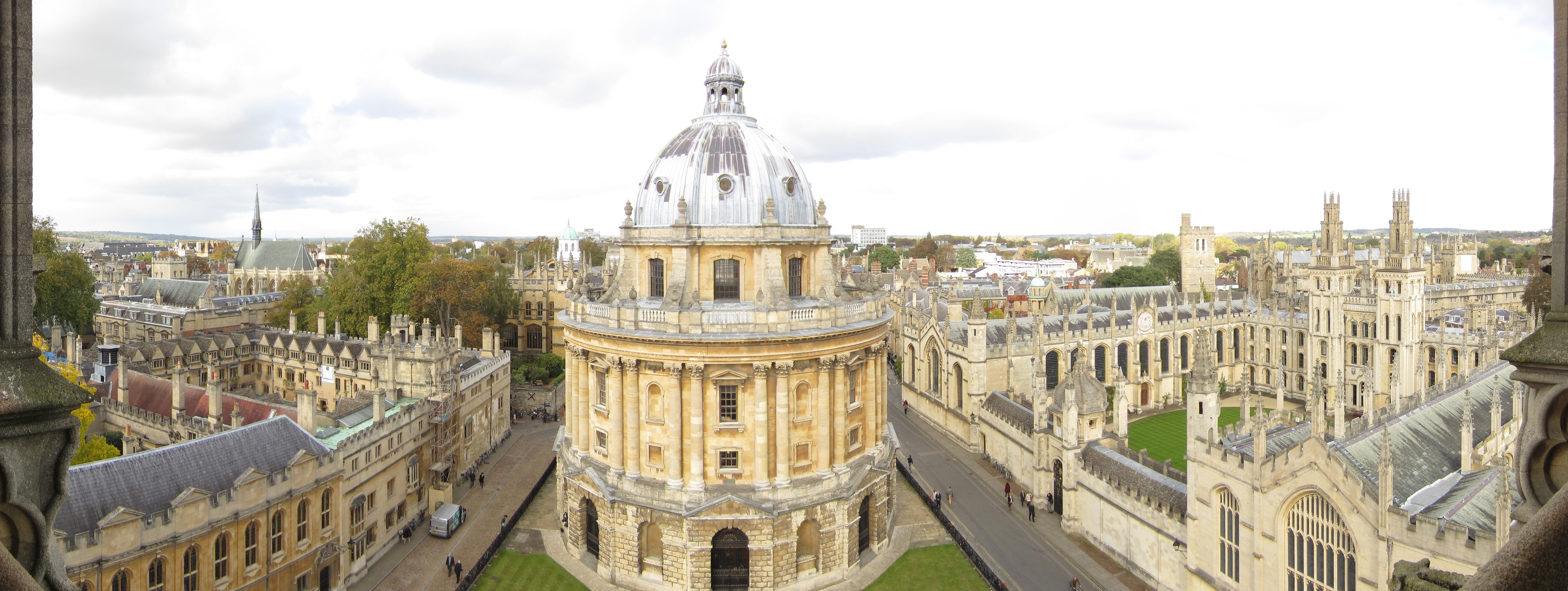
View from St Mary the Virgin's tower (with All Souls on the right)

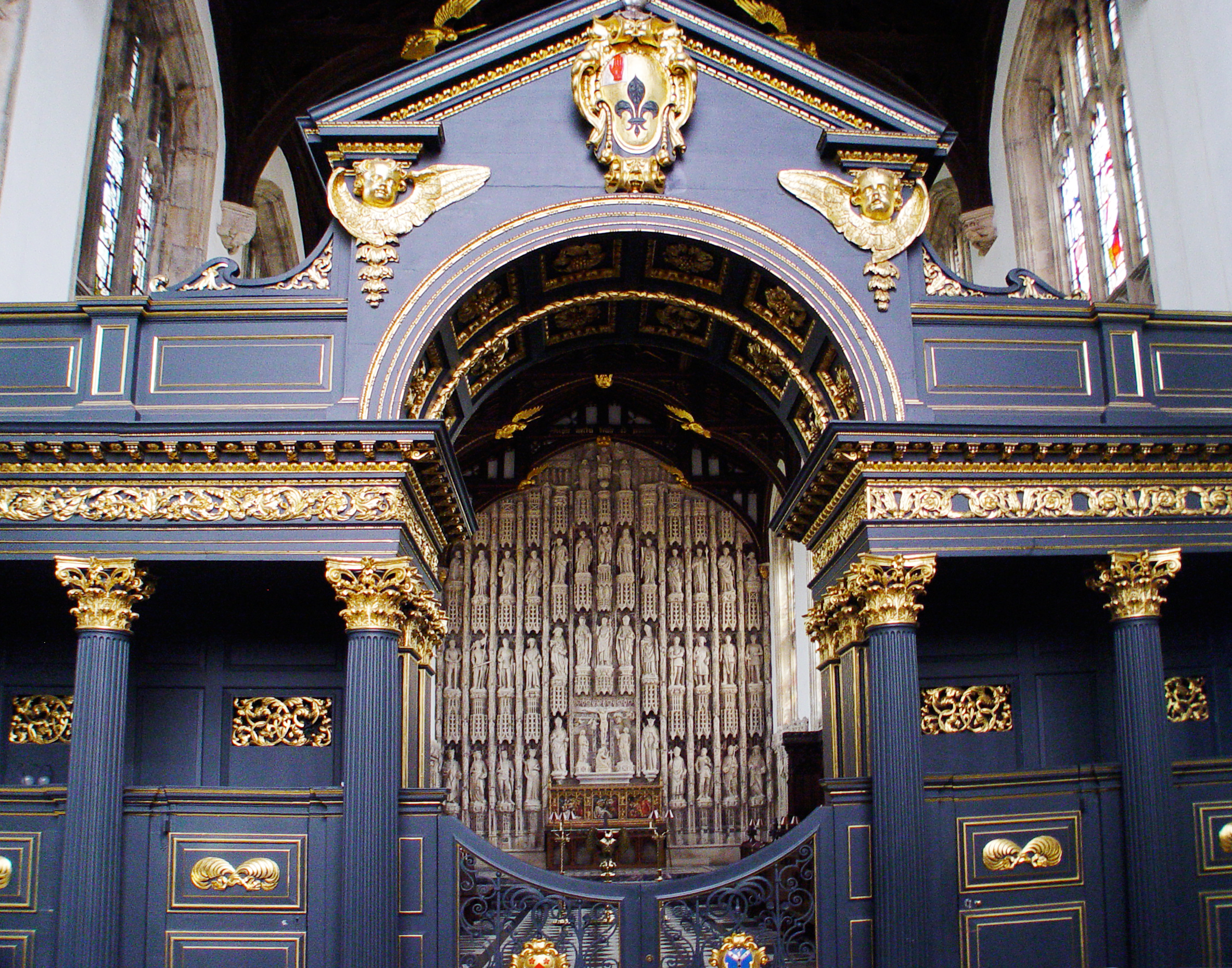
All Souls College Chapel - the stone altar reredos seen through the later classical screen

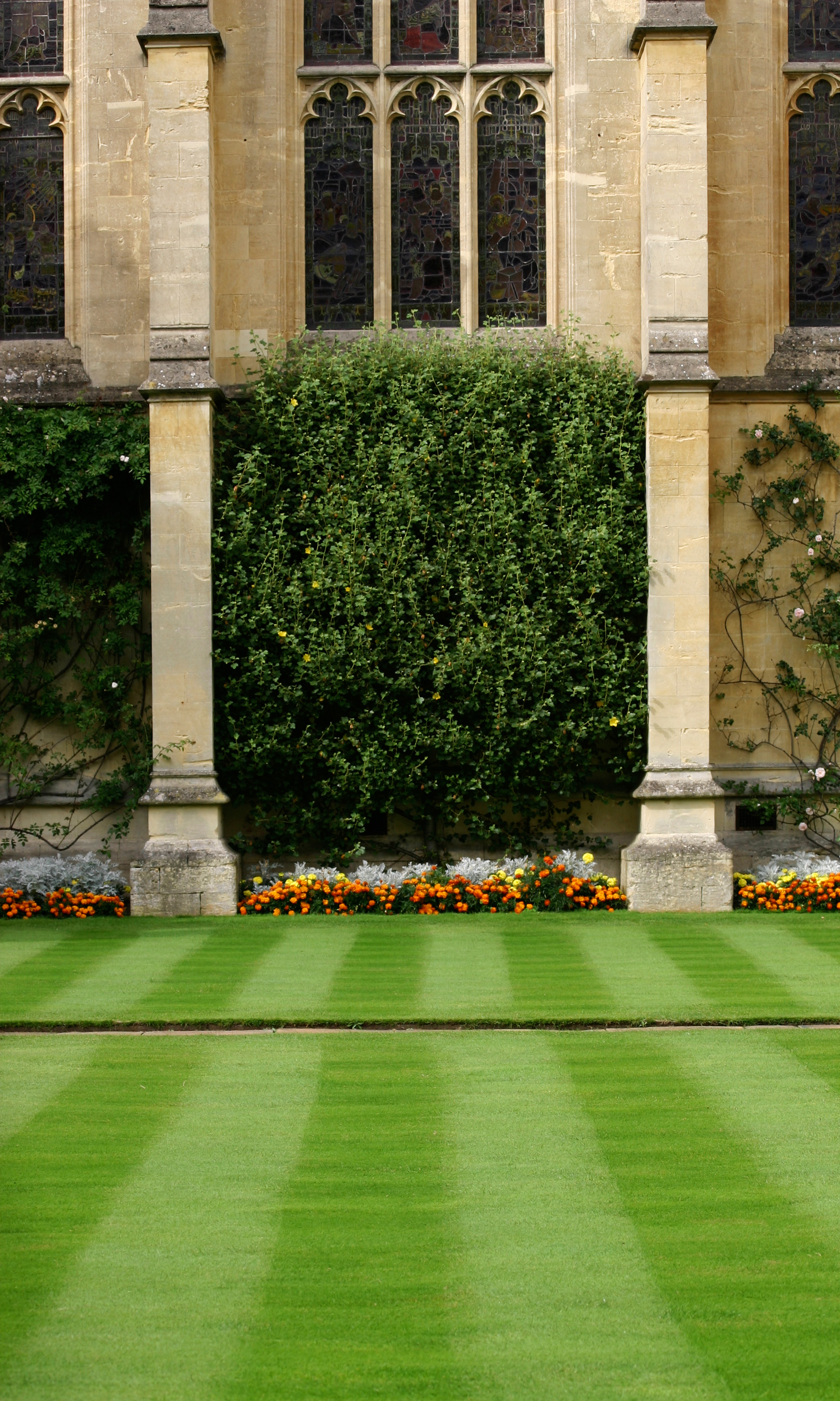
All Souls College

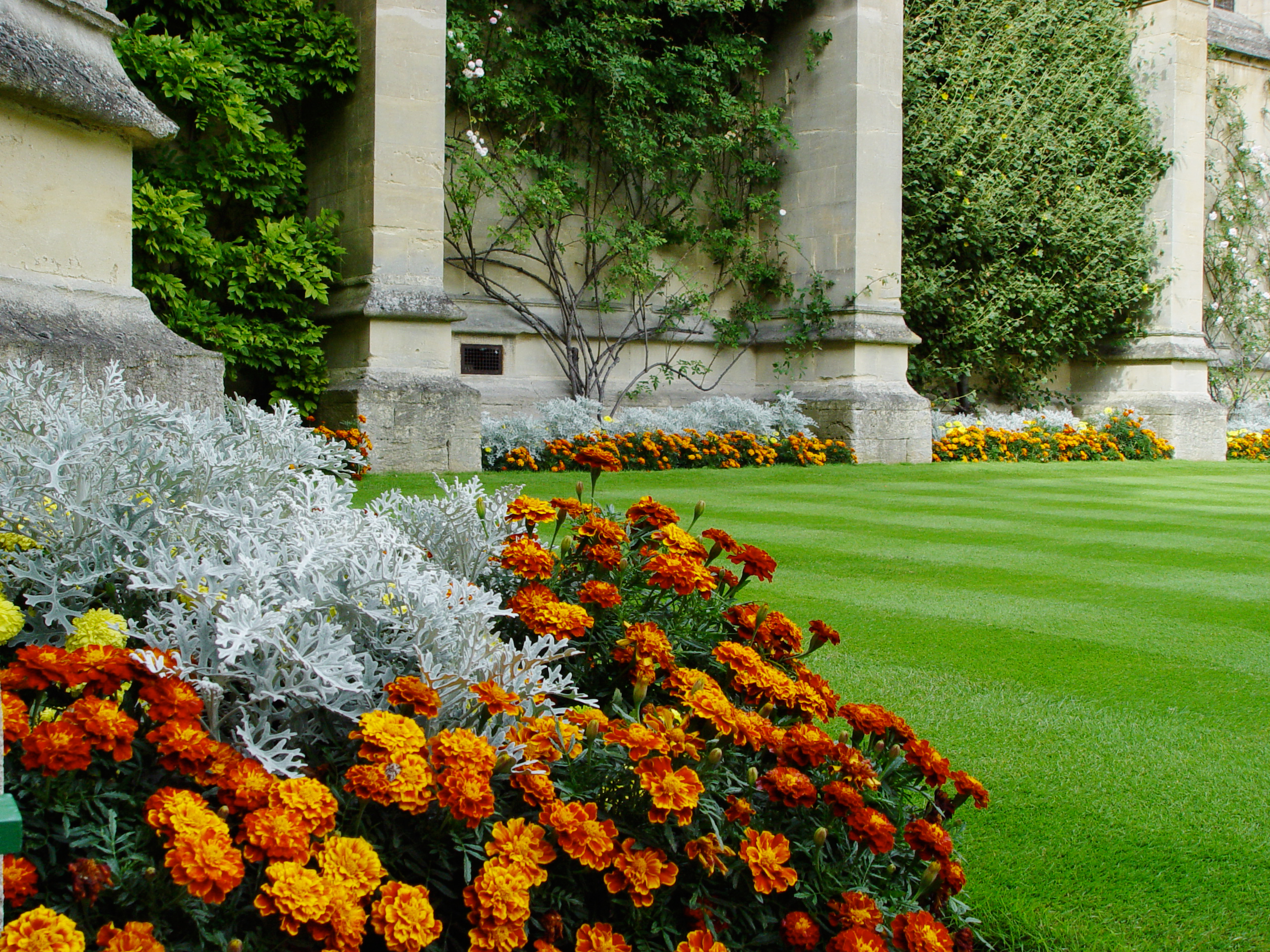
All Souls College

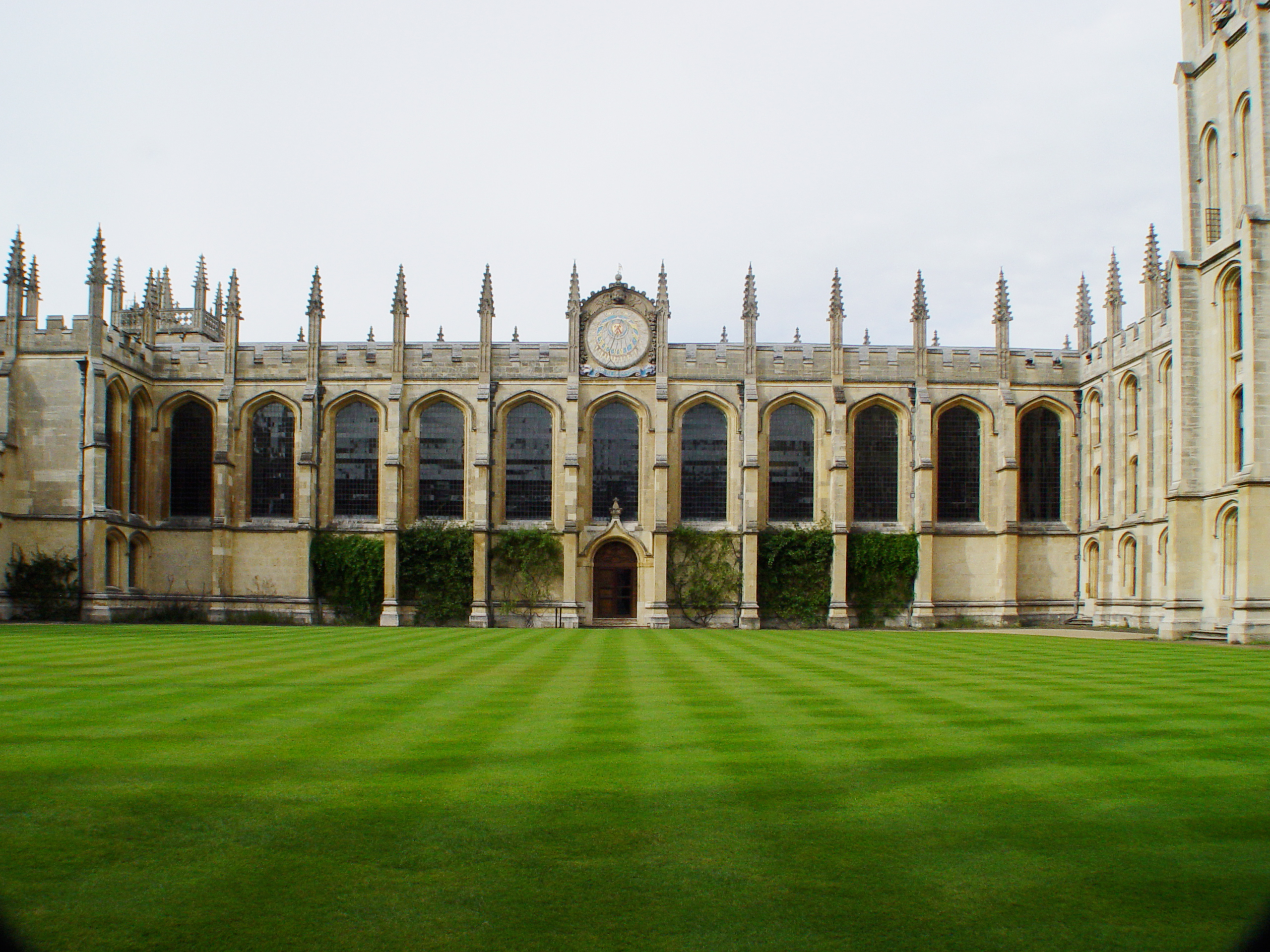
All Souls College. Though gothic externally, this range designed by Nicholas Hawksmoor is completely classical inside.
