= Brecken =

Brecken is a surname and a given name. Notable people with the name include:

== Surname ==
- Frederick de St Croix Brecken (1828–1903), Prince Edward Island lawyer and politician
- John Brecken (1800–1847), Prince Edward Island businessman and politician
- John Brecken (died 1827), English-born United Empire Loyalist
- Paul Brecken (1886–1960), Canadian politician
- Ralph Brecken (1770–1813), Prince Edward Island businessman

== Given name ==
- Brecken Hill (born 2003), American influencer
- Brecken Palmer (born 1998), American actor

== See also ==
- Bracken (disambiguation)
