= David Laird =

Canadian politician (1833–1914)

The Honourable David Laird PC
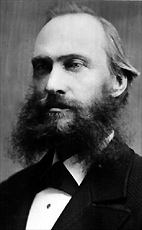
- The Hon. David Laird

3rd Lieutenant Governor of the North-West Territories
- In office October 7, 1876 – December 3, 1881
- Monarch: Victoria
- Governors General: The Earl of Dufferin; Marquess of Lorne
- Preceded by: Alexander Morris
- Succeeded by: Edgar Dewdney

Member of the Canadian Parliament for Queen's County
- In office September 29, 1873 – October 7, 1876
- Preceded by: none
- Succeeded by: James Colledge Pope

Member of the General Assembly of Prince Edward Island for 4th Queens
- In office 1871 – September 29, 1873 Serving with Benjamin Davies
- Preceded by: None
- Succeeded by: William Welsh

Personal details
- Born: March 12, 1833 New Glasgow, Prince Edward Island
- Died: January 12, 1914 (aged 80) Ottawa
- Party: Liberal
- Spouse: Mary Louise Owen (m. 1864)
- Children: 6
- Education: Presbyterian Theological Seminary
- Occupation: newspaper editor, publisher
- Profession: Politician

David Laird, PC (March 12, 1833 – January 12, 1914) was a Canadian politician. He was born in New Glasgow, Prince Edward Island, into a Presbyterian family noted for its civic activism. His father Alexander had been a long time Reformer and Liberal MLA. David became a Liberal MLA for Belfast. He also established and edited The Patriot.

After initially opposing Confederation, he led in the talks by which Prince Edward Island became a province of Canada. He became a Liberal member of the Canadian parliament in the government of Alexander Mackenzie. He served as minister of the interior and guided the passage of the Indian Act into Canadian law. He was the first resident lieutenant governor of North-West Territories. He was the fifth lieutenant governor in charge of the territory. He negotiated several aboriginal treaties. Even though David Laird adopted the paternalistic views of his time in working with aboriginals, colleagues noted his consistent hard work, reliability and honesty in his dealings as a federal official.

== Early life and family ==
David Laird was born in New Glasgow, Prince Edward Island, the son of Alexander Laird and Janet Orr. David's parents had emigrated from Renfrewshire, Scotland, to Prince Edward Island in 1819. His father was a successful farmer and member of the island's executive council. His older brother Alexander held an elected seat in the island's legislative assembly.

On June 30, 1864, David married Mary Louise Owen in Georgetown. Her brother, Lemuel Cambridge Owen, served as the island's postmaster. David and Mary Louise had six children: David Rennie, Mary Alice, Arthur Gordon, William Charles, James Harold (who became an Indian agent), and Fanny Louise.

David Laird attended the Presbyterian Theological Seminary in Truro, Nova Scotia, after which he planned to become a minister. He became a journalist and newspaper publisher and editor instead.

He subsequently returned to Forfar, Scotland.

== Public life ==
=== Prince Edward Island ===
In 1859, he founded a newspaper known as The Protestant and Evangelical Witness. In 1865, its name changed to the Patriot.

The first issue of The Protestant and Evangelical Witness in July 1859 proclaimed its purpose as "exposing the errors and noting the wiles and workings of popery." Laird tactfully reassured individual Catholic that he had not ill will toward them but his concern was only "the system by which they are enslaved."

David Laird originally opposed Canadian confederation. However, in spite of this opposition, he was sent to Ottawa in 1873 to negotiate the admission of Prince Edward Island to the new Dominion.

David Laird served on the Charlottetown City Council, its board of education and board of works, and he was a governor of the Prince of Wales College. He represented the electoral district of Belfast in the Prince Edward Island Legislative Assembly from 1871 to 1873. Then for the next four years he represented Queen's County in the Canadian House of Commons from 1873 to 1876.

As the leader of the Prince Edward Island Liberal members of parliament, he refused to support Prime Minister John A. Macdonald during the "Pacific Scandal". Thus, he helped bring down the Conservative government. Prime Minister Alexander Mackenzie succeeded Macdonald. Mackenzie appointed David Laird Minister of the Interior. He served as such from 1873 to 1876. Laird also served as a trustee and elder in the Presbyterian church. He was a member of the Auxiliary Bible Society, a vice-president of the Young Men's Christian Association and Literary Institute.

=== Minister of the Interior ===
During his term in parliament (1874-1876) he served as Superintendent-General of Indian Affairs, and Minister of the Interior. During his tenure as Superintendent-General of Indian Affairs, he championed the Indian Act through the Parliament, a legislation that would enable the government to realize its ultimate goal of paternalistically civilizing the natives of Canada. He earned the name 'He Whose Tongue is Not Forked'.

In 1874, Laird paved the way for the construction of the Canadian Pacific Railway and Dominion Telegraph by negotiating the Qu'Appelle Lakes Treaty (Treaty Four) with local First Nations groups in southern Saskatchewan, to procure land for the railway and telegraph lines.

=== Lieutenant Governor for the North-West Territories ===
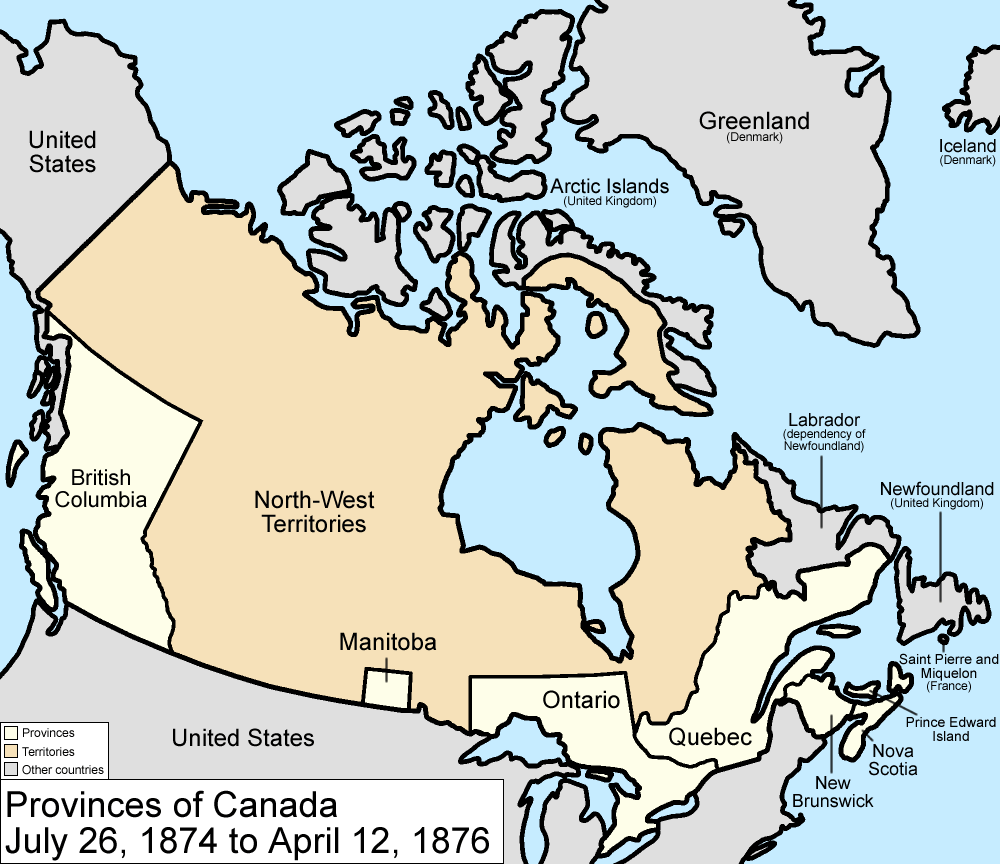
Canada 1874-1876

Prime Minister Alexander Mackenzie and Hewitt Bernard drafted the legislation for the North-West Territories Act in 1875.

In 1876, Mackenzie appointed Laird as Lieutenant Governor of the North-West Territories. He was responsible for the negotiations that brought the Blackfoot Confederacy together to sign Treaty 7. In 1899 he successfully negotiated Treaty 8 in the Athabasca district in the NWT.

Laird ordered the capital to be moved from Fort Livingstone to Battleford.

Laird held this office until 1881.

=== 1879 buffalo disappearance and famine ===
During the 1870s buffalo became scarce on the Canadian Prairies.

Laird warned the federal government of the problem:

The threatened early extinction of the Buffalo is a question of grave importance to the North West Territories of the Dominion. The flesh of that animal forms the principal means of subsistence of several of the Indian tribes, as well as a large number of the Half-breeds. The traffic in Buffalo peltries likewise enters largely into the trade of the country, and enables the natives to procure many of the necessaries of life.

By 1879 they had disappeared completely. This created a desperate situation for the Plains Indians. The federal government empowered Laird and Dewdney to develop a plan to meet the crisis. A council met at Battleford in late August 1879. This council resolved:

That the Conference having maturely considered the state of the Indians in the North-West Territories, and the sources from which they can supply themselves with food, is of opinion that the fears entertained of an approaching famine are only too well grounded, and that unless a very large supply of provisions is furnished by Government, for issue during the coming winter, a great number of Indians will be without the amount of food absolutely necessary to sustain life. Should this state of affairs arise, and it appears to the Conference to be inevitable, it will be fraught with such dire consequences not only to the Indians themselves, but to the many settlers scattered throughout the Territories, that immediate steps should be taken to avert, if possible, so great a calamity. Dyck (1970).

The council ordered that large quantities of beef, bacon, flour, fish and pemmican be distributed at various points in the North-West.

=== Return to Prince Edward Island ===
After his term as Lieutenant Governor expired in 1881, he returned to Prince Edward Island to run again for parliament. He was defeated in the election of 1882. After his defeat, he served as editor of the Charlottetown Patriot a newspaper in Charlottetown, until 1889.

== The Treaties ==
Numbered Treaties

In 1870, the government of Canada acquired the land previous owned by the Hudson's Bay Company. This change caused the aboriginal people concern and unease. In response to this, the government of Canada entered into treaty negotiations with the various tribes. David Laird, as a government official, played a significant role in treaties 4 through 8.

=== Treaty No. 4, the Qu'Appelle Treaty ===
Treaty 4 (1874) involved the Cree and Saulteaux. It covered most of current day southern Saskatchewan, plus small portions of what are today western Manitoba and southeastern Alberta. This treaty is also called the "Qu'appelle Treaty," as its first signings were conducted at Fort Qu'Appelle, Saskatchewan on 15 September 1874. Additional signings or adhesions would continue until September 1877.

The Commissioners of the Queen were: the Honourable Alexander Morris, Lieutenant Governor of the Province of Manitoba and the North-West Territories; the Honourable David Laird, Minister of the Interior, and William Joseph Christie, Esquire, of Brockville, Ontario and retired Hudson's Bay Company factor for the Saskatchewan district.

Morris led the negotiations. David Laird's presence allowed Morris to negotiate confident that the federal government would support the results.

=== Treaty No. 5, the Winnipeg Treaty ===
Treaty 5 (1875) involved the Saulteaux and Swampy Cree non-treaty tribes and peoples around Lake Winnipeg in the District of Keewatin. David Laird, Canada's Minister of the Interior, supported Alexander Morris as Morris led in the negotiations. Laird's interest was to get the native people to extinguish their claim to the land so that the incoming settlers could establish their own properties.

=== Treaty No. 6, Treaties at Fort Carlton and Pitt ===
Treaty Six (1876) involves the central portions of the present provinces of Alberta and Saskatchewan. Like the preceding Macdonald government, the Mackenzie government entered into treaties gradually. David Laird led out in this process as Interior Minister. The delay created unrest among the native tribes beyond the established treaty boundaries. Leaders residing in the West communicated their concern to the government in Ottawa. This included: the Lieutenant Governor for the region, Alexander Morris; Alfred Selwyn, the head of the Geological Survey working beyond the boundaries of Treaty Four; Lawrence Clarke, in charge of the Hudson's Bay Company's post of Fort Carlton; Commissioner French of the Mounted Police; and, Major-General Selby Smyth, the officer commanding the Canadian Militia.

The natives had been promised a treaty but negotiations had not begun. In the summer of 1875, a Geological Survey party and a telegraph construction crew worked beyond the Treaty Four boundaries where no treaty had yet been made. That summer the Cree stopped the Geological Survey from progress beyond the elbow of the North Saskatchewan. The telegraph crew was also stopped. At a Cree council, it was decided to not allow any further expeditions until a treaty had been made. Morris repeatedly telegraphed Laird about the need for a treaty. He finally received permission to arrange for a treaty negotiation with the Saskatchewan Cree for the following summer at Forts Carlton and Pitt.

David Laird arranged with the Surveyor General to prepare a map showing the boundaries for Treaty Six. Laird relied on Morris to use his experienced judgment in arranging the terms of the treaty: "Your large experience and past success in conducting Indian negotiations relieves me from the necessity of giving you any detailed instructions in reference to your present mission."

In 1877, David Laird reported to the Superintendent General of Indian Affairs (SGIA) in Ottawa that most of the bands in Treaty 6 had been supplied with seed and were beginning to farm. He mentioned that several of the Bands living near Carlton and Prince Albert were very pleased with the potatoes, grain, etc. They planned to get more seed and expand their farming operations. One Band had nearly 100 acres under cultivation.

=== Treaty No. 7, the Blackfoot Confederacy ===
Treaty 7 (1877) involved the Blackfoot in what is today the southern portion of Alberta. It was concluded on September 22, 1877. The agreement was signed at the Blackfoot Crossing of the Bow River, at the present-day Siksika Nation reserve, approximately 100 km east of Calgary. Chief Crowfoot was one of the signatories to Treaty 7.

The treaty established a reserve, promised annual payments and/or provisions from the federal government to the tribes and promised continued hunting and trapping rights on the "tract surrendered". In exchange, the tribes ceded their rights to their traditional territory.

In 1877, David Laird was the Lieutenant-Governor of the North-West Territories. The David Mills, the newly appointed Minister of the Interior, noted that the Blackfoot wanted to negotiate a treaty. Mills appointed two commissioners to carry out the task: Laird, who had assisted in the negotiation of Treaty Four in 1874 and Colonel James Macleod, who had recently been promoted to Commissioner of the North-West Mounted Police. Laird was obviously chosen because of his experience and official position, while Macleod was important because of the respect he commanded among the Blackfoot.

=== Treaty No. 8 ===
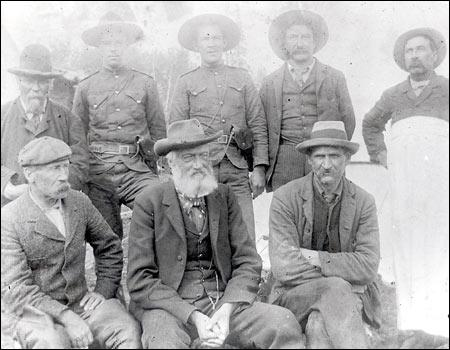
David Laird Treaty No. 8

May 1899, David Laird and staff traveled by train from Winnipeg to Edmonton. With thirteen wagons of provisions they continued north to Lesser Slave Lake. On June 20 Laird addressed the natives assembled:

Red Brothers! We have come here to-day, sent by the Great Mother to treat with you, and this is the paper she has given us, and is her commission to us signed with her Seal, to show we have authority to treat with you...I have to say, on behalf of the Queen and the Government of Canada, that we have come to make you an offer... As white people are coming into your country, we have thought it well to tell you what is required of you.... The Queen owns the country, but is willing to acknowledge the Indians' claims, and offers them terms as an offset to all of them... (Mair, 1908:56-59).

== The Indian Act ==
In 1876, David Laird, as Minister of the Interior in the Mackenzie government, oversaw the creation of the Indian Act. This legislation consolidated previous Indian legislation. It viewed Indians as children of the State:

Our Indian legislation generally rests on the principle, that the aboriginal peoples are to be kept in a condition of tutelage and treated as wards or children of the State. ...the true interests of the aborigines and of the State alike require that every effort should be made to aid the Red man in lifting himself out of his condition of tutelage and dependence, and that is clearly our wisdom and our duty, through education and every other means, to prepare him for a higher civilization by encouraging him to assume the privileges and responsibilities of full citizenship.

== Later years ==
Laird later moved back west to Manitoba. Twenty years after his first task to work with Plains Indigenous peoples, he was appointed Indian Commissioner of Manitoba, Keewatin and North-West Territories in 1898, and held that position until his death. After 1909 he also became an advisor for the Department of Indian Affairs.

As Indian Commissioner for Manitoba and the North-West Territories, Laird offered a strongly worded negative opinion to the debate of establishing Treaty 8 in Northern Saskatchewan. He said:

There was no particular necessity that the treaty should extend to that region. It was not a territory through which a railway was likely soon to run, nor was it frequented by miners, lumbermen, fishermen or other whites making use of the resources of its soils or waters, in which case, in my opinion, the Indians and Halfbreeds are better left to their hunting and fishing as a means of making a livelihood. The conditions there are the same still, and I therefore do not approve of any immediate steps being taken to include the territory . . . in treaty limits. The matter, I suggest, may very well stand over for the present; and, when the autonomy question is settled in the Northwest Territories, if it is found that any Province, or organized territory with representation, extends over a considerable tract of country in which aboriginal title has not been extinguished, then in such case, or from the entrance of a railway, the discovery of mines, or other cause to bring an inrush of whites, a treaty should be made without delay.

Laird was President of the Manitoba Historical and Scientific Society from 1903 to 1904. He died in Ottawa on January 12, 1914. The town of Laird, Saskatchewan was named in his honour.

== Critical views of Laird ==
Although early historians wrote positively of Laird's work with aboriginal people, he has not fared so well among more recent scholars.

Laird is acknowledged as hard-working and committed to negotiating treaties 4 through 7, but he viewed Indians as "improvident complainers, limited in intelligence," and "troublesome to deal with." He viewed Aboriginal culture as "ludicrous and grotesque." His success in getting natives to surrender the land was offset by his ensuring that his political allies benefited. He believed that higher education was wasted on Native youth. He advocated nothing more than instruction in "basic skills." Laird's policy of denying Indians both land and skills left native youth with few resources for success.

== Laird's legacy ==
The inclusion of Prince Edward Island as a province of the Canadian federation is due, in part, to the negotiation skill of David Laird.

His accomplishments in the arena of aboriginal matters continue to influence the present relationship between the Canadian government and native peoples. The Indian Act and the various treaties provide legal grounds for the courts.

In North Battleford, Saskatchewan, James Marshall has produced "stunning" brick relief sculptures depicting the area's heritage. He included a portrait of David Laird and Government House.

== Archives ==
There are David Laird fonds at Library and Archives Canada and the Public Archives and Records Office of Prince Edward Island.

== Electoral record ==
Canadian federal by-election, 29 September 1873
Party	Candidate	Votes	Elected
Liberal	David Laird	acclaimed	X
Liberal	Peter Sinclair	acclaimed	X

Canadian federal by-election, 3 December 1873
Party	Candidate	Votes	Elected
Liberal	David Laird	acclaimed	X
Called upon Mr. Laird being appointed Minister of the Interior, 7 November 1873

1874 Canadian federal election: Queen's County
Party	Candidate	Votes	Elected
Liberal	David Laird	acclaimed	X
Liberal	Peter Sinclair	acclaimed	X

1882 Canadian federal election: Queen's County
Party	Candidate	Votes	Elected
Liberal	Louis Henry Davies	3,164	X
Liberal–Conservative	John Theophilus Jenkins	3,122	X
Conservative	Frederick de Sainte-Croix Brecken	3,120	
Unknown	David Laird	2,759	

== See also ==
- 1st Council of the Northwest Territories
- Edgar Dewdney
