= Louis Henry Davies =

1870s Premier of PEI and Chief Justice of Canada from 1918 to 1924

The Right Honourable Sir Louis Henry Davies PC KCMG
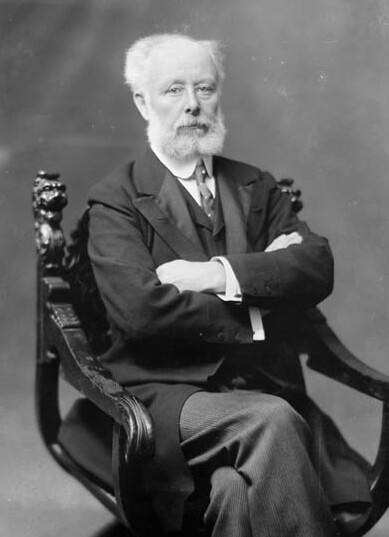
- Hon. Sir Davies, c. 1903

3rd Premier of Prince Edward Island
- In office August 15, 1876 – April 25, 1879
- Monarch: Victoria
- Lieutenant Governor: Robert Hodgson
- Preceded by: Lemuel Owen
- Succeeded by: William Wilfred Sullivan

6th Chief Justice of Canada
- In office October 23, 1918 – May 1, 1924
- Nominated by: Robert Borden
- Preceded by: Charles Fitzpatrick
- Succeeded by: Francis Alexander Anglin

Puisne Justice of the Supreme Court of Canada
- In office September 25, 1901 – October 23, 1918
- Nominated by: Wilfrid Laurier
Further information
Preceded by	George Edwin King
Succeeded by	Pierre-Basile Mignault
Leader of the Prince Edward Island Liberal Party
In office 1876 – June 20, 1882
Preceded by	Robert Haythorne
Succeeded by	John Yeo
Member of the General Assembly of Prince Edward Island for 4th Kings
In office 1872 – August 10, 1876 Serving with A.C. MacDonald, J.E. MacDonald
Preceded by	None
Succeeded by	James Robertson
Member of the General Assembly of Prince Edward Island for 5th Queens
In office August 10, 1876 – April 2, 1879 Serving with George W. Deblois
Preceded by	Frederick Brecken
Succeeded by	Neil McLeod
Member of Parliament for Queen's County
In office June 20, 1882 – June 23, 1896
Member of Parliament for West Queen's
In office June 23, 1896 – September 25, 1901
- Preceded by: created 1892
- Succeeded by: Donald Farquharson

Personal details
- Born: May 4, 1845 Charlottetown, Prince Edward Island Colony
- Died: May 1, 1924 (aged 78) Ottawa, Ontario, Canada
- Party: Liberal
- Other political affiliations: Prince Edward Island Liberal Party
- Spouse: Susan Wiggins (m. 1872)
- Relations: Benjamin Davies
- Children: 7
- Education: Prince of Wales College (now part of the University of Prince Edward Island)
- Occupation: Lawyer, judge, business person, and publisher
- Profession: Politician
- Cabinet: Attorney General (1876–1879); Solicitor General (1869); Minister of Marine and Fisheries (1896–1901)

Sir Louis Henry Davies PC KCMG (May 4, 1845 – May 1, 1924) was a Canadian businessman, politician, lawyer, and judge from the province of Prince Edward Island. In a public career spanning six decades, he served as the third premier of Prince Edward Island, a federal Member of Parliament, Cabinet minister, and as both a Puisne Justice and the sixth Chief Justice of Canada.

Born in Charlottetown to Liberal political Benjamin Davies, Davies was trained as a lawyer in London where he was called to the bar in 1866. He returned home the following year and began a career that quickly blended law and politics. Elected to the Island's legislature in 1872, he rose to lead the Liberal Party and in 1876 became premier, forming a coalition government that enacted the Public Schools Act of 1877, creating a non-sectarian public school system. His legal career was prominent, he served as counsel for the Prince Edward Island Land Commission, successfully argued in the Supreme Court of Canada's first decision Kelly v Sulivan, and later represented Canada at the Halifax Fisheries Commission, which secured a major award against the United States. After entering federal politics in 1882, he sat as a Liberal MP and became Wilfrid Laurier's minister of marine and fisheries.

Davies was appointed to the Supreme Court of Canada in 1901 and elevated to Chief Justice in 1918. His appointment was controversial, with critics noting his limited legal practice before politics, the patronage nature of his appointment by Wilfrid Laurier, and his continued private political involvement from the bench. His tenure as Chief Justice coincided with what historians have called the Court's "sterile years," marked by disunity and limited jurisprudential influence. In failing health, he remained in office until his death in 1924, after which Francis Alexander Anglin succeeded him as Chief Justice.

== Early life ==
Davies was born on May 4, 1845, in Charlottetown, Prince Edward Island, the son of Benjamin Davies and Kezia Attwood Watts. He was educated at Charlottetown's Central Academy and later at Prince of Wales College.

== Legal and political career ==
Davies was called to the bar in England in 1866 after reading law at the Inner Temple in London. He worked in the London office of Thomas Chitty, but moved back to Prince Edward Island where he was called to the bar in 1867.

Davies was first elected to the House of Assembly in 1872 as a Liberal, shortly before the colony entered Canadian Confederation. He had previously expressed the view that Confederation was neither just nor equitable for Prince Edward Island and had opposed the railway policy advanced by Premier James Colledge Pope. Once elected, however, Davies proved more pragmatic, recognizing the financial burden created by Pope's railway scheme and showing a willingness to consider union negotiations with Canada as a means of addressing the debt crisis. Following Confederation in 1873, many senior Liberals, including David Laird, departed for federal politics. In their absence, Davies was chosen as leader of the provincial Liberal Party in 1874.

One of the government's immediate priorities was resolving the long-standing land question. Davies strongly supported measures to eliminate the proprietorial system and was sharply critical of the first Land Purchase Act of 1874, which he regarded as overly generous to landlords. The bill was ultimately reserved by Lieutenant Governor Lemuel Cambridge Owen. A revised version of the bill, the Land Purchase Act, 1875, succeeded in authorizing a land commission to set purchase prices for proprietorial lands, laying the groundwork for comprehensive land reform on the Island.

In 1875, he was appointed lead counsel to the Prince Edward Island Land Commission, which had been created to resolve the long-standing problem of absentee land ownership and to provide Island tenants with secure title to their holdings. Although Davies at first declined to act for the tenantry before the commission, he eventually relented and appeared on their behalf alongside Samuel Robert Thomson, while Edward Jarvis Hodgson represented the landlords. He was successful, building a strong case by identifying weaknesses in the titles, qualities of land, and improvements of the proprietorial owners, with the popular consensus at the time that Davies secured a better deal for the tenants than expected. The issue of land rights eventually went before the Supreme Court of Canada in its first decision Kelly v Sulivan, which Davies appeared as the lawyer for Francis Kelly, the Commissioner of Public Lands of Prince Edward Island. The Court upheld the validity of the Land Purchase Act and the Superior Court's authority only to see that matters were properly before the land commissioners and that no fraud was committed.

=== Premier of Prince Edward Island ===
The most divisive issue remaining in Island politics after Confederation was school funding, specifically whether Prince Edward Island should maintain a unified public system or permit separate denominational schools for Catholics. Davies supported a single, non-sectarian public school system. The Schools Question fractured traditional party alignments. In the 1876 election, former premier James Colledge Pope rallied support for religious schools, while Davies led the so-called "Free School" party. The Free Schoolers secured a majority, defeating the Conservative government of Lemuel Cambridge Owen. Conservative John Yeo declined the premiership.

On August 15, 1876, Davies became the third Premier of Prince Edward Island and also served as Attorney General. He led a coalition government composed of Protestant Liberals and Conservatives united by their support for non-sectarian schools.

His government's first major legislative act was the passage of the Public Schools Act in April 1877. The statute made school attendance compulsory and established a non-sectarian public school system modeled on New Brunswick's Common Schools Act of 1871, introduced by George Edwin King. Catholic Bishop Peter McIntyre strongly opposed the measure and petitioned the federal government to disallow it, but Ottawa declined to intervene.

The province's finances remained precarious in the years following Confederation, with chronic deficits and limited ability to raise revenue through indirect import duty taxation. In response, the Charlottetown Council petitioned the legislature for authority to borrow money and levy taxes on personal property. Conservatives opposed the request, backed by a petition of 600 residents, but Davies supported new revenue measures. In 1877, his government introduced a taxation bill authorizing a land tax based on public assessment. The measure proved unpopular, as it exempted Charlottetown and Summerside and contained no mechanism for appeal. While the debate continued, Davies left the Island to serve as counsel for the British government before the Halifax Fisheries Commission, established under the Treaty of Washington (1871). The tribunal ultimately awarded $5.5 million in compensation to the British Government, payable by the United States. During this period, Island proprietors launched one final, unsuccessful legal challenge to the authority of the land commission.

By this time, the governing coalition had begun to fracture. Davies attempted to salvage the land tax bill by adding an appeal mechanism, but the effort came too late to restore support. His campaigning on behalf of the federal Liberal Party deepened the divisions, and on August 20, 1878, George Wastie Deblois and three other Conservatives resigned from Cabinet. Davis reached out to Catholic representatives, but they withheld their support, still angered by the government's school reforms.

On March 6, 1879, the Assembly passed a motion of no confidence against the government. In the election held the following month, Davies and the Liberals were decisively defeated, bringing his premiership and provincial political career to an end.

=== Member of Parliament ===
Davies entered federal politics in the 1882 general election, winning a seat as a Liberal in Queen's County, Prince Edward Island. He was re-elected in the same riding in 1887 and 1891, serving during this period as a member of the Liberal opposition.

Following redistribution, Queen's County was abolished after the 1891 election, and Davies stood in the new riding of West Queen's in 1896. That year, although the Conservative under Prime Minister Charles Tupper won a plurality of the popular vote, the Liberals under Sir Wilfrid Laurier secured a majority of seats and formed government. Laurier appointed Davies to Cabinet as Minister of Marine and Fisheries, a portfolio he held until his elevation to the Supreme Court in 1901. During his tenure, Davies also served as a Canadian member of the Anglo-American Joint High Commission at Quebec.

Davies was acclaimed in the July 1896 ministerial by-election required upon joining Cabinet, and he was returned to Parliament in the 1900 federal election, defeating Conservative candidate William S. Stewart.

== Justice of the Supreme Court of Canada ==
On September 25, 1901, Davies was appointed to the Supreme Court of Canada by Prime Minister Wilfrid Laurier to replace George Edwin King who died in office on May 7, 1901. Historians Snell and Vaughn note that Davis did not have experience in law, with only five years of practice before moving to elected government, the appointment was earned through his service to the Liberal party and government, and was criticized by the legal community. Davis continued to participate in politics on the bench, giving private political advice to active politicians.

=== Chief Justice of Canada ===
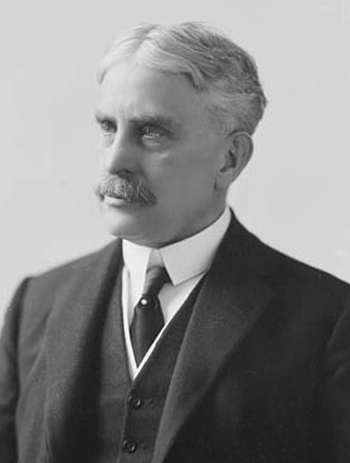
Conservative Prime Minister Robert Borden appointed Davies the Chief Justice of Canada, despite Davies being a lifelong Liberal.

On October 21, 1918, Chief Justice Charles Fitzpatrick unexpectedly resigned at age 66, citing declining health, and was appointed Lieutenant Governor of Quebec.

On October 23, 1918, Prime Minister Borden appointed Davies as the sixth Chief Justice of Canada. Davies, the senior puisne justice with 17 years on the bench, was in poor health at age 73 years, 172 days. Two months earlier, he had sent Borden two telegrams expressing interest in the position, citing his credentials, and promising to resign in three years after reaching 20 years of service. Cabinet approved his appointment by a narrow majority. Although it was publicly expected that Lyman Duff or Francis Alexander Anglin would be chosen, Snell and Vaughan note there is little evidence that the government seriously considered other candidates.

Davies was appointed to the Judicial Committee of the Privy Council where he heard three appeals but did not write any reported opinions.

In its final year, the Davies Court struggled to maintain quorum. Justice Idington, then 83, no longer had the mind capable of functioning at the same capacity. Justice Malouin fell ill and resigned soon after the appointment of the new Chief Justice. On May 1, 1924, Chief Justice Louis Henry Davies died at age 78. He had planned to retire in 1921 but stayed on due to a dispute over the value of his pension. By late 1923, his health had declined to the point that he could no longer perform his duties. Prime Minister Mackenzie King privately accused him of remaining in office too long. On September 16, 1924, Francis Alexander Anglin was appointed as the seventh Chief Justice of Canada.

Snell and Vaughan describe the appointment of Davies as a weak choice for Chief Justice, as he was elderly, had not distinguished himself on the Court, and lacked demonstrated leadership ability.

== Personal life ==
In July, 1872, he married Susan Wiggins, a daughter of Dr. A. V. G. Wiggins. She was a member of the Humane Society, the Women's Canadian Historical Society, and similar organizations. The couple had two sons and three daughters.

In 1874, Davies began construction of his home Riverside, a Second Empire style residence on the bank of the Hillsborough River in Charlottetown. The home was designated as a heritage resource by the City of Charlottetown in 1979. His father's home Benjamin Davies' House in Charlottetown, constructed around 1860, was also designated a heritage resource by the City of Charlottetown in 1979.

== Legacy ==
Davies was appointed Queen's Counsel in 1880, and knighted by Queen Victoria in 1897.

As of 2025, Davies remains the last Chief Justice of Canada to have previously held elected office. He is also the only Prince Edward Islander ever to serve on the Supreme Court of Canada.

In 1937, he was designated a Person of National Historic Significance under the Historic Sites and Monuments Act in recognition of his contributions as Premier of Prince Edward Island and Chief Justice of Canada. A commemorative plaque marking the designation is installed at the Sir Louis Henry Davies Law Courts in Charlottetown, which houses the Court of Appeal of Prince Edward Island.

Two geographical features in British Columbia bear his name. Davies Point, located where Hastings and Alice Arms meet on Observatory Inlet, was named in his honour at the time of his appointment to the Supreme Court. Similarly, Davies Bay, at the head of Work Channel east of Prince Rupert, commemorates him.

Historian Ian Bushnell has described the Supreme Court between 1903 and 1929, the period encompassing the Taschereau, Fitzpatrick, Davies, and Anglin Courts, as "the sterile years." During this era, divisions among the justices were particularly pronounced, the Court produced judgments that lacked consistent guiding principles which limited the Jurisprudential value of the Court's decisions.

== Electoral record ==
1887 Canadian federal election: Queen's County
Party	Candidate	Votes	Elected
Liberal	Louis Henry Davies	4,382	X
Independent Liberal	William Welsh	4,314	X
Conservative	Donald Ferguson	3,599	
Conservative	William Campbell	3,430	

1891 Canadian federal election: Queen's County
Party	Candidate	Votes	Elected
Liberal	Louis Henry Davies	4,006	X
Independent Liberal	William Welsh	3,854	X
Conservative	Patrick Blake	3,669	
Conservative	Donald Ferguson	3,521	

1896 Canadian federal election: West Queen's
Party	Candidate	Votes
Liberal	Louis Henry Davies	1,985
Conservative	J.J. Jenkins	1,651

1900 Canadian federal election: West Queen's
Party	Candidate	Votes
Liberal	Louis Henry Davies	2,528
Conservative	William S. Stewart	1,793
