= Charles Marcon =

Charles Marcon may refer to

- Charles Abdy Marcon (1853–1953), English clergyman
- Sholto Marcon (Charles Sholto Wyndham Marcon, 1890–1959), schoolmaster and hockey player
