= Dick Duckworth =

Dick or Richard Duckworth may refer to:

- Dick Duckworth (footballer, born 1882), English football player
- Dick Duckworth (footballer, born 1906) (1906–1983), English footballer and manager
- Richard Duckworth (campanologist)
- Richard John Duckworth, officer in the Indian Air Force
- Richard Duckworth of the Duckworth baronets
