= William Charles Salter =

Church of England clergyman

William Charles Salter (25 June 1824 – 1 August 1889) was a Church of England clergyman, Fellow of Balliol College, Oxford, and the last Principal of St Alban Hall.

== Early life ==
Salter was the only son of James Salter, gentleman, of Tiverton, Devon, and was educated at Blundell's School between August 1832 and April 1843. He was admitted to membership of Balliol College in 1842, aged eighteen, and became a Blundell Scholar, graduating BA in 1846 and proceeding to MA in 1851.

== Career ==
Salter was a Fellow of his college from 1848 to 1862. In 1861, he was appointed as Principal of St Alban Hall, a medieval hall of the university with its origins in the 13th century. His life as a college fellow had required celibacy, and in 1862 at Bloxworth, Dorset, Salter married Emma Louisa Augusta Pickard-Cambridge, a younger sister of Octavius Pickard-Cambridge. They had two sons, William (1863–1948) and Henry Stuart Salter (1864–1939).

When he resigned as Principal of St Alban Hall in 1882, the hall was extinguished and merged into Merton College, Oxford, which then demolished its buildings.

Salter was also Rector of Brattleby, Lincolnshire, from 1861 to 1884. He died at Oxford in 1889.

== Selected publications ==
- Drummond Percy Chase, William Charles Salter, Education for Frugal Men at the University of Oxford: An Account of the Experiments at St. Mary's and St. Alban's Halls (Oxford and London: John Henry and James Parker, 1864)
