= Louis Jenkins =

Louis Jenkins could refer to:

- Louis Jenkins (politician) (1869-1939)
- Louis Jenkins (poet) (1942-2019), American prose poet
- Woody Jenkins (Louis Elwood Jenkins Jr.) (born 1947), American journalist and politician

== See also ==
- Louise Freeland Jenkins (1888-1970), American astronomer
