= William Morfill =

British professor (1834–1909)

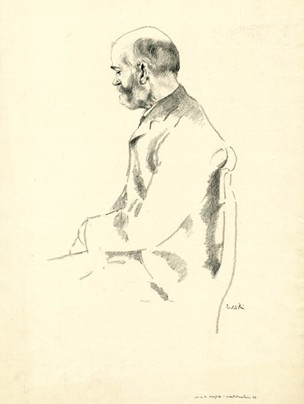
William Morfill, 1894 lithograph by William Rothenstein

William Richard Morfill FBA (17 November 1834 – 9 November 1909) was Professor of Russian and the other Slavonic languages at the University of Oxford from 1900 until his death. He was the first professor of Russian in Britain, and his house in North Oxford was marked with a commemorative blue plaque by the Oxfordshire Blue Plaques Board in 2009.

== Life ==
William Richard Morfill, the second child and first son of a professional musician called William Morfill from Maidstone, Kent, was born on 17 November 1834. After studying at Maidstone Grammar School and Tonbridge School, he matriculated at the University of Oxford as a member of Corpus Christi College, on 28 May 1853. He moved to Oriel College with a scholarship in classics later in 1853. He obtained his BA degree in 1857, although this was only a pass degree as he had fallen seriously ill during the examinations. He remained in Oxford after graduation, giving private tuition. His Oxford MA was awarded in 1860, the same year in which he married Charlotte Lee and in which his first published translations from Russian appeared.

Between 1865 and 1869, he lectured in philosophy and modern history at one of the private halls attached to the university, Charsley's Hall.

Morfill had had an interest in foreign languages since school days, encouraged by a Tonbridge teacher who gave him a Russian grammar. He first visited Russia in 1870 and Prague in 1871, learning languages as he travelled; a visit to Georgia in 1888 led to an article on Georgian literature. His interest in Slavonic languages was rewarded with his appointment in 1870 by Oxford to provide the first lectures of the Ilchester Foundation, endowed to encourage studies in this area. He gave further lectures in this series in 1873 and 1883, leading to his 1883 publication Dawn of European Literature: Slavonic Literature. By this stage, his wife had died (in 1881; there were no children) and he took comfort in his work. He was appointed Reader in Russian and the other Slavonic languages in 1889 and Professor in 1900. Russian was not a degree subject at Oxford until 1904: it has been said that Oxford's "approval of the languages he had cultivated while they lay outside the curriculum is Morfill's most enduring achievement."

He was the first professor of Russian in Britain. He also became Curator of the Taylor Institution and was appointed a Fellow of the British Academy in 1903. He was awarded an honorary doctorate by Charles University, Prague in 1908. His publications included Slavonic Literature (1883), A history of Russia from the birth of Peter the Great to the death of Alexander II (1902) and various books on grammar in Polish, Serbian, Bulgarian and Russian, as well as translations. He died on 9 November 1909 and was buried in the same grave as his wife.

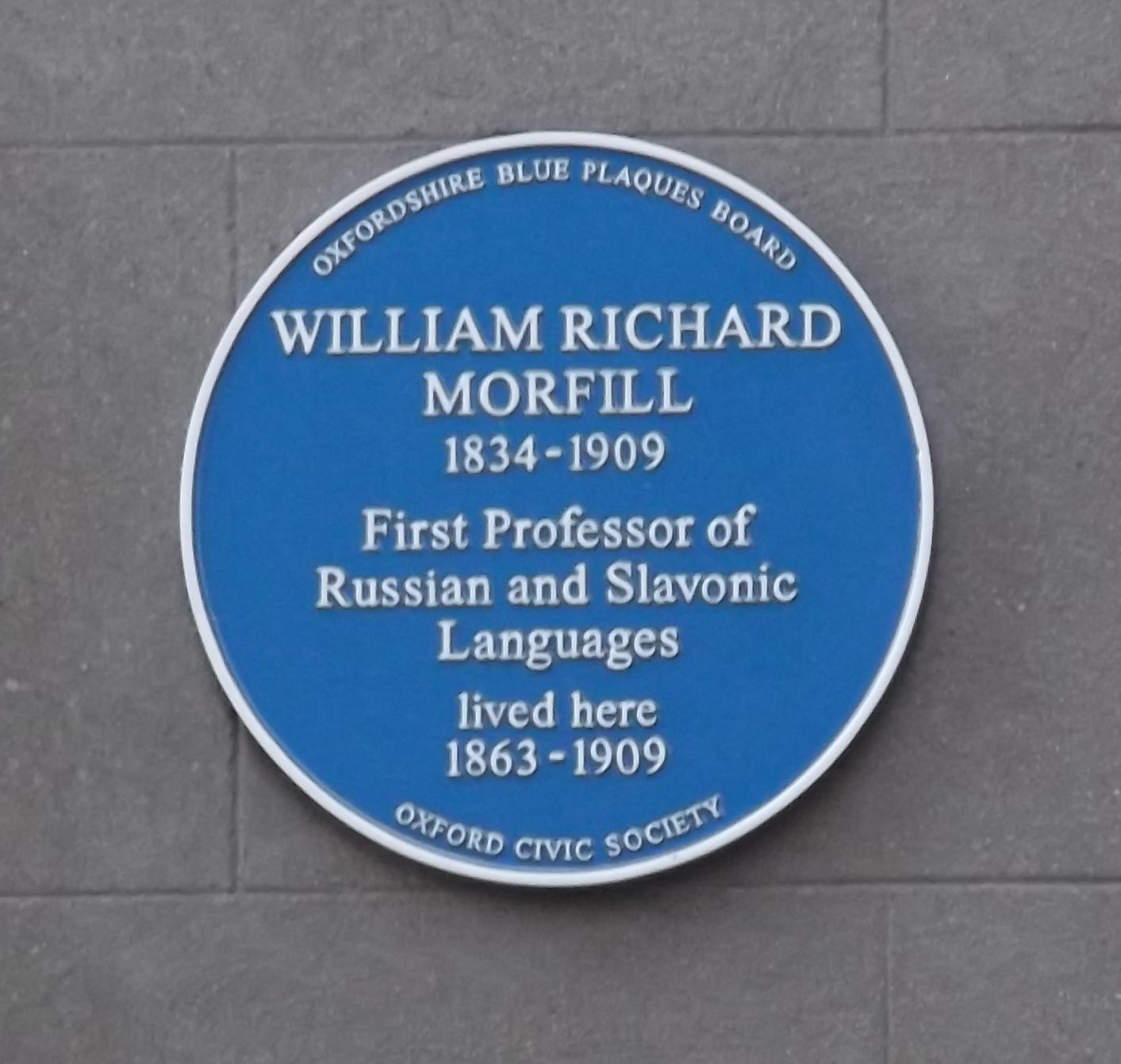
William Richard Morfill, commemorative plaque in Park Town, Oxford

In 2009, the Oxfordshire Blue Plaques Board marked 42 Park Town, where Morfill lived from 1863 to 1899, with a plaque to commemorate him. The Board's secretary said that the house had been like a "cultural embassy", where people came to learn languages, and that Morfill had been chosen for being a "great pioneer" who had spent his life establishing Russian and Slavonic languages in Oxford.

== Works ==
- William Richard Morfill (1884). A Simplified Grammar of the Polish Language. Trübner.
- William Richard Morfill (1887). Simplified Grammar of the Serbian Language. Trübner.
- William Morfill (1896). The Book of the Secrets of Enoch (or 2Enoch), translated from Mss Russian Codex Chludovianus, Bulgarian Codex Belgradensi, Codex Belgradensis Serbius. In Rev. Marco Lupi Speranza / Marco Enrico de Graya (introduction by), I Libri di Enoch – Edizione integrale restaurata, Lulu Press, Raleigh (NC) 2018, translated by Rev. Marco Lupi Speranza, ISBN 978-0-24-499608-6. Integrated edition of 1 Enoch, 2 Enoch, 3 Enoch, The Book of Giants, The Book of Noah, The Genesis Apocryphon, Apocalypse and Triumph of Melchisedec, and other Manuscripts of Qumran.
- William Richard Morfill (1897). A Short Grammar of the Bulgarian Language: With Reading Lessons. London: Kegan Paul, Trench, Trübner & Company Limited.
- William Richard Morfill (1889). A Grammar of the Russian Language. Clarendon Press.
- William Richard Morfill (1890). The Story of Russia. G.P. Putnam's Sons.
- William Richard Morfill (1899). A Grammar of the Bohemian or Czech language. Clarendon Press.
- William Richard Morfill (1902). A History of Russia from the Birth of Peter the Great to the Death of Alexander II. Methuen, London.
- Morfill, William Richard (1904). "Slavonic Religion". Religious Systems of the World: A Contribution to the Study of Comparative Religion. I. Swan Sonnenschein & Co.: 266.
