= William Welsh (Canadian politician) =

Canadian politician

William Welsh (November 22, 1822 – June 22, 1905) was a merchant, ship owner and politician in Prince Edward Island. He represented Queen's County in the House of Commons of Canada from 1887 to 1896 as an Independent Liberal and then Liberal member. Welsh represented 4th Queens in the Legislative Assembly of Prince Edward Island from 1873 to 1878 as a Liberal member.

He was born on Prince Edward Island, the son of Charles Welsh, and educated in Charlottetown. In 1854, he married Maria J. Pethick. He was a justice of the peace and served in the local militia, reaching the rank of major. He was first elected to the provincial assembly in an 1873 by-election held after David Laird was elected to the House of Commons. He ran unsuccessfully for a federal seat in 1876 and 1884. Welsh was defeated in a bid for reelection in East Queen's in 1896.

Canadian federal by-election, 19 August 1884
Party	Candidate	Votes
Liberal–Conservative	John Theophilus Jenkins	3,428
Unknown	William Welsh	3,388
On Mr. Brecken being appointed Postmaster of Charlottetown, August 1884

1887 Canadian federal election: Queen's County
Party	Candidate	Votes	Elected	
Liberal	Louis Henry Davies	4,382	X	
Independent Liberal	William Welsh	4,314	–	X
Conservative	Donald Ferguson	3,599		
Conservative	William Campbell	3,430		

1891 Canadian federal election: Queen's County
Party	Candidate	Votes	Elected
Liberal	Louis Henry Davies	4,006	X
Independent Liberal	William Welsh	3,854	X
Conservative	Patrick Blake	3,669	
Conservative	Donald Ferguson	3,521	
