= 1879 Prince Edward Island general election =

Canadian provincial election

The 1879 Prince Edward Island election was held on 4 February 1879 to elect members of the House of Assembly of the province of Prince Edward Island, Canada. It was won by the Conservative party.

Party	Leader	1876	Seats won	Popular vote	(%)
Conservative	William Wilfred Sullivan	15	24		
Liberal	Louis Henry Davies	7	6		
Totals		30	30		
