= Drummond Percy Chase =

Drummond Percy Chase (14 September 1820 – 27 June 1902) was the Principal of St Mary's Hall, Oxford.

== Life ==
Chase was born on 14 September 1820, at Château de Saulruit, near Saint-Omer, the second son of John Woodford Chase of Cosgrave, Northamptonshire. He matriculated from Pembroke College, Oxford on 15 February 1839, became scholar of Oriel College on 22 May 1839, and was one of four who obtained first-class honours in classics in Michaelmas term, 1841. He graduated B.A. on 25 November 1841, proceeding M.A. on 14 June 1844 and D.D. in 1880, and was ordained deacon in 1844 and priest in 1849.

He was elected fellow of Oriel College on 1 April 1842, just when the question of John Henry Newman's relation to the Anglican church was at its acutest phase (see Tract 90). He retained his fellowship till his death, sixty years afterwards. He was tutor of Oriel from 1847 to 1849 and again from 1860 to 1866. He was senior proctor of the University in 1853, and printed his Latin speech on going out of office on 26 April 1854. He was a select preacher before the university in 1860, and was vicar of the University Church of St Mary the Virgin, Oxford, from 1855 to 1863 and again from 1876 to 1878.

In 1848, Chase became vice-principal of St. Mary Hall, Oxford, the principal being Philip Bliss. In 1857, he was appointed principal on Bliss's death, and set himself vigorously to reform the place. He would admit no idle or extravagant candidate who was seeking to migrate from a college. But he welcomed diligent and frugal men, whose poverty excluded them from expensive colleges. The institution of the non-collegiate body in 1868, and the foundation of Keble College in 1870, made other and better provision in the university for poor undergraduates. Chase therefore advised the university commissioners of 1877 to merge, on his death, St. Mary Hall in Oriel College, with which it was connected both locally and personally. This suggestion was embodied in the Commissioners' Statutes in 1881, and accordingly, on Chase's death in 1902, St. Mary Hall ceased, after an independent existence of nearly six hundred years.

On his death, Chase was described with the following words in The Times obituary: "conservative in all academic matters, he never allowed differences of opinion to influence personal relations. Shrewd and witty in conversation, keenly appreciative of humour, full of anecdote and reminiscence, seasoning all with a genial if somewhat cynical flavour, the soul of hospitality, he was most popular in Oxford society."

He died at his lodgings on 27 June 1902.

== Works ==
He is most well known for his translation of the Nicomachean Ethics. He is the author as D. P. Chase D.D. of Constitutional Loyalty and other Words Necessary for these Times, published by Rivingtons, London in 1886. According to the publisher of that book he is also the author of The Epistle of Paul the Apostle to the Romans. With William Charles Salter, Principal of St Alban Hall, Chase also wrote Education for Frugal Men at the University of Oxford: An Account of the Experiments at St. Mary's and St. Alban's Halls (Oxford and London: John Henry and James Parker, 1864).

== Sources ==
- This article incorporates text from a publication now in the public domain: Clark, Andrew (1912). "Chase, Drummond Percy". In Lee, Sidney (ed.). Dictionary of National Biography (2nd supplement). London: Smith, Elder & Co.
