= Academic halls of the University of Oxford =

Former educational institutions within the University of Oxford

The academic halls were educational institutions within the University of Oxford. The principal difference between a college and a hall was that whereas the former are governed by the fellows of the college, the halls were governed by their principals. Of over a hundred halls in the Middle Ages, only St Edmund Hall survived into the mid-20th century, becoming a college in 1957.

== History ==
=== Middle Ages ===
Historians believe that by the beginning of the 13th Century Oxford's student population exceeded fifteen hundred and was equal in size to the town's non-student population. Throughout this period, students and their masters lived either as lodgers or as private tenants in accommodation owned by the townsfolk. The students and their masters depended on the townsfolk for their basic needs, namely food and accommodation. Essentially, half of Oxford's population were consumers only, leaving the other half of the town's population to profit from them.

At this point in time, the nascent university owned no buildings. As in Europe's other fledgling university, Paris, a rudimentary body of masters existed to regulate professional matters of mutual concern and masters were responsible for renting suitable premises for their lectures. Oxford's informal association of masters had no real authority and relied upon its members' clerical status and prestige for protection. Unsurprisingly, the association of masters was unable to curb the behaviour of the unsupervised students taking up residence in Oxford. The ongoing feuds between the university cohort and the townsfolk threatened the existence of higher education in Oxford. To counter this threat, the masters sought to combat the public disorder by curbing profiteering by the townspeople as landlords and tradespeople and reining in the students' freedoms. These attempts led to the gradual introduction of academic halls as the officially recognised accommodation for students.

Student housing was regulated as early as 1214, when a papal legate issued an ordinance to resolve a dispute over two clerks who had been hanged by townspeople. The rent of all "hospitia [houses] let to clerks" was to be halved for ten years. These hospitia developed into the medieval academic halls. A typical hall would have been a house with a narrow street frontage consisting of a single-storey communal hall and smaller rooms for students, two to four to a room. Later in the 13th century the first colleges were founded: University (1249), Balliol (1263) and Merton (1264).

The religious privileges enjoyed by students and masters and the presence of so many clerks lead to jurisdictional disputes between the university's attendees and the townsfolk. Moreover, differences between academics related to England's north south divide and an influx of poorly behaved young students with no higher authority to answer to, made thirteenth-century Oxford a volatile place.

The earliest colleges were intended for graduates; however New College (1379) admitted undergraduates from the beginning, and from that time colleges increasingly competed with the halls. The colleges had statutes and an endowment to ensure their permanence, whereas the halls depended on the ability and resources of their principals.

In around 1413 the university issued a statute requiring all academics to live in colleges or halls. This was followed by a royal ordinance in 1420 requiring students to swear to obey the university statutes, be governed by a principal and not live in private houses. In about 1440–50 the antiquary John Rous compiled a list of 63 current halls, together with six halls which had closed before his time and six halls which had been replaced by All Souls College. In 1483–90 the university issued the first aularian statutes (from aula, the Latin for "hall") to regulate the halls.

=== Later ===
In 1552 the vice-chancellor of the university, Owen Oglethorpe, took a census of the membership of the colleges and halls of the university. The results for the eight remaining halls were New Inn Hall 49, Hart Hall 45, Broadgates Hall 41, St Alban Hall 38, Magdalen Hall 35, St Mary Hall 23, White Hall 20, and St Edmund Hall 9, a total of 260. By 1842 only five Oxford halls survived, as Gloucester College had become Gloucester Hall, but White Hall, Broadgates, Gloucester and Hart halls had become colleges. Their principals were chosen by the chancellor of the university, except for St Edmund Hall, where the provost of Queen's College made the appointment. In the 19th century the halls were able to offer a less expensive education than the colleges; however this advantage was removed by the admission of unattached students, who could live in lodgings, in 1868 and the opening of Keble in 1870.

In 1877 Prime Minister Disraeli appointed commissioners under Lord Selborne and later Mountague Bernard to consider and implement reform of the university and its colleges. The commissioners came to the view that the four remaining medieval halls were not viable and should merge with colleges on the death or resignation of the incumbent principals. In 1881, the commissioners issued University Statutes which provided for St Alban to merge with Merton, St Mary with Oriel, New Inn with Balliol and for a partial merger of St Edmund with Queen's.

In 1903 only St Edmund Hall remained. Principal Edward Moore wished to retire and become a resident canon in Canterbury Cathedral. Queen's College proposed an amended statute for complete rather than partial merger, which was rejected by Congregation. In 1912 a statute was passed preserving the independence of the hall, which enabled Moore to retire. In 1957 St Edmund Hall became a college, keeping its old name as the last surviving academic hall.

== List of academic halls from 1560 ==
Academic halls from 1560
Name	Established	Closed	Notes
White Hall	13th century	1571	Refounded as Jesus College
Broadgates Hall	1254	1624	Refounded as Pembroke College
Gloucester Hall (on the site of Gloucester College)	1640	1714	Refounded as Worcester College
Hart Hall	1282	1740	Refounded as the first Hertford College
Magdalen Hall	1490	1874	Refounded as the second Hertford College
St Alban Hall	1230	1882	Merged with Merton College
New Inn Hall	1360	1887	Merged with Balliol College, site part of St Peter's College
St Mary Hall	1326	1902	Merged with Oriel College
St Edmund Hall	1278	1957	Incorporated as a College

== See also ==
- Private halls of the University of Oxford
- Permanent private hall

== Sources ==
Books

- Brockliss, L.W.B. (2016). The University of Oxford: A History. Oxford University Press. doi:10.1093/acprof:oso/9780199243563.001.0001. ISBN 9780199243563.
- Emden, Alfred B. (1927). An Oxford Hall in Medieval Times: Being the Early History of St Edmund Hall. Oxford: Clarendon Press.
