= William Henry Charsley =

William Henry Charsley (1820 – 2 November 1900) was an English academic, Master of Charsley's Hall, Oxford from 1862 to 1891.

Born at Beaconsfield in 1820, Charsley matriculated at Christ Church, Oxford, but left after being blinded in an accident. He returned to St Mary Hall, with assistance from his brother Robert Harvey Charsley, and graduated from there to become a well-regarded tutor. He founded Charsley's Hall, a private hall at Oxford, in 1862, continuing as its licensed Master until 1891, when he was succeeded by Charles Abdy Marcon.

The History of the University of Oxford states that

One small establishment, however, filled a niche in the market by receiving idle or incapable students removed from the colleges. For nearly thirty years W. H. Charsley presided over a hall in Parks Road whose members, though few in number, were distinguished for their athletic prowess.

Charsley died at Great Malvern on 2 November 1900. The Oxford Magazine noted that he had "succeeded in founding a Hall and filling it most successfully, and it still flourishes under his successor". In R. W. Hiley's Memories of Half a Century (1899), Charsley is described as "honoured, respected and beloved by all... a fine man in person, of superior mind, a good scholar".
