= William Edward Addis =

Clergyman (1844–1917)

William Edward Addis, also known as Edward Addis and William Addis, (9 May 1844 – 20 February 1917) was a Scottish-born Australian colonial clergyman.

He was born in Edinburgh, Mid-Lothian, Scotland, and was Snell Exhibitioner to Balliol College, Oxford. He matriculated on 12 October 1861, and took a first class in Classical Moderations in 1863, and a first class in the final classical schools in 1865. He took his B.A. degree in 1866, and very shortly afterwards became a convert to the Roman Catholic Church, and a member of the congregation of St. Philip Neri at the Brompton Oratory. He left the Oratory, and became priest in charge of Lower Sydenham. In 1888 he resigned the priesthood, after issuing a circular to his parishioners announcing his abjuration of Roman Catholic doctrines, and was married, at St. John's, Notting Hill, to Miss Mary Rachel Flood. At the end of the year he accepted the post of assistant to the Rev. Charles Strong, of the Australian Church, Melbourne. There was a strained relationship between Addis and Strong, the former was conservative and fond of ceremony. Addis did not seek reappointment and left Australia early in 1893.

Addis was then minister of the High Pavement Chapel (Unitarian), Nottingham, from 1893 to 1898. In 1899 he became professor of Old Testament criticism in Manchester College, Oxford, and in 1900 also Master of Addis Hall, a private hall of the University of Oxford. He left Oxford in 1910 to become Vicar of All Saints, Ennismore Gardens in London.

Addis was the author of Anglicanism and the Fathers, Anglican Misrepresentation, and of the "Catholic Dictionary" (London, 1883) compiled in conjunction with Thomas Arnold,. Mr. Addis has published some articles on Biblical criticism, displaying an acquaintance with the more advanced school of German theologians of his time. He died on 20 February 1917 in Twickenham, London, England.
