= Halifax Fisheries Commission =

International commission to settle British-American fishing dispute

The Halifax Fisheries Commission was a joint international tribunal created by the United Kingdom and the United States in 1877 under Articles 22 and 23 of the Treaty of Washington (1871). The purpose of the Commission was to determine the amount of compensation, if any, to be paid by the United States to the United Kingdom under Article 18 of the Treaty in return for fishing privileges for Americans in the Atlantic waters off Canada and Newfoundland.

== Representatives ==
The Commission was composed of three members. The British government appointed Sir Alexander Tilloch Galt as its representative on the Commission. The United States appointed Ensign H. Kellogg as its representative. The third member and the chair was M. Maurice Delfosse, the Belgian Minister to the United States, who was appointed by the Austro-Hungarian Ambassador to the United Kingdom.

Sir Francis Clare Ford was the agent representing the British government. Dwight Foster was the Agent representing the American government.

Counsel for the British government were:

- Joseph Doutre, Q.C. of Montreal, Quebec;
- Sir R. Thompson, Q.C. of Saint John, New Brunswick;
- Hon. W.V. Whiteway, Q.C., of St. John's, Newfoundland;
- Hon. Louis H. Davies, of Charlottetown, Prince Edward Island;
- R.L. Weatherbe, Q.C., of Halifax, Nova Scotia.

William Henry Trescot and Richard Henry Dana Jr. served as counsel for the United States before the Commission.

== Outcomes ==
On 23 November 1877, the Commission gave its decision. The Commission split 2-1. The majority, composed of Delfosse and Galt, ruled in favour of the United Kingdom and held that the United States was to pay the British government $5,500,000, in gold, as compensation for American fishing rights in British North American waters. The American commissioner, Kellogg, dissented and stated that the treaty conferred greater advantages on the British than those conferred on the Americans. He also questioned whether the commission could render a binding decision unless it was unanimous. Foster, the American agent, then registered a formal protest against the non-unanimous award.

In spite of the dissent by the American commissioner and the protest by the American agent, the United States duly paid the award of $5,500,000 by means of the American Minister to the United Kingdom, John Welsh.

When the treaty was later denounced by the United States, negotiations had to be resumed, and a new treaty was signed in 1888.

The Treaty and the Commission were notable steps in the recognition of Canada as a self-governing dominion within the British Empire. Although the Commission had been formally set up by the United Kingdom and the United States, the British Commissioner and four of the five counsel representing the British government were Canadian, the fifth counsel being a Newfoundlander.
