= Ralph Brecken =

Canadian politician

Speaker of the Legislative Assembly of Prince Edward Island
- In office 1812–1813

Member of the Legislative Assembly of Prince Edward Island
- Constituency: Queens County

Personal details
- Born: 1770 England
- Died: 1813 (aged 42–43)

Ralph Brecken (1770 – July 1, 1813) was a merchant and political figure in Prince Edward Island. He represented Queens County in the Legislative Assembly of Prince Edward Island

He was born in England, the son of John Brecken, an early member of the provincial assembly. Brecken served as speaker for the provincial assembly from 1812 to 1813, was also lieutenant in the county militia and served as a justice of the peace. Brecken married Matilda, the daughter of Joseph Robinson.

His son John also served in the provincial assembly and his grandson Frederick de St Croix Brecken was a member of the assembly and also served in the Canadian House of Commons.

Several of his daughters married members of the Legislative Council:

- Jane Rebecca married Thomas Heath Haviland
- Anna Matilda married Donald McDonald
- Barbara Leila Alice married James Ellis Peake
