= John Ball (Puritan) =

John Ball (October 1585 – 20 October 1640) was an English puritan divine.

== Life ==
He was born in Cassington, Oxfordshire.

After taking his BA degree from St Mary Hall, Oxford, in 1608, he went into Cheshire to act as tutor to the children of Lady Cholmondeley. He adopted Puritan views, and after being ordained without subscription, was appointed to the small curacy of Whitmore in Staffordshire. He was soon deprived by John Bridgeman, the high church bishop of Chester, who put him to much suffering.

He became a schoolmaster and earned a wide and high reputation for his scholarship and piety. He died on 20 October 1640.

== Works ==
The most popular of his numerous works was A Short Catechisme, containing all the Principal Grounds of Religion (14 editions before 1632). His Treatise of Faith (1632), and Friendly Trial of the Grounds tending to Separation (1640), the latter of which defines his position with regard to the church, are also valuable. His A Tryall of the New-Church Way in New-England and Old, written in 1637 but published in 1644, was a reply to the responses of the New England puritans to nine questions which he had posed to them concerning the constitution and doctrine of their churches. His Treatise of the Covenant of Grace (1645) was also published posthumously.

== Works reprinted ==
- A Treatise of the Covenant of Grace (1645) ISBN 1-84685-278-1
