= Charles Abdy Marcon =

English clergyman (1853–1953)

Charles Abdy Marcon (22 September 1853 – 7 February 1953) was an English clergyman, Master of Marcon's Hall, a private hall of Oxford University, from 1891 to 1918, then from 1918 Vicar of Kennington in south London.

== Early life ==
Marcon was the third son of the Rev. Walter Marcon, Rector of Edgefield, Norfolk, a first-class cricketer who in his youth had played for Eton and Oxford. Born at Edgefield, he was educated at Gresham's School, Holt, and Charsley's Hall, Oxford, matriculating on 14 January 1874 at the age of twenty and graduating BA in 1878, MA in 1882.

== Career ==
Marcon was ordained a deacon of the Church of England in 1886 and served as curate of South Hinksey, Berkshire, from 1886 until 1899. In 1891 he took over as Master of Charsley's Hall, Oxford from William Henry Charsley, reopening it as Marcon's Hall in 1892. He remained as Master until 1918.

In 1892 Marcon was admitted as a senior member of St Mary Hall and was ordained a priest in 1895. In 1903 he was elected to Oriel and in 1909 was appointed as chaplain of H. M. Prison Oxford.

On giving up Marcon's Hall in 1918 he took up a Church of England benefice as Vicar of Kennington.

== Private life ==
On 18 September 1884, at St Philip's Church, Norwich, Marcon married Sophia Wyndham Winter, the elder daughter of J. J. Winter JP of Heigham House, Norwich, and they had one son, Charles Sholto Wyndham Marcon (1890–1959), and two daughters, including Constance Margaret Marcon. Their son, known as Sholto Marcon, was an international hockey player who won an Olympic Gold medal representing Great Britain at the 1920 Summer Olympics.

In Who's Who Marcon gave his recreations as golf, hockey, lawn tennis, and bicycling.

On 18 September 1934, Mr and Mrs Charles Abdy Marcon celebrated their golden wedding anniversary. They were then living at 256, Iffley Road, Oxford.

In 1947 Marcon attended a luncheon in Oxford to inaugurate the Friends of Pusey House and was welcomed by the Principal of Pusey House as one who had known Dr Edward Pusey (1800–1882).

== Selected publications ==
- Oxford Questions in Arithmetic and Algebra (ed.)
