= Queen's County (electoral district) =

Former federal electoral district in Prince Edward Island, Canada

Prince Edward Island electoral district

Defunct federal electoral district
- Legislature: House of Commons
- District created: 1873
- District abolished: 1892
- First contested: By-election 1873
- Last contested: 1891

Queen's County was a federal electoral district in Prince Edward Island, Canada, that was represented in the House of Commons of Canada from 1873 to 1896. This riding was created in 1873 when Prince Edward Island joined the Canadian Confederation. It was abolished in 1892 when it was redistributed into East Prince, East Queen's and West Queen's ridings. In 1904 the two-seat riding of Queen's was created.

The riding of Queen's County consisted of Queen's County, and elected two members.

== Election results ==
Canadian federal by-election, 29 September 1873
Party	Candidate	Votes	Elected
Liberal	David Laird	acclaimed	X
Liberal	Peter Sinclair	acclaimed	X

Canadian federal by-election, 3 December 1873
Party	Candidate	Votes	Elected
Liberal	David Laird	acclaimed	X
Called upon Mr. Laird being appointed Minister of the Interior, 7 November 1873

1874 Canadian federal election
Party	Candidate	Votes	Elected
Liberal	David Laird	acclaimed	X
Liberal	Peter Sinclair	acclaimed	X

Canadian federal by-election, 22 November 1876
Party	Candidate	Votes
Conservative	James Colledge Pope	3,199
Unknown	William Welsh	3,111
Called upon Mr. Laird being appointed Lieutenant-Governor of the North West Territories, 7 October 1876

1878 Canadian federal election
Party	Candidate	Votes	Elected
Conservative	James Colledge Pope	3,275	X
Conservative	Frederick de Sainte-Croix Brecken	3,102	X
Liberal	Peter Sinclair	2,392	
Unknown	Mr. McGill	2,272	

Canadian federal by-election, 9 November 1878
Party	Candidate	Votes
Conservative	James Colledge Pope	acclaimed
Called upon Mr. Pope being appointed Minister of Marine and Fisheries, 19 October 1878

1882 Canadian federal election
Party	Candidate	Votes	Elected
Liberal	Louis Henry Davies	3,164	X
Liberal–Conservative	John Theophilus Jenkins	3,122	X
Conservative	Frederick de Sainte-Croix Brecken	3,120	
Unknown	D. Laird	2,759	

Canadian federal by-election, 27 February 1883
Party	Candidate	Votes
Conservative	Frederick de Sainte-Croix Brecken	acclaimed
Called upon Mr. Jenkins' election being declared void, the seat was adjudicated to Mr. Brecken.

Canadian federal by-election, 19 August 1884
Party	Candidate	Votes
Liberal–Conservative	John Theophilus Jenkins	3,428
Unknown	William Welsh	3,388
On Mr. Brecken being appointed Postmaster of Charlottetown, August 1884

1887 Canadian federal election
Party	Candidate	Votes	Elected
Liberal	Louis Henry Davies	4,382	X
Independent Liberal	William Welsh	4,314	X
Conservative	Donald Ferguson	3,599	
Conservative	William Campbell	3,430	

1891 Canadian federal election
Party	Candidate	Votes	Elected
Liberal	Louis Henry Davies	4,006	X
Independent Liberal	William Welsh	3,854	X
Conservative	Patrick Blake	3,669	
Conservative	Donald Ferguson	3,521	

== See also ==
- List of Canadian electoral districts
- Historical federal electoral districts of Canada
