= Edward Smith (cricketer, born 1854) =

English cricketer, clergyman

Personal information
- Full name: Edward Paske Smith
- Born: 9 September 1854; Mussoorie, United Provinces, British India
- Died: 2 January 1909 (aged 54); Seaford, Sussex, England
- Batting: Right-handed
- Bowling: Right-arm medium

Domestic team information
- Years: Team
- 1876: Oxford University

Career statistics
Competition	First-class
Matches	1
Runs scored	6
Batting average	3.00
100s/50s	–/–
Top score	6
Balls bowled	152
Wickets	3
Bowling average	14.00
5 wickets in innings	–
10 wickets in match	–
Best bowling	2/24
Catches/stumpings	–/–
- Source: Cricinfo, 14 April 2020

Edward Paske Smith (9 September 1854 – 2 January 1909) was an English first-class cricketer and clergyman.

The son of Wemyss Smith, he was born in British India at Mussoorie in September 1854. He was educated at Sherborne School, before going up to St Alban Hall, Oxford. While studying at Oxford, he made a single appearance in first-class cricket for Oxford University against the Marylebone Cricket Club (MCC) at Oxford in 1876. Batting twice in the match, he was dismissed without scoring in the Oxford first innings by Alfred Shaw, while in their second innings he was dismissed for 6 runs by William Mycroft. With the ball, he took the wickets of A. N. Hornby and Arthur Ridley in the MCC first innings, in addition to taking the wicket of Hornby in their second innings to finish with match figures of 3 for 42.

After graduating from Oxford, he took holy orders in the Church of England. His first ecclesiastical post was as curate of Bermondsey from 1879–84, before undertaking missionary work at Calgary for four years from 1884. He chaplain to Cyprian Pinkham, the Archbishop of Saskatchewan in 1887–88. Smith was made a 4th Class Chaplain to the Forces in January 1890, a post he held until he resigned his commission in April 1898. In 1898, he became the vicar of Newton-on-Ouse in North Yorkshire, a position he retained until his death in January 1909, which occurred on the south coast of England at Seaford, Sussex.
