= St Mary Hall, Oxford =

Former hall of the University of Oxford

St Mary Hall
- University of Oxford
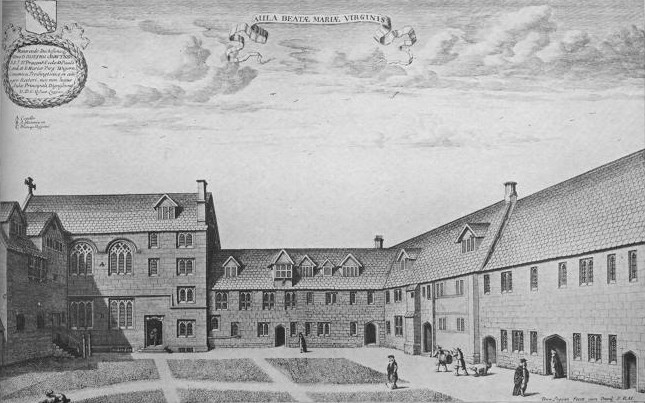
- Location: High Street
- Coordinates: 51.7522°N 1.2536°W
- Latin name: Aula Beatae Mariae Virginis
- Established: 1326 (as part of Oriel College); 1545 (as an independent hall)
- Closed: 1902 (incorporated into Oriel College)
- Named for: Church of St Mary the Virgin
- Principal: see below

Map
- Location within Oxford city centre

St Mary Hall was a medieval academic hall of the University of Oxford. It was associated with Oriel College from 1326 to 1545, but functioned independently from 1545 until it was re-incorporated into Oriel College in 1902.

== History ==
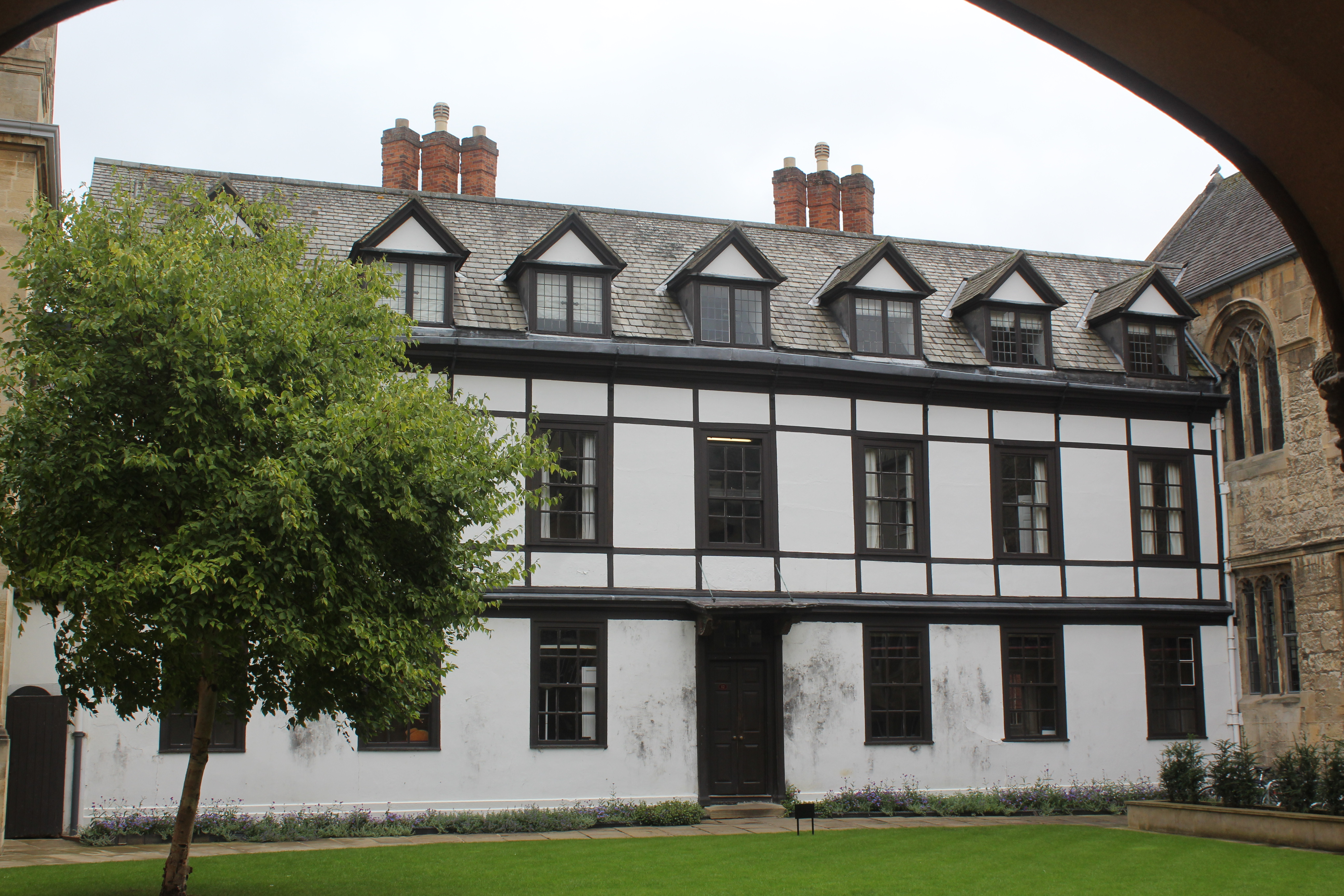
"The dolls house", a surviving 1743 building of St Mary's Hall, abutting the 1640 chapel and hall on the right

In 1320, when he was appointed rector of the Church of St Mary the Virgin, Adam de Brome was given the rectory house, St. Mary Hall, on the High Street. St. Mary Hall was acquired by Oriel College in 1326: Bedel Hall, which adjoins St. Mary's to the south, was given by Bishop Carpenter of Worcester in 1455. These two halls, along with St. Martin's Hall, served as annexes for Oriel College.

In the early 16th century, the college's St. Antony's and Dudley exhibitioners were lodged in St Mary Hall and Bedel Hall, and around this time the two halls were united. St. Mary Hall subsequently developed into an independent entity, and in 1545, on the order the Visitor, Bishop Longland of Lincoln, the door between St Mary Hall and Oriel was blocked. The Hall subsequently employed its own lecturers, and the intake of St Mary's was periodically more than that of Oriel.

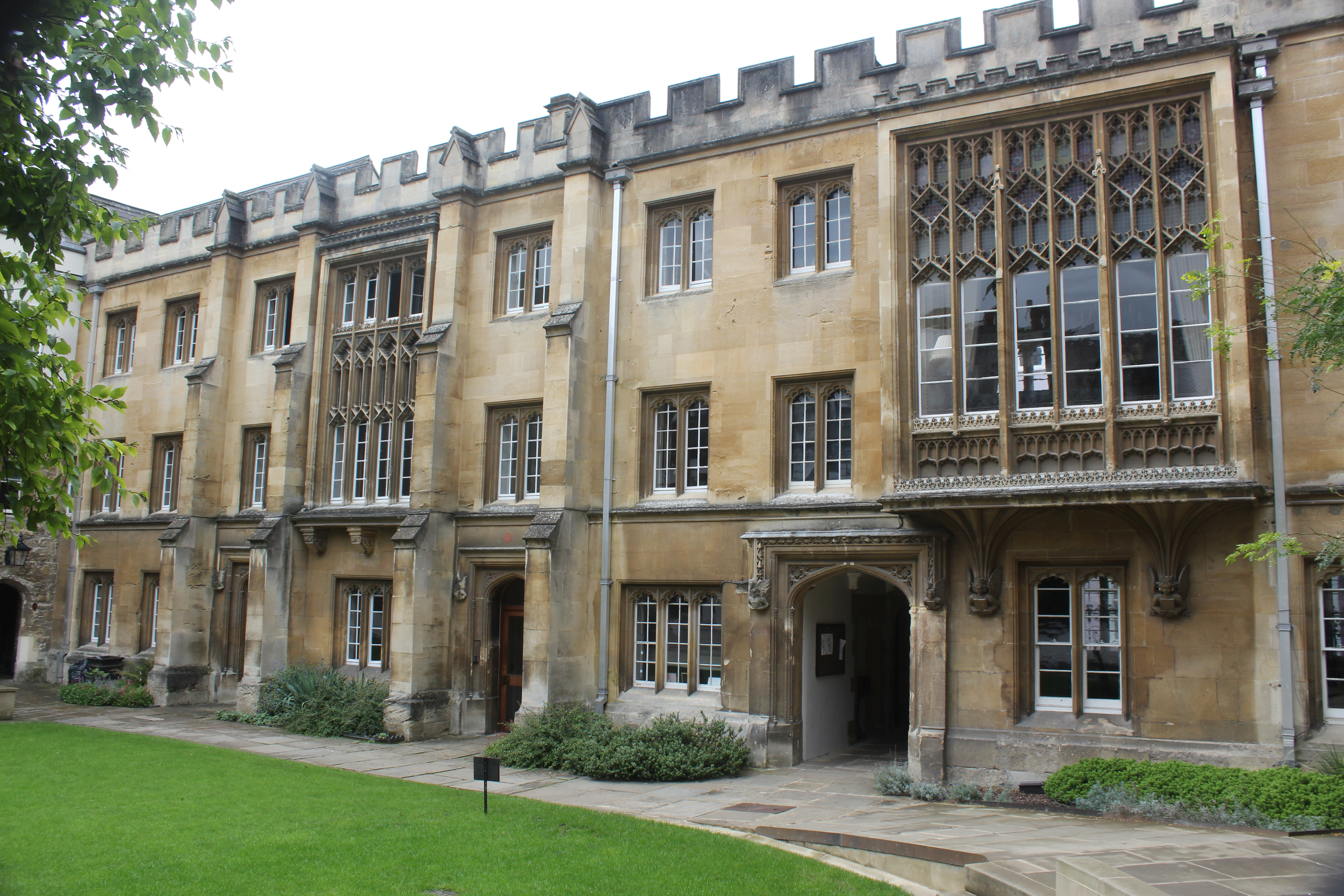
1826 Gothic Revival building on the west side of St Mary's Hall, incorporating the old gate

In 1552, there were 18 members of St. Mary Hall, excluding the Principal. The Principals of St Mary Hall continued to be fellows of Oriel until 1656. By 1875, the size of St.Mary Hall's undergraduate body had risen to 60, a large number for one of the University's colleges at that time.

The Hall was effectively the property of its Principal, who was also Vicar of St Mary's Church. The last Principal, Drummond Percy Chase, who had been appointed in 1857, created an agreement with Oriel as a consequence of which the Hall became the property of Oriel on his death, which subsequently occurred in 1902, when according to the agreement, the Hall was incorporated into Oriel College. Some agreements created when St. Mary Hall were a separate organisation continue to exist: for example, the benefice of the Vicar of St Mary's Church includes dining rights at Oriel.

The present St. Mary's Quad, or 'third quadrangle', of Oriel occupies three ranges of the former buildings of the St. Mary Hall. The Principal's house was demolished for the construction of the Rhodes Building, which was designed by Basil Champneys, and which was completed in 1911.

== Principals ==
- Adam de Brome
- 1532–1537: John Rixman
- 1546–1550: Morgan Phillips
- 1556–1561: William Allen, later a Cardinal
- 1656–1660: Thomas Cole
- 1660–1664: Martin Llewellin (1616-1681/82)
- 1664–1689: Joseph Crowther (died 1689), also Chaplain to the Duke of York
- 1689–1712: William Wyatt (died Nov. 1712)
- 1712–1719: John Hudson
- 1719–1764: William King
- 1764–1801: Thomas Nowell
- 1801–1815: Phineas Pett
- 1815–1833: John Dean (born 1769, died 1833)
- 1833–1848: Renn Dickson Hampden
- 1848–1857: Philip Bliss (born 1787, died 1857)
- 1857–1902: Drummond Percy Chase (born 1820, died 1902)

== Notable former students ==
- John Ball (Puritan), BA 1608
- William Henry Charsley, Master of Charsley's Hall, Oxford
- Edward Craggs-Eliot, 1st Baron Eliot, matriculated 1742
- Brajendranath Dey, of the Indian Civil Service, matriculated 1874
- Thomas Elyot (alleged)
- Thomas Harriot, 16th-century astronomer, mathematician, ethnographer, and translator
- Theodore Hook, matriculated but did not come into residence; author
- Robert Hues, B.A. 1578
- John Hunter, matriculated 1755
- Sir Christopher Hatton, lord chancellor of England
- James Leith Moody, priest (BA, 1840; MA, 1863)
- Henry Newton, diplomat
- Geoffrey Osbaldeston, High Court judge in Ireland, matriculated 1575
- Robert Parsons, leading Jesuit priest
- George Sandys
- John Marston (poet)

Thomas Jackson Rev 1812– 1886 graduated BA 1834 and MA 1837
