= Stephen Rice Jenkins =

Canadian physician

Stephen Rice Jenkins (November 12, 1858 – September 15, 1929) was a physician and political figure in Prince Edward Island, Canada. He represented 5th Queens in the Legislative Assembly of Prince Edward Island from 1912 to 1919 as a Conservative member.

He was born in Charlottetown, the son of John Theophilus Jenkins and Jessica Esther Rice, and was educated there and at King's College in Windsor, Nova Scotia. Jenkins went on to study medicine at the University of Pennsylvania and practiced at the Blockley hospital in Philadelphia. He returned to the island in 1885, practicing at Tignish and then Cardigan before moving to Charlottetown in 1888. In 1886, he married Ellen Josephine Sweeney. Raised as an Anglican, Jenkins became a Roman Catholic before his marriage. He was named a surgeon for the militia, eventually becoming an honorary lieutenant-colonel for his unit. He ran unsuccessfully for a seat in the provincial assembly in 1900 before being elected in 1912. He served as a minister without portfolio in the provincial cabinet.

Jenkins was a member of the Canadian Army Medical Corps during World War I. He later helped establish a veteran's hospital at Charlottetown. Jenkins was senior surgeon at Prince Edward Island Hospital and chief of staff at Charlottetown Hospital. He served as president for the Maritime Medical Association and was president for the Canadian Medical Association in 1928 and 1929. He helped establish the Prince Edward Island Red Cross Society and served as its secretary. He was also president of the Anti-Tuberculosis Society and chair of the provincial branch of the American Society for the Control of Cancer. Jenkins also served on the Charlottetown school board. He died of pneumonia in Charlottetown in 1929.

His brother Louis also served in the provincial assembly.
