= Henry Robinson (clergyman) =

Henry Robinson (1819 – 4 January 1887) was a Church of England clergyman, schoolmaster of Christ's Hospital, and Rector of Kilkhampton, Cornwall.

He was the second son of William Robinson, gentleman, of St Leonard's, London, and was educated at St Alban Hall, Oxford, where he matriculated on 25 October 1838, aged nineteen. There were then only seven members of the Hall, and only one tutor. He graduated BA in 1842 and proceeded to MA by seniority in 1852.

Robinson was a master of Christ's Hospital from 1849 to 1857, when he was appointed as Rector of Kilkhampton. Between 1859 and 1872, he held benefices in Northumberland and County Durham, and in 1862 incorporated as a Master of Arts of the University of Durham. He graduated as a Bachelor and Doctor of Divinity in 1871.

In 1882, St Alban Hall was extinguished and merged into Merton College, Oxford, which demolished its buildings. Robinson wrote a memoir of his alma mater, published in London Society in January 1887, in which he remembered the Hall fondly and cast some blame on the chancellor of the university, Lord Salisbury, for its closure:

"St Alban Hall is destroyed because it has no friends. No one is interested in it except the principal, and he has been pensioned off... I am sure its extinction was not called for, but there was no one to speak up for it. The Chancellor of the University is the Visitor of all the halls, and he holds his place in trust for his successor."

Robinson died a few days after his article was published.
