= Donald Ferguson (politician) =

Canadian politician

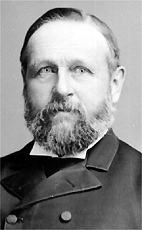
Hon. Donald Ferguson

Donald Ferguson, PC (7 March 1839 – 3 September 1909) was a Canadian politician.

Born in Marshfield, Prince Edward Island, originally a livestock farmer, Ferguson spent much of his life in public service; from 1872–1873 he served as a justice of the peace, resigning that position in prior to his first of unsuccessful bid for a position on the PEI Legislative Council. He also failed in his bid for a Legislative Council seat in 1874, and for a seat as a Conservative in the Prince Edward Island House of Assembly in 1876. However, in 1878 he finally succeeded in winning, by acclamation, a seat in the House, a position he defended for twelve years until his resignation in October 1890. During this twelve-year period he served variously as commissioner of public works, provincial secretary, treasurer, and Commissioner of Crown Lands.

Ferguson also hoped to become a Member of Parliament in the House of Commons of Canada, but was defeated in the Canadian federal election of 1887 and again in 1891 when he stood as member for the electoral district of Queen's County. However, on 4 September 1893, he was appointed to the Senate of Canada on the recommendation of John Sparrow David Thompson. He became influential in federal politics, and in January 1895 was appointed Minister without portfolio in the cabinet of Sir Mackenzie Bowell's government. From 6 January 1896 – 14 January 1896, Ferguson also functioned as the acting Minister of Agriculture. Ferguson served representing the senatorial division of Queen's, Prince Edward Island until his death in 1909.

A son was the classicist William Scott Ferguson.

1887 Canadian federal election: Queen's County
Party	Candidate	Votes	Elected
Liberal	Louis Henry Davies	4,382	X
Independent Liberal	William Welsh	4,314	X
Conservative	Donald Ferguson	3,599	
Conservative	William Campbell	3,430	

1891 Canadian federal election: Queen's County
Party	Candidate	Votes	Elected
Liberal	Louis Henry Davies	4,006	X
Independent Liberal	William Welsh	3,854	X
Conservative	Patrick Blake	3,669	
Conservative	Donald Ferguson	3,521	
