= St Alban Hall, Oxford =

Former hall of the University of Oxford

St Alban Hall
- University of Oxford
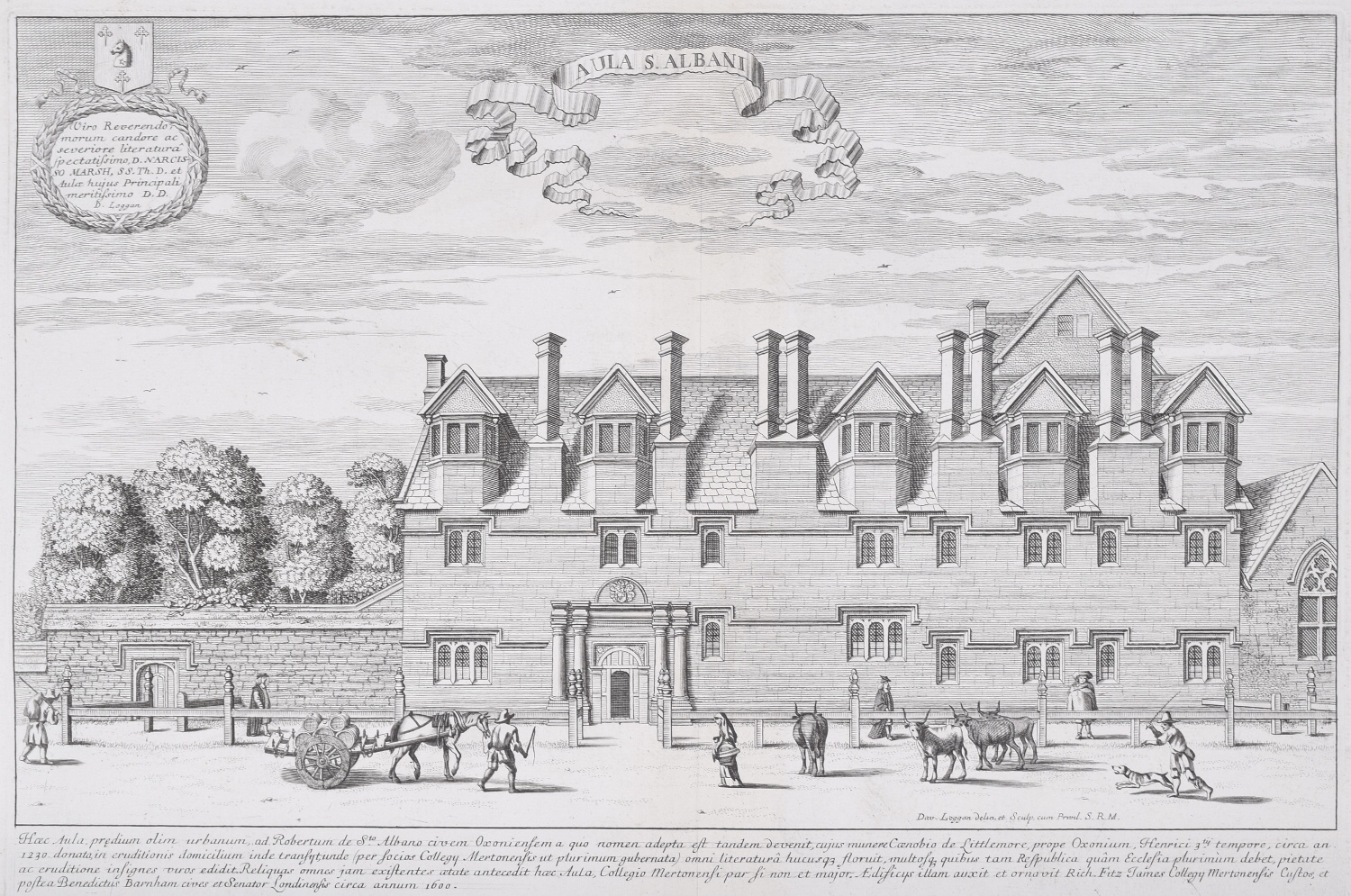
- St Alban Hall in 1675, by David Loggan
- Location: Merton Street
- Coordinates: 51.7512°N 1.2513°W
- Latin name: Aula Sancti Albani
- Established: c. 1230
- Closed: 1882 (incorporated into Merton College)
- Named for: Robert of Saint Alban
- Principal: See below

Map
- Location within Oxford city centre

St Alban Hall, sometimes known as St Alban's Hall or Stubbins, was one of the medieval halls of the University of Oxford, and one of the longest-surviving. It was established in the 13th century, acquired by neighbouring Merton College in the 16th century but operated separately until the institutions merged in the late 19th century. The site in Merton Street, Oxford, is now occupied by Merton's Edwardian St Alban's Quad.

== History ==
St Alban Hall took its name from Robert of Saint Alban, a citizen of Oxford, who conveyed the property to the priory of nuns at Littlemore, near Oxford, about the year 1230.

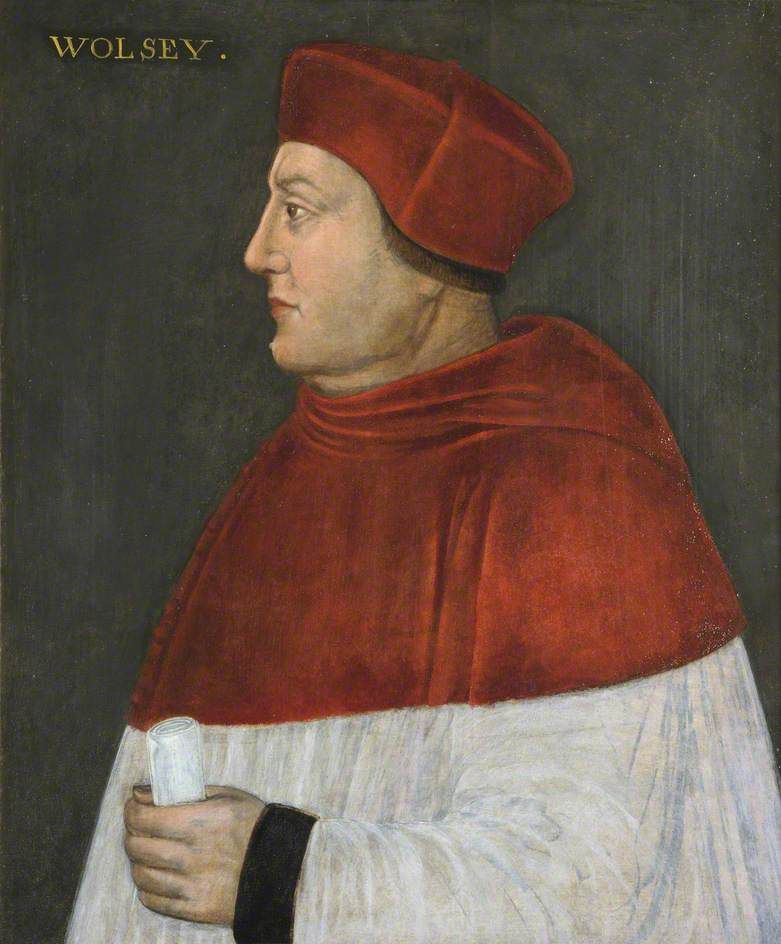
Cardinal Wolsey

In February 1525, on the recommendation of Thomas Wolsey, Lord Chancellor, as a result of the Littlemore Priory scandals, the priory was dissolved. Its lands and houses in Oxford passed to Wolsey for the use of his new Cardinal College. When Wolsey fell from power in 1529, Littlemore Priory, along with the rest of his wealth and estates, escheated to the Crown. Henry VIII then granted St Alban Hall to George Owen, D.M., who was both the king's physician and a Fellow of Merton College. Owen conveyed it to Sir John Williams, later Lord Williams of Thame, and Sir John Gresham. By permission of Edward VI, in 1547 they transferred the Hall to John Pollard and Robert Perrot, Esquires, who sold it to the Warden and Fellows of Merton College.

St Alban Hall continued for another three centuries as a separate hall with its own students and principal. It was governed by the university's statutes for Academical Halls, and its principal was chosen by the chancellor of the university.

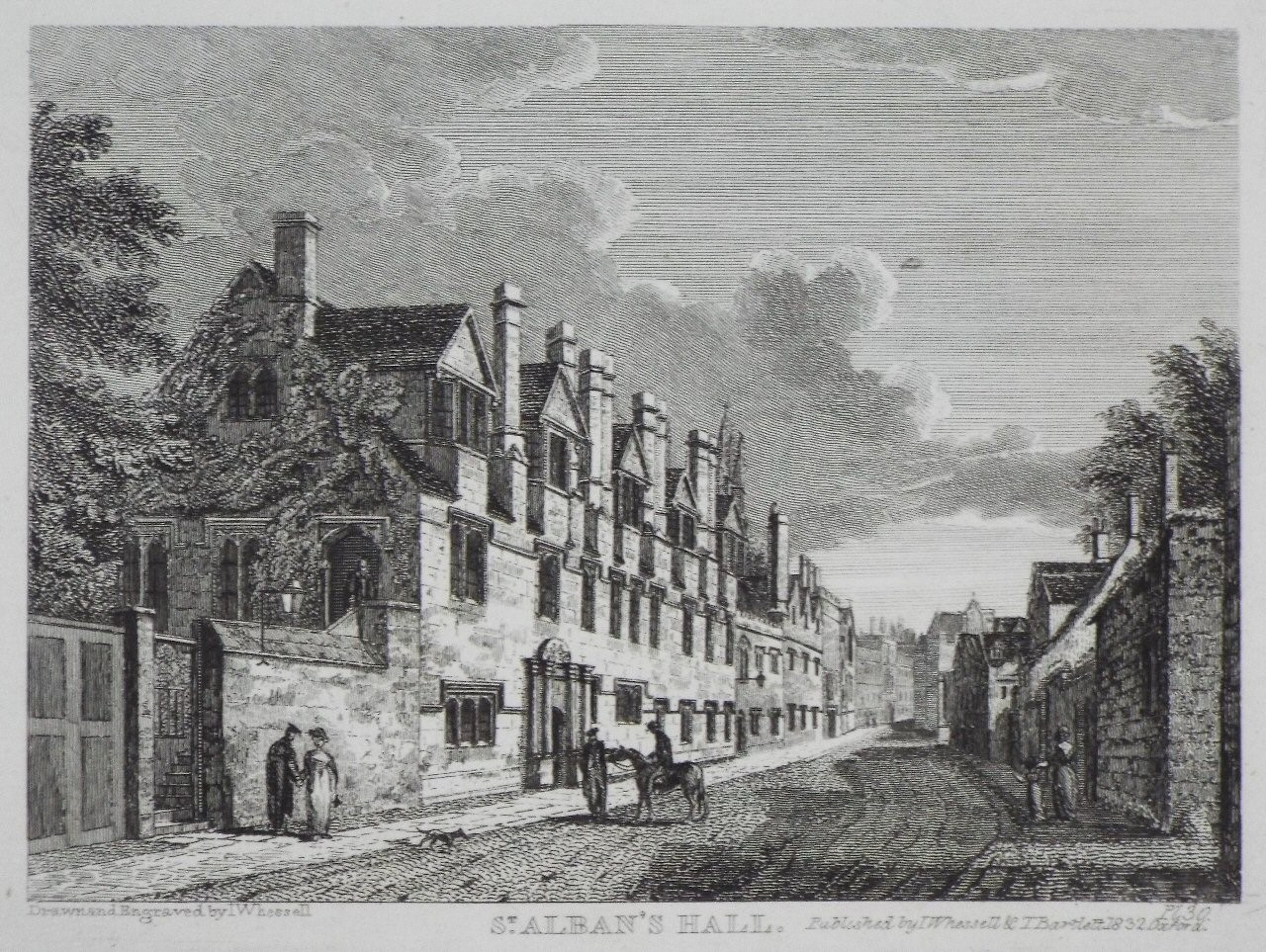
St Alban Hall in 1832

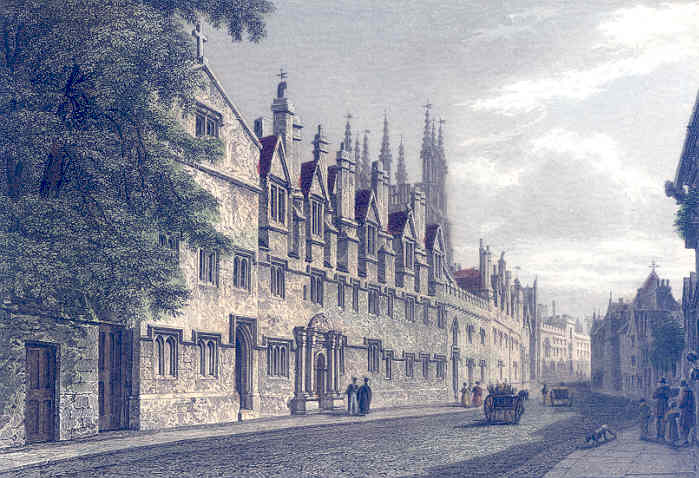
A view of the Hall in 1837

Chancellor Grenville appointed Richard Whately as principal in 1825, in an attempt to raise standards there. John Henry Newman was Whately's vice-principal from 1825 to 1826, and Samuel Hinds from 1827 to 1831.

As later recalled by Dr Henry Robinson, in the mid-1830s there was only one undergraduate, John Robert Tennant, who was known as "the solitary tenant of Alban Hall". There were seven members when Robinson arrived in 1838, rising to twelve by the time he came down. The only tutor was the vice-principal, while the principal, Edward Cardwell, was a university lecturer on divinity. Those aiming for an honours degree took a private tutor, of whom Bob Lowe of Magdalen was the most popular. The Hall then had four servants, a cook, a manciple, a porter, and a boy. Robinson had found St Alban Hall "rather an expensive place, the number being so few, and there was no endowment."

The last principal, William Salter, was appointed in 1861 and resigned in 1882. In 1877 Prime Minister Benjamin Disraeli appointed commissioners under Lord Selborne and later Mountague Bernard to consider and implement reform of the university and its colleges. The commissioners came to the view that the four remaining medieval halls were not viable and should merge with colleges. In 1881, the commissioners made a University Statute which provided for St Alban Hall to be united with Merton College in the event of Principal Salter's resignation or death. The Hall then had eighteen members in residence, who were admitted to Merton. In 1887, a similar Statute extinguished New Inn Hall and combined it with Balliol College, on the death of Henry Hubert Cornish. In the event, of the halls only St Edmund Hall would avoid merger.

Henry Robinson cast some of the blame for the end of the Hall on Lord Salisbury, the university's chancellor:

"St Alban Hall is destroyed because it has no friends. No one is interested in it except the principal, and he has been pensioned off... I am sure its extinction was not called for, but there was no one to speak up for it. The Chancellor of the University is the Visitor of all the halls, and he holds his place in trust for his successor."

Robinson died a few days after his article was published.

== Buildings ==
St Alban Hall's buildings included a main quadrangle and a smaller court. The Merton Street front of the quad was rebuilt in 1600, funded by Benedict Barnham. The buildings were reconstructed again and a chapel added by John Gibbs from 1863, funded by Principal Salter. After 1882 the chapel was no longer needed and was secularized. Between 1904 and 1910 the buildings of the former hall were demolished, apart from part of their front elevation on Merton Street, and the St Alban's Quadrangle of Merton College built on the site.

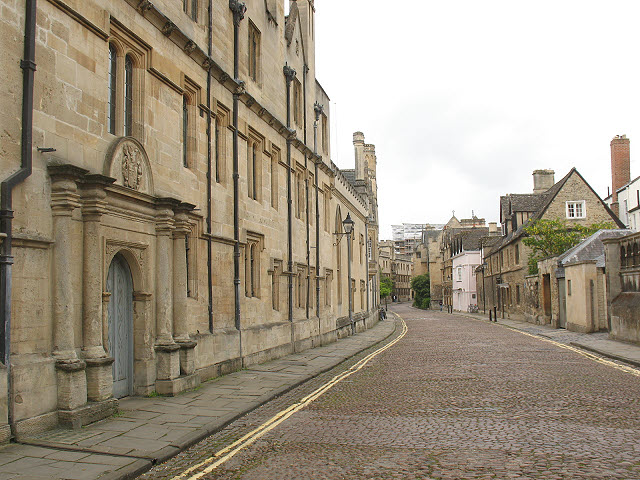
Surviving front elevation on Merton Street

== Principals ==
A list of the principals of St Alban Hall.

- 1437: Roger Martin
- 1439: Robert Ashe
- 1444: John Gygur
- 1450: William Shyrefe
- 1452: William Romsey
- 1468–1477: Thomas Danett
- 1477: Richard FitzJames, later Bishop of London
- Thomas Lynley
- Robert Gosbourne
- Ralph Hamsterley
- 1501: Hugh Saunders, alias Shakspeere
- 1503: John Forster
- 1507: John Beverstone
- 1507: William Bysse
- 1509: Richard Walker
- 1510: John Pokyswell
- 1514: John Hoper
- Simon Balle
- 1527: Walter Buckler
- 1530: Robert Tailer
- 1532: William Pedyll
- 1535: Robert Huyck
- 1536: Richard Smyth, also first Regius Professor of Divinity at Oxford
- 1539: Humphrey Burneford
- 1543: John Estwyck
- 1547: William Marshall
- 1567: Arthur Atye
- Richard Radclyffe

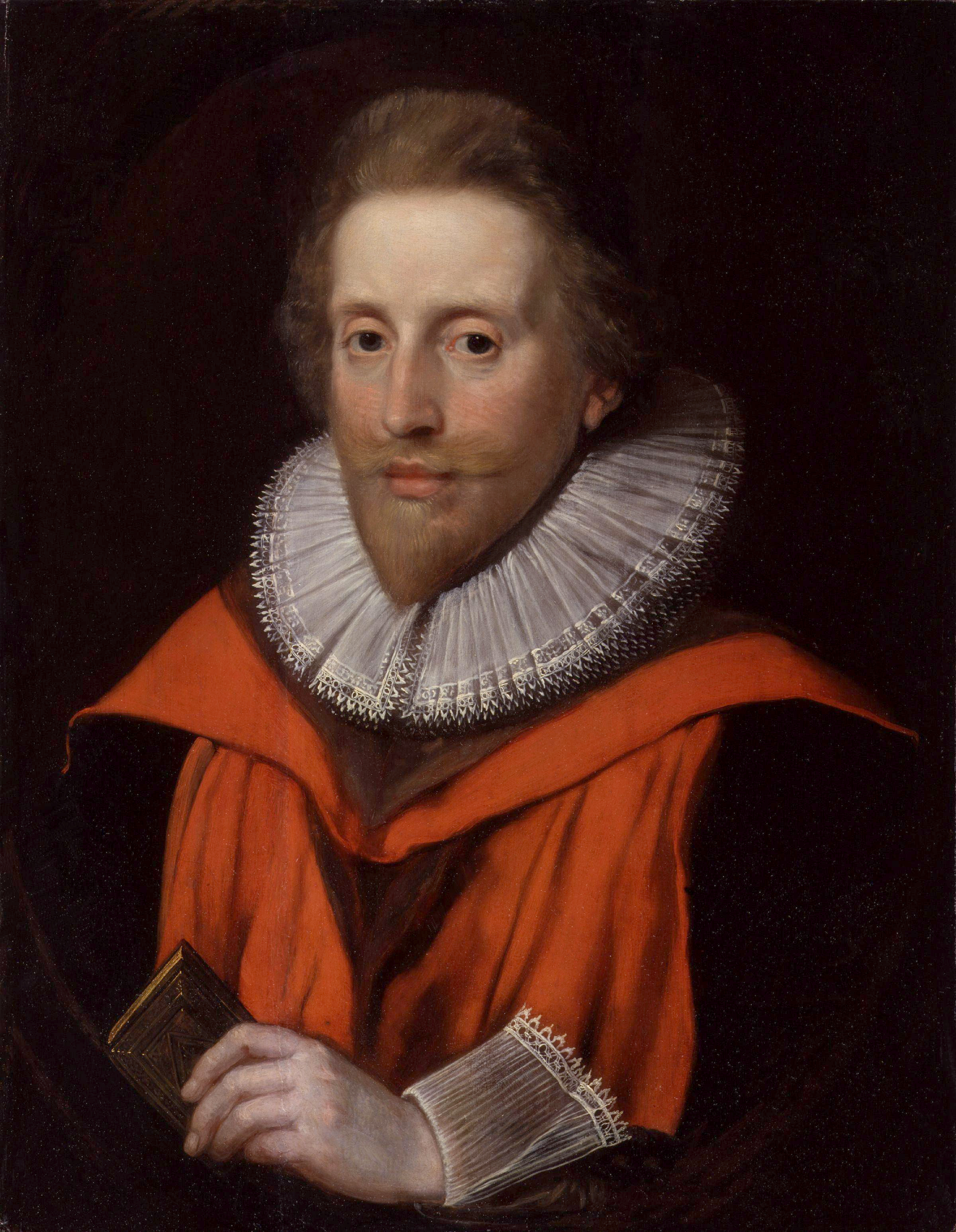
Richard Zouch

- 1599: Robert Masters
- 1603: Henry Masters
- 1614: Anthony Morgan
- 1621: Richard Parker
- 1624: Edward Chaloner
- 1625–1661: Richard Zouch
- 1641: Sir Giles Sweit
- 1664–1673: Thomas Lamplugh
- 1673–1679: Narcissus Marsh
- 1679–1723: Thomas Bouchier
- 1692: Richard Duckworth (Note: Some sources state that Duckworth was vice-principal.)
- 1723–1736: James Bouchier
- 1736: Robert Leyborne
- 1759: Francis Randolph

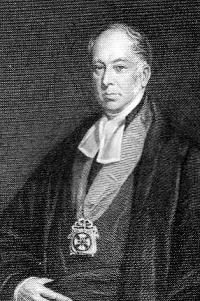
Richard Whately

- 1797–1823: Thomas Winstanley
- 1823–1825: Peter Elmsley
- 1825–1831: Richard Whately, later Archbishop of Dublin
- 1831–1861: Edward Cardwell
- 1861–1882: William Charles Salter

== Notable alumni ==
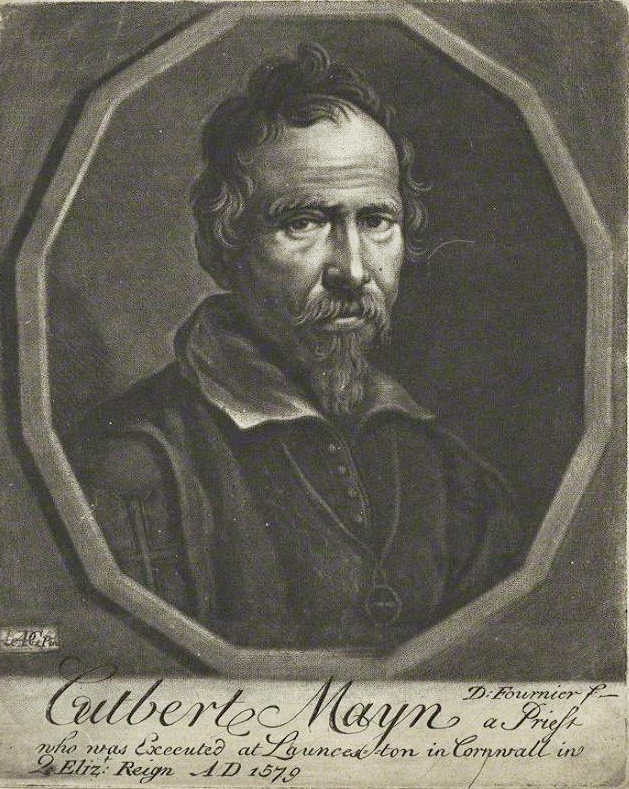
Cuthbert Mayne

- Cuthbert Mayne (c. 1543–1577), Roman Catholic priest executed in the time of Elizabeth I
- Sir Thomas Gresham (died 1630), landowner and member of parliament
- Robert Harcourt (died 1631), explorer
- Thomas Crompton (died 1608), a barrister and judge
- Thomas Lawton (c. 1558–1606), a barrister and judge
- John Penry (1563–1593), Welsh Protestant martyr
- Matthew Slade (1569–1628), nonconformist minister
- Gervase Clifton, 1st Baron Clifton (c. 1570–1618), landowner and peer
- Edward Lapworth (1574–1636), physician and Latin poet
- Philip Massinger (1583–1640), dramatist
- William Lenthall (1591–1662), Speaker of the House of Commons,
- Samuel Turner (c. 1582–1647), Cavalier soldier
- Sir Richard Browne, 1st Baronet, of Deptford (died 1683), English ambassador to France
- Richard Alleine (1610/11–1681), Puritan divine
- William Alleine (1614–1677), clergyman,
- Bartholomew Ashwood (1622–1680), puritan divine
- John Durel (1625–1683), clergyman
- Thomas Hancorne (1642–1731), clergyman
- Francis Willis (1718–1807), physician
- John Evans (1756–1846), Welsh surgeon and cartographer
- Stephen Reay (1782–1861), Laudian Professor of Arabic
- Nathaniel Dawes (1843–1910), Anglican bishop in Australia
- Edward Smith (1854–1908), clergyman and first class cricketer
