= Edward Cardwell =

English theologian

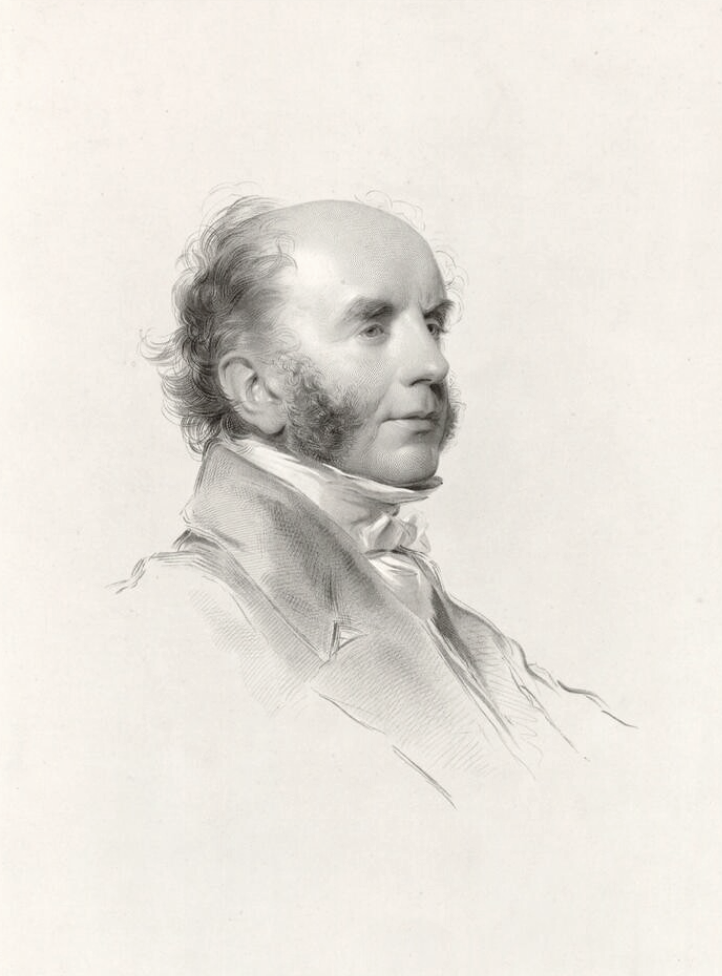
Edward Cardwell

Edward Cardwell (1787 – 23 May 1861) was an English theologian also noted for his contributions to the study of English church history. In addition to his scholarly work, he filled various administrative positions in the University of Oxford.

== Life ==
Cardwell was born at Blackburn in Lancashire. He was educated at Brasenose College, Oxford (B.A. 1809; M.A. 1812; B.D. 1819; D.D. 1831), and after being for several years tutor and lecturer, was appointed, in 1814, one of the examiners to the university.

In 1825, Cardwell was chosen Camden Professor of Ancient History and held the chair for 35 years, the longest of any occupant to date. In 1831, he succeeded Archbishop Whately as principal of St Alban Hall (later merged with Merton College).

Cardwell was one of the best men of business in the university, and held various important posts, among which were those of delegate of the press, curator of the university galleries, manager of the Bible department of the press, and private secretary to successive chancellors of the university. He established the Wolvercote paper mill.

Cardwell died at Oxford on 23 May 1861.

== Works ==
Cardwell's major works were in the field of English church history. He planned an extensive work on the entire synodical history of the church in England, which was to be based on David Wilkins's Concilia Magnae Britanniae et Hiberniae. He carried out some portions only. The first published was Documentary Annals of the Reformed Church of England from 1546 to 1716, which appeared in 1839.

It was followed by a History of Conferences, etc., connected with the Revision of the Book of Common Prayer (1840). On 1842 appeared Synodalia, a Collection of Articles of Religion, Canons, and Proceedings of Convocation from 1547 to 1717, completing the series for that period. Closely connected with these works is the Reformatio Legum Ecclesiasticarum (1850), which treats of the efforts for reform during the reigns of Henry VIII, Edward VI, and Elizabeth I.

During his tenure as Camden Professor, Cardwell published editions of the "Ethics" of Aristotle (Oxford, 1828) and his course of Lectures on the Coinage of the Greeks and Romans (Oxford, 1832). He published in 1837 a students' edition of the Greek Testament, and an edition of the Greek and Latin texts of the History of the Jewish War, by Josephus, with illustrative notes.

Cardwell also published in 1854 a new edition of Bishop Gibson's Synodus Anglicana.
