= Louis Jenkins (politician) =

Canadian politician

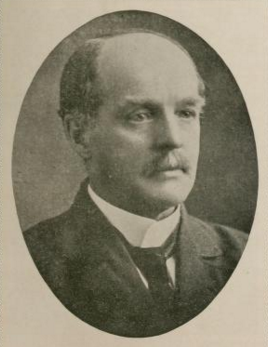
Louis Leoline Jenkins

Louis Leoline Jenkins (September 3, 1860 – August 24, 1939) was a farmer and political figure on Prince Edward Island. He represented 2nd Queens in the Legislative Assembly of Prince Edward Island from 1912 to 1915 and from 1924 to 1927 as a Conservative.

He was born in Charlottetown, Prince Edward Island, the son of John Theophilus Jenkins and Jessie Esther Carson Rice, and was educated at the Ontario Agricultural College in Guelph. In 1892, he married Hannah Sarah Holroyd. Jenkins served in the province's Executive Council as a minister without portfolio from 1912 to 1915. He was speaker from 1924 to 1927. He was defeated when he ran for reelection in 1915, 1919, 1927 and 1931. Jenkins died at the Charlottetown Hospital at the age of 78.

His brother Stephen Rice also served in the provincial assembly.
