= 1876 Prince Edward Island general election =

Canadian provincial election

The 1876 Prince Edward Island election was held on 10 October 1876 to elect members of the House of Assembly of the province of Prince Edward Island, Canada. It was won by the Conservative party. It was Prince Edward Island's first general election as a Canadian province.

Two members were elected in each of 15 two-seat districts.

Party	Leader	1873	Seats won	Popular vote	(%)
Conservative	Lemuel Cambridge Owen	15	15		
Liberal	Louis Henry Davies	10	7		
Non-party		5	8		
Totals		30	30		
