= John Brecken =

Canadian politician (1800–1847)

- Born: February 23, 1800; Charlottetown, Canada
- Died: November 2, 1847 (aged 47)
- Occupation(s): Businessman and politician

John Brecken (February 23, 1800 – November 2, 1847) was a businessman and political figure on Prince Edward Island. He represented Charlottetown in the Legislative Assembly of Prince Edward Island from 1829 to 1834.

He was born in Charlottetown, the son of Ralph Brecken, who had served as speaker in the provincial assembly, and Matilda Robinson, the daughter of Joseph Robinson. When he was thirteen, his father died and his mother took over the operation of the business. Brecken served as deputy treasurer for the colony and resident director for the Bank of British North America. In 1826, he married Margaret Leah de St Croix. He was named to the colony's Council in 1834, serving until his death in Charlottetown in 1847.

His son Frederick de St Croix Brecken served in the provincial assembly and the Canadian House of Commons.

Several of his sisters married members of the Legislative Council:

- Jane Rebecca married Thomas Heath Haviland
- Anna Matilda married Donald McDonald
- Barbara Leila Alice married James Ellis Peake

Brecken's grandfather, also named John, also served in the colony's assembly.
