= John Brecken (loyalist) =

English-born Canadian loyalist (died 1827)

- Died: March 6, 1827; England
- Occupations: United Empire Loyalist, Merchant, Politician
- Years active: 1785–1787
- Organizations: Legislative Assembly of Prince Edward Island
- Spouse: Ann Wake
- Children: Ralph Brecken, John Brecken (grandson)

John Brecken (died March 6, 1827) was an English-born United Empire Loyalist, merchant and political figure. He was a member of the Legislative Assembly of Prince Edward Island from 1785 to 1787.

He came to Charlottetown from Shelburne, Nova Scotia in 1784 with his wife, Ann Wake, and established a business there. He returned to England some time before 1826 and died there in 1827.

His son Ralph and his grandson John Brecken also served in the colony's assembly.
