= Private halls of the University of Oxford =

Former educational institution within the University of Oxford

The private halls of the University of Oxford were educational institutions within the university. They were introduced by the statute De aulis privatis ("On private halls") in 1855 to provide a less expensive alternative to the colleges and academic halls of the early nineteenth century. They survived until 1918, when the last two private halls were recognised as permanent private halls.

== History ==
In the 19th century various factions at Oxford called for reform of the university. In 1850 the prime minister, Lord John Russell, asked a Royal Commission to investigate the University of Oxford; however, the Earl of Derby had taken over as prime minister by the time the commissioners published their report in 1852. The commissioners' report found that potential students were deterred by the cost of living in one of the existing colleges or halls of the university as required by the university statutes of the time. It therefore recommended that the university should be allowed to expand by opening new halls of residence and by allowing students to live in lodgings not connected to the existing colleges or halls. A proposal allowing Master of Arts of the university to open private halls was included in the Oxford University Act 1854, and the university accordingly issued its statute de aulis privatis in 1855. The statute allowed MAs of the university over the age of twenty-eight with the approval of the vice-chancellor to open private halls within one and a half miles of Carfax as “licensed masters”. In the period 1855 to 1918 thirteen such halls were established, but never recruited large numbers of students. The longest lived was Charsley's Hall.

Further reforms allowed the admission of non-collegiate students in 1868 and opening of Keble College in 1870, which both offered lower costs than the older colleges. In 1871, the Universities Tests Act allowed Catholics and dissenters to take degrees at the university (apart from theology); however, a papal decree forbidding Catholics studying at Oxford or Cambridge was not withdrawn until 1895. Shortly afterwards, the Jesuits opened Clarke's Hall (1896) and the Benedictines Hunter-Blair's Hall (1899). In 1918 a university statute was issued to allow the opening of permanent private halls situated less than 2 1/2 miles from Carfax and not run for profit. The only two remaining private halls took the opportunity to become permanent as Campion Hall and St Benet's Hall.

== List of private halls ==
| Name | Master | Dates | Notes |
|---|---|---|---|
| Addis's Hall | William Edward Addis | 1900–1910 | attached to Manchester College |
| Benson's Hall | Richard Meux Benson | c. 1868 | attached to the Society of St John the Evangelist |
| Butler's Hall | George Butler | 1855–1858 | |
| Charsley's Hall (1862–1891); Marcon's Hall (1892–1918) | William Henry Charsley; Charles Abdy Marcon | 1862–1918 | |
| Clarke's Hall (1896–1900); Pope's Hall (1900–1915); Plater's Hall (1915–1918) | Richard Clarke; O'Fallon Pope; Charles Plater | 1896–1918 | Catholic (Jesuit); became Campion Hall |
| Grindle's Hall | Edmund Samuel Grindle | 1891–1903 | Catholic |
| Hunter Blair's Hall (1898–1909); Parker's Hall (1909–1918) | Oswald Hunter Blair; Anselm Parker | 1898–1918 | Catholic (Benedictine); became St Benet's Hall |
| Litton's Hall | Edward Arthur Litton | 1855–1860 | Evangelical |
| Turrell's Hall | Henry Joseph Turrell | 1880–1895 | |

== Sources ==
- Brock, Michael G.; Curthoys, Mark C., eds. (2000). The History of the University of Oxford. Vol. 7: Nineteenth-Century part 2. Oxford University Press. ISBN 9780199510177.
- Brockliss, L.W.B. (2016). The University of Oxford: A History. Oxford University Press. doi:10.1093/acprof:oso/9780199243563.001.0001. ISBN 9780199243563.
