= Benjamin Davies (politician) =

Canadian politician (1813–1904)

Member of the Legislative Assembly of Prince Edward Island for 3rd Queens
- In office 1850–1854

Member of the Legislative Assembly of Prince Edward Island for 4th Queens
- In office 1867–1876

Personal details
- Born: 1813 Charlottetown, Prince Edward Island
- Died: September 1904 (aged 90–91) Charlottetown, Prince Edward Island
- Party: Liberal
- Spouse: Kezia Attwood Watts (m. 1843–1853) Eliza Francis Cooke (m. 1854–1889)
- Children: 6 including Louis Henry Davies

Benjamin Davies (1813 – September 1904) was a merchant and political figure in Prince Edward Island, Canada. He represented 3rd Queens from 1850 to 1854 and 4th Queens from 1867 to 1876 in the Legislative Assembly of Prince Edward Island as a Liberal member.

== Biography ==
He was born in Charlottetown, the son of Nathan Davies, an immigrant from Wales of Huguenot descent, and Amelia MacNutt. In 1813, he married Kezia Attwood Watts. Davies married Eliza Francis Cooke in 1854 after the death of his first wife. He was a lieutenant-colonel in the militia cavalry. Davies served in the province's Executive Council as Postmaster General, Colonial Secretary and chairman of the Railway Board.

He operated shipbuilding yards, owned a number of ships and was also an exporter of goods. Davies became ill during the winter of 1903-4 and died in Charlottetown later that year.

His son Louis Henry Davies became premier of Prince Edward Island and later served in the Supreme Court of Canada.
