= Richard Duckworth (campanologist) =

English campanologist

Richard Duckworth (fl. 1695), was an English campanologist.

Duckworth, a native of Leicestershire, is probably identical with the Richard Duckworth mentioned, under date 4 May 1648, in the 'Register of Visitors of the University of Oxford appointed by the Long parliament in 1647' as one of the 'submitting' undergraduates of New Inn Hall (p. 38), and with the Richard Ducker who, according to the same authority, was a member and perhaps scholar of Brasenose College about the same time.

He matriculated at New Inn Hall in 1649, graduated B.A. in 1651, and proceeded M.A. in 1653. He is said to have been 'afterwards of University College’. Wood tells us that he was 'put in fellow of Brazen-nose college from New Inn Hall by the visitors, took the degrees in arts and holy orders, and preached for some time near Oxon.,’ and that afterwards 'he was created B.D., and on the death of Dan. Greenwood became rector of Steeple Aston in Oxfordshire in 1679.'

He adds that, 'the parishioners and he disagreeing, he left that place, and in 1692 or thereabouts became principal of St. Alban's Hall,’ and that he published the following works: 1. 'Tintinnalogie, or the Art of Ringing,’ &c., London, 1671, 8vo. 2. 'Instructions for Hanging of Bells, with all things belonging thereunto.'
