= Treaty of Washington (1871) =

Treaty signed in 1871 between the United Kingdom and United States

Treaty between Her Majesty and the United States of America for the Amicable Settlement of all Causes of Difference Between the Two Countries ("Alabama" Claims; Fisheries; Claims of Corporations, Companies or Private Individuals; Navigation of Rivers and Lakes; San Juan Water Boundary; and Rules Defining Duties of a Neutral Government during War).
- Signed: May 8, 1871
- Location: Washington, D.C.
- Effective: June 17, 1871
- Signatories: (United Kingdom of Great Britain and Ireland) Marquess of Ripon; (United Kingdom of Great Britain and Ireland) Earl of Iddesleigh; (United Kingdom of Great Britain and Ireland) Count of Cacilhas; (Canada) John A. Macdonald; (United Kingdom of Great Britain and Ireland) Mountague Bernard; (United States) Hamilton Fish; (United States) Robert C. Schenck; (United States) Samuel Nelson; (United States) Ebenezer R. Hoar; (United States) George H. Williams
- Parties: United Kingdom; United States
- Language: English

Full text
- Treaty of Washington at Wikisource

The Treaty of Washington was a treaty signed and ratified by the United Kingdom and the United States in 1871 during the first premiership of William Gladstone and the presidency of Ulysses S. Grant. It settled various disputes between the countries, including the Alabama Claims for damages to American shipping caused by British-built warships, as well as illegal fishing in Canadian waters and British civilian losses in the American Civil War. It inaugurated permanent peaceful relations between the United States and Canada, and also with the United Kingdom. After the arbitrators endorsed the American position in 1872, Britain settled the matter by paying the United States $15.5 million (approximately $416.56 million in 2025), ending the dispute and leading to a treaty that restored friendly relations between Britain and the United States. That international arbitration established a precedent, and the case aroused interest in codifying public international law.

== Background ==
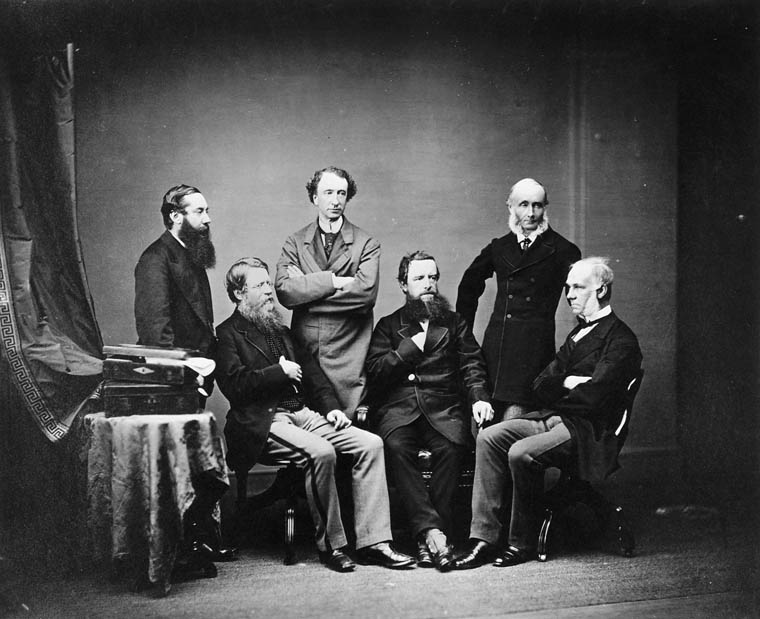
The British high commissioners to the Treaty of Washington of 1871. Standing: L. to R.: Lord Tenterden, Sir John A. Macdonald, Mountague Bernard. Seated: L. to R.: Sir Stafford Northcote, Earl de Grey & Ripon, Sir Edward Thornton.

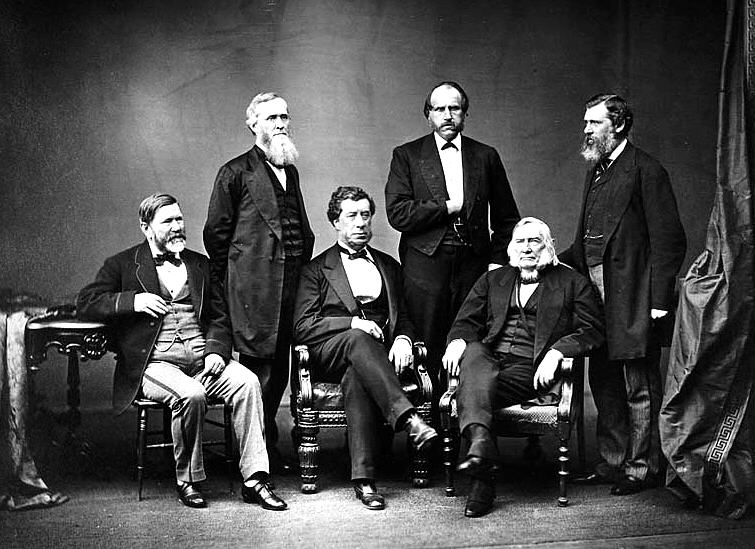
The American High Commissioners to the Treaty of Washington. U.S. Secretary of State Hamilton Fish was chairman. Standing: L. to R.: Ebenezer R. Hoar, George Henry Williams, Bancroft Davis. Seated: L. to R.: Robert C. Schenck, Sec. Hamilton Fish, Samuel Nelson. Photo by Brady, 1871

In early 1871, the British government sent Sir John Rose to the United States to ascertain whether negotiations to settle the Northwestern boundary dispute would be acceptable to President Ulysses S. Grant. The U.S. government through Grant's Secretary of State, Hamilton Fish, cordially received his advances and, on January 26, Sir Edward Thornton, the British Minister at Washington formally proposed the appointment of a joint high commission to meet in Washington to resolve the dispute. The United States consented, provided that the differences growing out of the Civil War be among the subjects to be considered. The British government accepted the American proviso and the president appointed commissioners.

== Joint commission ==
The British government selected as its commissioners the Earl de Grey and Ripon, Sir Stafford Northcote, Lord Tenterden, Sir Edward Thornton, Mountague Bernard, and Canadian Prime Minister John A. Macdonald. President Grant appointed as U.S. commissioners Secretary of State Hamilton Fish, who was chairman, Robert Schenck, Ebenezer R. Hoar, George Henry Williams, Samuel Nelson, and J.C. Bancroft Davis.

Although the treaty was signed in the name of the United Kingdom, Macdonald's presence established that the newly formed Dominion of Canada would at least take part in settling foreign matters that affected it directly, especially with respect to dealings with the United States. The joint commission entered upon its task and on 8 May concluded a treaty which received the prompt approval of the two governments. Aside from the settlement of the dispute growing out of the so-called Alabama Claims, provision was made for the adjustment of the differences with regard to the northeastern fisheries by the appointment of a mixed commission to meet at Halifax and pass upon the relative value of certain reciprocal privileges granted each of the contracting parties. In 1877, the Halifax Fisheries Commission appointed under the treaty directed the United States to pay $5,500,000 to the British Government as compensation.

Finally, a provision was made whereby William I, German Emperor, would be arbitrator of the Pig War dispute concerning the maritime boundary surrounding the San Juan Islands. The choice of the emperor as arbitrator reflected the prestige Germany had acquired after its victory in the Franco-Prussian War, and the trust both the United States and the United Kingdom had in the Berlin government. The issue in dispute concerning the San Juan Islands traced to ambiguous wording of a previous 1846 treaty. William I issued his finding on October 21, 1872, holding that the entire San Juan archipelago belong to the United States.

At Geneva, in 1872, the United States was awarded $15,500,000 pursuant to the terms of the treaty, and the British apologized for the destruction caused by the British-built Confederate ships but admitted no guilt. However, no compensation for damages done to the U.S. by British-built blockade runners carrying arms supplies to the Confederacy was offered.

The lack of compensation from Canada greatly irritated Macdonald, but he nonetheless signed the treaty under the argument that he was a junior member of the British delegation. The treaty was published in the Canadian press to widespread condemnation, but Macdonald remained silent on the issue. When it came time to debate the treaty in the House of Commons of Canada, he revealed that he had been secretly negotiating for a better deal and had obtained a cash payment from the Americans for the use of Canadian fishing grounds, and in lieu of any claim against the United States over the Fenians. Furthermore, the British had agreed to a guaranteed loan of £3,600,000 for the construction of the Canadian Pacific Railway. This masterstroke of diplomacy and statecraft allowed an otherwise deeply unpopular treaty to be ratified by the Parliament of Canada.

John Bull (United Kingdom) is dwarfed by a gigantic inflated American "Alabama Claim" cartoon in Punch--or the London Charivari 22 Jan 1872.

== Impact on international law ==
The scholar of international law John Bassett Moore called this treaty "the greatest treaty of actual and immediate arbitration the world has ever seen." These included so-called rules of Washington agreed upon by the contracting parties for the guidance of the tribunal in the interpretation of certain terms used in the treaty and of certain principles of international law governing the obligations of neutrals:

1. That due diligence "ought to be exercised by neutral governments in exact proportion to the risks to which either of the belligerents may be exposed, from a failure to fulfill the obligations of neutrality on their part."
2. "The effects of a violation of neutrality committed by means of the construction, equipment, and armament of a vessel are not done away with by any commission which the government of the belligerent power benefited by the violation of neutrality may afterward have granted to that vessel; and the ultimate step by which the offense is completed cannot be admissible as a ground for the absolution of the offender, nor can the consummation of his fraud become the means of establishing his innocence."
3. "The principle of extraterritoriality has been admitted into the laws of nations, not as an absolute right, but solely as a proceeding founded on the principle of courtesy and mutual deference between different nations, and therefore can never be appealed to for the protection of acts done in violation of neutrality."

These rules affected the 1878 Congress of Berlin, and the precedent set by these rules would eventually grow into League of Nations and the United Nations.

== Implications ==
The Treaty of Washington had a significant effect on the Americans' long-term relationship with Canada and Britain. Since the Rush-Bagot Treaty demilitarized the Canada–US border, the resolution of outstanding issues via the Treaty of Washington and the industrialization of the Great Lakes region, the risk of war between the United States and the United Kingdom became highly unlikely and was never seriously considered by either side again. The United States government mostly ceased official talk of annexing Canada. The treaty laid the foundation for The Great Rapprochement, the convergence of interests between the United Kingdom and the United States.
