= Charsley's Hall =

Former private hall of the University of Oxford

- University of Oxford
- Location: Parks Road
- Coordinates: 51.758031°N 1.256501°W
- Latin name: Aula Privata Magistri Charsley
- Established: 1862
- Closed: 1891, then became Marcon's Hall (1892–1918)
- Named for: William Henry Charsley (Master)
- Master: William Henry Charsley

Map
- Location within Oxford city centre

Charsley's Hall was a private hall of the University of Oxford. After 1891, it was renamed Marcon's Hall.

The hall was established in 1862 by William Henry Charsley, formerly of Christ Church, under the university statute De Aulis Privatis (On private halls), passed in 1855. The statute allowed any Master of Arts or other member of Convocation aged at least twenty-eight to open a private hall after obtaining a licence to do so. The hall was in what is now 10 Parks Road, at the eastern corner of Museum Road, on the other side of the road from the Oxford University Museum. It was a red-brick Victorian house designed by Charles Buckeridge and built in 1862. At the 1871 census, it contained nine residents.

Charsley's Hall had no published tuition fees, members elected their tutors and made their own payment arrangements, although the terms were generally higher than elsewhere. Despite this, the hall was popular. One writer noted in 1883

Mr Charsley is the first master who has achieved any success as the head of such an institution. His hall, however, is the resort of a class of pupils who have, for the most part, larger means than those who enter the University avowedly as frugal students, the terms being somewhat high.

By 1889, migration to Charsley's was seen as a way of circumventing some requirements of the colleges, and its demise was prematurely foreseen by The Oxford Magazine.

... and yet if they, through lack of natural ability, fail to pass Mods, by a certain time, down they go and nothing is left them but to migrate to Charsley's Hall, itself perhaps to be abolished ere long. The life of a man at a private hall now-a-days is utterly different from that of a man at New Inn Hall as it used to be. Some of the restrictions (we hope Mr. Charsley will pardon us) are vexatious in the case of men residing at the Hall...

Charsley's Hall features several times in The Lay of the First Minstrel, a parody of Sir Walter Scott dating from the 1870s, beginning:

It was an Oxford Scholar bright,
(The sun shone fair on Charsley's Hall,)
And he would get him thoroughly tight,
For Gilbey'll still be lord of all...

In 1889–1890 Charsley's had forty-seven undergraduates, while Turrell's, the only other private hall, had seven. The Master, William Henry Charsley, appears to have kept a school for boys as well as a house of the university. This is suggested as a reason for matriculations at Charsley's at an unusually young age. By the end of 1891 Charsley's Hall had closed, to be reopened by Charles Abdy Marcon as Marcon's Hall in 1892. Marcon had himself been educated at Charsley's.

Whitaker's Almanack for 1897 lists three private halls in the university, based on the University Calendar for 1895: Marcon's, Turrell's and Grindle's. Marcon's continued under that name until C. A. Marcon retired in 1918.

== Notable people ==
- William Morfill taught philosophy and modern history at Charsley's between 1865 and 1869
- Edward John Payne completed his first degree at Charsley's in 1871
- Charles Abdy Marcon, who took his first degree from Charsley's in 1878, succeeded W. H. Charsley as Master in 1891
