= John Theophilus Jenkins =

Canadian politician

John Theophilus Jenkins (October 12, 1829 – January 17, 1919) was a physician and political figure in Prince Edward Island. He represented Charlottetown in the Legislative Assembly of Prince Edward Island from 1873 to 1876 and Queen's County in the House of Commons of Canada from 1882 to 1883 and from 1884 to 1887 as a Liberal-Conservative member. He was the first native-born physician on Prince Edward Island.

He was born in Charlottetown, the son of Reverend J.C. Jenkins and Penelope Desbrisay who was the daughter of Theophilus Desbrisay. He was educated at the Central Academy in Charlottetown and at St Bartholomew's Hospital in London, England. Jenkins served as a surgeon in the Ottoman Army during the Crimean War. He was coroner and health officer for Charlottetown and married Jessie Esther, the daughter of Stephen Rice in 1856. His election to the House of Commons in 1882 was declared invalid after an appeal; Jenkins was elected to the same seat in an 1884 by-election after Frederick de St Croix Brecken resigned his seat to accept an appointment as postmaster for Charlottetown. He was elected to the provincial assembly in 5th Queens in an 1891 by-election held after Patrick Blake ran unsuccessfully for a seat in the House of Commons and served until 1893.

Jenkins also raised horses and owned a ranch in Western Canada which his son Henry Herbert "Tammy" Jenkins ran, Tammy was a former NWMP vet. J.T. died in Charlottetown at the age of 89.

His son Stephen Rice Jenkins was also a physician and served in the provincial assembly and his son Louis, a farmer, was a member of the provincial assembly.
