= Mountague Bernard =

Mountague Bernard (28 January 1820 – 1882) was an English international lawyer.

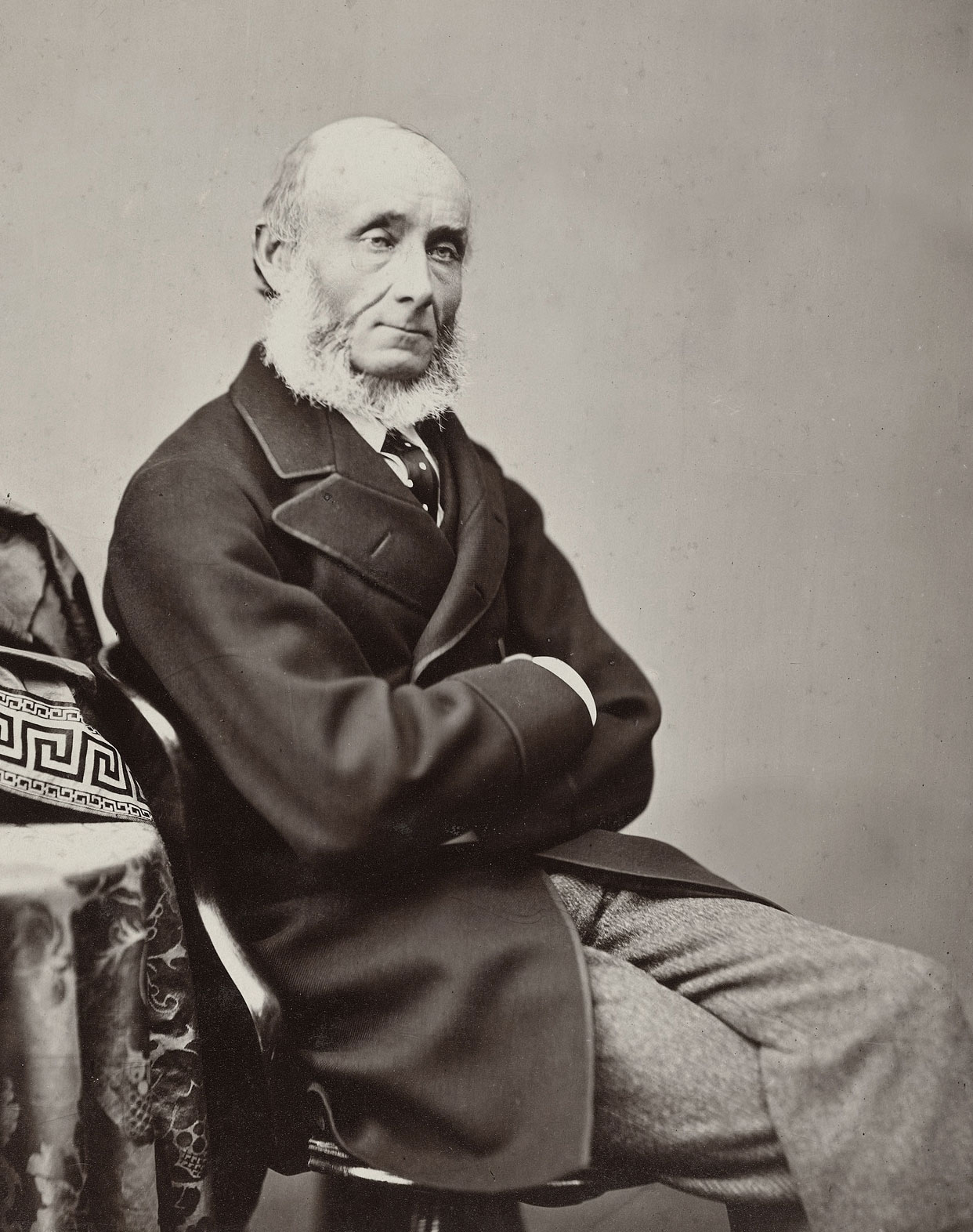
Mountague Bernard (1820–1882) English international lawyer

== Life ==
He was the third son of Charles Bernard of Jamaica, the descendant of a Huguenot family, and was born at Tibberton Court, Gloucestershire.

He was educated at Sherborne School, and Trinity College, Oxford. Graduating BA in 1842, he took his BCL, was elected Vinerian scholar and fellow, and having read in chambers with Roundell Palmer (afterwards Lord Selborne), was called to the bar at Lincoln's Inn in 1846. He was specially interested in legal history and in church questions, and was one of the founders of the Guardian.

In 1852 he was elected the newly established post of Chichele Professor of International Law and Diplomacy at Oxford, attached to All Souls' College, of which he afterwards was made a fellow. But besides his duties at Oxford he undertook a good deal of non-collegiate work; he was a member of several royal commissions; in 1871 he went as one of the high commissioners to the United States, and signed the treaty of Washington, and in 1872 he assisted Sir Roundell Palmer before the tribunal of arbitration at Geneva.

In 1874 he resigned his professorship at Oxford, but as member of the university of Oxford commission of 1876 he was mainly responsible for bringing about the compromise ultimately adopted between the university and the colleges. Bernard's reputation as an international lawyer was widespread, and he was an original member of the Institut de Droit International (1873).

== Works ==
His published works include A Historical Account of the Neutrality of Great Britain during the American Civil War (London, 1870), and many lectures on international law and diplomacy.
