= Frederick de St Croix Brecken =

Canadian politician

Frederick de St. Croix Brecken KC (9 December 1828 – 14 October 1903) was a lawyer and political figure in Prince Edward Island. He represented Charlottetown in the Legislative Assembly of Prince Edward Island from 1873 to 1876 and Queen's County in the House of Commons of Canada from 1878 to 1882 and from 1883 to 1884 as a Conservative member.

He was born in Charlottetown, the son of John Brecken and Margaret Leah de St. Croix. He was educated in Charlottetown and then articled in law with Robert Hodgson, continuing his studied at Lincoln's Inn and the Inner Temple in London. On his return, he was called to the bar and set up practice in Charlottetown with Thomas Heath Haviland. In 1858, Brecken married Helen Leith Boyd Emslie. In 1875, he was named Queen's Counsel. He was named attorney general in 1859. When that post became elective in 1863, he ran successfully for a seat in the island's assembly and served in the Executive Council as Attorney General from 1870 to 1872 and 1873 to 1876. He was defeated in the provincial election of 1876. Brecken ran unsuccessfully for a seat in the House of Commons in 1873. He was defeated for the federal seat by John Theophilus Jenkins in 1882 but was declared elected in 1883 after an appeal. In 1884, he was named postmaster of Charlottetown and continued to serve in that post until his death in Charlottetown in 1903.
