= List of founding Fellows, Scholars and Commissioners of Jesus College, Oxford =

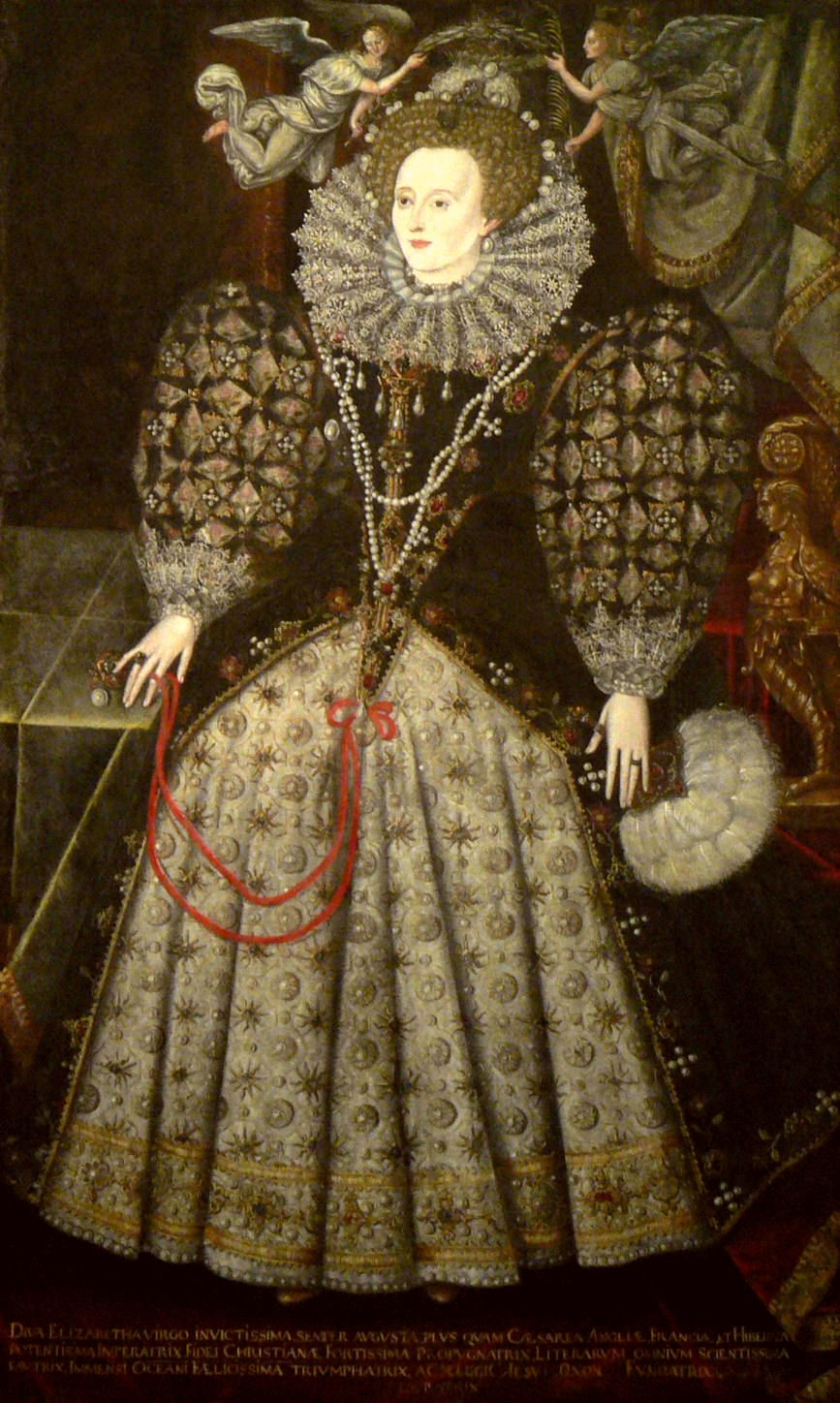
The portrait of Elizabeth I in the hall of Jesus College, attributed to Nicholas Hilliard

Jesus College, Oxford, the first Protestant college at the University of Oxford, was founded by Elizabeth I in 1571 at the instigation of a Welsh clergyman, Hugh Price. The royal charter issued by Elizabeth appointed a Principal and various Fellows, Scholars and Commissioners: the Fellows to educate the Scholars and to run the college, under the overall direction of the Principal; and the Commissioners to draw up statutes for the governance of the college, its officers and servants, and the management of the college property. The college was founded to help with the increased numbers of Welsh students at Oxford, and the founding Fellows included a number of individuals with links to Wales. The Commissioners included prominent individuals such as William Cecil, Lord Burghley, the Principal Secretary of State. The charter also gave land and buildings in Oxford to the new college.

Whilst the foundation process of the college started in 1571, it took more than fifty years and a further two charters, one in 1589 from Elizabeth and one in 1622 from her successor, James I, to complete the process. These further charters were necessary because neither the Commissioners appointed by the 1571 charter nor those appointed by the 1589 charter fulfilled their allotted task of drawing up statutes. During this time, Griffith Powell (one of the Fellows who was pressing for statutes to be drawn up) concluded that successive Principals were loath to have statutes, since these would limit the Principal's powers. One Principal lost a draft copy of the statutes; the next kept the next draft in his study for several years without taking steps to have them confirmed by the Commissioners. It was not until after the 1622 charter that statutes were approved by the Commissioners and the college was fully constituted. Despite the intention on the foundation of the college, none of the charters made special provision for Welsh students, although the students were predominantly Welsh from the outset.

== Background to the foundation of the college ==
Jesus College was the first Protestant college to be founded at the University of Oxford, and it is the only Oxford college to date from Elizabeth's reign. It was the first new Oxford college since 1555, in the reign of Mary, when Trinity College and St John's College were founded as Roman Catholic colleges. The opening phrases of the charter, translated from the original Latin, have been noted as referring to the recent ecclesiastical changes in stating the purposes for which the college was founded:

... to the Glory of God Almighty and Omnipotent, and for the spread and maintenance of the Christian religion in its sincere form, for the eradication of errors and heresies, for the increase and perpetuation of true loyalty, for the extension of good literature of every sort, for the knowledge of languages, for the education of youth in loyalty, morality, and methodical learning, for the relief of poverty and distress, and lastly for the benefit and well-being of the Church of Christ in our realms and of our subjects of our especial grace and of our own sure knowledge and spontaneous motion, we have decreed that a College of learning in the sciences, philosophy, humane pursuits, knowledge of the Hebrew, Greek and Latin languages, to the ultimate profession of Sacred Theology, to last for all time to come, be created, founded, built, and established...

Education in Wales had been stimulated by the foundation of grammar schools during the reigns of Henry VIII and Edward VI: King Henry VIII Grammar School in Abergavenny and Christ College, Brecon were established in the 1540s, and Friars School, Bangor dates from 1557. However, despite the numbers of Welsh students coming to Oxford University as a result, there was no special provision for Welshmen before 1571. A Welsh clergyman, Hugh Price, therefore petitioned Elizabeth to found a college at Oxford "that he might bestow his estate of the maintenance of certain scholars of Wales to be trained up in good letters." Whatever Price's wishes, and despite the links that he and many of the founding Fellows had with Wales, neither the 1571 charter nor any of the later charters limited entry to the college to Welshmen. Nevertheless, the college students were predominantly Welsh from the outset, and the college became "the pinnacle of the academic ambition of the young men of Wales".

== The charters ==
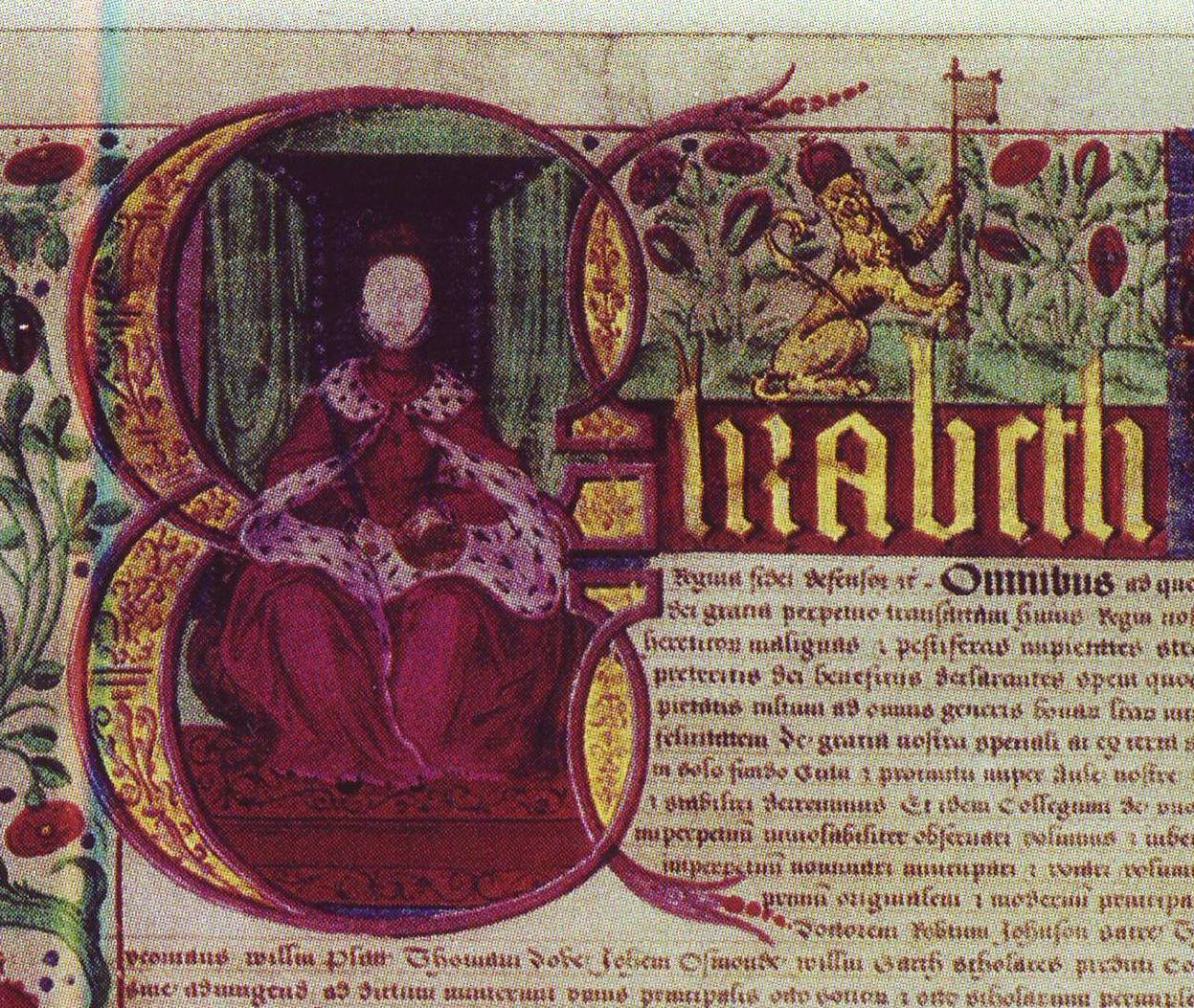
The illuminated letter "E", depicting Elizabeth I, in the 1571 charter

Jesus College came into being when Elizabeth issued a charter dated 27 June 1571. The charter named a Principal (David Lewis), eight Fellows, eight Scholars and eight Commissioners. The eight Scholars named in the 1571 charter appear to have had nothing more than a purely notional connection to the college. Five of them are known to have studied at Merchant Taylors' School and Cambridge University, with four taking up scholarships in Greek at Pembroke Hall, Cambridge. The Commissioners were required to draw up statutes, which had to be approved by a majority of them. The Commissioners included Nicholas Bacon (Lord Keeper of the Great Seal), William Cecil, Lord Burghley (Principal Secretary of State) and Gilbert Gerard (Attorney General) – three "political heavyweights". The charter also gave to the new college the site and buildings of White Hall, located on Market Street and Ship Street – the college still occupies this site today. White Hall, which had closed in 1570, was one of the academic halls associated with the University – these were institutions that offered accommodation for students, but little in the way of teaching, and they were disappearing as the collegiate system at Oxford grew.

The charter, written in Latin on the flesh side of a prepared calfskin, is 88 by 61 centimetres (35 by 24 in). It is highly decorated with Tudor designs and motifs, with its style being similar to that of books of hours. Elizabeth is depicted in the opening illuminated letter, seated on a blue throne in robes of scarlet trimmed with ermine, and holding an orb and sceptre. It has been suggested by the art historian Roy Strong that the image is based on the work of Levina Teerlinc, a Flemish miniaturist. The border is decorated with floral and heraldic motifs, including the Tudor rose. The Great Seal of England was used to authenticate the charter, and the remnants of the Seal are still attached to it.

As the Commissioners did not complete their task of drawing up statutes before too many of them had died to permit the remainder to act, a second charter, dated 7 July 1589, was obtained by the then Principal, Francis Bevans. Elizabeth appointed thirteen Commissioners, any three of whom could approve the statutes, and also confirmed Bevans as Principal. Thereafter Griffith Powell, a former student of the college who had been elected to a fellowship in 1589, drafted some statutes and attempted to have them confirmed by the new Commissioners. However, neither Bevans nor his successor John Williams pressed for statutes to be confirmed. In their absence, the Principal had an autocratic position. Powell's view was that successive Principals were "loath to have any statutes at all", since their power would be "limited" by them. Bevans took Powell's draft to his residence in Hereford, where he stayed for several years and lost the copy. In 1595, Powell took another copy to John Whitgift, Archbishop of Canterbury and chief Commissioner, who rebuked Bevans for not attempting to obtain statutes. Whitgift passed the draft to two other Commissioners in turn, Gabriel Goodman, the Dean of Westminster, and Herbert Westphaling, Bishop of Hereford. Westphaling signed the draft in June 1601. With two more signatures still being required, the statutes were sent to John Herbert in 1602. However, Williams took the draft statutes away before Herbert approved them, and kept them in his study until 1609 without making further attempts to have them confirmed.

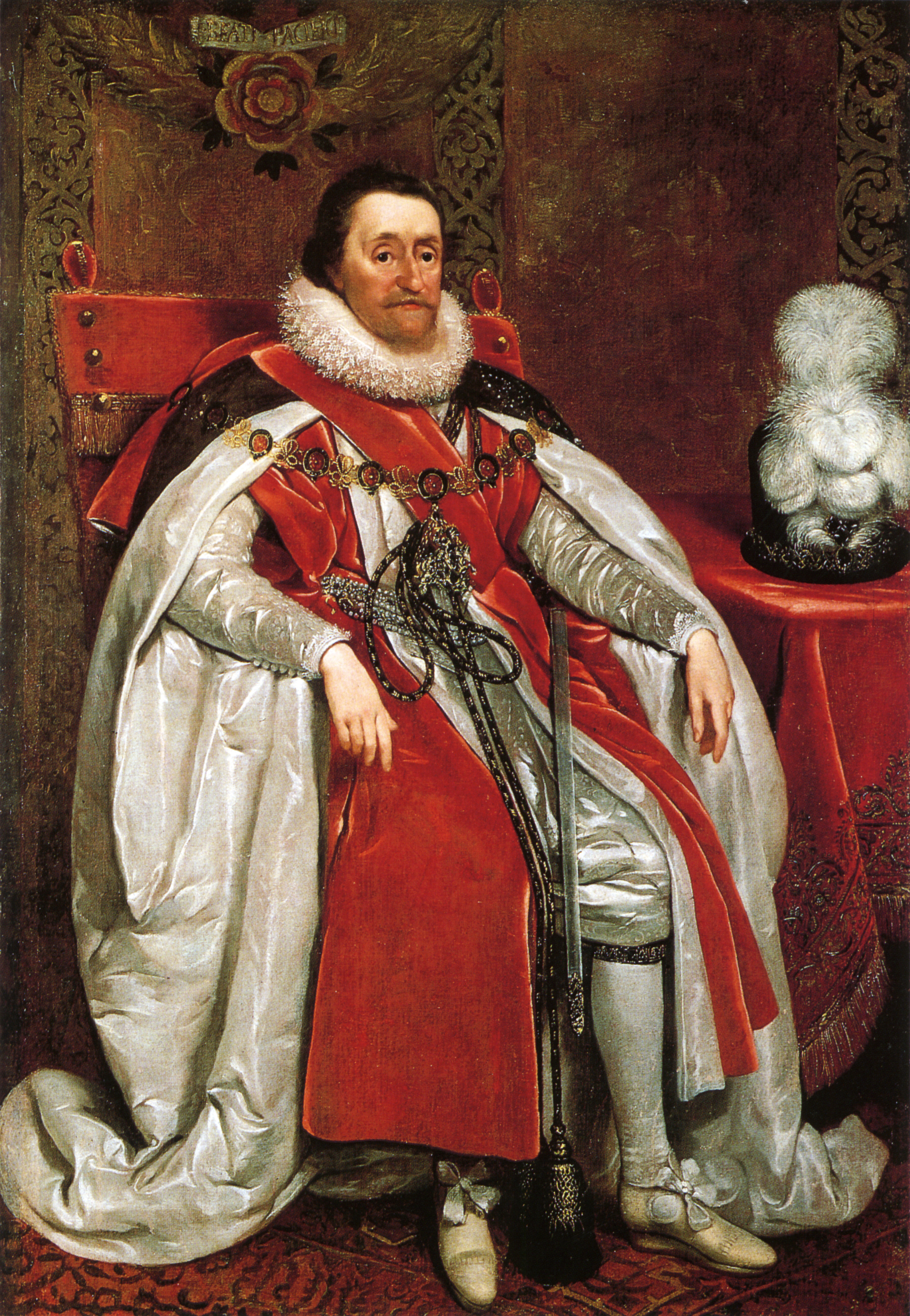
A portrait of James I by Daniel Mytens from 1621

In 1609, Powell brought matters to the attention of Richard Bancroft, Archbishop of Canterbury and Chancellor of the University, and Bancroft compelled Williams to produce the statutes. Williams expelled Powell from his fellowship, but the Chancellor ordered his reinstatement. Bancroft died in 1610, and his successor as Archbishop, George Abbot (who was not a Commissioner), found the statutes in his study and returned them to Williams, who took no further steps before his death in 1613. Powell, who had run the college during the long absences of Bevans and who was Vice-Principal under Williams, was appointed Principal by Thomas Egerton, Lord Ellesmere, the Chancellor of the University, in 1613. However, there were by that time insufficient living Commissioners to validate the statute. It was not until Sir Eubule Thelwall became Principal in 1621 that matters moved forward. A third charter was obtained from James I on 1 June 1622, confirming Thelwall as Principal and nominating eight Fellows and eight Scholars. Two Fellows (Robert Johnson and John Higginson) and two Scholars (Lancelot Andrewes and Thomas Dove) were survivors from the 1571 charter. Four of the other six Scholars in the 1622 charter are known to have been undergraduates at Jesus College at the time; the other two appear to have been relatives of the Principal, Sir Eubule Thelwall, but do not appear in the college records. The charter also appointed new commissioners, and little time was taken in drawing up the statutes thereafter.

== People named in the 1571 charter ==
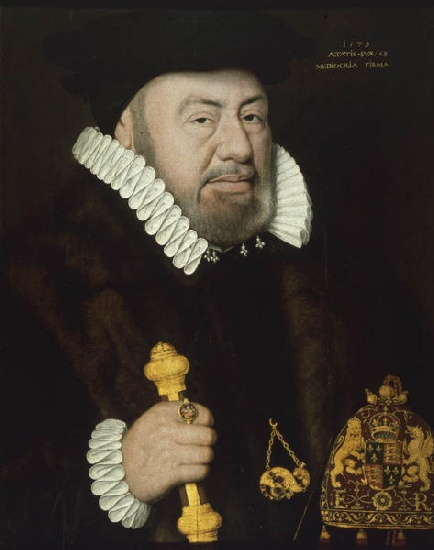
Sir Nicholas Bacon, one of the Commissioners named in the charter of 1571

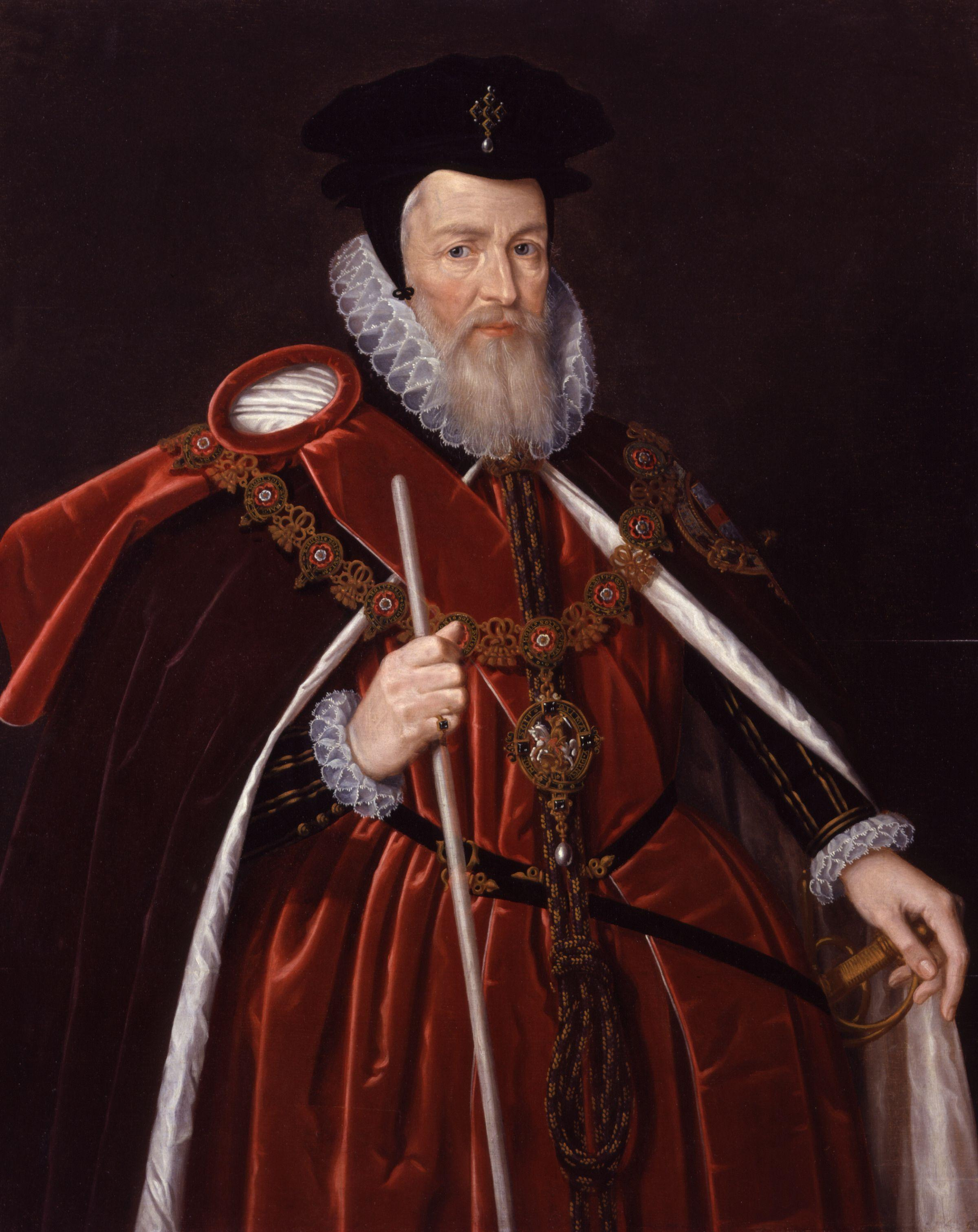
William Cecil, Lord Burghley, one of the Commissioners named in the charters of 1571 and 1589

Details about the people named in the first charter
Name	Position	Notes	Ref
Lancelot Andrewes	Scholar	Andrewes studied at Merchant Taylors' School and Pembroke Hall, Cambridge and was later Bishop of Chichester, Bishop of Winchester and one of the translators of the King James Bible. He was also named as a Scholar in the 1622 charter.	
William Aubrey	Fellow and Commissioner	A former Regius Professor of Civil Law (1553–1559); reappointed as a Commissioner in the 1589 charter	
Nicholas Bacon	Commissioner	Lord Keeper of the Great Seal under Elizabeth I	
William Cecil, Lord Burghley	Commissioner	Secretary of State and leading adviser to Elizabeth I; reappointed as a Commissioner in the 1589 charter	
The Chancellor or Vice-Chancellor of the University	Commissioner	The Chancellor at the time of the 1571 charter was Robert Dudley, 1st Earl of Leicester (Chancellor 1564–1588, with Sir Thomas Bromley deputising for him between 1585 and 1588). Dudley was succeeded by Sir Christopher Hatton (Chancellor 1588–1591), who was named as a Commissioner in the 1589 charter. The Vice-Chancellor in 1571 was Lawrence Humphrey. He was succeeded in 1576 by Herbert Westphaling, who was named as a Commissioner in the 1589 charter. After Westphaling, there was a new Vice-Chancellor every year until the 1589 charter.	
John Cotterell	Fellow	Clergyman, formerly Principal of White Hall and Laurence Hall, Oxford	
Thomas Dove	Scholar	Dove studied at Merchant Taylors' School and Pembroke Hall, Cambridge. He was also named in the 1622 charter, and became Bishop of Peterborough.	
Gregory Downhall	Scholar	Studied at Merchant Taylors' School (where he was a founding scholar) and Pembroke Hall, Cambridge	
William Garth	Scholar	Unknown background – no evidence that he matriculated at either Oxford or Cambridge	
Gilbert Gerard	Commissioner	Attorney-General under Elizabeth I; reappointed as a Commissioner in the 1589 charter	
John Higginson	Fellow	A Leicestershire priest, named as a Fellow of the college in the 1622 charter	
Thomas Huet	Fellow	Precentor of St David's Cathedral (1562–1588)	
Thomas Huyck	Fellow and Commissioner	Chancellor of the Diocese of London	
Robert Johnson	Fellow	Later Archdeacon of Leicester and founder of Oakham and Uppingham Schools, and named as a Fellow of the college in the 1622 charter	
David Lewis	Principal and Commissioner	First Principal (resigning 1572); Fellow of All Souls, former Principal of New Inn Hall, Oxford, a judge of the High Court of Admiralty (appointed in 1558)	
John Lloyd	Fellow	Former Dean of St Asaph, judge of the High Court of Admiralty	
Robert Lougher	Fellow	Principal of New Inn Hall, Oxford (1564–1570 and 1575–1580) and Regius Professor of Civil Law (1566–1577)	
John Osmand	Scholar	Unknown background – no evidence that he matriculated at either Oxford or Cambridge	
William Platt	Scholar	Studied at Merchant Taylors' School and Christ's College, Cambridge	
Hugh Price	Commissioner	Treasurer of St David's Cathedral and founder of the college, his name appears twice in the charter (as a benefactor promising a bequest worth £60 per year, and then as the first-named Commissioner)	
John Wilford	Scholar	Studied at Merchant Taylors' School and Pembroke Hall, Cambridge	
Francis Yeomans	Scholar	Unknown background – no evidence that he matriculated at either Oxford or Cambridge	

== People named in the 1589 charter ==
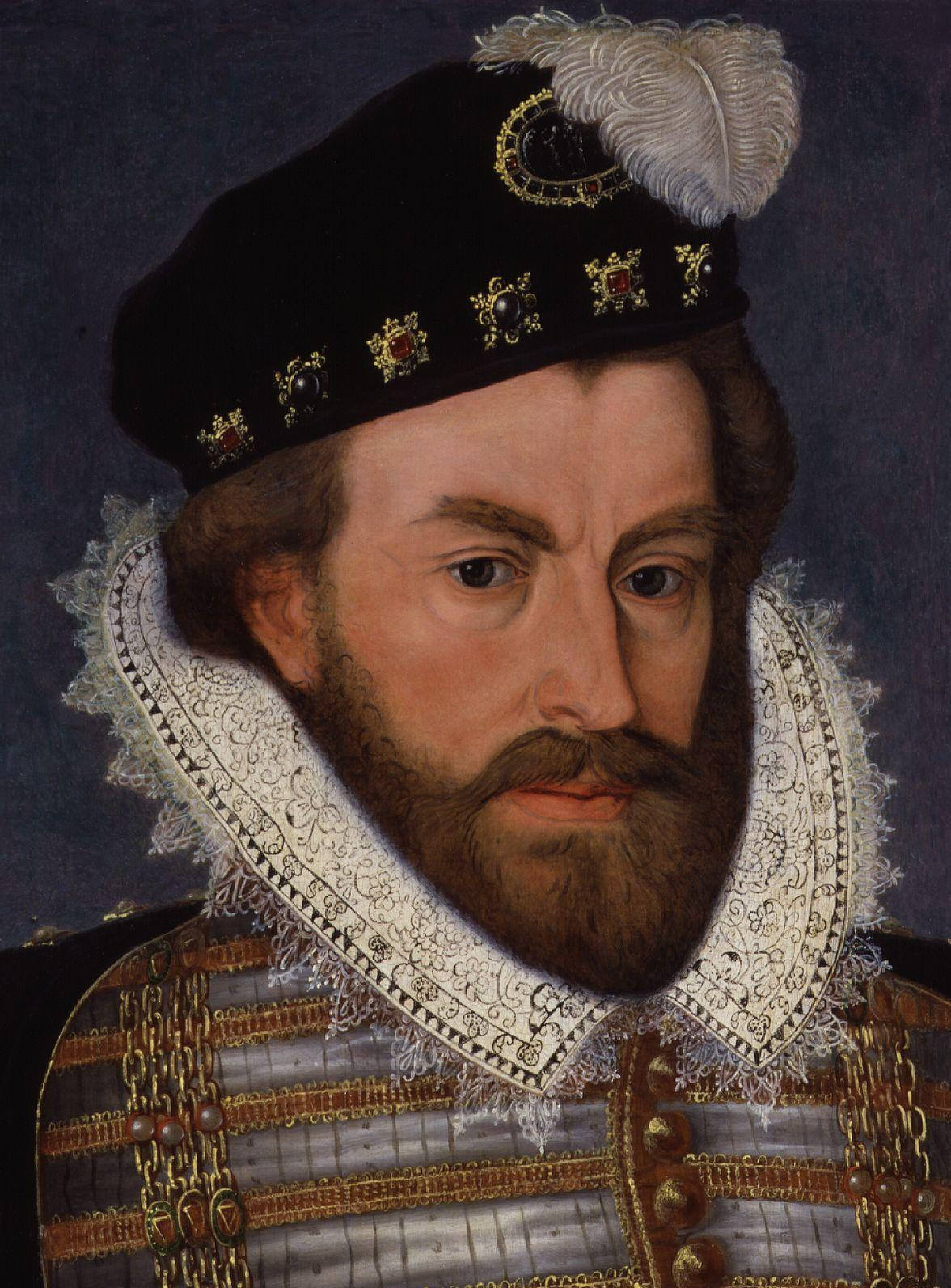
Sir Christopher Hatton, Chancellor of the University in 1589

The charter of 1589 appointed 13 Commissioners – whilst Francis Bevans was confirmed as Principal, no Fellows or Scholars were appointed by this charter.

Details about people named in the second charter
Name	Notes
William Aubrey	Also named as a Fellow of the college and a Commissioner in the 1571 charter
Francis Bevans	Principal of the college (1586–1602)
William Cecil, Lord Burghley	Also named as a Commissioner in the 1571 charter
The Chancellor or Vice-Chancellor of the University	The Chancellor at the time of the 1589 charter was Sir Christopher Hatton (Chancellor 1588–1591), who was also named personally as a Commissioner. His successors were Thomas Sackville, 1st Earl of Dorset (1591–1608); Richard Bancroft (Archbishop of Canterbury) (1608–1610); Thomas Egerton, 1st Viscount Brackley (1610–1616); and William Herbert, 3rd Earl of Pembroke (1616–1630). There were 16 different Vice-Chancellors between 1589 and 1622.
Gilbert Gerard	Also named as a Commissioner in the 1571 charter
Gabriel Goodman	Dean of Westminster
Sir Christoper Hatton	Lord Chancellor
John Herbert	Secretary of State
Henry Jones	A Welsh clergyman and lawyer
John Lloyd	Also named as a Fellow of the college, but not a Commissioner, in the 1571 charter
Richard Harris	Principal of Brasenose College, Oxford (1573–1595)
Herbert Westphaling	Bishop of Hereford, to whom Principal Francis Bevans was chancellor
John Whitgift	Archbishop of Canterbury

== People named in the 1622 charter ==
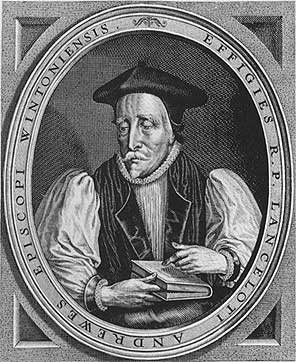
Lancelot Andrewes, named as a Scholar in the charters of 1571 and 1622

William Herbert, 3rd Earl of Pembroke, Chancellor of the University in 1622 and one of the signatories of the new statutes

Details about people named in the third charter
Name	Position	Notes	Ref
Lancelot Andrewes	Scholar	Also named as a Scholar in the 1571 charter	
Sir John Bennet	Commissioner	Judge of the Prerogative Court of Canterbury, elected MP for the University in 1621	
William Bird	Commissioner	Dean of the Court of Arches (appointed 1618), and a former MP for the University	
Henry Bould	Scholar	Later became a Fellow of the college (1623–1638)	
The Chancellor or Vice-Chancellor of the University	Commissioner	The Chancellor at the time of the 1622 charter was William Herbert, 3rd Earl of Pembroke, and he was one of the signatories of the statutes. The Vice-Chancellor, William Piers, did not sign.	
William Dolben	Fellow	Welsh clergyman	
Thomas Dove	Scholar	Also named as a Scholar in the 1571 charter	
John Higginson	Fellow	Also named as a Fellow of the college in the 1571 charter	
Robert Johnson	Fellow	Also named as a Fellow of the college in the 1571 charter	
Walter Jones	Scholar	Matriculated as a member of the college in November 1621, later becoming Sub-Dean of Westminster Abbey and Treasurer of Chichester Cathedral	
Robert Lloyd	Fellow	A Fellow of the college (1622–1637), but nothing else is known about him	
Hugh Madryn	Scholar	Matriculated as a member of the college in December 1621, later becoming rector of Newtown, Montgomeryshire	
Maurice Meyricke	Fellow	Registrar of the University (1600–1608) and a Fellow of New College, Oxford	
Willam Parry	Scholar	Matriculated as a member of the college in November 1621	
Theodore Price	Fellow and Commissioner	Principal of Hart Hall, Oxford (1604–1622)	
Thomas Prichard	Fellow	A Fellow of the college since 1615, appointed Vice-Principal in 1623	
William Prichard	Fellow	A former student of the college; Rector of Ewelme, Oxfordshire (1606–1629)	
Ambrose Thelwall	Scholar	Not found in the college records, but presumed to be a relative of Sir Eubule Thelwall	
Sir Eubule Thelwall	Principal and Commissioner	Master of the Court of Chancery (appointed 1617), and Principal from 1621 until his death in 1630	
William Thelwall	Scholar	Not found in the college records, but presumed to be a relative of Sir Eubule Thelwall	
