= John Garbrand =

John Garbrand may refer to:

- John Garbrand (priest) (a.k.a. Herks; 1542–1589), English prebendary of Salisbury Cathedral
- John Garbrand (writer) (1646/7–?), English political writer
