= Mary Knight (singer) =

- Born: 1631
- Died: Unknown
- Occupations: singer and poet

Mary Knight (1631 – in or after 1698) was an English singer and poet.

== Life ==
Knight was baptised in 1631 in the parish of St. Gregory, near St. Paul's Cathedral. Her father was Stephen Knight and her half brother was Henry Birkhead and Knight's mother had been married to John Birkhead before she married Knight's father. Her mother was said to have had eleven children but only she and her half brother survived childhood. Her half brother was educated by Thomas Farnabie and at Trinity College, Oxford.

Knight's education in singing seems to have happened later in her life. She was married first to Henry Geery at St Peter Paul's Wharf on 30 July 1649. They may have had a son but the marriage appears to have been abandoned as Knight was not referred to as Mrs or Mary Geery after this but as Mary Knight.

Knight's education in singing happened with Henry Lawes. Lawes organised concerts and Knight was invited to sing at the concerts. These were not public concerts but private affairs at Lawes house. Lawes himself would perform and Knight as Lawes's protege would sing as well. She was said to have the greatest range of any singer. In 1655 Lawes published his Second Book of Ayres and Dialogues and he included poems by Knight as well as verses by Sir John Berkenhead and the poet Katherine Philips.

Knight would go on to sing for the Queen and some say that she was a mistress of Charles II, but there appears to be no evidence. By the time of The Restoration of Charles II she was a famous singer and she was acknowledged in that role at court. Knight was giving public concerts in 1667 as Samuel Pepys notes in his diary that he had missed her singing at Gray's Inn Fields.

Charles II granted her a pension for life of £200 in 1672. This was continued by James II and she followed him for some years into his exile. When William III came to power her annuity stopped, but it continued on appeal but reduced to £100 per year.

Her half brother died in 1696 and under his 1694 will she was one of his executors. The will resulted in the creation of the Oxford Professor of Poetry in 1708.

It is not clear when Knight died but it was either in 1698 or after thus date.
