= Thomas Allen (mathematician) =

English mathematician and astrologer (1542–1632)

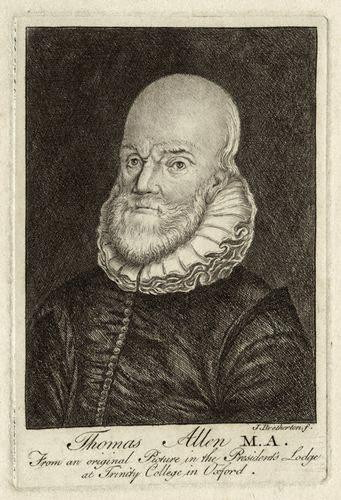
Thomas Allen, 18th-century engraving by James Bretherton

Thomas Allen (or Alleyn) (21 December 1542 – 30 September 1632) was an English mathematician and astrologer. Highly reputed in his lifetime, he published little, but was an active private teacher of mathematics. He was also well connected in the English intellectual networks of the period.

== Early life ==
He was born in Uttoxeter, Staffordshire. He was admitted scholar of Trinity College, Oxford, in 1561; and graduated as M.A. in 1567. In 1571 he left his college and fellowship, and moved to Gloucester Hall. He became known for his knowledge of antiquity, philosophy, and mathematics.

== At Gloucester Hall ==
Gloucester Hall suited Allen, a sympathiser at least with Catholicism, because there was no stringent religious observance required there; indeed there was no chapel in the Hall. Allen's beliefs have been classified as "church papist", but also his posture as "crypto-Catholic": a Catholic faith combined with outward conformity to the Church of England. He joined there his friends Edmund Reynolds, Miles Windsor, and George Napper, who had also left their colleges at a time of increasing religious tensions on Oxford; Napper was to be a Catholic martyr. Trinity shed six more of its Fellows within a few years.

Allen encouraged other scholars to migrate there, such as John Budden and William Burton. He had a wide range of pupils and followers: Kenelm Digby and Brian Twyne in natural philosophy, with Theodore Haak coming later. The mathematical school of Allen included Thomas Harriot and Walter Warner, and Sir John Davies (to whom Allen taught Catholic doctrine).

Mathematical geography was an important topical subject in which Allen was reputed, pursued by several groups in England, including another around Henry Briggs: Allen may have taught the geographer Richard Hakluyt. He did teach Robert Fludd and Sir Thomas Aylesbury. In the humanities there were Robert Hegge, and William Fulbecke. When the Camden Chair of Ancient History was being set up in the early 1620s, Allen successfully supported the candidacy of Degory Wheare with William Camden; and a few years later, in 1626, Wheare came to Gloucester Hall as Principal.

Allen died at Gloucester Hall.

== Other associations ==
Allen corresponded with Henry Percy, 9th Earl of Northumberland. Northumberland invited Allen to visit, and he spent some time with the Syon House group around the Earl; he became acquainted with Thomas Harriot, John Dee, and other mathematicians. He also knew well Sir Robert Cotton, William Camden, and their antiquarian associates. He pointed out the historian Æthelweard (Fabius Quaestor) to Camden.

== Astrologer ==
Allen was noted as astrologer to Robert Dudley, 1st Earl of Leicester, as Dee was for Queen Elizabeth. Foster believes Allen probably met Leicester through Lady Paulet, wife of Hugh Paulet, née Elizabeth Blount, who was the widow of Sir Thomas Pope, the founder of Trinity College, Oxford.

There is a surviving 62-page horoscope cast for the teenage Philip Sidney in the Ashmole manuscripts in the Bodleian Library, in the period 1570–2 when he was studying at Oxford, where Leicester was Chancellor, and it has been attributed to Allen; the case has also been made that it was by Dee. A link between the two is that Edward Kelley is said to have worked briefly for Allen. Allen definitely cast a natal horoscope for Robert Pierrepont (1584), and cast also for William Herbert, 3rd Earl of Pembroke, a later Chancellor of Oxford, in 1626.

== Reputation ==
Allen's skill in mathematics and astrology earned him the credit of being a magician. In an incident related in John Aubrey's Brief Lives, it was in a visit to Holme Lacy as the guest of Sir John Scudamore that the servants threw his ticking watch into the moat, thinking it the Devil. The author of Leicester's Commonwealth accuses him of employing the art of "figuring" to further the earl of Leicester's unlawful designs, and of endeavouring by the "black art" to bring about a match between his patron and the Queen. There Allen's name is coupled with Dee's as atheists, in a series of claims that Leicester found physicians and other lackeys for his evil-doing at Oxford and elsewhere.

After his death, funeral orations praising Allen were given by William Burton and George Bathurst (1610–1644). Burton's retailed the story of how Leicester had offered a bishopric to Allen, who declined the offer. Allen in fact was, by choice, not in holy orders.

== Works ==
He wrote a Latin commentary on the second and third books of Claudius Ptolemy of Pelusium, Concerning the Judgment of the Stars, or, as it is commonly called, Of the Quadripartite Construction, with an Exposition. He also wrote notes on John Bale's De Scriptoribus M. Britanniae.

== Library and legacy ==
Allen collected manuscripts relating to history, antiquity, astronomy and astrology, philosophy, and mathematics. At least 250 items from his library can still be traced. He also acquired manuscripts from dissolved monasteries, such as Reading Abbey, for which his sources may have been Gerbrand Harkes, the Protestant dealer, and Clement Burdett. While in Allen's possession, most of his manuscripts were unbound or had simple covers.

A considerable part of Allen's collection was presented to the Bodleian Library by Sir Kenelm Digby, to whom it had been left: over 200 manuscripts, which were rebound in calf. This bequest was strong in works by early English scientists, including Roger Bacon, Simon Bredon, John Eschenden, Robert Grosseteste, John Sharp, and Richard Wallingford. But Allen's library was in flux during his lifetime, as he lent or gave items, and was consulted by others. He was a significant supporter of Sir Thomas Bodley's effort to found the Library; and gave it a number of works. Some went to the Cottonian Library, presumably via Richard James. Sir Thomas Aylesbury, another former pupil, was another one of Allen's major legatees. The Cuthbert Gospel of St John, seen in his library by James Ussher, appears to have left his possession by 1622, as it is not in a catalogue of that date. Ussher wrote to Camden in 1606 of the help he had had from Allen's collection, consulting William of Malmesbury, and a papal bull from Giraldus Cambrensis via Johannes Rossus.
