= Thomas Prichard (priest, born c. 1591) =

Thomas Prichard (born c. 1591) was a Welsh clergyman and academic at the University of Oxford.

== Life ==
Prichard, from Pembrokeshire, matriculated at Jesus College, Oxford on 19 June 1610 at the age of 19. He obtained his BA degree on 4 November 1612 and his MA on 4 July 1615. He became a Fellow of the college at about this time, and his position was confirmed in the royal charter issued to the college in 1622. He obtained his BD and DD degrees on 9 July 1628. He held various benefices in Pembrokeshire, becoming a Prebendary of Brecon in 1629 and rector of Llandysul in Ceredigion in 1632.
