= William Prichard (priest) =

William Prichard (c. 1563 – 1629) was a Welsh clergyman and academic at the University of Oxford.

== Life ==
Prichard, from Monmouthshire, matriculated at Jesus College, Oxford on 1 November 1581 at the age of 18, obtaining his BA degree from Christ Church, Oxford on 14 June 1585 and his MA on 15 May 1588. He was university Proctor in 1595. He was appointed vicar of Abergavenny in 1589, vicar of Caerwent thereafter, and became rector of Ewelme, Oxfordshire in 1606 (holding this position until his death in 1629). He was also a canon of Sarum and of St Paul's, being appointed to these positions in 1620. He was appointed as a Fellow of Jesus College, Oxford by the royal charter of 1622.
