= Robert Lougher =

Welsh clergyman, lawyer and politician

Robert Lougher (died 1585) was a Welsh clergyman, lawyer and politician who sat in the House of Commons in 1572. He was twice Principal of New Inn Hall, Oxford.

== Life and career ==
Lougher was born in Tenby, Pembrokeshire, Wales, the youngest son of Thomas Lougher, alderman of Tenby. He became a fellow of All Souls College, Oxford in 1553, obtaining degrees of BCL in 1558 and DCL in 1565. He was ordained priest, and was appointed Archdeacon of Totnes in 1562.

Lougher was appointed Principal of New Inn Hall, Oxford in 1564, admitted to Doctors' Commons in 1565 and then became Regius Professor of Civil Law at Oxford University in 1566. He resigned his position at New Inn Hall in 1570. He was named in the 1571 foundation charter of Jesus College, Oxford as one of the original eight fellows. In 1572, although a cleric, he was elected member of parliament for Pembroke. He was again Principal of New Inn Hall from 1575 to 1580, after his successor, Dr Felix Lewes, had been removed for non-residence. In 1577, he was appointed official of the consistory and vicar-general in spirituals to Edwin Sandys, Archbishop of York. Lougher avoided repeating the offence of Felix Lewes, even though he simultaneously served also as Chancellor of the Diocese of Exeter, Archdeacon of Totnes, and Rector of three parishes in the county of Devon.

Lougher died in 1585 and was buried in Tenby.

Lougher married Elizabeth Rastall, daughter John Rastall at Tenby on 3 June 1583 or 1585. His son John Lougher also sat as MP for Pembroke.
