= Robert Bennet (bishop) =

English Anglican bishop

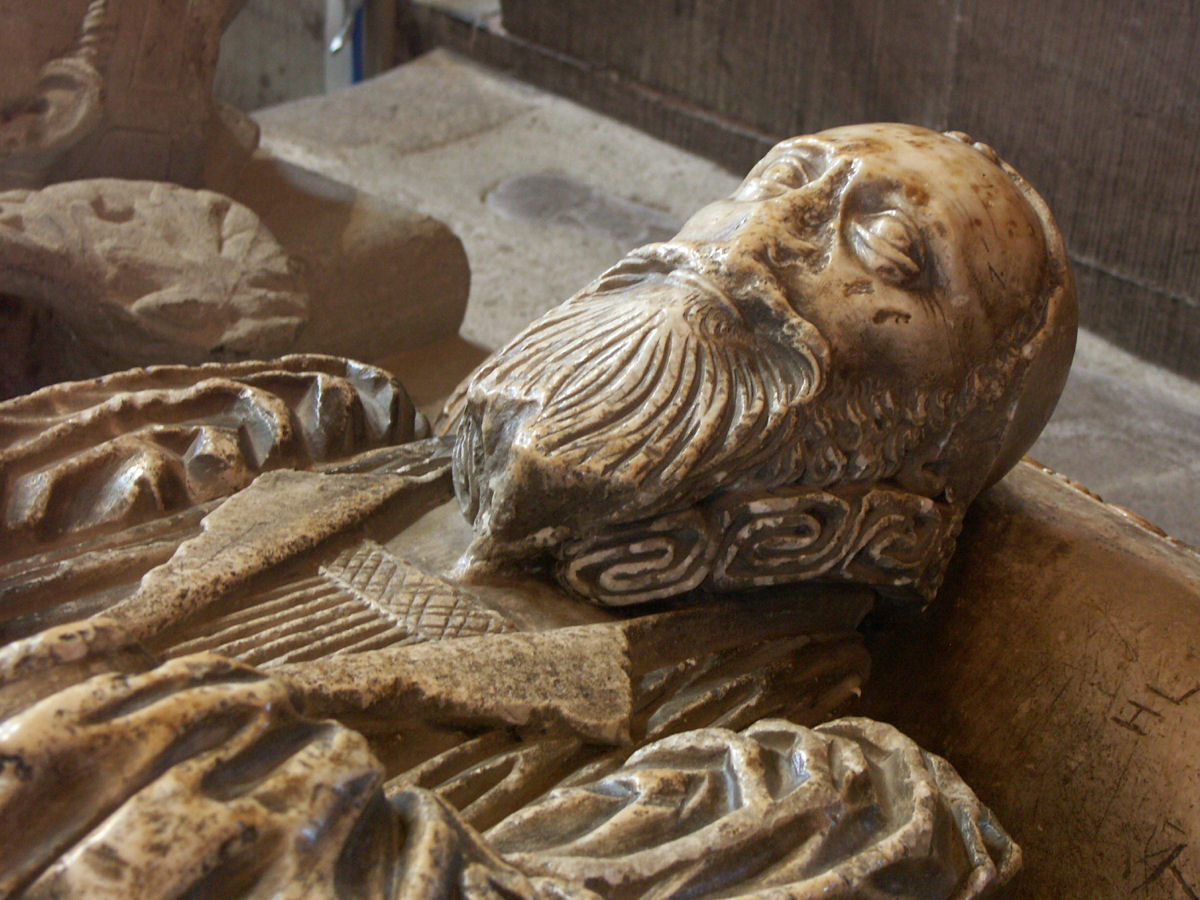
Bennet's effigy in Hereford Cathedral

Robert Bennet (Bennett) (died 1617) was an English Anglican bishop and the Dean of Windsor.

== Early Life ==
Bennet was born in Baldock, Hertfordshire to Leonard Bennet and his wife, Margaret Langley. He matriculated at Trinity College, Cambridge in 1563, graduating B.A. in 1567, and becoming a minor Fellow in the same year. He became a full Fellow in 1570, in which year he also gained his M.A,. He was incorporated at Oxford in 1572, at which time he opposed John Whitgift's redrafted Cambridge University statutes, and in 1576 he served as university preacher at Cambridge. As a young man he was noted for his good looks and as a royal tennis player. After obtaining his B.Th. in 1577, he was referred to as Erudito Benedicte because, in the words of John Harington, "'he would tosse an Argument in the Schools, better than a Ball in the Tennis-court".

== Later Life ==
In 1583, Bennet became master of the Hospital of St Cross in Winchester and left Cambridge. Together with Thomas Bilson, the warden of Winchester College, he became active in attempts to end Catholic recusancy. This work brought him to the attention of William Cecil, Lord Burghley, who appointed Bennet as one of his personal chaplains and, in March 1596, aided his appointment as Dean of Windsor in succession to William Day. He combined his work as dean with that as master of St Cross.

He offended Elizabeth I by preaching against her proposed marriage to François, Duke of Anjou.

Despite Bennet's opposition to royal demands that he cede property under his control, he was elected as Bishop of Hereford in January 1603. He had turned down the offer of the bishopric of Salisbury in 1598 because that had required him to alienate some of his property rights. He determined in his new role to continue his suppression of Catholic recusancy but was unsuccessful in persuading his superiors – such as James I – to grant the diocesan commission that he envisaged to be his instrument in achieving this end. His health began to fail, which he blamed on the "cold and rheumatic" climate of the diocese. He failed in his attempt to move to the vacant bishopric at Worcester in 1610 and subsequently used his position to promote evangelical work and to improve the education of clergymen, notably through the Leintwardin lecture.

== Death ==
Bennet was married but details of his wife are unknown. He left a substantial sum of money for his burial expenses and detailed instructions regarding what should be done at his death, which occurred in October 1617. (Note: The precise date of his death varies. The Oxford Dictionary of National Biography states 25 October 1617 and Cyndia Clegg says 12 October. An older source, published in 1796, gives the date as 2 October.) He had designed his own white alabaster effigy, which still exists in Hereford cathedral, where he was buried close to where his wife sat. His heir was a nephew, also called Robert Bennet, and his successor at Hereford was Francis Godwin, the author of numerous books including the remarkable piece of science fiction titled The Man in the Moone. He left money to the cathedral, Trinity College in Cambridge, Oxford University and the poor of various places, including that of his birth, Baldock,

Church of England titles
Preceded by Herbert Westphaling	Bishop of Hereford; 1603–1617	Succeeded by Francis Godwin
