= William Burton (antiquary, died 1657) =

English schoolmaster and antiquary

William Burton (1609–1657) was an English schoolmaster and antiquary, best known for his posthumously-published commentary on the Antonine Itinerary.

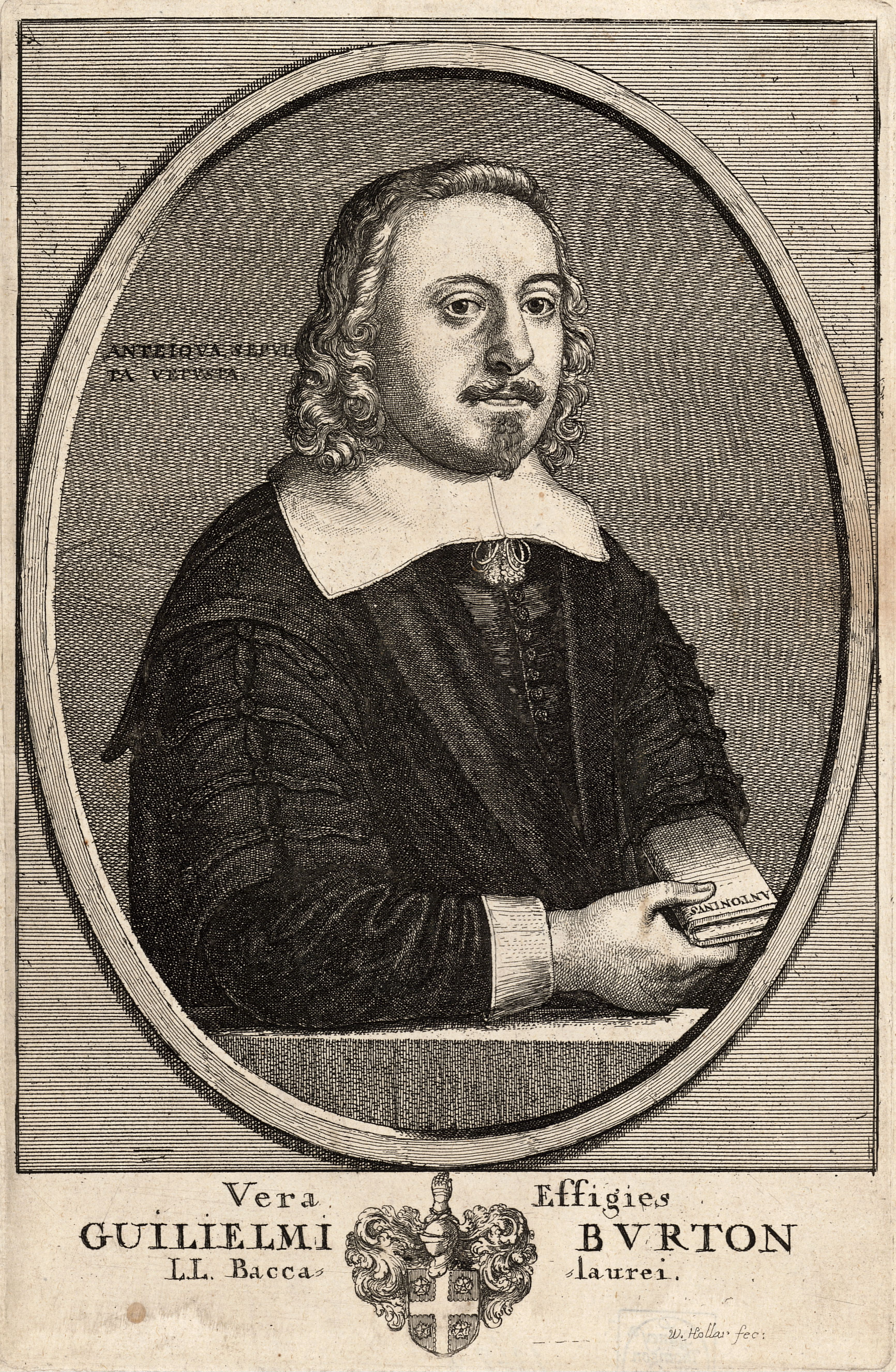
William Burton holds a book with inscription ANTONINUS, frontispiece portrait by Wenceslas Hollar.

== Life ==
The son of William Burton, sometime of Atcham, in Shropshire, he was born in Austin Friars, London, and educated at St. Paul's School. He became a student in Queen's College, Oxford, in 1625; but as he had not sufficient means, Thomas Allen, perceiving his merit, induced him to migrate to Gloucester Hall, and conferred on him a Greek lectureship there. He was a Pauline exhibitioner from 1624 to 1632. In 1630 he graduated B.C.L., but, poverty forcing him to leave the university, he became the assistant or usher of Thomas Farnaby, the schoolmaster.

Some years later he was appointed master of the free school at Kingston-upon-Thames, in Surrey, where he continued till two years before his death, when, suffering from dead palsy, he retired to London. He died on 28 December 1657, and was buried in a vault under the church of St. Clement Danes, in the Strand. White Kennett called him "the best topographer since Camden, while Anthony Wood relates James Ussher's high opinion of him.

== Works ==
His works are:

- In [laudem] doctissimi, clarissimi, optimi senis, Thomæ Alleni ultimo Septembris mdcxxxii Oxon iis demortui, exequiarum justis ab alma Academia postridie solutis, orationes binæ (the first by Burton, the second by George Bathurst), London, 1632
- Nobilissimi herois Dn. C. Howardi comitis Nottinghamiæ ἀποθέωσις ad illustrissimum V. Dn. C. Howardum, comitem Nottinghamiæ, fratrem superstitem (London, 1 April 1643), on a small sheet
- The beloved City: or, the Saints' Reign on Earth a Thousand Years, asserted and illustrated from 65 places of Holy Scripture, London 1643, translated from the Latin of Johann Heinrich Alsted
- Clement, the blessed Paul's fellow-labourer in the Gospel, his First Epistle to the Corinthians; being an effectuall Suasory to Peace, and Brotherly Condescension, after an unhappy Schism and Separation in that Church, London, 1647, 1652, translated from Patrick Young's Latin version, who has added "Certaine Annotations upon Clement"
- Græcæ Linguæ Historia (Veteris Linguæ Persicæ λείψανα) 2 parts, London, 1657
- A Commentary on Antoninus his Itinerary, or Journies of the Roman Empire, so far as it concerneth Britain, London, 1658. With portrait engraved by Wenceslaus Hollar, and a "Chorographicall Map of the severall Stations"
