= John Garbrand (writer) =

English writer

John Garbrand (born 1646 or 1647), was an English political writer.

Garbrand was born at Abingdon, Berkshire. His father, Tobias Garbrand, M.D., of Oxford, was principal of Gloucester Hall in Oxford.

Garbrand became a commoner of New Inn Hall, Oxford, in 1664. He received his B.A. degree on 28 Jan. 1667. Then he became a barrister at the Inner Temple in London.

Garbrand wrote several pieces that defended the Duke of York from charges of being a Catholic. "By the writing of which books," says Wood, "and his endeavours in them to clear the Duke of York from being a papist, he lost his practice, and could get nothing by it."

== Publications ==
- The grand Inquest; or a full and perfect Answer to several Reasons by which it is pretended his Royal Highness the Duke of York may be proved to be a Roman Catholic, 4to, London [1682?].
- The Royal Favourite cleared, &c., 4to, London, 1682.
- Clarior è Tenebris; or a Justification of two Books, the one printed under the Title of "The grand Inquest", &c.; the other under the Title of "The Royal Favourite cleared",’' &c., 4to, London, 1683.
