= Theodore Price =

Welsh Anglican clergyman and academic (c. 1570–1631)

Thedore Price (c. 1570 – 15 December 1631) was a Welsh Anglican clergyman and academic. He served as Principal of Hart Hall, Oxford for 18 years and was also a prebend of Westminster Abbey. However, after falling out with his patron, John Williams, he sided with William Laud and was reputed to have converted from Anglicanism to Roman Catholicism at the end of his life.

== Life ==
Price was the son of Rees ap Tudor and his wife Margory, who was the daughter of Edward Stanley (constable of Harlech Castle). Price was born in about 1570 in the parish of Llanenddwyn, Dyffyn Ardudwy in Merioneth, North Wales. After attending All Souls College, Oxford as a chorister, he transferred to Jesus College, graduating with a Bachelor of Arts degree on 16 February 1588 and obtaining his Master of Arts degree on 9 June 1591. After his ordination, he was appointed as rector of Llanfair, near Harlech, in 1591. He was appointed a prebendary of Winchester Cathedral in 1596 and rector of Llanrhaeadr-ym-Mochnant, Denbighshire in 1601. In 1604, he was appointed as Principal of Hart Hall, Oxford (the predecessor of Hertford College), holding this position until his resignation in 1622. He became rector of Launton, Oxfordshire in 1609 and obtained his Doctorate of Divinity, as a member of New College, Oxford, in 1614. He was one of the five commissioners appointed to draw up new statutes for Jesus College in 1621, and was made a Fellow of the college at that time.

Further positions came Price's way, with the influence of his kinsman John Williams, the future Archbishop of York: a prebend of Lincoln Cathedral, when Williams was the Bishop of Lincoln (1621), and a prebend of Westminster Abbey, where Williams was the Dean (1623). He was one of two clerics chosen in 1622 to serve on a commission sent to Ireland to explore grievances, including investigation of the state of the church. Although he was praised for his efforts, he did not receive further advancement, being passed over for appointment as Bishop of St Asaph in 1623 and 1629 and Bishop of Gloucester in 1624. He fell out with Williams over his failure to give Price full support in his attempt to become Archbishop of Armagh (the post going to James Ussher), with Williams pointing to Price's lack of preaching. Thereafter, Price sided with William Laud, the main opponent of Williams within the Westminster Abbey chapter, sharing Laud's like of ceremonial practices in religion.

== Death and will ==
Price died at Westminster on 15 December 1631 in circumstances that confirmed to some contemporaries the close link between Laudian ceremonials and Roman Catholicism. After unsuccessful surgery for "the Torment of the Stone", Price received Catholic visitors and told them of his "affection and devotion" for the Catholic Church. He received Catholic rites and refused to be attended by Anglican clergyman before his death. Price was buried at Westminster Abbey on 21 December 1631. It was said that the delay in burying Price was the reluctance of the prebendaries to conduct a burial service after Price's reported conversion. It was alleged that the story of Price's conversion had been invented by Williams to attack Laud's reputation. The Philip Herbert, 4th Earl of Pembroke was reported to have remarked to King Charles I, "Is this the Orthodox man your Majesty would have made a Bishop the last year? Do but mark him that recommended him unto you in that kind." However, at Laud's trial, when Laud was condemned for his familiarity with the "apostate" Price, Laud did not deny that Price had converted to Catholicism, but suggested that Williams had worked harder than he had for Price's advancement.

Price's religious preferences can be seen from his will in 1631, in which he bequeathed money to beautify the chancel of the church in Llanenddwyn and to add an altar rail, and to endow a sermon at Jesus College in support of bowing at the name of Jesus. He also left money to Hart Hall and Oriel College, Oxford. He referred to Laud as "my Noble Laud and worthie auntient friend", but did not refer to Williams.
