= David Lewis (lawyer) =

Member of the Parliament of England

David Lewis (c. 1520 – 27 April 1584) was a Welsh lawyer, judge, and the first Principal of Jesus College, Oxford.

== Early life ==
Lewis was born in Abergavenny, Monmouthshire, Wales. In 1540 he graduated from All Souls College, Oxford, as a Bachelor of Civil Law, and became a Fellow of All Souls in 1541.

== Career ==
In 1546 Lewis was appointed Principal of New Inn Hall, but he became an advocate in the Court of Arches in 1548 (after graduating DCL) and resigned his Oxford post in the same year. In 1549, he was admitted as an advocate to Doctors' Commons. He was a Master in the Court of Chancery from 1553, and was also one of the members of parliament for Steyning (26 October – December 1553) and Monmouthshire (8 November 1554 – January 1555).

Lewis was appointed a Judge of the High Court of Admiralty in 1558, and was involved in matters such as inquiries in 1564 into complaints of piracy against Spanish subjects, and an examination of Martin Frobisher in 1566 when Frobisher was suspected of fitting out a ship for piracy.

== Later life ==
He was appointed the first Principal of Jesus College on 27 June 1571, but left in 1572. During his time as Principal, he was one of the lawyers who signed an opinion concluding that an ambassador of Mary, Queen of Scots could be punished in England for intriguing against Queen Elizabeth. In 1575, he became a Commissioner of the Admiralty along with John Herbert.

He died unmarried and was buried in St Mary's Church, Abergavenny, in what is now known as the Lewis chapel.
