= Griffith Powell =

British philosopher (died 1620)

Griffith Powell (1561 – 15 June or 28 June 1620) was a philosopher and Principal of Jesus College, Oxford, from 1613 to 1620.

== Life ==
Powell was the third of four sons of John ap Hywel of Llansawel, Carmarthenshire, Wales. Powell matriculated at Jesus College in 1581, obtaining his BA in 1584, MA in 1589, and BCL in 1593. He was elected Fellow of the college in 1589. He effectively ran the college during the principalships of his two predecessors, Francis Bevans and John Williams. Williams deprived him of his Fellowship, but it was restored on the Chancellor's orders.

Powell wrote two volumes on Aristotelian philosophy, Analysis analyticorum posteriorum (1594) and De sophisticis elenchis (1598). He was awarded his DCL in 1599. During his time as Principal he "requested" various "worthy personages" to contribute to the construction of college buildings, in particular the chapel, hall, buttery and kitchen, and raised £838 12s 2d: £259 from merchants and gentry of London, £160 from citizens of Oxford, £341 from people in Wales and the borders, and £78 from seven members of the clergy in Wales (Richard Parry, Bishop of St Asaph, giving £66 13s 2d of this sum). The hall still retains the panelling, three tables and two benches from the time of this work. His careful approach to college finances also made it possible to increase the numbers of resident fellows and scholars, and the popularity of the college with students from South Wales in particular increased during his time as Principal.

He died in 1620 and was buried in the Church of St Michael at the Northgate near the College. He left his whole estate to the college; lands in Flintshire were bought with the proceeds, and these remained in college ownership until 1966. The college chapel was completed within a year of his death.
