= Henry Bould =

Henry Bould (or Bolde) (born c. 1602) was a Welsh academic at the University of Oxford in the 17th century.

== Life ==
Bould, from Caernarvonshire, Wales, matriculated at Jesus College, Oxford on 1 June 1621 at the age of 19, and obtained his BA degree on 19 November 1621. He was named as one of the scholars of the college's foundation in the royal charter issued by James I in 1622. He obtained his MA on 1 July 1624. He was appointed as a Fellow of the college in 1623, holding this position until 1638.
