= John Budden =

English jurist (1566–1620)

John Budden (1566–1620) was an English jurist, Regius Professor of Civil Law at Oxford, and Principal of Broadgates Hall.

== Life ==
He was the son of John Budden of Canford, Dorset—his birthplace. He entered Merton College, Oxford, in Michaelmas 1582, was admitted a scholar of Trinity College, Oxford, on 30 May 1583, and proceeded B.A. on 29 October 1586, M.A. on 27 June 1589, and B.C.L. and D.C.L. on 8 July 1602. At the request of Thomas Allen, he migrated to Gloucester Hall about 1587, and devoted himself to civil law.

Before 1602 he became philosophy reader at Magdalen College, held the office of Principal of New Inn Hall from 1609 to 1618, and was Regius professor of civil law, and principal of Broadgates Hall. He died at Broadgates Hall on 11 June 1620, and was buried in the neighbouring church of St. Aldate's.

== Works ==
He was the author of Latin lives of Bishop William Waynflete, Oxon. 1602, and of Archbishop John Morton, London, 1607. The former was published by William Bates, and was republished in the volume entitled Vitæ selectorum aliquot virorum, London, 1681. Budden also translated into Latin Thomas Bodley's Statutes of the Public Library and Sir Thomas Smith's De Republica Anglorum (1610; other editions in 1625, 1630 and 1641), and into English (from the French of Pierre Ayrault) A Discourse for Parents' Honour and Authority over their Children, London, 1614, dedicated to Tobias Matthew.
