= John Lloyd (judge) =

English dean and judge

Rev. John Lloyd DCL (1533–1607) was a Welsh lawyer, Judge of the High Court of Admiralty in London, board member of All Souls College, and a cofounder, along with Queen Elizabeth I, of the first Protestant College at the University of Oxford.

== Biography ==
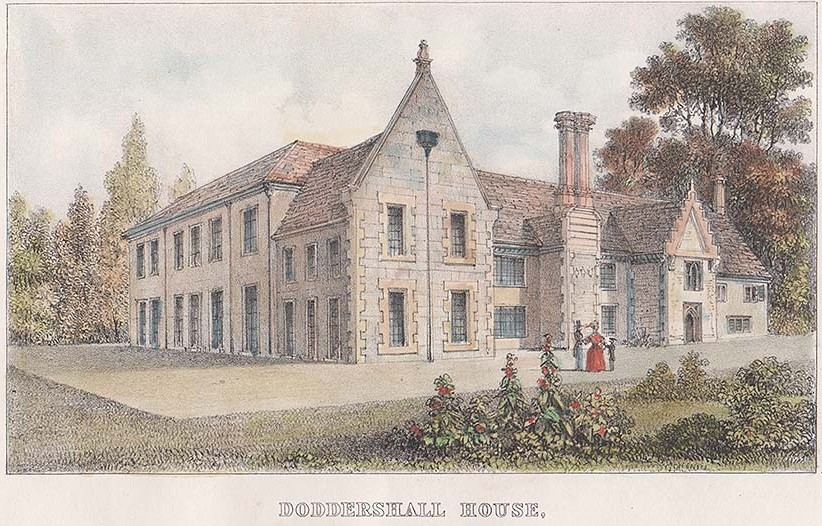
Doddershall House, Pigott family

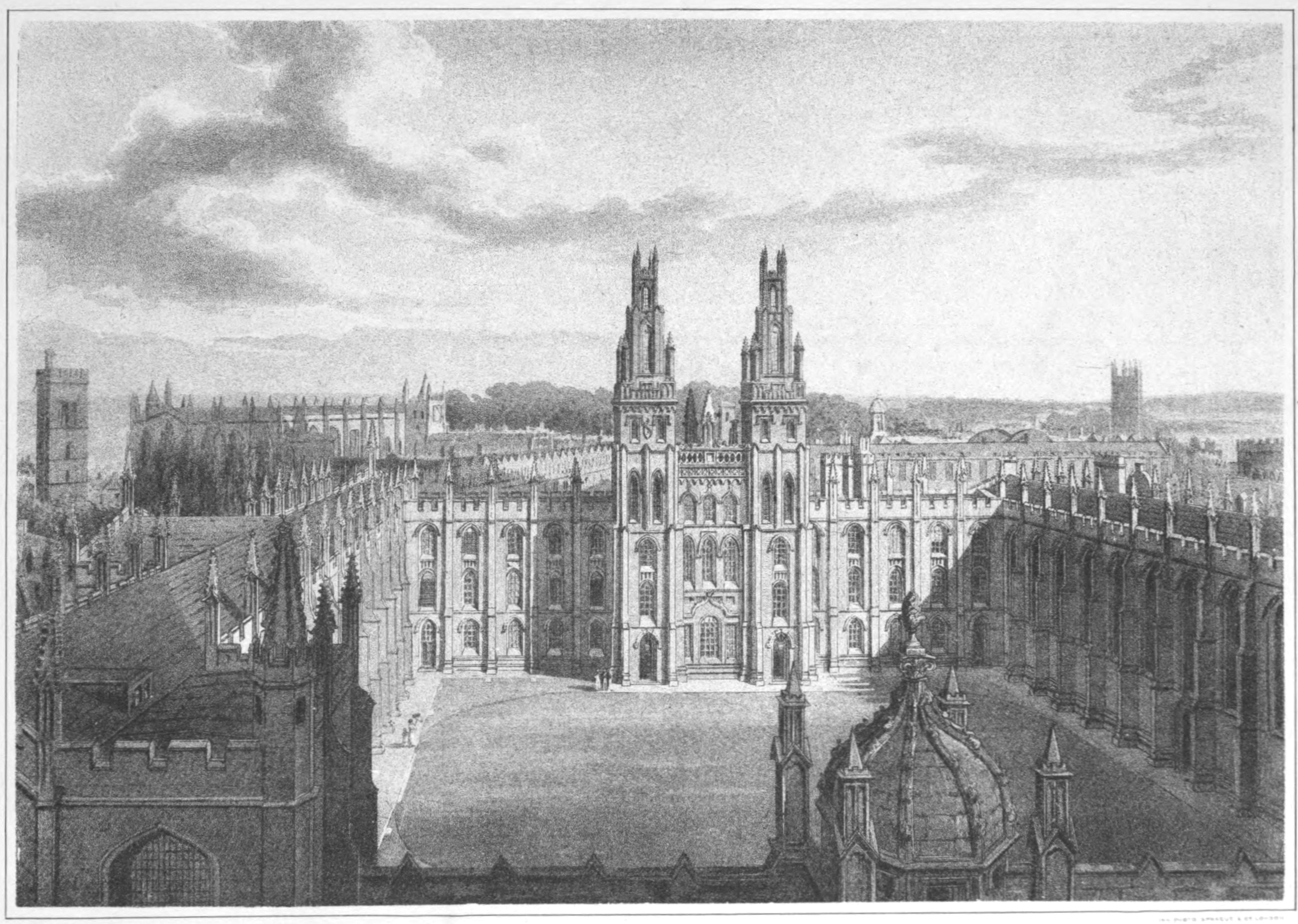
Oxford men and their colleges – All Souls'

John Lloyd was born in 1533, the third son of David Lloyd of Cevn Amwlch, in Lleyn, Carnarvonshire. He resided at Hartshorne, Derbyshire, and at his lodge in London. He married Elizabeth Pigott of Doddershall, daughter of the High Sheriff of Buckinghamshire, Thomas Pigott, born about 1510.

Lloyd's brother-in-law, Knight Thomas Pigott, married to a daughter of Lady Maud Parr, the cousin of Queen Katherine Parr. His nephew, MP Thomas Pigott, married the daughter of the Lord Mayor of London, Sir John Allot, while his niece, Elizabeth, married Sir Edward Phelips, the builder of Montacute House.

=== Career ===
Lloyd obtained his Bachelor of Arts degree from the University of Oxford in 1542. He was a Fellow of All Souls College, member of the governing body of Oxford University. He received the degrees of Bachelor of Civil Law in 1554 and Doctor of Civil Law in 1565. He became an advocate of the Canterbury Court of the Arches in 1566, and later, Judge of the High Court of Admiralty in London. Lloyd worked under Lord High Admirals, Edward Clinton, 1st Earl of Lincoln, husband of Elizabeth FitzGerald, and Charles Howard, 1st Earl of Nottingham, cousin of Elizabeth I and Anne Boleyn.

As a Judge of the High Court of Admiralty, Lloyd had to deal with maritime issues, such as acts of piracy, and captures of warfare vessels and merchant ships by enemies or competitors. He also had to settle the rights between merchants, seamen, and ship-owners. The Admiralty Court was considered a merchant's court, designed to protect the rights of traders, and dealt with the problems they encountered with pirates. Lloyd worked during an important period of change, the Tudor period, which marked the beginning of the British Empire.

With improvements in ship technology, capital financing, and with the discovery of new colonies around the world, Britain developed a policy of commercial and overseas expansion. The reforms of Henry VIII, and later of Elizabeth I, allowed the Admiralty Court to flourish as they were able to deal with more matters related to law and finance, such as commercial disputes, freight and charterparty, bills of exchange, lading, insurance, and hypothecation of ships. This opened the way for Lloyd, who was an ambitious lawyer, as they needed more Judges to deal with the increasing complexity of maritime trade.

=== Later life ===
In April 1559, Lloyd was appointed Dean of St Asaph in Wales but was removed from this position in November the same year. In 1571, he was named in a charter granted by Queen Elizabeth I as one of the eight founding fellows of Jesus College, Oxford. That College was the first Protestant college at the University of Oxford and was the only college created there by Elizabeth Tudor. Members of that charter, along with John Lloyd, were the Secretary of State, William Cecil of Burghley House; the Lord Chancellor of England, Sir Christopher Hatton of Holdenby Palace; the Lord Keeper of the Great Seal, Nicholas Bacon of Old Gorhambury House, and a few others.

There was in total 8 founding fellows, 8 founding commissioners, 8 founding scholars, and a Principal. In 1589, Elizabeth Tudor issued a new Charter, reducing the members from 22 to 13, making all of them Commissioners with no more Fellows or Scholars. John Lloyd was one the thirteen founding Commissioners appointed by the Queen and was promoted from Fellow to Commissioner. Before Jesus College was founded, Lloyd had also been the Principal of White Hall at the University of Oxford. He died in February 1607 and was buried in the Minster (church) at Chester Cathedral, in England.

== Family members ==
John Lloyd was a member of the Griffith family of Cevn Amwlch, who rose to power after challenging the supremacy of the Wynn family of Gwydir.

Coat of Arms of the Yale family of Plas-yn-Yale, in which the Lloyds married into

Members of his family included :

- John Griffith (MP for Beaumaris), Constable of Carnarvon Castle and Vice-Admiral of North Wales
- Sir John Griffith, grandson of Sir Richard Trevor of Trevalyn Hall, close friend of the 1st Earl of Nottingham
- Edmund Griffith, Bishop of Bangor, consecrated by the Archbishop of Canterbury, William Laud
- Sir Richard Bulkeley, son of the Chamberlain of North Wales, married to a granddaughter of 1st Earl of Worcester
- Lancelot Bulkeley, Archbishop of Dublin, elected on the Privy Council by King James VI and I
- Richard Bulkeley (died 1621), Constable of Beaumaris Castle, involved in the Babington Plot

=== Children ===
John Lloyd's children included :

- Frances Lloyd married to Dr. David Yale of Plas Grono, Chancellor of Chester, and nephew of Chancellor Thomas Yale.
  - One of their sons, Thomas Yale (1587–1619), became the grandfather of Governor Elihu Yale of Yale University. His widow, Ann Lloyd, daughter of Bishop George Lloyd, remarried after his death to Governor Theophilus Eaton.
- Mary Lloyd married to Sir Simon Weston, Knight of Lichfield and High Sheriff of Staffordshire.
  - Their only daughter Elizabeth married to the 2nd Earl of Londonderry, Robert Ridgeway, son of Thomas Ridgeway, 1st Earl of Londonderry.
