= Gerbrand Harkes =

Gerbrand Harkes (also Garbrand Herks, Harks, Harcks, etc.) (fl. 1538–1593) was a Dutch Protestant who became a bookseller and dealer in manuscripts in England.

== Life ==
Harks was born around 1510 in the Low Countries. He was an early convert to Calvinism and in 1538 fled to Protestant England, where he settled as a bookseller at Bulkeley Hall, since incorporated into Oriel College, Oxford. At the beginning of Edward VI's reign he purchased many libraries from the suppressed monasteries, some of which subsequently entered the Bodleian Library. As early as 1551 he regularly supplied books to Magdalen College. In addition to his bookselling business he also sold stationery, becoming official stationer to the University, and in 1546 was licensed to sell wine as well.

In 1556 Harkes's house was a meeting place for Protestants who, on account of the Marian Persecutions, worshipped in a cellar there.

In 1593, Harks was still alive, as he acquired five shops, two cellars, and two acres of meadow. His will, made on 5 August 1592, was proved on 3 May 1596.

== Family ==
Harkes had a number of sons, some of whom carried on the bookselling business in the later years of the century.

- Richard Garbrand was admitted a bookseller at Oxford 5 December 1573, and was alive in 1590.
- Thomas, born in 1539, was probationary fellow of Magdalen College from 1557 to 1570 (B.A. 1558, M.A. 1562), and was senior proctor 1565–6.
- John Garbrand, born 1541/2, was a cleric and the literary executor of John Jewel.
- William, born in 1549, was also fellow of Magdalen from 1570 to 1577 (B.A. 1570, M.A. 1574), when he seems to have been suspended for insubordination.

Four members of the third generation of the same family are well known.

- Ambrose, born at Oxford in 1584, received the privileges of an Oxford citizen in 1601, and in 1616 was a chief officer of the London Stationers' Company.
- John, born in 1585, was a scholar of Winchester College in 1596, fellow of New College, Oxford, from 1606 to 1608 (B.A. in 1603–4, M.A. in 1608), and pursued the bookseller's trade at Oxford, dying about 1618, when his widow Martha remarried Christopher Rogers, principal of New Inn Hall.
- The eldest son of Richard was the Reverend Tobias Garbrand (1579-1638). A Demy of Magdalen in 1591, earning an M.A. and a B.D., he was elected a Fellow of the College in 1605 and Vice-President in 1618. In 1619 he became vicar of Findon in Sussex, a post he held for the rest of his life. His will was proved on 13 November 1638
- Richard's youngest son Nicholas Garbrand, born in 1600, was also at Magdalen. He was demy 1614–19, fellow from 1619 to 1639 (B.A. 1618, M.A. 1621, B.D. 1631); vicar of Washington, Sussex, 2 September 1638 to 1671, vicar of Patching, Sussex, 1660–71, prebendary of Chichester 1660–9.
- Susanna Garbrand, daughter of Richard, became the wife of the Rev. Thomas Hooker, founder of Connecticut.

As late as the end of the seventeenth century the family name was often written Garbrand, alias Herks.
