= John Higginson (fellow) =

John Higginson (fl. 1561–1622) was one of the eight founding fellows of Jesus College, Oxford in 1571. He matriculated from Trinity College, Cambridge in 1561, obtaining his BA degree in 1565 and his MA in 1568. He was appointed vicar of Claybrooke, Leicestershire, England in 1571 and ordained priest in 1572. He was still alive at the time of the grant to Jesus College of its third charter by King James I in 1622.
