= Francis Bevans =

Francis Bevans (1530 – 3 June 1602) was a Welsh lawyer who was Principal of Jesus College, Oxford, from 1586 to 1602.

== Life ==
Bevans was born in 1530 Carmarthen in Wales. He became a Fellow of All Souls College, Oxford in 1573. He gained a B.C.L. in 1579, a Cambridge LL.B. in 1581, and an Oxford D.C.L. in 1583.

Bevans was Principal of New Inn Hall, Oxford in 1585–6, and Principal of Jesus College from 1586 to 1602. He was also chancellor to Herbert Westfaling, Bishop of Hereford, and so spent much of his time as Principal in Hereford. In his absence, Griffith Powell (who was to become Principal himself in 1613) effectively ran the college during much of the time that Bevan was Principal. Bevans died in Hereford, England, in 1602, the same year as Westfaling.
