= John Cotterell =

English clergyman and academic

John Cotterell DCL (died 1572) was an English clergyman and academic at the University of Oxford, who was one of the founding fellows of Jesus College, Oxford.

== Life and career ==
Cotterell, who was from Wiltshire, England, originally, was a Fellow of New College, Oxford, from 1524 to 1542, obtaining his BCL degree in 1532. He obtained his DCL in 1543. He was Rector of Winford, Somerset from 1524 until his death in 1572 and held other ecclesiastical positions: vicar of Adderbury, Oxfordshire (1542); rector of Everleigh, Wiltshire (1546); rector of Burton Bradstock, Dorset (1550); rector of Tidcombe, Tiverton, Devon (1562). He was Archdeacon of Dorset 1550–71, and Archdeacon of Wells 1554–72. He was appointed Prebendary of Bristol in 1545, of Wells in 1554 (until 1572) and of Lincoln in 1555 (until 1560).

Aside from his church duties, Cotterell was also involved with the University of Oxford. He was Principal of White Hall and Laurence Hall (1537–43). In 1571, Cotterell was named in the charter granted by Queen Elizabeth I as one of the eight founding fellows of Jesus College, Oxford.
