= Thomas Huyck =

Rev. Thomas Huyck DCL (died 1575) was Chancellor of the Diocese of London for 13 years and one of the founding fellows of Jesus College, Oxford.

== Life ==
Huyck was appointed as a Canon of St David's in 1551. He was also Rector of Buckland Dinham, Somerset from 1551 to 1554. He became an advocate at Doctor's Commons in 1554, the same year that he obtained his BCL and DCL degrees from Merton College, Oxford. In 1561, he was appointed Chancellor of the Diocese of London, a position he held until 1574. In 1571, Huyck was named in the charter granted by Queen Elizabeth I as one of the eight founding fellows of Jesus College, Oxford.
