= Henry Birkhead =

17th-century English academic, lawyer and Latin poet

Henry Birkhead (1617?–1696) was an English academic, lawyer and Latin poet. He is now known as the founder of the Oxford Chair of Poetry.

== Life ==
Birkhead was born in the parish of St. Gregory, near St. Paul's Cathedral, London. His parents were Margaret and John Birkhead. His father died and his mother remarried and his half sister was the singer Mary Knight. His mother was said to have had eleven children but only Mary and Henry survived childhood. Having been educated in grammar learning by Thomas Farnabie, he became a commoner of Trinity College, Oxford, in Midsummer term 1633, and was admitted scholar on 28 May 1635. A convert to Catholicism, he shortly afterwards entered the college of St. Omer; but his conversion was short-lived.

In 1638, by the influence of Archbishop William Laud, he was elected fellow of All Souls College, Oxford, being by then bachelor of arts. After taking his master's degree (5 June 1641), he devoted himself to the study of law. In May 1643 he submitted to the authority of the visitors appointed by parliament. In 1653 he was allowed by the delegates of the university to propose a dispensation in convocation for taking the degree of doctor of physic by accumulation, provided that he should perform the necessary exercises; but it is uncertain whether he took the degree.

He resigned his fellowship in 1657, and at the Restoration became registrar of the diocese of Norwich, an office which he continued to hold until 1681. He also had a chamber in the Middle Temple, where he frequently resided. He died on Michaelmas Eve, 1696, and was buried at St. Margaret's Church, Westminster. Mary, his half sister, was one of his executors under his 1694 will. The professorship of poetry at Oxford was founded in 1708 from funds bequeathed by Birkhead.

== Works ==
In 1645 he issued at Oxford 'Poemata,' printed for private circulation. In 1656 appeared 'Poematia in Elegiaca, Iambica, Polymetra Antitechnemata et Metaphrases membratim quadripertita,' Oxonii, 8vo. He joined with Henry Stubbe, of Christ Church, Oxford in publishing another volume of Latin verse in the same year. Birkhead also edited, with a preface, some philological works of Henry Jacob the younger in 1652; and wrote several royalist Latin elegies to persons who had suffered for their devotion to Charles I. An unpublished allegorical play by Birkhead, 'The Female Rebellion,' is preserved among the Tanner MSS. (466). In 1643 there was published at Oxford a collection of verses for Sir Bevil Grenville. Birkhead was one of the contributors to this collection, which included elegies by Jasper Mayne, William Cartwright, Dudley Digges, and others. Forty-one years afterward, in 1684, the collection was reprinted, and Birkhead, the only survivor save one of the thirteen contributors, addressed a long 'Epistle Dedicatory' to John Granville, 1st Earl of Bath, son of Sir Bevill Grenvill.
