= Thomas Farnaby =

English schoolmaster and scholar (c. 1575 – 1647)

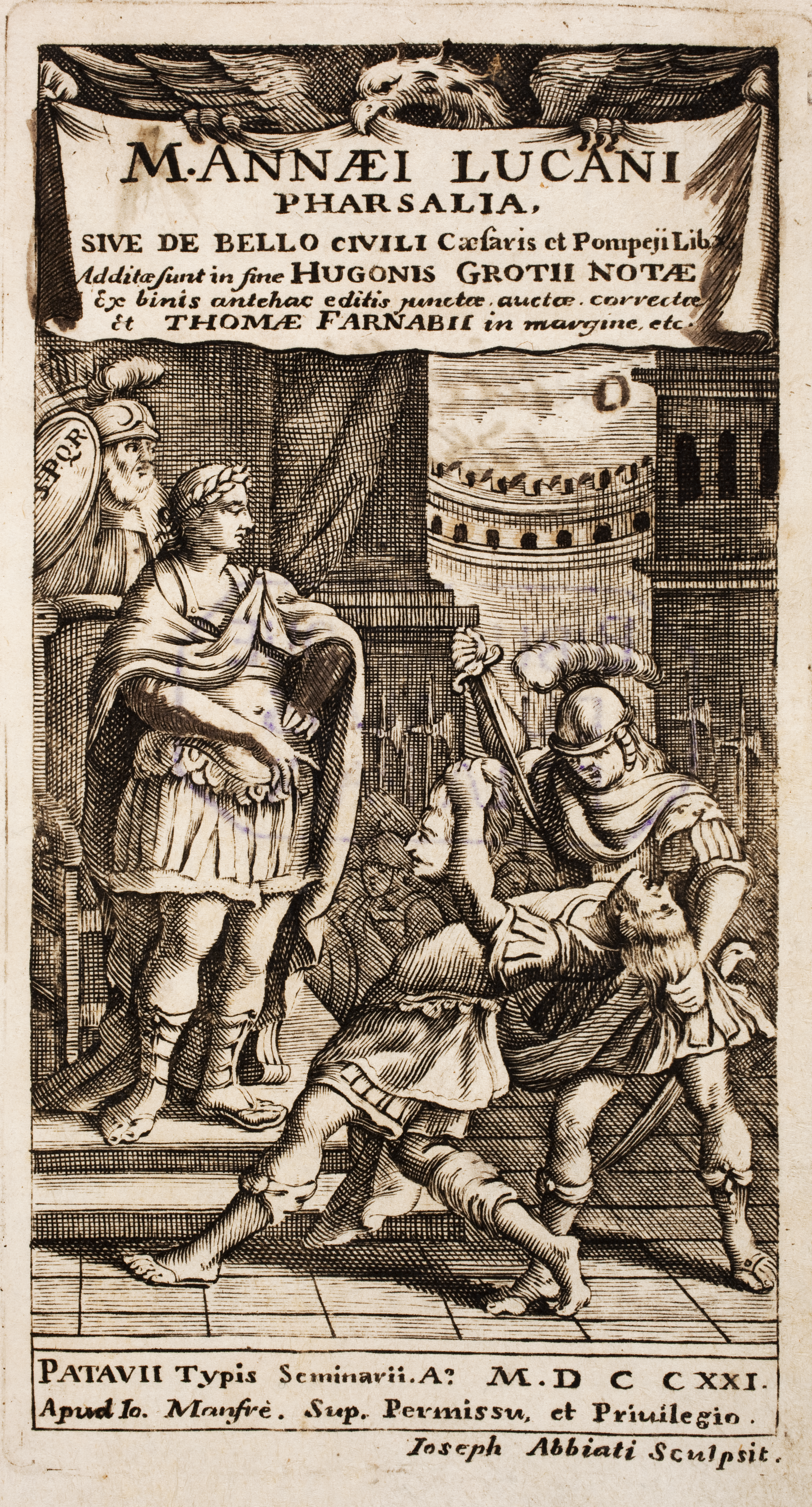
Title page of M. Annaei Lucani Pharsalia, sive De bello civili Cæsaris et Pompeji lib X, corrections by Farnaby.

Thomas Farnaby (or Farnabie) (c. 1575 – 12 June 1647) was an English schoolmaster and scholar. He operated a successful school in the Cripplegate ward of London and enjoyed great success with his annotations of classic Latin authors and textbooks on rhetoric and Latin grammar.

== Early life ==
He was the son of a London carpenter. His grandfather had been mayor of Truro and his great-grandfather an Italian musician. He may have been related to Giles Farnaby (1563–1640), the musician and composer, whose father was a joiner.

Between 1590 and 1595 he appears successively as a student of Merton College, Oxford, a pupil in a Jesuit college in Spain, a student at Cambridge, and a follower of Francis Drake and John Hawkins. After some military service in the Low Countries he made shift, says Anthony Wood, to be set on shore in the western part of England; where, after some wandering to and fro under the name of Thomas Bainrafe, the anagram of his surname, he settled at Martock, in Somersetshire, and taught the grammar school there for some time with success.

== Schoolmaster ==
He opened his own school in Goldsmiths Rents, Cripplegate, London at the beginning of the seventeenth century. This school was a success, in terms of reputation and also financially, and had many pupils, drawing on the sons of nobility. He had boarders as well as day scholars, held his classes in a large garden-house, and joined several houses and gardens together to meet the needs of his establishment. He had a small staff at work with him; in 1630 William Burton (1609–1657), a well-known antiquarian scholar, was one of his assistants. Sir John Bramston the younger, with his brothers, Mountfort and Francis, were among his boarders, and he described the school in his autobiography. Sir Richard Fanshawe, Alexander Gill, and Henry Birkhead were also Farnaby's pupils.

From this school, which had as many as 300 pupils, there issued, says Wood, more churchmen and statesmen than from any school taught by one man in England. In the course of his London career he was made master of arts of Cambridge, and soon after was incorporated at Oxford.

Such was his success that he was enabled to buy an estate at Otford near Sevenoaks, Kent, to which he retired from London in 1636, while carrying on as schoolmaster. In course of time he added to his Otford estate and bought another near Horsham in Sussex.

== Later life ==
In politics he was a royalist; and, suspected of participation in the rising near Tunbridge, 1643, he was arrested by the parliamentarians, and was committed to Newgate Prison. He was placed on board ship with a view to his transportation to America, but was ultimately sent to Ely House, Holborn, where he was detained for a year. He was allowed to return to Sevenoaks in 1645, and he died there 12 June 1647, being buried in the chancel of the church.

The details of his life were derived by Anthony Wood from Francis, Farnaby's son by a second marriage.

== Works ==
Farnaby was a leading classical scholar as well as the outstanding schoolmaster of his time. His works chiefly consisted of annotated editions of Latin authors Juvenal, Persius, Seneca, Martial, Lucan, Virgil, Ovid and Terence, which enjoyed great popularity. He is also the author of textbooks on rhetoric and Latin grammar. His editions of the classics, with elaborate Latin notes, were very popular throughout the seventeenth century. He edited Juvenal's and Persius's satires (Lond. 1612, dedicated to Henry, prince of Wales, 1620, 1633, 1685 tenth ed.); Seneca's tragedies (Lond. 1613, 1624, 1678 ninth ed., 1713, 1728); Martial's 'Epigrams' (Lond. 1615, Geneva, 1623, Lond. 1624, 1633, 1670, seventh ed.); Lucan's 'Pharsalia' (Lond. 1618, 1624, 1659, seventh ed.); Virgil's works (1634, dedicated to William Craven, Earl of Craven of Hamsted, and 1661); Ovid's Metamorphoses (Lond. 1637, 1650, 1677, 1739); Terence's comedies, ed. Farnaby and Meric Casaubon (Amsterdam, 1651, 1669, 1686, 1728, Saumur, 1671).

Farnaby's other works are:

- Index Rhetoricus Scholis et Institutioni tenerioris ætatis accommodatus, London, 1625; 2nd ed. 1633; 3rd ed. 1640; 4th ed. 1646; 15th ed. 1767; reissued in 1640 as Index Rhetoricus et Oratoricus cum Formulis Oratoriis et Indice Poetico, and epitomised by T. Stephens in 1660 for Bury St. Edmunds school under the title Tροποσκηματολογία.
- Phrases Oratoriæ elegantiores et poeticæ, London, 1628, 8th ed.
- Ἡ τῆς Ἀνθολογίας Ἀνθολογία, Florilegium Epigrammatum Græcorum eorumque Latino versu a variis redditorum, London, 1629, 1650, 1671.
- Systema Grammaticum, London, 1641; the authorised Latin grammar prepared by royal order.
- Phrasiologia Anglo-Latina, London, n.d. 6. Tabulæ Græcæ Linguæ, London, n.d.
- Syntaxis, London, n.d.

A patent dated 6 April 1632 granted Farnaby exclusive rights in all his books for twenty-one years, and on the back of the title-page of the 1633 edition of the Index Rhetoricus penalties are threatened against any infringement of Farnaby's copyright.

Letters from G. J. Vossius to Farnaby appear in Vossius's Epistolæ; and four of Farnaby's letters to Vossius are printed in Vossius's Epistolæ Clarorum Virorum. Other letters appear in John Borough's Impetus Juveniles (1643), and in Barten Holyday's Juvenal. Farnaby prefixed verses in Greek with an English translation to Thomas Coryat's Crudities, and he wrote commendatory lines for William Camden's Annales. Ben Jonson was a friend of Farnaby, and contributed commendatory Latin elegiacs to his edition of Juvenal and Persius. John Owen praises Farnaby's Seneca in his Epigrams. He is highly commended in Dunbar's Epigrammata, 1616, and in Richard Bruch's Epigrammatum Hecatontades duæ, 1627.

== Family ==
Farnaby married, first, Susan, daughter of John Pierce of Lancells, Cornwall; and secondly, Anne, daughter of John Howson, bishop of Oxford, afterwards of Durham. By his first wife he had (besides a daughter Judith, wife to William Bladwell, a London merchant) a son, John, captain in the king's army, who inherited his father's Horsham property, and died there early in 1673. By his second wife he had, among other children, a son Francis, born about 1630, who inherited the Kippington estate, Sevenoaks, and was a widower on 26 January 1663, when he obtained a license to marry Mrs. Judith Nicholl of St. James, Clerkenwell.

== Sources ==
- This article incorporates text from a publication now in the public domain: Stephen, Leslie, ed. (1889). "Farnaby, Thomas". Dictionary of National Biography. Vol. 18. London: Smith, Elder & Co.
