= John Garbrand (priest) =

English cleric (1542–1589)

John Garbrand or Herks (1542–1589) was an English cleric, a prebendary of Salisbury Cathedral a and friend of Bishop Jewell.

== Life ==
Garbrand was born in Oxford. His father, Garbrand Herks or Herks Garbrand, was a Dutch Protestant who had fled from religious persecution in his native country, and settled as a bookseller at Bulkeley Hall, in St. Mary's parish, Oxford.

John, the third son, entered Winchester College in 1556, was admitted probationary fellow of New College, Oxford, 24 March 1560, and perpetual fellow in 1562, proceeding B.A. 22 April 1563, and M.A. 25 Feb. 1566–7. In 1565 Bishop John Jewel, who was friendly with Garbrand's father, presented him to a prebendal stall in Salisbury Cathedral, where he subsequently held two other prebends. In 1567 he left Oxford to become rector of North Crawley, Buckinghamshire. In 1568 he was incorporated M.A. at Cambridge, and on 5 July 1582 proceeded B.D. and D.D. at Oxford. Until 1578 he was a prebendary of Wells Cathedral, and for some time he was rector of Farthingstone, Northamptonshire, to the poor of which parish he gave £5. He died at North Crawley on 17 November 1589, and was buried in the church. An inscription describes him as "a benefactor to the poor".

Like his father and his patron Jewel, Garbrand was a Puritan. When Jewel died in 1571 he bequeathed his papers to Garbrand, who by will devised them to Dr. Robert Chaloner and Dr. John Rainolds.

== Works ==
Garbrand edited from Jewel's manuscripts three volumes of works by the bishop:

- 'A View of a Seditious Bul' and 'A short Treatise of the Holie Scriptures,’ London, 1582, with preface by Garbrand.
- 'Certaine Sermons preached … at Paules Crosse' and 'A Treatise of the Sacraments,’ London, 1583, with dedication by the editor to Lords Burghley and Leicester, and Latin verses before the treatise.
- 'Exposition upon Paul's two epistles to the Thessalonians,’ London, 1583, with dedication by Garbrand to Sir Francis Walsingham.

Garbrand wrote prefatory Latin verses for Wilson's 'Discourse upon Usurie,’ 1572. Six letters in Dutch, dated 1586, from J. Garbront to Herle, concerning naval affairs, are in British Library Cat. Cotton. MS. Galba C. ix. ff. 253, 265, 283. Garbrand bequeathed some books to New College, Oxford.
