= Protestantism in the United Kingdom =

Protestantism (part of Christianity) is the largest denomination of Christianity religious demographic in the United Kingdom, and is made up of the Anglican (Church of England, Church of Scotland) and nonconformist (Methodism, Free Church, Baptist, Quakers, etc) branches of the Christian Church.

Before Protestantism reached England, the Roman Catholic Church was the established state church. Scotland, Wales and Ireland were also closely tied to Roman Catholicism. During the 16th century, the English Reformation and the Scottish Reformation in differing ways resulted in both countries becoming Protestant while the Reformation in Ireland did not enjoy the same degree of popular support.

Protestantism influenced many of England's monarchs in the 16th and 17th centuries, including Henry VIII, Edward VI, Elizabeth I and James I. Persecution was frequent for followers whose faith differed from that of the reigning monarch and violence and death was commonplace for the first 100 years of the Reformation. Reformers and early church leaders were persecuted in the first decades of the Reformation, but the non-conformist movement survived nonetheless.

As a result of the Reformation, Protestantism is the most widely practiced branch of Christianity in the modern United Kingdom, even though active participation in the church has declined in recent years.

== Overview ==
Christianity is the largest religion in the world. It is mainly split into three large branches, the Catholic Church, the Eastern Orthodox Church and the Protestant Church. The Protestant Church is the youngest of these, resulting from the Reformation of 1517 which was in protest of major problems within the Roman Catholic Church. In England and Wales, Protestantism was definitively established in the 1530s when Henry VIII separated the Church of England from Rome.

The Protestant church does not have one human leader and groups have divided off into denominations with different Christian beliefs. Prominent branches include Anglicanism, the Reformed tradition (including Presbyterianism and Congregationalism), Methodism, Pentecostalism and Baptists.

For centuries, Protestantism has played a crucial role in shaping political and religious life throughout Europe and beyond. The Protestant Reformation began in the early 16th century with Martin Luther, a German monk and philosopher. It developed further on the island of Great Britain, especially in England, and produced many notable figures.

== United Kingdom before the Reformation ==
Before protestant ideas reached England, the Roman Catholic Church was the established religion. Scotland, Wales and Ireland were also closely tied to Roman Catholicism. Despite the established and dominant position of the Roman Catholic Church, the proto-Protestant Lollard movement, founded by John Wycliffe, had considerable followers in England and some in Scotland from the 14th to the 16th century.

== Early Reformation ==
=== English language ===
In Catholic England, the only Bible authorised for use was written in Latin Vulgate, a translation of proper Latin considered holy by the Roman Catholic Church. As a result, only clergy had access to copies of the Bible. Ordinary citizens were dependent on their local priests for the reading of scripture because they could not read the text for themselves. Early in the Reformation, one of the fundamental disagreements between the Roman Church and Protestant leaders was over the distribution of the Bible in the people's common language.

In the 14th century, John Wycliffe helped make the Bible available to all English-speaking people, regardless of their wealth or social standing. Wycliffe translated the whole Bible into the English language because he believed that Englishmen needed to be familiar with the scriptures on their own terms in order to know Jesus Christ. Wycliffe was supported politically by John of Gaunt, the son of King Edward III, who held considerable power in government during the last several years of his father's reign (owing to his poor health) and throughout the minority rule of his nephew Richard II. Historians are divided on if the alliance between the two men was due to unorthodox religious views on Gaunt's part, mere political expediency for both of them, or some combination thereof.

Later, the invention of the printing press made it easier for reformers to share copies of the new Bible. In 1526, William Tyndale published the first complete Bible in print. This facilitated distribution at a lower cost, and soon the Bible was not only readable to English citizens, but also affordable for most people. Once the common people had access to the Bible, many left the Catholic church and joined the Protestant Church. The rapid growth in biblical reading was a notable event of the Reformation. Soon several new Protestant doctrines were emerging that challenged the Roman Catholic Church. Leading reformers and philosophers of the time helped establish these doctrines by preaching to large groups of people.

=== Religious controversies ===
Transubstantiation – Catholics believe that when they participate in the Eucharist, the bread and wine transform into the literal body and blood of Jesus Christ when the priest prays over it. All Protestant leaders rejected this belief as false.

Monasticism – Many Protestant leaders believed this was unnecessary for salvation and harmful to those who practised it.

The practice of penance and the belief that good works could balance the punishment of sin or lead to salvation were particularly common. Protestants rejected this doctrine, believing that good works alone could not allow one to enter heaven.

Scriptures – The Catholic church used the Bible as well as other literature written within the first decades of Jesus' death. Protestants believe that the Bible is the only holy word of God and rely on the doctrines of sola scriptura, sola fide and sola gratia.

These differences led to the emergence of a new alternative to Catholicism in the British Isles. They continue to be debated to this day.

== Protestant influence on politics ==
=== Monarchs ===
During the 16th and 17th centuries, nearly all the monarchs and resulting governments of Scotland, Ireland, and England were defined as being either Catholic or Protestant.

Henry VIII was the first monarch to introduce a new state religion to the English. In 1532, he wanted to have his marriage to his wife, Catherine of Aragon, annulled. When Pope Clement VII refused to consent to the annulment, Henry VIII decided to separate the entire country of England from the Roman Catholic Church. The Pope had no more authority over the people of England; this parting of ways allowed for Protestantism to enter the country.

Henry VIII established the Church of England after his split with the Pope. However, England stayed much the same, even with the new state religion. Its doctrines and practices were, at first, very similar to those of the Catholic Church. The King made two visible differences to show his authority over the new church; priests and monks were now allowed to marry, and monasteries (and any valuables inside them) were seen to belong to the King to use as he wished. The King did not establish this Anglican Church as a result of religious differences with Catholicism; his motives were mainly political, and he persecuted radical Protestants who threatened his new church.

Henry VIII's successor, his son Edward VI, supported the Reformation, but his belief was spiritual as well as political. He was more devout in his faith, and persecution of Protestant subjects ceased.

Under his sister Queen Mary I, however, Protestants were persecuted once again. She was raised Catholic, and saw it as her duty to purge the evil of Protestantism from her country. During her reign, reformers of the church, such as Thomas Hawkes, Hugh Latimer, Nicholas Ridley, Thomas Cranmer, and George Wishart, were executed for their faith. These executions did not heavily hinder the Protestant movement. In fact, many joined the church when they saw how committed these martyrs were to their religion.

The next monarch, Elizabeth I, was a Protestant. Under her rule, the Protestant Church flourished. Protestants now filled many leadership positions in government. With this new power, however, came the persecution of many Catholics. As new branches of Protestantism (such as the Presbyterian church) grew, similarities between the Catholic and Protestant churches steadily decreased during this time.

The reign of King James I established a certain future for Protestantism in England. The King James Bible introduced a new Protestant form of the Bible to church members throughout the country. This translation was in a language and dialect specific to the English people and to their Protestant religion. James I fulfilled the efforts of Protestant reformers who had been supporting the distribution of Bibles in common language for decades. The King James Bible is still used by many people today.

=== Political events ===
The English Civil War (1642–1651) was largely influenced by the Protestant Reformation. While England struggled between Catholicism and Protestantism, Scotland was experiencing a significant impact from the Reformation and its ideas. A strong Presbyterian following had developed, but the Church of Scotland did not agree with King Charles I's expectations of the Protestant religion.

Oliver Cromwell, an English MP born in Huntingdon, emerged victorious at the end of the Civil War. Once he gained control of England, Cromwell established a radical religious government. He organized the Assembly of Saints, a firm and strict sect of Protestantism that was very similar to Puritanism. The Assembly remained strong in England for 10 years until the reign of Charles II, who ended many of the strict practices.

When Parliament passed the Act of Toleration of 1689, dissenters received freedom of worship within England. Catholics were not included in this act of Parliament, but members of other religions, most notably Protestantism, were officially protected from persecution based on their faith.

== Protestantism in other countries of the United Kingdom ==
=== Northern Ireland ===
During the Reformation in Great Britain, the Catholic population of Ireland stayed loyal to the Vatican. The island remained Catholic until the Plantation when large numbers of Scottish Protestants were evicted from their farms and sent to live in the north of the island. The Presbyterian Church in Ireland and the Church of Scotland have been closely tied in the past. In 1871, the Church of Ireland was disestablished and was no longer the state church.

When the island was partitioned in 1921, the north still had a Protestant/British majority and remained part of the United Kingdom.

Northern Ireland has the highest concentration of Catholics of any part of the UK. By the start of the 20th century, Northern Ireland citizens see themselves as approximately half Catholic and half Protestant, although a growing number of people identify as ‘other’, mainly having no religious beliefs or having arrived from a non-Christian country.

=== Scotland ===
Scotland experienced a much deeper movement of Protestant reformation than any other nation in the UK. John Knox is credited with introducing the Reformation to Scotland. Knox sparked the Scottish Reformation in 1560 when he began preaching about Protestantism to large groups of people throughout the country. Later on, Scotland became involved in the English Civil War when Charles I threatened the country's Presbyterian Church. While the king wished to be in charge of all churches and the books and words used within them, other Protestants wanted the freedom to develop their own way of worshipping God, in the way that they believed God wished this to be done.

=== Wales ===
Wales became a part of England when the Tudor dynasty, under Henry VIII, passed the Laws in Wales Acts 1536 and 1542. The religious and political histories of Wales and England were closely tied during the reign of the Tudor monarchs, and the impact of the Reformation in both nations was similar. Specifically, as the Welsh church was a part of the English church, it was separated from Rome in the 1530s when Henry VIII became the ultimate authority in ecclesiastical matters and the Pope's authority was reduced and then eliminated.

In 1588, William Morgan published the Welsh Bible. Welsh is the only non-state language in which the entire Bible was published during the Protestant Reformation.

The Methodist movement that began in the 18th century lead to the pronounced decline of Anglicanism in Wales. During the 19th century, Nonconformist churches (notably the Calvinistic Methodists, Independents and Baptists) grew rapidly in Wales and eventually the majority of Welsh Christians were Nonconformists although the Church of England remained the largest single denomination. This majority resented paying taxes to the Church of England and pressure grew for its disestablishment.

Disestablishment took place in 1920 under the Welsh Church Act 1914 and most of the Church of England parishes in Wales became the Church in Wales, a new member of the Anglican Communion. The Church in Wales is not an established church.

For the most part, faithful Catholics made it more difficult for radical Protestantism to advance in the country. However, Protestants and non-conformists still compose the largest religious group in Wales.

== Protestantism in the United Kingdom today ==
Statistics show a steady decline in church membership and attendance in the United Kingdom. According to the BBC, church attendance in the UK has dwindled in the past 50 years, not just in the Church of England or other Protestant churches, but in all Christian establishments. The BBC reported in 2011 that 26% of people over the age of 65 attend church, as opposed to 11% of those between the ages of 16 and 44.

Britannica Online states that the Church of England has more members than other churches, but there is greater dedication among members of non-conformist congregations. The Office for National Statistics confirmed in its 2001 census that 15% of people in England do not claim any religion. Research in 2005 concluded that the number of citizens who belonged to a religion and attended services at any church had decreased by 41% in 41 years, while those who said they did not belong to any religion and did not attend services increased by 35% in the same amount of time. These numbers point to the increasing secularisation of the country.

According to the 31st British Social Attitudes Survey, the percentage of people identifying as Church of England/Anglican has fallen from 27% in 2003 to 16% in 2013, a drop of 59%. The number of people who say they have no religion has increased by more than 16%, from 43% to 50%, overtaking the proportion of people who claim a religious affiliation. The report also noted that Catholics accounted for 9% of the population and "other Christians" for 16%. The Church of England is still the established church, with the monarch as supreme governor government and the royal family having final say in major appointments, e.g., the position of Archbishop of Canterbury.

Scotland has long been dominated by Presbyterianism. Today, the Church of Scotland is weakening as a state church, and church membership in the country is declining. According to research in the city of Dundee, only 10% of church members attend services regularly.

Although the majority of citizens in Wales are members of Protestant and non-conformist churches, the culture has become increasingly secular. Roman Catholics are a growing minority.

Northern Ireland is now one of the most religiously diverse regions in the UK. Catholicism is still the largest single church in Northern Ireland, but Presbyterians total one-fifth of the population. The Church of Ireland accounts for about one-sixth of the population.

== See also ==
- Conservative evangelicalism in the United Kingdom
- Anti-Catholicism in the United Kingdom
