= Herbert Westfaling =

English bishop and academic administrator

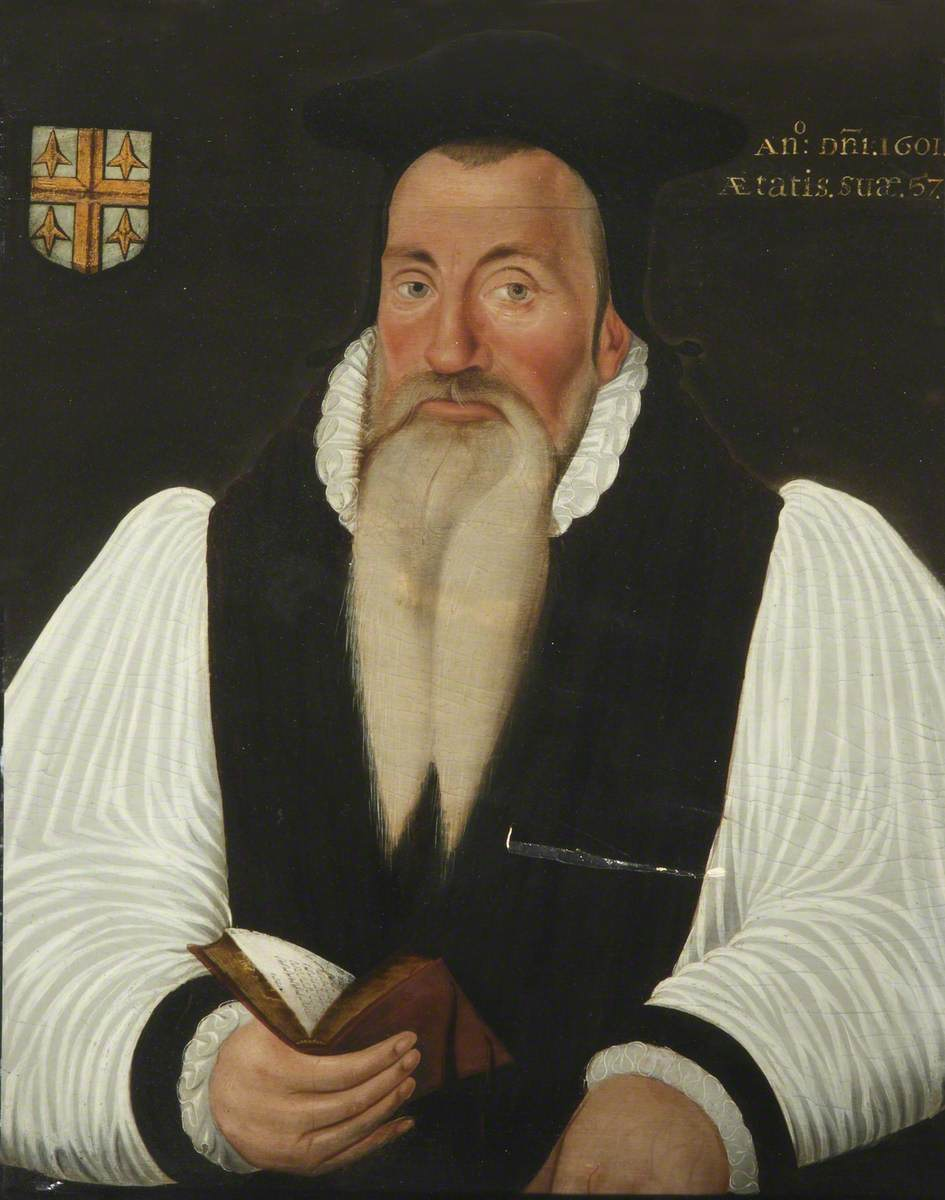
Bishop Westfaling

Herbert Westfaling (also spelled Westphaling, 1531/2 – 1 March 1602), was Anglican Bishop of Hereford and Vice-Chancellor of the University of Oxford.

Westfaling was born in London, England, the son of Harbert Westphaling, whose family originated in Westphalia (Germany). He studied at Christ Church, Oxford from the age of 15, graduating with a BA in 1551 and MA in 1555. He went on to take a BTh in 1561, and DTh in 1566. He was ordained in February 1562 by Bishop of London Edmund Grindal, and subsequently appointed a Canon of Christ Church, Oxford. At the end of 1562, he was appointed Lady Margaret's Professor of Divinity, but remained in the post for only a little over a year. After continuing his career in the church he was appointed Vice-Chancellor of the University of Oxford in June 1576, and as a Canon at St George's Chapel at Windsor Castle the following May.

After his consecration as Bishop of Hereford on 30 January 1586, Westfaling became known for his zeal in confronting Roman Catholics and others whose religious practises he viewed as suspect, criticising Hereford's vicars choral for their use of "superstitious" images and pictures. He was also noted for the gravity and academic tone of his preaching. In 1592 he preached before Queen Elizabeth I in the university church. Despite the Queen twice ordering him to cut his oration short to allow her to deliver a speech, Westfaling refused to be hurried and the Queen's speech was postponed until the next day.

Westfaling was the author of a collection of sermons entitled A Treatise of Reformation in Religion, and also authored a number of poems in English and Latin, now in the library of the University of Cambridge.

Westfaling died in Hereford on 1 March 1602, and an impressive and austere effigy marks the location of his burial in the north transept of Hereford Cathedral. His will included generous provisions for his servants and for the poor of the city of Hereford and his parish at Whitbourne. He also endowed two fellowships and scholarships at Jesus College, Oxford, on the condition that "my kindred shallbe always preferred before anie others".

== Family ==
His daughter Margaret married Richard Edes, the dean of Worcester, and they had two children.

Academic offices
| Preceded by Lawrence Humphrey | Vice-Chancellor of Oxford University; 1576–1577 | Succeeded by William Cole |
Church of England titles
| Preceded by John Scory | Bishop of Hereford; 1585–1602 | Succeeded by Robert Bennet |
