= John Williams (Oxford academic) =

Principal of Jesus College, Oxford

John Williams (died 4 September 1613) was Principal of Jesus College, Oxford, from 1602 to 1613 and also Dean of Bangor.

Born in Llansawel, Carmarthenshire, Williams entered Corpus Christi College, Oxford, in 1569, graduating with a BA in 1573/4 and an MA in 1577, before being elected a Fellow of All Souls College, Oxford, in 1579. After his ordination, he was appointed rector of Llandrinio, Montgomeryshire, in 1594, and also Lady Margaret Professor of Divinity (a position he held until his death). He was elected Fellow of Jesus College in 1590, Principal in 1602, Vice-Chancellor of the University of Oxford in 1604 and Dean of Bangor in 1605.

He died in 1613 and was buried at St Michael's Church, Oxford.
