= New Inn Hall, Oxford =

Former hall of the University of Oxford

New Inn Hall
- University of Oxford
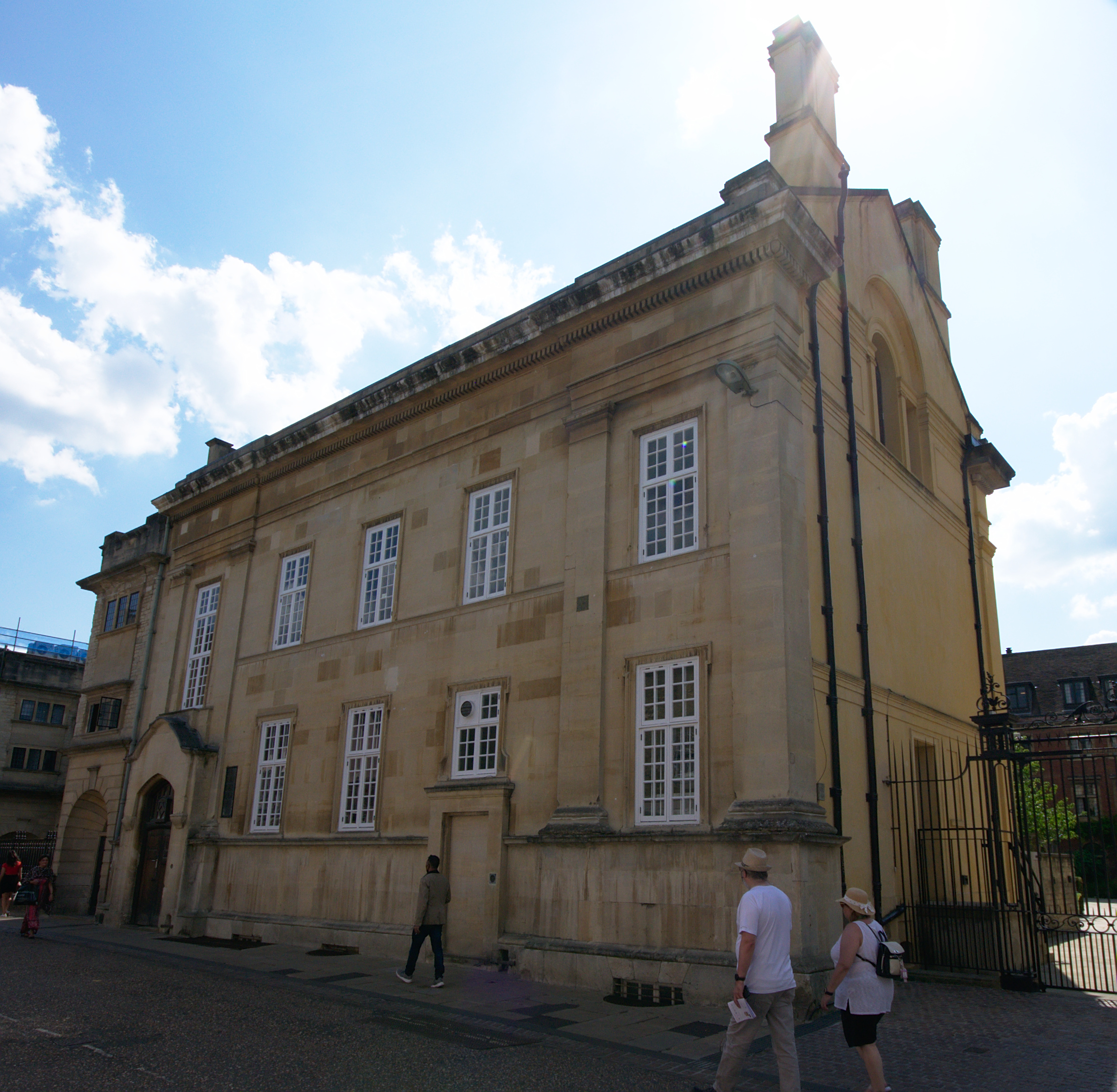
- Hannington Hall in St Peter's College, Oxford, the surviving part of New Inn Hall's Cramer Building.
- Location: New Inn Hall Street
- Coordinates: 51.7522°N 1.2603°W
- Latin name: Aula Novi Hospitii
- Established: c. 1360
- Closed: 1887 (incorporated into Balliol College)
- Principal: see below

Map
- Location within Oxford city centre

New Inn Hall was one of the earliest medieval halls of the University of Oxford. It was located in New Inn Hall Street, Oxford.

== History ==
=== Trilleck's Inn ===
The original building on the site was Trilleck's Inn, a medieval hall or hostel for students, which passed on the death in 1360 of its founder Bishop John Trilleck, Bishop of Hereford to William of Wykeham, Bishop of Winchester, and from him to New College in 1392.

=== New Inn Hall ===
After being used by Cistercian students for some years from about 1400 to 1420, the hall was entirely rebuilt shortly before 1476 and renamed the New Inn.

As the Inns developed into teaching establishments, New Inn Hall became noted for its jurists such as Alberico Gentili, Regius Professor of Civil Law, Sir Daniel Donne, the first MP for Oxford University in Parliament and Dr John Budden, Regius Professor of Civil Law.

During the First English Civil War, the university's college plate was requisitioned by the King's Oxford Parliament and taken to New Inn Hall to be melted down into "Oxford Crowns".

Part of the site was used in 1833 by John Cramer, then the principal, to build the Cramer Building as a hostel for undergraduates.

=== Merger with Balliol College ===
Under a statute of 1881, New Inn Hall was merged into Balliol College in 1887. Balliol acquired New Inn Hall's admissions and other records for 1831–1887 as well as the library of New Inn Hall, which largely contained 18th century law books. New Inn Hall was then used to accommodate students on an Indian Civil Service probationary course.

=== St Peter's College ===
When the site was no longer required by Balliol, it was put up for sale. The Cramer Building was sold in 1894 to Francis James Chavasse and W. Talbot Rice (rector of St Peter-le-Bailey), who converted it into a missionary centre known as Hannington Hall. In 1929, it became part of St Peter's Hall (now St Peter's College), a new college founded by Chavasse, formerly rector of St Peter-le-Bailey and later Bishop of Liverpool.

The remainder of the site was purchased by the City Council, and the buildings demolished to make room for a new Central Girls' School. The school site was subsequently purchased by St Peter's College.

== Principals ==
The following served as Principals of New Inn Hall:

- 1438 William Freman
- 1444 Jeffrey (Griffith) Eberjow
- 1445 William Witney
- 1457 Philip Bergavenny (Abergeyney)
- 1461 Walter Pavy
- 1462 Edward Hanington (Hanyngton)
- 1468 Laurence Cocks
- 1469 Dionysius Hogan
- 1469 Philip Welsh
- 1484 John Lychfeild
- 1490 Richard Carpenter
- 1497 – Powtrell
- 1499 Richard (Robert) Bond
- 1500 Christopher Wardall (Warthiall)
- 1503 John Lacy
- 1504 Richard Salter
- 1510 William Balborow
- 1514 John Worthiall
- 1520 John Payne
- 1528 Roger Carew
- 1529 Thomas Barrett
- 1529 Henry Wright
- 1530 William Roberts
- 1534 Rowland Meyrick
- 1534 William Roberts
- 1542 Richard Richardson
- 1545 David Lewis
- 1548 John Gibbon
- 1550 William Aubrey
- 1550 Hugh Powell
- 1550 Thomas Powell
- 1561 John Griffith
- 1564 Robert Lougher
- 1570 Richard Bray
- 1571 Felix Lewes
- 1575 Robert Lougher
- 1580 Daniel Donne
- 1581 Edmund (Edward) Price
- 1584 John Estmond
- 1585 Francis Bevans
- 1586 Robert Crane
- 1599 John Ferrar
- 1609 John John Budden
- 1618 Charles Twysden
- 1621 Robert Lodington
- 1626 Christopher Rogers (deprived)
- 1643 Christopher Prior
- 1646 Christopher Rogers
- 1662 John Lamphire
- 1663 William Stone
- 1684 Thomas Bayley
- 1709 John Brabourne
- 1726 John Wigan
- 1732 D'Bloissiers Tovey.
- 1745 William Walker
- 1761 William Blackstone
- 1766 Robert Chambers
- 1803 Dr James Blackstone
- 1831–1847 John Anthony Cramer
- 1847–1866 Henry Wellesley
- 1866–1887 Henry Hubert Cornish

== See also ==
- Category:Alumni of New Inn Hall, Oxford
