= W. D. Davies =

Welsh theologian (1911–2001)

W. D. Davies FBA
- Born: William David Davies; 9 December 1911; Glanamman, Wales
- Died: 12 June 2001 (aged 89); Durham, North Carolina, US
- Spouse: Eurwen Llewelyn (m. 1941)
- Children: Rachel M. Davies

Ecclesiastical career
- Religion: Christianity (Congregationalist)
- Ordained: 1941

Academic background
- Education: University College of South Wales and Monmouthshire; Brecon Congregational Memorial College; Fitzwilliam House, Cambridge; Cheshunt College; University of Wales
- Academic advisors: David Daube; C. H. Dodd

Academic work
- Discipline: Theology
- Sub-discipline: Biblical theology
- Institutions: Yorkshire United College; Duke University; Princeton University; Union Theological Seminary
- Doctoral students: E. P. Sanders; Dale Allison
- Influenced: Halvor Moxnes

William David Davies FBA (9 December 1911 – 12 June 2001), often cited as W. D. Davies, was a Welsh Congregationalist minister, theologian, author and professor of religion in England and the United States.

== Life ==
Davies was born in 1911 in Glanamman, Carmarthenshire, Wales. He was educated at Brecon Congregational Memorial College, at the University College of South Wales and Monmouthshire (now Cardiff University), where he graduated BA in 1934 and BD in 1938, and finally at Fitzwilliam House, Cambridge, where he read the theological tripos and graduated with a further BA in 1940. He was ordained to the ministry of the Congregational Church in 1941 and served churches in Cambridgeshire until 1946. Concurrently, he engaged in research at the University of Cambridge under C. H. Dodd, a leading British New Testament scholar, and David Daube, a Jewish scholar who became Regius Professor of Civil Law (Oxford), but who wrote extensively on the New Testament from the vantage point of rabbinic sources.

Davies was then appointed Professor of New Testament Studies at Yorkshire United College in Bradford, Yorkshire, a post he held until 1950. In 1948, the University of Wales granted him the degree of Doctor of Divinity operis causa, the first time for that degree to be so granted. That year saw the publication of his first major book, Paul and Rabbinic Judaism: Some Rabbinic Elements in Pauline Theology, and in 1950 Davies was named Professor of Biblical Theology at Duke Divinity School. In 1955 he became professor of religion at Princeton University, where he was one of three professors (R. B. Y. Scott and Horton Davies the other two) who helped to inaugurate a graduate study program leading to a Doctor of Philosophy degree in religion – the first such program in a secular university in the United States. (See New York Times, July 5, 1955.)

He then became Edward Robinson Professor of Biblical Theology at Union Theological Seminary in the City of New York, where he had important relationships with Reinhold Niebuhr and, across the street, with Louis Finkelstein (Pharisaism), Neil Gillman, Abraham Joshua Heschel (narrative and law), and Saul Lieberman (Hellenism in the land of Israel) – all housed at the Jewish Theological Seminary of America – as well as Salo Wittmayer Baron of Columbia University, up the hill. At Union, he supervised the dissertation of E. P. Sanders, which became the book The Tendencies of the Synoptic Tradition. Davies later returned to Duke as George Washington Ivey Professor of Advanced Studies and Research in Christian Origins.

Davies died on 12 June 2001 in Durham, North Carolina. He and his wife are buried in the graveyard at Hen Fethel (Old Bethel) church of Glanamman.

== Work ==
Davies's period of study and research in Cambridge and his participation in Dodd's seminar led to his editing, together with Daube, of the volume of essays presented to C. H. Dodd in 1956, The Background of the New Testament and Its Eschatology. In his own published works, Davies's double interests – in the Jewish background of the New Testament and in the theological implications of this background – are especially exhibited. His books on Paul's writings and on the Sermon on the Mount (in Matthew) explore Pharisaic understandings of the Law (or Torah) in the "age to come" or messianic era – against the backdrop of developments and thought in Judaism not only during the time of Jesus but also in the closing decades of the first century (especially the destruction of Jerusalem and the Council of Jamnia). ''Paul and Rabbinic Judaism is one of the first books to rescue the apostle from the purely Greek background which earlier scholars had assumed for him. In The Setting of the Sermon on the Mount (1964), Davies sees a law which remains even under the covenant of grace and thus spans the canonical tensions between James and Paul.

Theologically, then, by reorienting views on Paul, and by bringing Pharisaic, nomistic themes in Matthew to the fore, Davies sought to pull together the various New Testament strands and aims at a comprehensive combination of Law and Gospel. As for church life, in Christian Origins and Judaism Davies comes to the conclusion that, in the New Testament (rather like the Old), there is no single fixed pattern of church order that is to be regarded as normative, only certain criteria to guide.

The Dodd-Daube-Davies troika led, in many ways, to the so-called New Perspective on Paul – probably what Davies meant when he eulogized Daube by saying that, when Daube called Christianity "a New Testament Judaism", he ushered in a "near-revolution" in New Testament studies. The leading light of the new/originalist Paul movement, E. P. Sanders, was a student of Daube and Davies, and Sanders's first book, Paul and Palestinian Judaism, is very much in dialogue with Davies's earlier Paul and Rabbinic Judaism. By no means are the two in agreement on all things, but Davies's work in de-Hellenizing Paul allowed for Sanders to approach the apostle dusted, scrubbed, and ready for fresh analysis.

== Selected works ==
=== Books ===
- Davies, W. D. (1948). Paul and Rabbinic Judaism: Some Rabbinic Elements in Pauline Theology. London: SCM Press. OCLC 179912998.
- ——— (1952). Torah in the Messianic Age And/or the Age to Come. Journal of Biblical Literature – Monograph series. Vol. 7. Philadelphia, PA: Society of Biblical Literature. ISBN 9780891301776. OCLC 480736.
- ——— (1962). Christian Origins and Judaism. Philadelphia, PA: Westminster Press. OCLC 759621.
- ——— (1964). The Setting of the Sermon on the Mount. Cambridge: Cambridge University Press. ISBN 9780521047975. OCLC 336409.
- ——— (1966). Invitation to the New Testament: a guide to its main witnesses. Garden City, NY: Doubleday. OCLC 376848.
- ——— (1974). The Gospel and the Land: Early Christianity and Jewish Territorial Doctrine. Pantyfedwen Trust lectures, 1968. Berkeley, CA: University of California Press. ISBN 9780520022782. OCLC 1008990.
- ——— (1982). The Territorial Dimension of Judaism. Quantum book. Berkeley, CA: University of California Press. ISBN 9780520043312. OCLC 7197289.
- ———; Allison, Jr., Dale C. (1988). A Critical and Exegetical Commentary on the Gospel according to Saint Matthew: Vol. 1. Introduction and commentary on Matthew I–VII. International Critical Commentary on the Holy Scriptures of the Old and New Testaments. Edinburgh: T&T Clark. ISBN 9780567094810. OCLC 19460321.
- ———; Allison, Jr., Dale C. (1991). A Critical and Exegetical Commentary on the Gospel according to Saint Matthew: Vol. 2. Commentary on Matthew VIII–XVIII. International Critical Commentary on the Holy Scriptures of the Old and New Testaments. Edinburgh: T&T Clark. ISBN 9780567095459. OCLC 19460321.
- ———; Allison, Jr., Dale C. (1997). A Critical and Exegetical Commentary on the Gospel according to Saint Matthew: Vol. 3. Commentary on Matthew XIX–XXVIII. International Critical Commentary on the Holy Scriptures of the Old and New Testaments. Edinburgh: T&T Clark. ISBN 9780567085184. OCLC 19460321.
- ——— (1999). Christian Engagements with Judaism. Harrisburg, PA: Trinity. ISBN 9781563382680. OCLC 237358305.

=== Edited by ===
- ———; Finkelstein, Louis, eds. (1984). The Cambridge History of Judaism: Vol. 1: Introduction, the Persian Period. Cambridge, UK & New York: Cambridge University Press. ISBN 9781139055116. OCLC 440799715.
- ———; Finkelstein, Louis; Sturdy, John; Horbury, William; Katz, Steven T., eds. (1989). The Cambridge History of Judaism: Vol. 2: The Hellenistic Age. Cambridge, UK & New York: Cambridge University Press. ISBN 9780521219297. OCLC 872998103.
- ———; Sturdy, John; Horbury, William, eds. (1999). The Cambridge History of Judaism: Vol. 3: The Early Roman Period. Cambridge, UK & New York: Cambridge University Press. ISBN 9780521243773. OCLC 1023882413.
