= Wolfgang Ernst =

German lawyer and academic (born 1956)

Wolfgang Hermann Wernher Ernst (born 1956 in Bonn, Germany) is a German lawyer. He was the 28th Regius Professor of Civil Law at the University of Oxford, holding the position from 2015 to 2026. He was succeeded by Professor Wim Decock.

== Life ==
Ernst studied from 1976 to 1980 at the University of Bonn and the Goethe University Frankfurt in Germany. He took his comprehensive examination in 1981 in Bonn and continued his studies 1981–82 at Yale University to achieve a Master of Laws (LL.M.). In 1982, he continued his studies in Germany and was admitted to the bar in 1985. From 1986 to 1990 he was a lecturer at the Institute of Roman Law at the University of Bonn (Institut für Römisches Recht der Universität Bonn) and attained his Habilitation in 1989.

From 1990 to 2000, he lectured at the University of Tübingen as ordentlicher Professor for Roman and private law. In 1994 and 1995, he served as dean of the faculty and later as associate dean. From 2000 to 2004, Ernst taught civil law as director of the Institute of Roman Law in Bonn. In 2002 and 2003, he held the Arthur Goodhart Visiting Professorship in Legal Science as visiting fellow at Magdalene College, Cambridge. As of 2004, Ernst taught Roman and Civil law at the University of Zurich. He held further visiting assignments at the Hebrew University of Jerusalem (2010) and as Herbert Smith Visitor (2012) in Cambridge. In 2015, the Prime Minister announced Ernst as successor of Boudewijn Sirks and the second German legal scholar after David Daube as Regius Professor of Civil Law in Oxford.

Wolfgang Ernst is married with four children.

== Research interests ==
Ernst's research extends over several areas, covering Roman Law, history and theory of default rules in contract law, legal history of social choice, money in the western legal tradition and reciprocity versus altruism in contract law. In 2017, the University of Edinburgh awarded the degree of LL.D. honoris causa onto Ernst.

== Honours ==
In 1995, during his time in Tübingen, Ernst received the Landeslehrpreis Baden-Württemberg. He delivered the Peter Chiene Lecture at the University of Edinburgh in 2003, the memorial lecture in honour of the Austrian lawyer Joseph Unger at the University of Vienna, and in 2014 the MacCormick Lectures in Edinburgh.

== Selected publications ==
Sixty-seven works of Wolfgang Ernst are held in 221 publications and three languages. A selection is:

- Plinius, Epist. 8, 14. In: Meditationes de iure et historia. Essays in Honour of Laurens Winkel (= Fundamina. Special edition). University of South-Africa, Pretoria 2014.
- The Glossators’ Monetary Law. In: John W. Cairns, Paul J. du Plessis (Hrsg.): The Creation of the Ius Commune. Edinburgh University Press, Edinburgh 2010.
- Nisi aliud actum est. In: Tomasz Giaro (Hrsg.): Roman Law and Legal Knowledge. Studies in Memory of Henryk Kupiszewski. University of Warszawa, Warschau 2011.
- Fritz Schulz (1879–1957). In: Jack Beatson, Reinhard Zimmermann (Hrsg.): Jurists Uprooted. German speaking Émigré Lawyers in Twentieth-Century Britain. Oxford University Press, Oxford 2004.
- Die Einrede des nichterfüllten Vertrages: Zur historischen Entwicklung des synallagmatischen Vertragsvollzugs im Zivilprozess. Duncker & Humblot, Berlin 2000.
