= Robert Gentilis =

Roberto Gentili (11 September 1590 – 1655 or later) was a translator into and from multiple languages and the son of sir Alberico Gentili. He started his university education at the age of eight, graduated at the age of twelve and became a Fellow of All Souls College, Oxford at the age of seventeen, below the minimum age, by special dispensation.

== Life ==
Gentilis was born on 11 September 1590 and was named Robert after his godfather, Robert Devereux, 2nd Earl of Essex. His father was the Regius Professor of Civil Law of Oxford, the Father of law, Alberico Gentili. Gentilis grew up speaking many languages: his parents' native languages (Italian from his parents), English, and Latin and Greek taught by his father. He used his linguistic ability to translate Isocrates' Ad demonicum from Greek into Latin, Italian, French and English when he was young. He became a member of Christ Church, Oxford when he was eight years old and he graduated with a Bachelor of Arts degree from Jesus College in 1603 when he was twelve years old. Through a mixture of his ability, his father's tuition and his father's influence, he was then appointed by William Laud to be Collector of the University of Oxford, an important position. In 1607, although he was still only seventeen years old, he was appointed as a Fellow of All Souls when the minimum age was eighteen. His father successfully argued that someone aged seventeen years and a number of days should be treated as being eighteen in the same way that a debt that has been owed for seventeen days and one minute was treated as having been owed for eighteen days.

Although Gentilis obtained his Bachelor of Civil Law degree in 1612, his behaviour had changed before his father's death in 1608. He was described by Anthony Wood as having "turned a rake-hell" and become "king of the beggars for a time", "given up to sordid liberty, if not downright wickedness." He moved abroad for twenty-five years, possibly abandoning a wife in the process (since Alice, "wife of Robert Gentilis", was buried in London in 1619). He married in London in January 1638. He worked as a professional translator and may have received a pension from the king. Nothing is known of him after 1655.

== Works ==
When Gentilis was ten years old, he wrote a dedication in Latin to accompany his father's Lectiones Virgilianae (1603), a commentary upon Virgil's Eclogues that was based upon the lessons that Gentili had given to his son. He wrote further dedications for his father's books, which were addressed to King James I and to three heads of colleges at Oxford. He worked for Humphrey Moseley and Nicholas Fussell as a translator, with his works including History of the Inquisition (1639, from Italian), Antipathy between the French and the Spaniard (1641, from Spanish), Annotations upon the Holy Bible (1643, from Italian), Chief Events in the Monarchy of Spain in the Year 1639 (1647, from Italian), Considerations upon the Lives of Alcibiades and Coriolanus (1650, from Italian, this and the previous being from works of Virgilio Malvezzi), Natural and Experimental History of Winds (1652, from the Latin of Francis Bacon), Discourse for the Attaining of the Sciences (1654, from French) Discourse of Constancy (1654, from Latin), and Coralbo (1655, from Italian). Moseley announced the forthcoming publication of The Anatomy of profane love, translated by Gentilis, in August 1655, but it was never published and nothing further is known of Gentilis after this time; as Gentilis referred to his ill-health in his dedication of Coralbo, it is possible that he died before he completed his next work.
