= Herbert Felix Jolowicz =

British legal scholar (1890–1954)

Herbert Felix Jolowicz (16 July 1890 – 19 December 1954) was a British legal scholar.

== Biography ==
=== Early life ===
Herbert Felix [H.F.] Jolowicz was born on 16 July 1890, the third of three children in the family of the silk merchant Hermann Jolowicz and his wife Marie Litthauer. His sister was the legal scholar Marguerite Wolff.

=== Academic career ===
H.F. was educated first at St Paul's School, London and then at Trinity College, Cambridge, where he had a classical scholarship. Very unusually, Jolowicz not only was one of just two in the first class in part one of the classical tripos in 1911, but two years later he was one of three in the first class of part one of the law tripos. This extraordinary combination "committed him to Roman law and for the time being cut him off from almost all the more practical parts of English law." H.F. spent the rest of 1913 and part of 1914 in Germany studying under the highly regarded Romanists Ludwig Mitteis at Leipzig and Otto Lenel at Freiburg. Jolowicz was fortunate in managing to leave Germany just three days before the start of World War I. He served as an officer in the Bedfordshire regiment in Gallipoli, and also saw service in Egypt, and France during that conflict.

In 1919, after the war, Jolowicz was called to the bar by the Inter Temple as a pupil of Henry (later Lord Justice) Slesser, whose chambers he eventually joined. The next year, however, H.F. returned to academia, becoming a non-resident All Souls reader in Roman law at Oxford. In 1924, he added to that a lectureship, which turned into a readership, in Roman law and jurisprudence at University College, London. He also married Ruby Victoria (1897–1963), a research physicist, in that year. Jolowicz resigned his Oxford position in 1931 when he was appointed professor of Roman law at University College. At University College he also served several administrative functions (including Dean of the Faculty of Law), while maintaining full tutorial and lecture duties.

Directly before the outbreak of World War II, Jolowicz rejoined the armed forces, this time as an intelligence officer whose duties included work related to the Enigma project.

After the war he returned to his position at University College and continued there until appointed Regius Professor of Civil Law at the University of Oxford in 1948. Jolowicz was not a prolific author. Although he wrote numerous articles, Jolowicz only wrote two books: Digest XLVII.2 (De Furtis) (1940) and Historical Introduction to Roman Law (1932). However, one observer noted that, "what he wrote was both thoroughly considered and full of original ideas." (Note: After H.F.’s death a few chapters of a book about later Roman law that he was writing were published as Roman Foundations of Modern Law (1957), and his lectures were edited and published by his son J.A. as Lectures on Roman Law (1963).) Another of Jolowicz's peers, Harold Hanbury, said the publication of Historical Introduction to Roman Law was a "tremendous event" and ranked Jolowicz with Riccobono, de Visscher, and de Zulueta "among the greatest living Romanists".

=== Death ===
Jolowicz died on 19 December 1954 in Oxford at the Acland Nursing Home, after apparently having recovered from a serious illness.

== Published works ==
- "List of Publications: H.F. Jolowicz". Butterworths South African Law Review. 1956: v–vii. 1956.
