= Bernard Jackson =

Bernard Jackson or Bernie Jackson may refer to:

== Sport ==
- Bernard Jackson (American football, born 1980) (born 1980), fullback/linebacker for the Kentucky Horsemen
- Bernard Jackson (defensive back) (1950–1997), American football player
- Bernard Jackson (quarterback) (born 1985), former quarterback for the Colorado Buffaloes
- Bernie Jackson (born 1961), American sprinter

== Other people ==
- Bernard Jackson (professor), former law professor
- Bernard Jackson (singer) (born 1963), American singer with Surface
- C. Bernard Jackson (1927–1996), American playwright
