= John Sturdy =

John Sturdy may refer to:

- John Henry Sturdy, Saskatchewan politician
- John V. M. Sturdy, British academic
