= Sirk =

Sirk may refer to:

- Sirk, Chaharmahal and Bakhtiari, a village in Iran
- Sirk, Isfahan, a village in Kuhpayeh Rural District, Kashan County, Isfahan Province, Iran
- Sirk, Revúca District, a village and municipality in the Banská Bystrica Region of Slovakia
- širk, the Arabic spelling of Shirk (Islam)

== People with the surname ==
- Artur Sirk (1900–1937), Estonian political and military figure
- Douglas Sirk (1897–1987), German film director
- Lea Sirk (born 1989), Slovenian pop singer
- Rauno Sirk (born 1975), Estonian military commander
- Rok Sirk (born 1993), Slovenian footballer
- Thomas Sirk (born 1993), American football player

== See also ==
- Boudewijn Sirks (born 1947), Dutch academic lawyer, professor and papyrologist specializing in Roman law
- Sirk'i (disambiguation)
