= Ilse Bing =

German photographer

- Self portrait in 1931
- Born: 23 March 1899; Frankfurt, Germany
- Died: 10 March 1998 (aged 98); Manhattan, New York, United States
- Occupation: Photographer
- Spouse: Konrad Wolff (m. 1937)

Ilse Bing (23 March 1899 – 10 March 1998) was a German avant-garde and commercial photographer who produced pioneering monochrome images during the inter-war era.

== Biography ==
=== Background and early life ===
Ilse Bing was born into a wealthy Jewish family of merchants in Frankfurt am Main, Germany, on March 23, 1899. Louis Bing and Johanna Elli Bing (née Katz) were her parents. Bing was up in a culturally active family and was exposed to the arts at a young age. Her eventual career in photography was hinted at when she took her first self-portrait with a Kodak box camera, which she obtained when she was fourteen years old.

In 1920, Bing enrolled at the University of Frankfurt, initially pursuing studies in mathematics and physics. However, her academic interests soon shifted to art history and the history of architecture. During the winter semester of 1923–1924, she continued her education at the Kunsthistorisches Institut in Vienna, deepening her knowledge of European art and architecture. In 1924, she began work on a dissertation about the German Neo-Classical architect Friedrich Gilly (1772–1800), and to document architectural subjects for her research, Bing purchased a Voigtländer 9×12 cm camera. This practical use of photography gradually sparked a more artistic interest, and she began creating photographic works as part of her academic process, evolving into a lifelong interest in photography. When she finished her studies in the summer of 1929 and gave up her dissertation, she turned entirely to photography, bought a newly launched Leica (35mm camera) and began working in photojournalism. For the next two decades, the Leica would remain the basis of Bing's artistic work.

=== Paris ===
At the end of 1930 Ilse Bing moved to Paris and continued her photographic work there. She received reportage assignments through the mediation of the Hungarian journalist Heinrich Guttmann. To develop her photos, Guttmann provided her with a garage that Bing used as a darkroom.

Her move from Frankfurt to the burgeoning avant-garde and surrealist scene in Paris marked the start of the most notable period of her career. She produced images in the fields of photojournalism, architectural photography, advertising and fashion, and her work was published in magazines such as Le Monde Illustre, Harper's Bazaar, and Vogue. After initially living in the Hotel Londres on Rue Bonaparte, she moved to Avenue de Maine, 146 in 1931. In the same year, Bing's work was exhibited in both France and Germany. Her rapid success as a photographer and her position as the only professional in Paris to use an advanced Leica camera earned her the title "Queen of the Leica" from the critic and photographer Emmanuel Sougez, whom she met in 1931. In 1933, Bing left Avenue de Maine and moved to Rue de Varenne, No. 8. With the pianist and music teacher Konrad Wolff, who lived in the same house, she was initially only known through his piano playing, which could be heard through the courtyard. A little later they would get to know each other personally and become a couple.

When Bing visited New York in 1936, she received the offer to work as a photographer for Life magazine, which she turned down in order not to be separated from Wolff, who lived in Paris. In the same year, her work was included in the first modern photography exhibition held at the Louvre, and in 1937 she traveled to New York City where her images were included in the landmark exhibition "Photography 1839–1937" at the Museum of Modern Art. Bing and Wolff married in November of the same year and moved to Boulevard Jourdan together in 1938.

Bing remained in Paris for ten years, but in 1940, when Paris was taken by the Germans during World War II, she and her husband who were both Jews, were expelled and interned in separate camps in the South of France. Bing spent six weeks in a camp in Gurs, in the Pyrenees, where she met Hannah Arendt.

In an interview with the German photographer Herlinde Koelbl, Bing later said:

“A lot of people just call it internment camps because we weren't mistreated. I felt it was a concentration camp. To be separated from my husband, not knowing where he is, not knowing what is going on out in the world. (...) This bondage, the absolute lack of freedom and degradation. I always had a razor blade with me. I was determined not to let the Nazis intern me. Then I would have taken my life. But you can take a lot more than you think. It was worse than you could imagine and you could endure more than you thought possible.”

After Wolff stood up for Bing's release at great expense, they managed to reach Marseille together. There they waited nine months for their visa to enter the USA. The Affidavit of Sponsorship required for this was issued by the author and journalist Hendrik Willem van Loon, whom Bing had already met in 1930. In 1941, Bing and Wolff finally emigrated and settled in New York.

=== New York ===
In New York, Bing had to re-establish her reputation, and although she got steady work in advertising and portrait photography, she failed to receive important commissions as in Paris.

When Bing and her husband fled Paris, she was unable to bring her prints and left them with a friend for safekeeping. Following the war, her friend shipped Bing's prints to her in New York, but Bing could not afford the custom fees to claim them all. Some of her original prints were lost when Bing had to choose which prints to keep.

In the 1940s and 50s, Bing was best known for her portraits of children, but also photographed personalities such as Dwight D. Eisenhower and his wife Mamie.

By 1947, Bing came to the realization that New York had revitalized her art. Her style was very different; the softness that characterized her work in the 1930s gave way to hard forms and clear lines, with a sense of harshness and isolation. This was indicative of how Bing’s life and worldview had been changed by her move to New York and the war-related events of the 1940s.

Bing struggled with her identity professionally after moving to New York. Compared to 1936, Bing's response was much colder. She was one of many refugee artists who struggled to make a successful career for herself in this new culture, particularly while it was limited by the hardships of war.

Also in 1947, she went on a trip to Germany and France for the first time after the end of the war, visiting a.o. the war-torn Frankfurt and stayed in Paris for three months. From 1950 Bing worked with a Rolleiflex, which she used in alternation with the Leica for the next two years, but in 1952 decided to work exclusively with the medium format of the Rolleiflex.

In 1951 and 1952 she visited Paris again and always had her camera with her. In 1957 she turned away from black-and-white photography and concentrated on working with color negatives. In 1959, Bing decided to give up photography altogether. She felt the medium was no longer adequate for her, and seemed to have tired of it. As a result, texts, collages, and drawings were created. She later said:

“I couldn't say anything new with this medium. I stopped working with the camera at the height of my photographic developments. I couldn't use it to express what I was experiencing. Of course, I could have taken nice pictures, but it no longer came from within. The character of the work changed with my development and has now been given a new face."

In the mid-1970s, the Museum of Modern Art purchased and showed several of her photographs. This show sparked renewed interest in Bing's work, and subsequent exhibitions included a solo show at the Witkins Gallery in 1976, and a traveling retrospective entitled, ''Ilse Bing: Three Decades of Photography,'' organized by the New Orleans Museum of Art. Numerous solo exhibitions followed in New York, Las Vegas, Chicago, San Francisco, Frankfurt, and many more. Bing's photographs were also featured in multitudinous group exhibitions.

Bing published her first book in 1976 under the title Words as Visions at Ilkon. Press. Another publication with the title Numbers in Images followed in 1978 by the same publisher. In 1982 Bing published the illustrated book Women from Cradle to Old Age – 1929-1955, which contains numerous monochrome as well as color photographic portraits of women. The foreword was written by Gisèle Freund.

The emerging attention that Bing has enjoyed from the 1970s through the 1980s can be traced back to the growing fascination and interest in European photography of the 1920s and 1930s.

From 1984 onwards, Ilse Bing made a number of appearances in the USA and Germany as a speaker on the development of modern art, especially photography. In the course of this activity she held i.a. Lectures in Frankfurt, Essen, Cologne, New Orleans and New York.

In the last few decades of her life, she wrote poetry, made drawings and collages, and occasionally incorporated bits of photos. She was interested in combining mathematics, words, and images.

Bing died on March 10, 1998, shortly before her ninety-ninth birthday, in New York.

== Versatility with Street Photography ==
=== Angles ===
Low and High Angles: Bing frequently used extremely low or high viewpoints to add drama and abstraction to her images. She would, for instance, take pictures of bridges, towers, and staircases from below to highlight their geometry and height.

Tilted Horizons: In contrast to the conventional, flat framing, she welcomed diagonal lines and tilted perspectives, commonly referred to as "Dutch angles". Her photos have a vibrant, modernist character as a result.

Geometric Composition: She transformed everyday scenes into captivating visual studies by emphasizing shapes, shadows, and light with acute angles. She frequently aligned her compositions with building lines or reflections.

Close-ups & Cropping: Bing didn't hesitate to use close-ups from unusual perspectives or to crop her subjects in unexpected ways. Depending on the topic, this produced an atmosphere of abstraction or closeness.

Motion and Time: Her interest in the movement of time and energy inside a still photograph is demonstrated by the times she employed tilted views to capture movement, such as dancers, shadows, or street scenes.

=== Motion ===
Ilse Bing used both technological ingenuity and creative insight to capture motion in her street photography. Her art was impromptu and unstaged since she could move freely and respond fast to ephemeral moments using the lightweight 35mm Leica camera. She frequently used blur instead of freezing motion to portray energy and urban vibrancy by catching moving persons against motionless backgrounds. Additionally, Bing transformed ordinary light play into poetic representations of time and change by using shadows and reflections as oblique means of conveying movement.

Unposed scenes of people playing, working, or strolling were common in her honest compositions; these situations were usually skewed or off-center to add motion. Her keen sense of time allowed her to catch the exact moment a person entered or left the frame, lending her photographs a narrative element that mirrored the cadence of everyday life. Her 1932 image "Rue de Valois, Paris," which captures a guy in the middle of a finely staged moment of city life, is a noteworthy illustration of this strategy.

=== Printing Techniques ===
Ilse Bing was an expert in darkroom methods and considered printing to be a vital component of her creative process. She achieved a fine balance between emotion and clarity by carefully adjusting exposure, contrast, and tonal range. Bing, who is well-known for her rich contrast and gentle grayscale, produced prints with deep blacks and seamless tonal shifts that accentuated the modernist elements of her artwork. She also experimented with solarization, which adds mood or abstraction to some photos by partially reversing tones to produce surreal, halo-like effects.

Bing was flexible even though she carefully planned her shots in-camera; she frequently edited her final images before printing to improve balance and rhythm. In order to promote intimate, direct interaction with her images, she usually printed in small formats. Her prints were as unique and expressive as her compositions thanks to her technical proficiency and imaginative darkroom techniques.

== Artistic practice and subjects ==
=== Artistic practice ===
Ilse Bing always took photos from a very individual point of view, both for portraits and for countless architectural photos. What they work best characterizes enlargement of fragments of 35mm film her Leica and the resulting idiosyncratic cropping. Although Bing experimented a lot, her photographs often seem characterized by a natural perfection. While the photographer's access to her craft was often spontaneous and intuitive, it was also characterized by great care and precision. Her work was shaped by contemporary abstract and non-representational painting as well as by New Vision and Surrealism. Since working in the darkroom had a significant impact on the results and appearance of Bing's photography, she always developed her negatives herself. She also discovered a type of solarisation for negatives independently of a similar process developed by the artist Man Ray.

=== Subjects ===
In addition to numerous portraits, Ilse Bing was primarily interested in urban motifs. They were fascinated by architectural elements and structures as well as urban hustle and bustle. Her way of working repeatedly explores the tracing of symmetry and rhythm in the experience of everyday situations. Bing always worked without additional lighting and operated exclusively with the existing lighting conditions. She used both artificial light sources such as illuminated windows, lanterns, street lamps, spotlights or the Eiffel Tower, as well as natural light from the sun and moon. Reflections can often be found in her work, e.g. in rain puddles, rivers and seas. Bing developed a feeling for movement and standstill, which she expressed in the photographs of water as well as of people and objects.

== Words as Visions and Numbers in Images ==
=== Words as Visions: Logograms (1974) ===
In the book dedicated to Konrad Wolff, Ilse Bing presents 111 associated words, which are listed in three languages (German, English and French) and illustrated by her own drawings:

“to be, to have, words, yes, no, why, because, good, bad, crime, pain, envy, mine, i, you, they, identity, reality, illusion, hope, expectation, inspiration, awe, hate, love, ideal, sleep, death, mourning, (to) remember, forgotten, lost, missing, alone, lonely, bored, alive, happy, (to) smile, when, time, timeless, now, yesterday, tomorrow, ever, never, final, endless, no more, eternity, where, here, nowhere, probable, perhaps, sure, obvious, enough, absolute, old, new, discovery, invention, noise, silence, sound, ugly, beautiful, warm, hot, cold, slow, fast, ready, alert, very, and, by, if, so, but, please, thanks, (to) begin, (to) wait, good-bye, something, everything, nothing, this, demonic, true, lie, error, mistake, doubt, trusting, success, bravo, must, chance, hazard, happening, epilogue“

Bing explains the choice of words in the book's epilogue:

“– i picked the words like flowers in a field. the ones which signalled me the strongest were taken first. there is no apparent systems in the choice or order of words, and yet they may stand for, and unveil, the hidden body of my thoughts –”

=== Numbers in Images: Illuminations of Numerical Meanings (1976) ===
In this work, published in 1976, Ilse Bing dedicates herself to numbers and thus returns to a certain extent to the origins of her academic training when she was still studying mathematics and physics. As in the previously published Words as Visions, the book is fully illustrated with Bing's drawings.

She introduces her thoughts and poems about numbers as follows:

„this limited selection does not touch on all facets of numbers, because its function is to illuminate, and not to explain. it deals with the very lowest numbers, those which we still can count on our fingers. for these are the base of the entire numerical row, and also the fundament for all mathematical constructions.“

== Use of the Leica Camera ==
In the early 1930s, Ilse Bing was one of the first professional photographers to use the Leica 35mm camera, a ground-breaking piece of gear. Because of its small size, portability, and quick shutter, the Leica was perfect for shooting unscripted moments and dynamic compositions, which Bing used to great artistic advantage. In 1929, she bought her first Leica, which soon became a staple of her work. Bing used the Leica to experiment with radical framing, high and low angles, natural light, and deep shadows—characteristics that aligned her with the modernist movement in photography. Her Leica work captured the energy of urban life, particularly in Paris, where she documented architectural geometry, fleeting street scenes, and atmospheric interiors. Critics and peers alike took note of her innovative eye, and she was soon dubbed “The Queen of the Leica,” a nickname that reflected both her technical command and her creative vision. Her Leica breakthrough helped 35mm photography gain more widespread acceptance as a legitimate artistic medium. The expressive and journalistic possibilities of the more adaptable Leica was showcased by Bing's work during a period when many fine art photographers still preferred large-format cameras. Her photographs were displayed beside those of Man Ray, Brassaï, and Henri Cartier-Bresson and were included in magazines such as Vu, Harper's Bazaar, and Lilliput.

== Awards ==
- 1990: Women’s Caucus for Art Award, New York.
- 1993: First Gold Medal Award for Photography vom National Arts Club, New York.

== Exhibitions ==
- 1948: „Ilse Bing Photographs”, The Brookly Museum
- 1985: „Ilse Bing: Three Decades of Photography“, New Orleans Museum of Art
- 1986: „Ilse Bing“, International Center of Photography, New York
- 1995: „Ilse Bing – Marta Hoepffner – Abisag Tüllmann. Drei Fotografinnen in Frankfurt“, Historical Museum, Frankfurt
- 1996: „Ilse Bing – Fotografien 1929–1956“, Suermondt-Ludwig-Museum, Aachen
- 2004: „Ilse Bing: Queen of the Leica“, Victoria & Albert Museum, London
- 2019: “Ilse Bing (1899-1998): Fotografien”, Galerie Berinson, Berlin
- 2020: “Ilse Bing: Paris and Beyond”, F11 Foto Museum, Hong Kong
- 2020: “Ilse Bing: Queen of the Leica”, The Cleveland Museum of Art
- 2021: in "The New Woman Behind the Camera", The Metropolitan Museum of Art, New York

== Documentary ==
Bing was one of three female photographers portrayed in Drei Fotografinnen: Ilse Bing, Grete Stern, Ellen Auerbach, a 1993 documentary by Berlin filmmaker Antonia Lerch.

== Public collections ==
- Art Institute of Chicago
- New Orleans Museum of Art
- Glyndebourne
- Jewish Museum, Berlin
- Jewish Museum (Manhattan)
- Los Angeles County Museum of Art
- MOCA Grand Avenue
- Museum Folkwang
- Museum of Modern Art (MoMA)
- National Gallery of Canada
- Rijksmuseum Amsterdam
- San Francisco Museum of Modern Art
- Victoria & Albert Museum
