= Boudewijn Sirks =

Dutch academic lawyer and legal historian (born 1947)

A. J. B. Sirks
- Born: Adriaan Johan Boudewijn Sirks; 14 September 1947 (age 79)
- Title: Regius Professor of Civil Law

Academic background
- Education: Leiden University (LLM); University of Amsterdam (MA, PhD)
- Thesis: Qui annonae urbis serviunt : de juridische regelingen in het romeinse keizerrĳk inzake het vervoer van onus fiscale, met name voor de annona, over zee en over de Tiber (1984)
- Doctoral advisor: Hans Ankum

Academic work
- Institutions: Utrecht University; University of Amsterdam; Johann Wolfgang Goethe University Frankfurt am Main; All Souls College, Oxford

Sirks leads here. For places and people named Sirk, see Sirk (disambiguation)

Adriaan Johan Boudewijn Sirks (born 14 September 1947), known as Boudewijn Sirks and as A. J. B. Sirks, is a Dutch academic lawyer and legal historian specializing in Roman law. He was Regius Professor of Civil Law at the University of Oxford from 2006 to 2014.

== Early life ==
Sirks was born in The Hague, Netherlands. He studied law at the Leiden University, graduating with a Master of Laws (LLM) degree in 1972. He then studied theology and philosophy at the University of Amsterdam, where he later graduated with as Doctor of Law in 1984. In 2014 he was appointed Knight in the Order of the Netherlands Lion (RNL) and in 2021 he became Doctor of Civil Law (Oxon.).

== Career ==
Sirks's first academic position was as research assistant in philosophy of culture and esthetics at Amsterdam in 1975. In 1978 he was appointed Lecturer in Legal History at the University of Utrecht, where he was later promoted Senior Lecturer in Legal Techniques. At the same time, he was writing a thesis for a doctoral degree in law at the University of Amsterdam. He returned to Amsterdam in 1989 as Reader and acting Professor of Legal Techniques.

In 1997, Sirks became Professor of Legal History and (German) Civil Law (the chair of the late Helmut Coing), later renamed into History of Ancient Law, History of European Private Law, and (German) Civil Law, at the Johann-Wolfgang-Goethe University of Frankfurt am Main. In 2002 he was elected correspondent of the Royal Netherlands Academy of Arts and Sciences.

In December 2005, Sirks was appointed as the Regius Professor of Civil Law in the University of Oxford, with effect from 1 February 2006, in succession to the late Peter Birks. At the same time he was elected a Fellow of All Souls College, Oxford. He retired from the chair in 2014, but is still Fellow of All Souls College.

Sirks has also been a visiting scholar at Columbia University, Visiting Professor at the University of Kansas, and Visiting Professor at the Pontifica Universidad Católica de Santiago de Chile. In 2018/2019 and in 2022 he taught at the University of Bonn. He is an Editor of the Tijdschrift voor Rechtsgeschiedenis/Legal History Review. He is further a Member of the Direttivo of the Associazione Storico-Giuridico Costantiniana.

== Published work ==
Professor Sirks's research interests span civil law, European private law, Roman law and papyrology. He has published work on a variety of subjects related to law, papyrology, and the ancient world, including archaic Roman law, matters of classical private law, the administrative and public law of the later Roman Empire and the reception of Roman law in Europe and in the former Dutch East Indies. He is co-author of the standard edition of the Pommersfelden Papyri. The Theodosian Code and the colonate in the Roman empire are particularly subjects of research.

His Food for Rome: the Legal Structure of the Transportation and Processing of Supplies for the Imperial Distributions in Rome and Constantinople (1991) developed from the thesis for his doctoral degree at Amsterdam, completed in 1984. Following the death of the Dutch papyrologist Pieter Johannes Sijpesteijn in 1996, Sirks edited with K. A. Worp a collection of previously unpublished papyri dedicated to Sijpesteijn's memory by his fellow papyrologists, including papyri from the Hellenistic, Roman and Byzantine periods, to reflect Sijpesteijn's wide interests.

=== Selected publications ===
- H. M. A. Jansen, Johannes B. Opschoor, Adriaan Johan Boudewijn Sirks, Verkeerslawaai in Nederland (Coutinho, January 1977) ISBN 978-90-6283-504-1 (Note: Title in English: Traffic noise in the Netherlands)
- A. J. B. Sirks, Sulpicius Severus' Letter to Salvius in Bolletino dell'Istituto di Diritto romano 85 (1982) pp. 143–170 (Note: Summarized by R. D. Tanner: "...regarding Letter VI, A. J. B. Sirks has made a firm defence of authenticity based on the juridical details which fit the era of Severus" (Tanner, R. D., The Spurious Letters of Sulpicius Severus in Studia Patristica Vol XXVIII, Leuven, Peeters, 1993, p. 114))
- A. J. B. Sirks, Food for Rome: the Legal Structure of the Transportation and Processing of Supplies for the Imperial Distributions in Rome and Constantinople (Amsterdam, Gieben, 1991) ISBN 978-90-5063-069-6 (Note: With origins in an Amsterdam doctoral thesis of 1984, Food for Rome examines the transportation and processing of supplies for free imperial distribution in Rome and Constantinople and the regulations governing their distribution.)
- A. J. B. Sirks, Summaria antiqua Codicis Theodosiani, new edition, with the notes published in P. Krüger, Codicis Theodosiani fragmenta Taurinensia (A. J. B. Sirks, Amsterdam, 1996, XII + 130 pp)
- Boudewijn Sirks, The editing and compilation of the Code in I. Wood, Jill Harries, The Theodosian Code: Studies in the Imperial Law of Late Antiquity (1996)
- A. J. Boudewijn Sirks, Shifting Frontiers in the Law: Romans, Provincials, and Barbarians, in Ralph Mathisen and Hagith Sivan, eds., Shifting Frontiers in Late Antiquity (Aldershot, 1996)
- A. J. B. Sirks, P. J. Sijpesteijn, K. A. Worp (eds), Ein frühbyzantinisches Szenario für die Amtswechslung in der Sitonie: die griechischen Papyri aus Pommersfelden (PPG) mit einem Anhang über die Pommersfeldener Digestenfragmente und die Überlieferungsgeschichte der Digesten (Munich, Beck, 1996)
- A. J. B. Sirks, The Epistula ad Salvium, appended to a letter of Sulpicius Severus to Paulinus: Observations on a recent analysis by C. Lepelley, in Subseciva Groningana Vol. VI (1999) 75
- A. J. B. Sirks, Saving Souls through Adoption: Legal Adaptation in the Dutch East Indies in John W. Cairns, O. F. Robinson, Critical Studies in Ancient Law, Comparative Law and Legal History (Hart Publishing, 2001) pp 365–379, ISBN 1-84113-157-1
- A. J. B. Sirks, Sailing in the Off-Season with Reduced Financial Risk and Some Reflections in J.-J. Aubert, A. J. B. Sirks (eds), Speculum Iuris, Roman Law as a Reflection of Social and Economic Life in Antiquity (The University of Michigan Press, Ann Arbor, 2002)
- A. J. B. Sirks, Die Nomination für die städtischen Ämter im römischen Reich, in A. Cordes, J. Rückert, R. Schulze (eds), Stadt - Gemeinde - Genossenschaft: Festschrift für Gerhard Dilcher zum 70. Geburtstag (Erich Schmidt Verlag, 2003) ISBN 3-503-06163-0 (Note: Abstract: Public officials in Roman towns were originally elected, but from the second century on a candidate was nominated and could appeal to the governor before being appointed. Opinions differ on the detail and meaning of this. It has been suggested that the change may have been due to the economic situation and to a lack of enthusiasm for town administration. Sirks submits that either a committee or the outgoing official proposed the candidates, their nomination was a decision to accept such proposals, the candidate's appeal could be made before the nomination became an appointment, and that the motivation for the change was that town councillors wanted to restrict appointment to their own descendants.)
- A.J.B. Sirks and K. A. Worp (eds), Papyri in Memory of P J Sijpesteijn (Oakville CT, American Studies in Papyrology 40, American Society for Papyrologists, 2004) ISBN 0-9700591-0-8
- A. J. B. Sirks, Der Zweck des Senatus Consultum Claudianum von 52 n. Chr. (2005) in 122 Zeitschrift der Savigny-Stiftung fur Rechtsgeschichte, Romanistische Abteilung, pp. 138–149, ISSN 0323-4096 (Note: Abstract: The Senatus Consultum Claudianum of 52 AD sanctions the cohabitation of a free woman with a slave, with the enslavement of the woman and of any children born of the union to the slave's owner, if the woman does not leave the slave after a formal warning to do so by his owner. This is interpreted as punishment of the woman, curbing of unequal unions, protection of property, and increase of slaves. These explanations show great flaws, and an analysis of Pauli Sententiae 2, 21a, 6-11, which deal with the application of the Senatus Consultum, shows that the true purpose of the Senatus Consultum was to protect the authority of the slave's owner over him, but only if the owner wished this.)
- A. J. B. Sirks, Het “Rapport van L. Taillefert en W.A. Alting betreffende het Alphabetisch Receuil van J.J. Craan” (der statutaire wetten en reglementen &.a van Nederlandsch Oost-Indië) van 29 augustus 1765, met bijlagen en met het Alphabetisch Receuil op CD-Rom, uitgegeven door A.J.B. Sirks, [Werken der Stichting tot Uitgaaf der Bronnen van het Oud-Vaderlandse Recht no. 31], ’s-Gravenhage 2005.
- A. J. B. Sirks, Van Bijnkershoeks Observationes (2018-2913), in het Nederlands samengevat door B.M. Telders, K.N. Korteweg, W.L. van Spengler, F.J. de Jong, G.J. ter Kuile en W. van Iterson, met aanvulling van de ontbrekende samenvattingen door A.J.B. Sirks, uitgegeven door A.J.B. Sirks, [Werken der Stichting tot Uitgaaf der Bronnen van het Oud-Vaderlandse Recht no. 30], ’s-Gravenhage 2005, [ISBN 90-803252-4-4]
- A. J. B. Sirks, C. van Bijnkershoek, W. Pauw, Index in observationes tumultuarias, uitgegeven door A.J.B. Sirks, [Werken der Stichting tot Uitgaaf der Bronnen van het Oud-Vaderlandse Recht no. 34], ’s-Gravenhage 2005, ISBN 90-803252-3-6
- Boudewijn Sirks, The food distributions in Rome and Constantinople: Imperial power and continuity in Kolb, Anne, Herrschaftsstrukturen und Herrschaftspraxis: Konzepte, Prinzipien und Strategien der Administration im römischen Kaiserreich (Akademie Verlag, 2006) ISBN 3-05-004149-8
- A. J. B. Sirks, The Theodosian Code, a Study (Editions du Quatorze Septembre, 2007) ISBN 978-3-00-022777-6
- Grundzüge der europäischen Privatrechtsgeschichte. Einführung und Sachenrecht, door W.J. Zwalve, A.J.B. Sirks, Wien/Köln 2012 p.
- A. J. B. Sirks, Common right and reason’ against Parliament and King, in Divus Thomas 123 (2020) 167–183.
- A. J. B. Sirks, the published Theodosian Code include obsolete constitutions?, Tijdschrift voor Rechtsgeschiedenis 89 (2021), 70–92.
- A. J. B. Sirks, after the division of administration in 364 an emperor issue a law for the entire empire?, in: ZSS Rom Abt 138 (2021), 555–567.
- A. J. B. Sirks, The imperial policy against heretics of restricting succession in the fourth century AD, with an appendix on the Theodosian Code, Tijdschrift voor REchtsgeschiedenis 89 (2021), 536–577.
- A. J. B. Sirks, The colonate in the Later Roman empire, Tijdschrift boor REchtsgeschiedenis 90 (2022), 129–147.
- A. J. B. Sirks, Farming as a Financial Enterprise in the Late Roman Republic and the Question of the Partes, in ‘Law and Economic Performance in the Roman World’, ed. K. Verboven, P. Erdkamp, Leiden 2022, 117–130.
