= Thomas Bouchier =

English lawyer and academic (1633–1723)

Thomas Bouchier (Note: Also "Bourchier", "Boucher" or "Butcher") (1633–1723) was an English lawyer and academic. He held the Regius Chair in Civil Law at the University of Oxford for forty years.

== Biography ==
=== Education and Career ===
Bouchier was born in 1633 to James Bouchier, a landowner from Hanborough in Oxfordshire. He matriculated at the University of Oxford's Magdalen Hall in November 1650, later becoming a fellow of All Souls College. Bouchier took the degree of Bachelor of Civil Law in July 1658, and became a Doctor of Civil Law in June 1663. The year that he took his doctorate, Bouchier was admitted as an advocate to the Court of Arches, and in 1664 he became a member of Doctors' Commons, though he never practiced.

The Regius Professor of Civil Law of the day was Sir Giles Sweit, who was also Dean of the Arches. When judicial duties drew Sweit to London, Bouchier would deputise for him in Oxford. When Sweit died in 1672, Bouchier became Regius Professor in his own right.

In 1678, Bouchier left All Souls to become principal of St Alban Hall, a post he would hold until his death in 1723.

=== Family ===
Bouchier's wife was named Frances Astell. The couple had three sons: James, Richard, and William.

James Bouchier (1683–1736) followed in his father's footsteps and studied the civil law. In 1712, James succeeded as Regius Professor by his father's arrangement. Thomas Hearne gave some explanation in his diary, saying "that the late Queen was strangely impos'd upon by a pack of Villains, when she made him Professor". Upon his father's death, he also succeeded as principal of St Alban Hall.

Richard Bouchier (1691–1725) matriculated at St Alban Hall in 1707 before being awarded a demyship at Magdalen College (Note: Not to be confused with his father's original Magdalen Hall.) later that year. He graduated Bachelor of Arts in 1711, Master of Arts in January 1714, and Bachelor of Divinity in January 1725. He was a fellow of Magdalen College from 1719 until his death on 20 April 1725.

William Bouchier was born in 1694 and matriculated at New College in September 1712. He graduated Bachelor of Arts in 1716, Master of Arts in January 1720, Bachelor of Medicine in 1722, and Doctor of Medicine in 1727.

=== Death ===
Thomas Bouchier died in Hanborough on 9 May 1723.

=== Reputation ===
Upon his death, Thomas Hearne wrote that Bouchier had "good Skill", but that he was a "vile, abominable Wretch" who put money before all else. Hearne also noted that St Alban Hall had been ruined under the principalship of Bouchier, with the hall being closed and unoccupied while Bouchier lived on his estates in Hanborough.
