= Bernard Jackson (professor) =

Bernard Stuart Jackson is a former law professor at Liverpool Polytechnic, the University of Kent (1985), and the University of Liverpool (Queen Victoria Professor of Law, 1989–97). From 1997-2009 he was Alliance Professor of Modern Jewish Studies at the University of Manchester, Co-Director of its Centre for Jewish Studies and Director of its Agunah Research Unit (2004–09). Latterly, he was (PT) Professor of Law and Jewish Studies at Liverpool Hope University (2009–15). His major academic interests are legal theory, semiotics, and Jewish law.

Jackson was the founding editor of The Jewish Law Annual, 1978–97; and (with others) has published An Introduction to the History and Sources of Jewish Law (Oxford: Clarendon Press, 1996). Jackson works with colleagues in the Mishpat Ivri movement yet he criticizes the dominant approach based on legal positivism and has been both Hon. President and Chairman of The Jewish Law Association. He was a founder member of the International Association for the Semiotics of Law, and initiator of its journal.

Jackson studied early Jewish law under David Daube, Regius Professor of Civil Law (Oxford).

== Selected works ==
Single author books:

- Theft in Early Jewish Law, Oxford, The Clarendon Press, 1972
- Essays in Jewish and Comparative Legal History, Leiden, E. J Brill, 1975
- Semiotics and Legal Theory, London, Routledge & Kegan Paul, 1985; paperback ed. 1987, reprinted Deborah Charles Publications 1997
- Law, Fact and Narrative Coherence, Merseyside, Deborah Charles Publications, 1988; paperback ed. 1990
- Making Sense in Law. Linguistic, Psychological and Semiotic Perspectives, Liverpool, Deborah Charles Publications, 1995, pp.xii + 512
- Making Sense in Jurisprudence, Liverpool, Deborah Charles Publications, 1996, pp. 362
- Studies in the Semiotics of Biblical Law, Sheffield, Sheffield Academic Press, 2000, pp. 332 (JSOT Supplement Series, 314)
- "Wisdom-Laws: A Study of the Mishpatim of Exodus 21:1-22:16", Oxford. Oxford University Press, 2006, pp. 552
- "Essays on Halakhah in the New Testament", Leiden: E.J. Brill, 2007, pp. 264 (Jewish and Christian Perspectives Series, 16)
- Agunah, The Manchester Analysis, Liverpool: Deborah Charles Publications, 2011, pp. 299

Full bibliography (over 200 items) at http://www.legaltheory.demon.co.uk/lib_biblioBSJ1.html, updated annually
