= Frank Frost Abbott =

American classical philologist

Frank Frost Abbott (March 27, 1860 – July 23, 1924) was an American classical scholar.

== Life ==
Born in Redding, Connecticut, he taught at the University of Chicago, then moved to Princeton University in 1907. He died in Montreux, Switzerland.

== Works ==
- Selected Letters of Cicero (1897).
- A History and Description of Roman Political Institutions (1901).
- A Short History of Rome (1906)
- Society and Politics in Ancient Rome (1909).
- The Common People of Ancient Rome (1911).
- Roman Politics (1923).
- Municipal Administration in the Roman Empire (1926).

He also translated Alberico Gentili's Hispanicae Advocationis Libri Dvo ("Two Books of Advocacy in the Service of Spain").
