= David Daube =

German-born British and American scholar (1909–1999)

David Daube FBA
- Portrait by Walter Stoneman, 1957
- Born: 8 February 1909; Freiburg im Bresgau, Germany
- Died: 24 February 1999 (aged 90); Pleasant Hill, California, US
- Title: Professor-in-Residence at UC Berkeley School of Law
- Spouses: Herta Babette (Affseesser) (m. 1936; div. 1964); Helen Smelser (Margolis) (m. 1986)
- Children: 3

Academic background
- Education: Berthold-Gymnasium, Freiburg; University of Freiburg; University of Göttingen; University of Cambridge
- Influences: Otto Lenel

Academic work
- Discipline: Ancient and Biblical Law
- Institutions: University of Aberdeen; University of Oxford; University of California, Berkeley
- Influenced: E. P. Sanders

David Daube FBA (8 February 1909, in Freiburg, Germany – 24 February 1999, in Berkeley, California) was the twentieth century's preeminent scholar of ancient law. He combined a familiarity with many legal systems, particularly Roman law and biblical law, with an expertise in Greek, Roman, Jewish, and Christian literature, and used literary, religious, and legal texts to illuminate each other and, among other things, to "transform the position of Roman law" and to launch a "revolution" or "near revolution" in New Testament studies.

== Early life and education ==
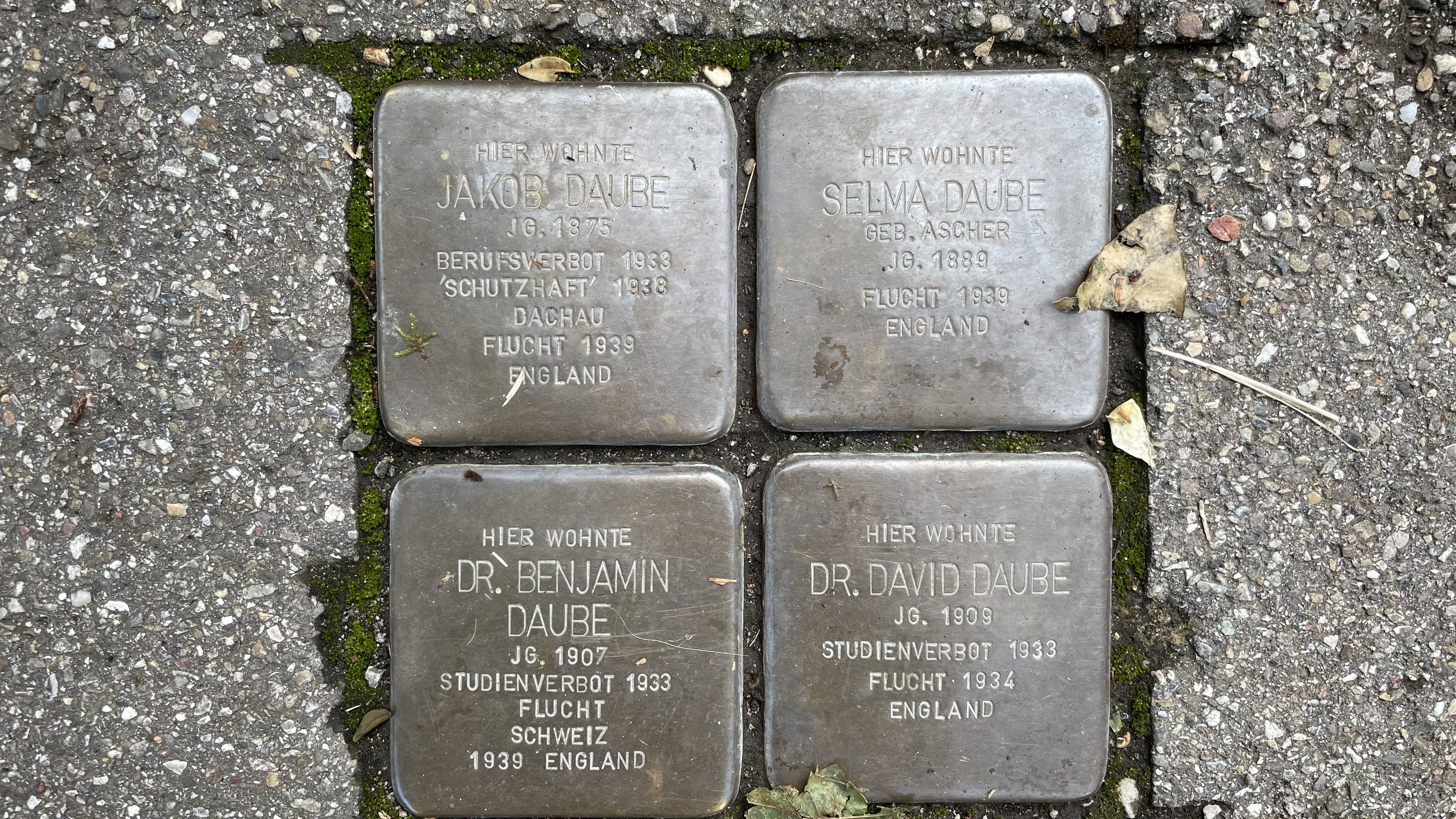
'Stolpersteine' in front of Goethestraße 35, 79100 Freiburg im Breisgau, for Jakob Daube, Selma Daube née Ascher, Dr. Benjamin Daube and Dr. David Daube

David Daube was born on 8 February 1909 in Freiburg im Bresgau, Germany. He was the son of Jacob Daube, of Freiburg (whose family probably migrated generations earlier from France), and Selma Ascher of Nördlingen, whose family descended directly from Rabbi Meir of Rothenburg, the Maharam.

He earned degrees from the University of Freiburg and the University of Gottingen in 1932. Daube's early teachers included Otto Lenel, who "encouraged" him to take up the study of legal history in the first place, according to Daube's notes in his first published book, Studies in Biblical Law. Daube goes on to thank Professors Johannes Hempel and Wolfgang Kunkel of the University of Göttingen, who trained Daube in rigorous scholarly methods.

Daube fled Germany for England in 1933, but made several trips back to Europe to help bring out family members, friends, and mere acquaintances, with the assistance of Cambridge professors, fellows, and students, but especially the then-graduate student Philip Grierson. He earned his doctorate from the University of Cambridge in 1936. The influence of C.H. Dodd, whom Daube first met at Cambridge, guided Daube all his life; also at Cambridge, F. S. Marsh and Stanley Arthur Cook were important influences on Daube. And, finally, Professor William Warwick Buckland: "to him, in love," Daube dedicates his first book.

== Career ==
From 1938 to 1946, Daube was a fellow of Gonville and Caius College, Cambridge. Later in life he was made an honorary fellow, in 1974. From 1946 to 1951 he was a lecturer in law at Cambridge. From 1951 to 1955 he served as a professor of jurisprudence at the University of Aberdeen.

In 1955, Daube earned a master's degree from the University of Oxford and became a fellow of All Souls College, where he was made Regius Professor of Civil Law at Oxford.

In 1970, at the height of his career, he left his fellowship at All Souls College and his chair, Regius Professor of Civil Law, and moved to California, where he became Professor-in-Residence at the University of California, Berkeley's law school, then known as Boalt Hall, where he taught for the rest of his life. He retired in 1994.

== Personal life and death ==
Daube married in 1936 and divorced in 1964; he had three sons. (Daube's eldest son, Jonathan, has the middle name, "Maharam.") Daube was an in-law of Leo Strauss (one of Selma Ascher's siblings married into the Strauss family of Amöneburg-Kirchhain-Marburg). Daube was critical in getting Strauss out of Nazi Germany by helping to find him a position at the University of Cambridge in 1935.

He married again in 1986, marrying Helen Smelser (Margolis), prior wife of Neil Smelser.

Daube died on 24 February 1999, in Pleasant Hill, California. He was buried in the Orthodox Jewish Cemetery of Oakland, California.

== Studies in Biblical Law ==
The first chapter of Daube's first major book, Studies in Biblical Law, titled "Law in the Narratives," phrased in polite language, nonetheless starts with a revolutionary claim: all scholars since Henry Maine say that there is no separation of law and religion in "primitive," or ancient, legal systems. But, Daube notes, this is a generalization based upon the study of law in the Bible, and the Bible, after all, is "a collection of literature arranged by priests and prophets." They, naturally enough, he continues, "subordinated law to religion; indeed, they represented legal rules as religious rules, destined to guide God’s chosen people." But, he asks, "Is it safe to argue that because the devout authors of the Bible saw law as part of religion, law must have formed part of religion in the Hebrew state?" In answering this, he says, legal historians must go beyond the Bible, using the comparative method.

But, adds Daube, this application of the comparative method is not enough. Because "the Bible is an anthology compiled by priests and prophets, who were neither competent nor even desirous to formulate an accurate exposition of Hebrew law," one must first find out something about the true Hebrew law, separating it "from the dress in which priests and prophets have handed it down to us, like assembling a jigsaw puzzle from scattered fragments." The result of such an inquiry would likely show that the religious character of the law was not originally in it, but due to the theological tendencies of the authors of the Bible. Why, he concludes, should one assume the law sprang from religion rather than religion from the law? This question marks an important step: Biblical legal scholarship is not to be confined to pious exegesis of a text whose sacred character always makes its status primary.

Rather, Biblical law is a field of legal study, of rational inquiry, like any other field of legal study, and must be approached with the same analytical tools and methods. Moreover, this sacred text is not the authoritative statement of Hebrew law, for priestly transmission has distorted the law, the law that had an independent existence in the Israelite state. That law must be recovered from the Biblical narratives by careful juristic analysis.

Daube begins with examples of how that recovery ought to take place. He first looks at the narrative of Joseph and his brothers, showing how it can be understood in the context of principles of the law of custodianship, which provide the implicit legal categories utilized by the text and determine the contours of the action it recounts. And off he goes, inaugurating fifty years of path-breaking scholarship.

== Work ==
Daube made seminal contributions to three fields—Biblical and Talmudic law; New Testament studies; and Roman law. Calum Carmichael, professor of comparative literature at Cornell and Daube's literary executor, describes his memoir of Daube—Ideas and the Man: Remembering David Daube—as "an attempt to convey the spirit of enlightenment that David Daube exuded in all his work and conversation. Outstanding law professor, classical scholar par excellence, ecumenical religious thinker, leading Talmudic scholar, skilled linguist, great humanist of the law, a brilliant literary critic, the foremost Roman lawyer of his day."

According to Carmichael, on account of Daube's knowledge of Aramaic and the Talmud, Daube was invited to attend the New Testament seminar run by C.H. Dodd at Cambridge. It aroused in him an absorbing interest in the rabbinic background to Christianity. New Testament studies was the area in which he was to make his most original contribution to scholarship, in his eyes also a contribution to Jewish–Christian relations, according to Tony Honoré. Daube reinterpreted many New Testament texts in the light of Talmudic scholarship. The Christian scriptures could be reappraised as a form of Jewish literature, which he called "New Testament Judaism."

W. D. Davies focused on this in his tribute to his teacher on his death: "It is the complexity in David that made him so magical. It is not surprising then that it was this most Jewish of scholars, who taught us that Christianity, is a New Testament Judaism—a strikingly pregnant phrase that he invented and which sums up best perhaps his legacy and the near revolution that he introduced into New Testament studies." In 1962–1964, Daube gave the Gifford Lectures on Natural Theology.

== Students ==
In addition to Carmichael and the late W.D. Davies, Daube's students include the late C.K. Barrett, Durham (UK); Saul Berman, Yeshivat Chovevei Torah; Davi Ascher Strauss Bernstein, University of Chicago; David Cohen, UC-Berkeley; Martin Evans, Stanford; William Frankel; (A.M.) Tony Honoré, Regius Professor of Civil Law (Oxford); Bernard Jackson, Manchester and Liverpool; Lee Kuan Yew, longtime prime minister—and "father of"—Singapore; Fergus Millar, Oxford; John T. Noonan, Jr., UC-Berkeley/United States Court of Appeals for the Ninth Circuit; Stephen Passamaneck, Hebrew Union College-Jewish Institute of Religion; the late Lord Rodger (Alan Rodger, Baron Rodger of Earlsferry), Justice of the Supreme Court of the United Kingdom; E.P. Sanders, Duke; Peter Stein, Regius Professor of Civil Law (Cambridge); Géza Vermes, Oxford; Alan Watson, law faculties at the universities of Georgia, Edinburgh, and Belgrade; Reuven Yaron, Hebrew University of Jerusalem.

== Pedagogy ==
Bernard Jackson testifies: "For two years, I submitted material on a weekly or fortnightly basis. As was his normal pattern with research students, [Daube] would invite me for lunch at All Souls, then spend most of the rest of the afternoon analysing and criticising my work line by line. No more intense or productive supervision could be imagined. I owe everything I may have done subsequently to this foundation. Alan Watson has recorded his enduring sense of fear of disappointing Daube in approaching these sessions. My own recollection is that of the feeling with which I always emerged. However devastating the criticism may have been – and never without justification – Daube always concluded with sincere and persuasive words of encouragement, which made me ready, even eager, to commence the next cycle of destruction.

"He was a warm, wise and generous mentor, whose support went far beyond doctoral supervision and subsequent academic advancement. He did not distance himself from the personal lives of his pupils, both in joy and sorrow. He spoke at [my wedding], but what stands out in my mind is not merely the studied flattery of his speech, but the manner in which he spoke informally to members of our respective families, without a hint of condescension but rather with genuine interest and human feeling."

== Education ==
- Berthold-Gymnasium, Freiburg
- Universities of Freiburg and Göttingen (Dr jur 1932)
- PhD University of Cambridge 1936

== Other posts and honours ==
- 1953–1999 Member, Academic Board, Institute of Jewish Affairs
- 1957 Fellow of the British Academy
- 1957–8 President: Société d'Histoire des Droits de l'Antiquité
- 1961 Founder-President, B'nai B'rith Oxford Lodge
- 1964 Honorary D. Litt., University of Leicester
- 1970 Honorary Member, Royal Irish Academy
- 1971 DHL: Hebrew Union College
- 1973 Honorary Fellow, Oxford Centre for Postgraduate Hebrew Studies
- 1979 Fellow: American Academy for Jewish Research
- 1983–5 President: Jewish Law Association

== Publications ==
=== Books ===
- Daube, David (1944). Studies in Biblical Law. Cambridge, UK: Cambridge University Press. OCLC 780837218.
- ——— (1949). Rabbinic Methods of Interpretation and Hellenistic Rhetoric. Hebrew Union College Annual. Vol. 22. Cincinnati, OH: Hebrew Union College. OCLC 935807811.
- ——— (1956). The Defence of Superior Orders in Roman Law. Regius Chair Inaugural Lecture, 1955. Oxford: Clarendon Press. OCLC 9374302.
- ——— (1956). The New Testament and Rabbinic Judaism. Jewish people: history, religion, literature.; Jordan lectures in comparative religion. Vol. 2. New York: Arno Press. ISBN 9780405052576. OCLC 642864456.
- ——— (1956). Forms of Roman Legislation. Oxford: Clarendon Press. OCLC 497369.
- ——— (1960). Sin, Ignorance and Forgiveness in the Bible. London: Liberal Jewish Synagogue. ISBN 9780598660787.
- ——— (1963). The Exodus Pattern in the Bible. All Souls Studies. Vol. 2. London: Faber and Faber. OCLC 327982.
- ——— (1964). Suddenness and Awe in Scripture: Robert Waley Cohen Memorial Lecture, 1963. Council of Christians and Jews. OCLC 1063922449.
- ——— (1964). The Sudden in the Scriptures. Leiden: E.J. Brill. OCLC 350719.
- ——— (1965). Collaboration with Tyranny in Rabbinic Law. Newcastle upon Tyne University Publications; Riddell memorial lectures, 37th series. London & New York: Oxford University Press. OCLC 978197.
- ——— (1966). He That Cometh. St. Pauls Lecture. Vol. 5. London: London Diocesan Council for Christian-Jewish Understanding.
- ——— (1968). The Significance of the Afikoman. London: Union of Liberal and Progressive Synagogues.
- ——— (1969). Roman Law: Linguistic, Social, and Philosophical Aspects. J. H. Gray Lectures, 1966-7. Edinburgh & Chicago, IL: Edinburgh University Press & Aldine Pub. Co. ISBN 9780852240519. OCLC 22054.
- ——— (1971). Legal Problems in Medical Advance. Lionel Cohen Lectures, Universiṭah ha-ʻIvrit bi-Yerushalayim. Vol. 16. Jerusalem: Magnes Press.
- ——— (1972). Civil Disobedience in Antiquity. Messenger Lectures on the Evolution of Civilization, Cornell University, 1971. Edinburgh: Edinburgh University Press. – based on his Messenger Lectures at Cornell)
- ——— (1973). Ancient Hebrew fables: the inaugural lecture of the Oxford Centre for Postgraduate Hebrew Studies, delivered in Corpus Christi College, 17 May 1973. [Oxford, UK: Oxford University Press. OCLC 18585426.
- ——— (1975). Wine in the Bible. St. Paul's lecture. Vol. 13. Oxford: Church Army Press. OCLC 13949609.
- ——— (1976). Medical and Genetic Ethics: three historical vignettes. Oxford: Oxford Centre for Postgraduate Hebrew Studies. OCLC 2800604.
- ——— (1977). Duty of Procreation. Eugene, OR: Wipf & Stock Publishers. ISBN 9781610975087. OCLC 748935571.
- ——— (1977). Typologie im Werk des Flavius Josephus. Sitzungsberichte der Bayerischen Akademie der Wissenschaften, Philosophisch-Historische Klasse, 1977-6. München: Bayerische Akademie der Wissenschaften. ISBN 9783769614879. OCLC 645229255.
- ——— (1981). Ancient Jewish Law. Norman and Sadie Lee program in Jewish and western civilization. Leiden: E. J. Brill. ISBN 9789004065314. OCLC 8650863.
- ——— (1983). Die Geburt der Detektivgeschichte aus dem Geiste der Rhetorik (trans The Birth Of The Detective Story). Konstanz: Universitätsverlag Konstanz. ISBN 3879402418. OCLC 17149429.
- ——— (1984). Das Alte Testament im Neuen: Aus jüdischer Sicht. Konstanz: Universitatsverlag Konstanz. ISBN 9783879402571.
- ——— (1984). Sons and Strangers. Boston: University School of Law, Institute of Jewish Law. OCLC 746869837.
- ———; Carmichael, Calum M. (1986). Witnesses in Bible and Talmud. Oxford Centre papers. Oxford: Oxford Centre for Postgraduate Hebrew. OCLC 731034802.
- ——— (1987). Appeasement or Resistance and other essays on New Testament Judaism. Berkeley, CA: University of California Press. ISBN 9780520061583. OCLC 1025287821.
- ——— (2008). Carmichael, Calum M. (ed.). The Deed and the Doer in the Bible: David Daube's Gifford Lectures, Volume 1. Philadelphia, PA: Templeton Foundation Press. ISBN 9781599472256. OCLC 730520009.
- ——— (2010). Carmichael, Calum M. (ed.). Law and Wisdom in the Bible: David Daube's Gifford Lectures, Volume 2. Philadelphia, PA: Templeton Foundation Press. ISBN 9781599473451. OCLC 762577011.

=== Edited by ===
- ———; Davies, W. D., eds. (1956). The Background of the New Testament and its Eschatology: Studies in Honour of C. H. Dodd. Cambridge, UK: Cambridge University Press. OCLC 376862.
- ———, ed. (1959). Studies in the Roman Law of Sale: Dedicated to the Memory of Francis de Zulueta. Oxford: Clarendon Press. OCLC 2889012.

=== Chapters ===
- ——— (1953). "Alexandrian Methods of Interpretation and the Rabbis". Festschrift Hans Leward: bei Vollendung des vierzigsten Amtsjahres als ordentlicher Professor im Oktober 1953. Basel: Helbing & Lichtenhahn. pp. 25–44.

=== Journal articles ===
- ——— (1959). "The Earliest Structures of the Gospels". New Testament Studies. 5 (3). Cambridge: Studiorum Novi Testamenti Societas: 174–87. doi:10.1017/S0028688500006421. S2CID 170181216.
- ——— (1971). "Dissent in Bible and Talmud". California Law Review. Lecture at Brandeis University. 59 (3): 784–94. doi:10.2307/3479603. JSTOR 3479603.

== Festschriften ==
- Daube Noster: Essays in Legal History for David Daube, 1974 (ed. Alan Watson)
- Studies in Jewish Legal History: Essays in Honour of David Daube, 1974 (ed. Bernard Jackson)
- Donum Gentilicium: New Testament Studies in Honour of David Daube, 1978 (eds. Ernst Bammel, C.K. Barrett, and W.D. Davies)
- Essays on Law and Religion: The Berkeley and Oxford Symposia in Honour of David Daube, 1993 (ed. Calum M. Carmichael)

== Memorial volumes ==
- Law for All Times: Essays in Memory of David Daube, 2004. ISBN 978-0-9764149-0-2 (ed. Ernest Metzger)
- David Daube: A Centenary Celebration, 2010. ISBN 978-0-9566423-0-1 (ed. Ernest Metzger)
