= Konrad Wolff =

German pianist and musicologist

- Born: 11 March 1907; Berlin, Germany
- Died: 23 October 1989 (aged 82); Cologne, West Germany
- Spouse: Ilse Bing (m. 1937)
- Parent: Martin Wolff

Konrad Wolff (11 March 1907 – 23 October 1989) was a German pianist and musicologist.

The son of Martin Wolff and Marguerite Jolowicz, he was born in Berlin, Germany, on 11 March 1907. From 1925 to 1930, he studied at the University of Heidelberg and the University of Berlin. He received his Doctor of Law degree at the University of Berlin, and forged lifelong friendships with classmates Stephan Kuttner and Hsu Dau-lin.

He studied piano under Josef Lomba, who had been a student of Franz Liszt, as well as under Bruno Elsner, and the Austrian pianist Artur Schnabel. In France, he studied at the Sorbonne in Paris (1934–1935), and met and married the photographer Ilse Bing. Together they moved to the United States in 1941.

Although he performed as a concert pianist and in chamber music groups, he devoted himself to teaching and research. He was a faculty member at Westchester Conservatory (1949–1954), Drew University, New Jersey (1952–1962), and Peabody Conservatory (1963–1974), as well as teaching at Smith College and Montclair State University (NJ). In 1972, his major work on Artur Schnabel was published, "Schnabel's Interpretation of Piano Music." In 1983, he published his second book, "Masters of the Keyboard."

He died in Cologne, West Germany, where he had travelled to lecture and perform, on 23 October 1989.
