= Martin Wolff =

German lawyer (1872–1953)

- Born: 26 September 1872; Berlin, Germany
- Died: 20 July 1953 (aged 80); London, Great Britain
- Occupations: Jurist, professor
- Spouse: Marguerite Jolowicz (m. 1906)
- Children: Konrad Wolff (b. 1907, d. 1989); Victor Wolff (b. 1911, d. 1944)

Martin Wolff (26 September 1872 – 20 July 1953) was a professor of law at the University of Berlin in Germany. In 1935, he was prematurely retired from his post by the Nazis, and emigrated to Britain in 1938, where All Souls College, Oxford supported him with a scholarship. He specialized in private international law, property law, commercial law and comparative law, writing numerous works, including standard works in German and English.

== Life ==
=== Early life and studies (1872–1903) ===
Martin Wolff, the son of Wilhelm Wolff and Lehna Wolff (née Ball) was born in Berlin on 26 September 1872, into the family of a Jewish businessman and brought up in the Jewish faith. He attended the Collège Français in Berlin and studied Law in Berlin. In 1894, he was awarded a doctorate from the law faculty based on a dissertation on the beneficium excussionis realis. In 1900, he obtained his habilitation in Berlin, with the thesis Der Bau auf fremdem Boden, insbesondere der Grenzüberbau nach dem Bürgerlichen Gesetzbuche für das deutsche Reich auf geschichtlicher Grundlage [Building on the Property of Another, in Particular Building that Encroaches on Adjoining Land According to the Civil Code for the German Reich on a Historical Basis].

=== Academic career, 1903–1938 ===
In 1903, he was appointed as an associate professor. About this time, he wrote his treatise on property law in Enneccerus–Kipp–Wolff, which became a standard work for almost half a century and was translated into Spanish in 1937. He married Marguerite Jolowicz in 1906. In 1907, he had a son, Konrad Wolff, who later became a famous pianist. He did not receive a full professorship until 1914. In 1919 he moved to Bonn, but returned to Berlin in 1921, being appointed Professor for Civil Law, Commercial Law, and Private International Law. Wolff was regarded as an outstanding lecturer, his lectures always being full to overflowing. When the Nazis seized power, his lectures began to be disrupted. On 4 June and 5 June 1933, student SA men interrupted his lecture and threatened students who wished to attend. When Wolff started speaking, he could not be heard. More than a hundred hecklers whistled and shouted "Juda verrecke." Only after the rector, Eduard Kohlrausch, intervened was Wolff able to continue with the lecture (Wolff later stated that Kohlrausch was the only university teacher to support him). But the disturbances continued.

In 1935, because of his Jewish descent Wolff, along with his colleague Ernst Rabel, was ousted from his professorship by the new dean of the Law Faculty, the fanatical Nazi Wenzeslaus von Gleispach, although neither he nor his colleague came under the proscriptions of the Civil Service Restoration Act, because they had had tenure since before 1914. The dismissal was nevertheless ordered by the education ministry.

=== Emigration to England 1938–1953 ===
In 1938, he finally emigrated to the United Kingdom, never to return to Germany. He was made a fellow of All Souls College, Oxford. In 1945, he published Private International Law, a comprehensive description of English private international law. In 1947, he became a British citizen. In 1953, he was awarded an honorary doctorate from Oxford University.

He died in London on 20 July 1953. He was survived by his wife, the former Marguerite Jolowicz (1883–1964).

== Works ==
Wolff wrote numerous articles on commercial, company, family, property, and insurance law, as well as on private international law. In particular, his textbooks on family and inheritance law were very successful and were reprinted several times. His textbook on property law was continued by his pupil Ludwig Raiser.

=== Das Sachenrecht (1910) ===
Wolff's Das Sachenrecht [Property Law] was first published in 1910, and it soon became a standard work. Between 1910 and 1923, it was published in nine editions and sold 37,000 copies. It is characterized by dogmatic rigour and systematic completeness. Wolff was criticized for ignoring economic and historical relationships and the connections to public law.

=== Private International Law (1945) ===
Wolff's Private International Law was very well received in England. However, the typically Continental strictly systematic approach was somewhat off-putting for the English reader; in particular, the detailed discussion of problems that had not yet occurred in English case law was criticized:

Dr. Wolff is more at home in discussing unsolved problems than in handling English case law.

— J. H. C. Morris

However, this made it relevant for English courts when gaps in the law needed to be filled. For instance, Wolff's book has also been cited in decisions of the House of Lords.

== Publications (selection) ==
- Der Bau auf fremdem Boden (1900)
- Das Sachenrecht (1910)
- Das Familienrecht (1912)
- Internationales Privatrecht (1933)
- Private International Law (1945)
- Traité de droit comparé (3 volumes) (1950–1952)

== Honours ==
- 1952: Knight Commanders of the Order of Merit of the Federal Republic of Germany
- 1952: Honorary Doctor of Civil Law from Oxford University
