= James Bouchier =

English legal academic (1683–1736)

James Bouchier (1683–1736) was an English academic. He was the University of Oxford's Regius Professor of Civil Law from 1723 until his death.

== Biography ==
Bouchier was born in 1683 to Thomas Bouchier, who had then been Regius Professor of Civil Law at the University of Oxford for 11 years and principal of the university's St Alban Hall for five. He entered St Alban Hall in October 1698 before receiving the degree of Bachelor of Civil Law from All Souls College in January 1706. In 1711 he took the degree of Doctor of Civil Law, and the next year his father arranged for him to succeed to the regius professorship. Upon his father's death in 1723 he also succeeded as principal of St Alban Hall. As principal, he was denounced by Thomas Hearne, who in January 1726 said that Bouchier was the only scholar present in the hall, and "a proud, impudent Blockhead".

Bouchier died on 19 August 1736.
