= Marguerite Wolff (legal scholar) =

German-British legal scholar (1883–1964)

- Born: Marguerite Jolowicz; 10 December 1883; London, England
- Died: 21 May 1964 (aged 80); London, England
- Occupation: British legal scholar
- Spouse: Martin Wolff (m. 1906; died 1953)
- Children: Konrad Wolff
- Relatives: Herbert Felix Jolowicz (brother)

Marguerite Wolff (née Jolowicz; 10 December 1883 – 21 May 1964) was a German-British legal scholar and translator of Jewish descent.

== Biography ==
Wolff was born in London on 10 December 1883. Her brother was the Roman law scholar Herbert Felix Jolowicz. She studied English at Cambridge, presumably at Newnham College. In 1906, she married Martin Wolff, a law professor at the University of Berlin.

From January 1925 to the end of April 1933, she was employed at the Kaiser Wilhelm Institute for Foreign Public Law and International Law, initially as academic assistant with a managerial role in setting up the Institute, then as senior research scholar (Referentin) with a brief for US and UK law. She also translated publications and contributed to the editing of the Institute's journal. When the Nazi Party came to power in April 1933, she was removed from her position at the Institute. She returned to Great Britain in 1935. Her husband followed in the autumn of 1938. Wolff continued to edit and translate legal works, attracting high praise from reviewers. She had also served as translator at The Hague after World War I and oversaw the translation of the court proceedings at the Nuremberg trials.

Wolff died in a London nursing home on May 21, 1964 at the age of 80.

Her son Konrad became a famous pianist.

== Published works ==
- Wolff, Marguerite (1928). Das Preßrecht Großbritanniens. Die Preßgesetze des Erdballs (in German). Vol. II. Berlin: Georg Stilke. doi:10.1515/9783112392744. ISBN 978-3-11-239274-4.
