= Giles Sweit =

English lawyer and academic

Sir Giles Sweit (1586 – 13 September 1672), sometimes spelt Sweet or Swett, was an English lawyer and academic, Principal of St Alban Hall, Oxford, for many years, and also Regius Professor of Civil Law in the University of Oxford and Dean of the Arches.

== Career ==
Sweet matriculated at St John's College, Oxford, on 3 December 1602, aged sixteen. By 23 January 1604/05, when he graduated BA, he had migrated to Oriel College, and he proceeded to MA by seniority on 30 April 1611. He graduated as a Bachelor and Doctor of Civil Law from St Mary Hall on 30 June 1632 and the same year became an advocate of Doctors' Commons. In 1641, he was commissary to the vice-chancellor of the university. He was principal of St Alban Hall between 1641 and 1664, and in 1660 became Dean of the Arches. In 1661 he was appointed by King Charles II as regius professor of civil law, an office he held until his death, and also as a prebendary of Salisbury Cathedral. He was knighted on 25 March 1664.

Sweet died on 13 September 1672 and was buried in the church of Barn Elms, Surrey. He was succeeded as Regius Professor by Thomas Bouchier, who had previously deputised for him when he carried out his judicial duties in London.
