= Alberico Gentili =

Italian jurist (1552–1608)

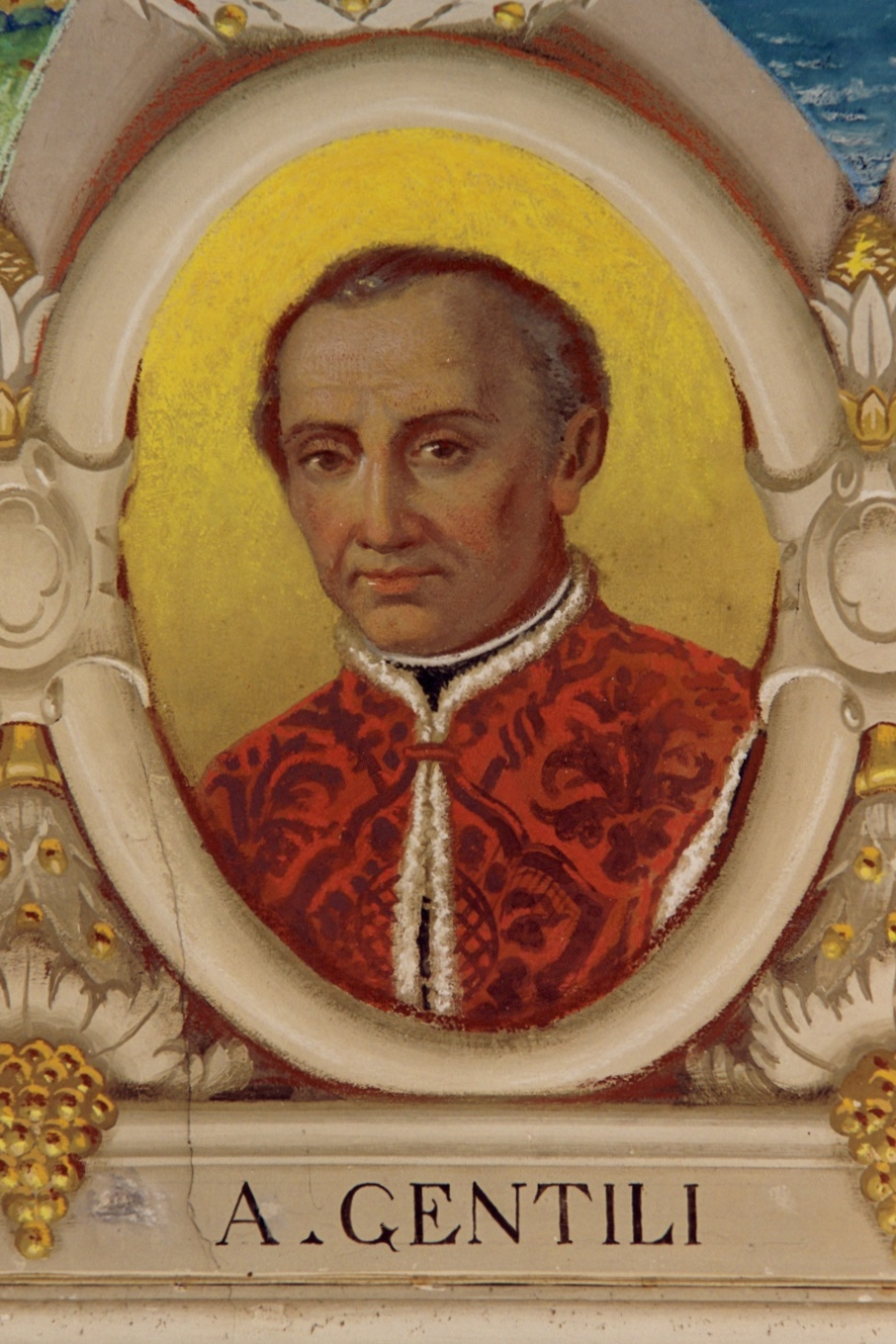
- Engraved portrait of Gentili

Regius Professor of Civil Law
- In office 1587–1608 (his death)
- Monarch: Elizabeth I
- Preceded by: William Mowse
- Succeeded by: John Budden

Personal details
- Born: 14 January 1552 San Ginesio, Macerata, Italy
- Died: 19 June 1608 (aged 56) London, England
- Spouse: Hester de Peigne
- Relations: Scipione Gentili (brother)
- Children: Roberto Gentili
- Parent(s): Dr Matteo Gentili; Lucrezia Petrelli
- Education: University of Perugia
- Known for: Substantial contributions to the theory of international law, human rights and war; First writer on public international law; Regius Professor

Alberico Gentili (14 January 1552 – 19 June 1608) was an Italian jurist, a tutor of Queen Elizabeth I, and a standing advocate to the Spanish Embassy in London, who served as the Regius Professor of Civil Law at the University of Oxford for 21 years. He is regarded as the co-founder of the field of international law, and thus is known as the "Father of international law".

The first medieval writer on public international law, Gentili became in 1587 the first non-Englishman to be a Regius Professor. He also authored numerous books, which are recognized to be among the most essential sources for international legal doctrines, but also include theological and literary material.

== Early life and family ==
Gentili was born into a noble family in the town of San Ginesio, Macerata, Italy. It has been conjectured that Gentili's mother might have been the source of his early love for jurisprudence, but it was his father, Matteo Gentili, a physician, who assumed the role of his tutor in Latin and Greek. His father was a protestant. He obtained a doctoral degree in law at the University of Perugia at the age of 20.

== Career ==
After his graduation, Gentili was elected as the chief judge of Ascoli, but he then settled in his native town, where he filled various responsible offices. He was commissioned to prepare a revised version of the statutory laws of his home town, a task which he completed in 1577. Both father and son belonged to a confraternity suspected of meeting for the discussion of opinions hostile to the Roman church. The Inquisition was upon the track of the heretics, and Gentili, together with his father and one of his brothers, Scipione Gentili, was forced to leave Italy because of their Protestant beliefs.

The three first went to Laibach, now in Slovenia, then the capital of the Austrian Duchy of Carniola. From there, Alberico went on to the German university towns of Tübingen and Heidelberg. At their first halting place, Laibach (now Ljubljana), Matteo, doubtless through the influence of his brother-in-law, Nicolo Petrelli, a jurist high in favour with the court, was appointed chief physician of the duchy of Carniola. In the meantime, the papal authorities had excommunicated the fugitives and soon procured their expulsion from Austrian territory. Early in 1580, Alberico set out for England, preceded by a reputation that procured him offers of professorships at Heidelberg and at Tübingen, where Scipio was left to commence his university studies. Alberico reached London in August, with introductions to Giovanni Battista Castiglione, the Italian tutor to Queen Elizabeth I. Gentili soon became acquainted with Dr Tobias Matthew, the Archbishop of York. On 14 January 1581, Gentili was accordingly incorporated from Perugia as a doctor of civil law at Oxford, giving him the right to teach law, which he first exercised at St John's College, Oxford. Teaching at the English universities was then in Latin. Subsequently, Gentili was appointed as the Regius professor of civil law at Oxford by its Chancellor, Robert Dudley, 1st Earl of Leicester.

After a short stay in Wittenberg, Germany, Gentili returned to Oxford. In 1584, he was consulted by the English government as to the proper course to be pursued with Bernardino de Mendoza, the Spanish ambassador, who had been detected plotting against Elizabeth. He chose the topic to which his attention had thus been directed as a subject for a disputation when the Earl of Leicester and Sir Philip Sidney visited the schools at Oxford in the same year; and six months later this was expanded into a book, the De legationibus libri tres. As a result, Mendoza was expelled from England. Gentili held the regius professorship until his death, but he turned more and more to practical legal work in London from about 1590. He practised in the High Court of Admiralty, where the continental civil law rather than the English common law was applied. In 1600, Gentili was called to the Honourable Society of Gray's Inn.

== Personal life ==
In 1589, Gentili married Hester de Peigne, a French Huguenot. Their eldest son was Robert Gentilis, born 1590, who graduated from Oxford at the age of twelve and was made a Fellow of All Souls College, Oxford, at the age of seventeen through the influence of his father. Gentili died in London and was buried in the Church of St Helen Bishopsgate in the City of London.

== Works ==
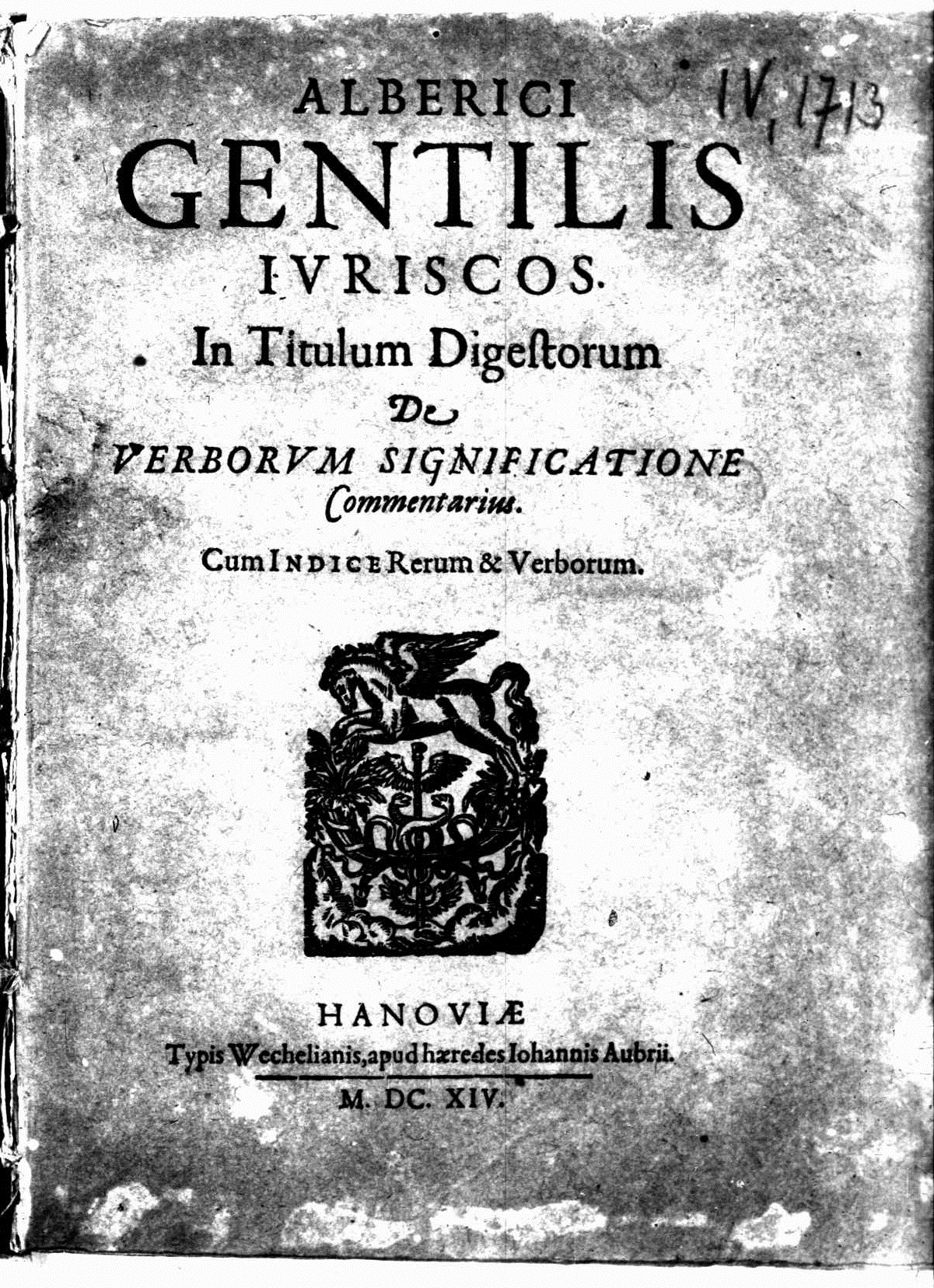
In titulum Digestorum De verborum significatione commentarius, 1614

In 1582, Gentili published De Juris Interpretibus Dialogi Sex. This book shows Gentili as a staunch supporter of the bartolist method and an opponent of the French humanist jurists like Jacques Cujas, who applied philological methods to the sources of Roman law. Gentili's first book on issues of international law was De Legationibus Libri Tres, published in 1585. Between 1588 and 1589 Gentili published three booklets collected as De Jure Belli Commentationes Tres. An enhanced edition appeared under the title De Jure Belli Libri Tres in 1598. It is considered his main work and a classic of public international law. The book is praised for its modernity and its skilful use of civil law concepts but also for its closeness to the actual practice of international law. Gentili published De armis Romanis in two parts in 1590 and 1599. While less studied than his earlier works, De armis Romanis has been the focus of recent scholarly attention by Christopher N. Warren, Diego Panizza and others.

After his death, Alberico Gentili's brother Scipione, who had become a professor of law at Altdorf, published a collection of notes on cases Alberico had worked on as an advocate for the Spanish embassy. The book bears the title Hispanicae Advocationis Libri Duo and appeared in 1613. All the books mentioned above are available in modern editions or reprints:

- De Iuris Interpretibus Dialogi Sex. Edited by Guido Astuti. Torino 1937.
- De Legationibus Libri Tres. With an introduction by Ernest Nys. New York 1924.
- De Iure Belli Libri Tres. 2 Vols. Text and Translation by John Rolfe. Oxford 1933.
- Hispanicae Advocationis Libri Duo. Text and Translation by Frank Frost Abbott. New York 1921.
- Ad titulum Codicis ad legem juliam de adulteriis Commentarius, in G. Minnucci, Alberico Gentili tra mos italicus e mos gallicus. L'inedito Commentaro ad l. Juliam de adulteriis, Bologna 2002.

Giovanni Minnucci (a cura di), De papatu Romano Antichristo Recognovit e codice autographo bodleiano D'Orville 607, Studi e Testi, nº 17, Milano, Archivio per la Storia del diritto medioevale e moderno, 2018, p. CLXII+352. Others:

- In titulum Digestorum De verborum significatione commentarius (in Latin). Hanau: Andreas Wechel, Erben & Johann Aubry, Erben. 1614.

== Legacy ==
Gentili's fame as an international lawyer was soon eclipsed by the publication of Hugo Grotius' seminal work De Iure Belli ac Pacis in 1625 even though Grotius owed much to Gentili's writings. It was only in the 19th century that interest in Gentili revived, to a great extent because of Sir Thomas Erskine Holland (1835–1926), who in 1874 devoted his inaugural lecture as professor of international law and diplomacy in Oxford to Gentili. According to a 2022 study, Gentili's work on the laws of war were of marginal interest until the late 19th century, when a group of international lawyers used his writings in part to establish the contemporary laws of war. Since then, numerous books and articles have been written about Gentili and his work. In his hometown, a monument was erected in his honour.

== Statue of Alberico Gentili ==
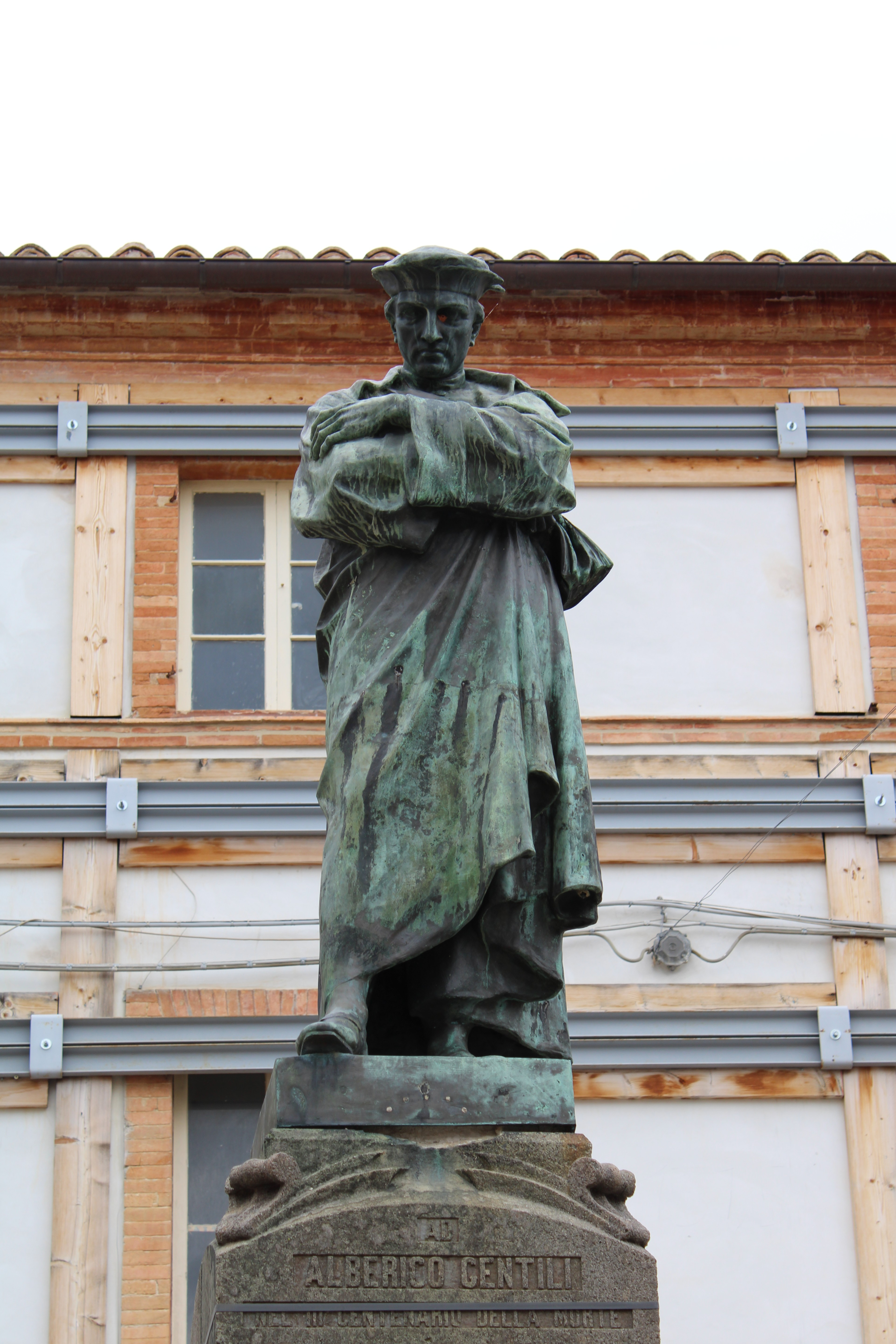
Statue of Alberico Gentili

The statue of Alberico Gentili is a monument made by Giuseppe Guastalla in 1908 in view of the third centenary of his death. The statue played a symbolic role during the Italian campaign, precisely during the liberation of San Ginesio by the Allies. The plaque added in 2009 briefly mentions the story:

Alberico Gentili, who died in London in 1608, was the first to advocate humane treatment for Prisoners of War. After the Italian Armistice in September 1943, thousands of P.O.W.s escaped from their prison camps. The country people in and around San Ginesio and all over German-occupied Italy gave them food and shelter, in spite of the danger in so doing.

Their bravery, compassion and self-sacrifice will never be forgotten by the Allied Prisoners of War, nor by their descendants.

Monte San Martino Trust - London. 2009
