= Hans Ankum =

Dutch legal scholar (1930–2019)

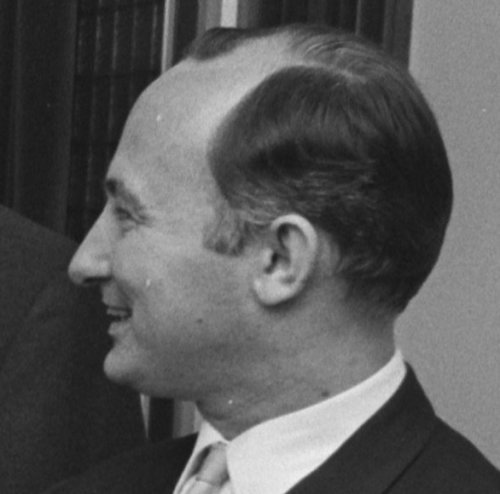
J.A. Ankum (1970)

Johan Albert "Hans" Ankum (23 July 1930 – 3 June 2019) was a Dutch legal scholar. He was professor of Roman law, history of jurisprudence and juridical papyrology at the University of Amsterdam between 1965 and 1995.

== Career ==
Ankum was born on 23 July 1930 in Amsterdam. At the University of Amsterdam he earned his PhD in Law in 1962 with a dissertation on the history of the Actio pauliana. He was researcher on juridical papyrology from 1960 to 1965 at the same university. Between 1965 and 1995 Ankum was professor of Roman law, history of jurisprudence and juridical papyrology. Together with Alan Watson he was seen as one of the most prominent Romanists of his generation.

Ankum became member of the Royal Netherlands Academy of Arts and Sciences in 1986. He died in Haarlem on 3 June 2019, aged 88.
