= Thomas Wenman =

Thomas Wenman may refer to:

- Thomas Wenman (MP for Westbury) (1745–1796), British member of parliament (MP), professor, natural historian, and antiquarian
- Thomas Wenman (MP for Buckingham) (c. 1548–1577), English country gentleman and briefly an MP
- Thomas Wenman, 2nd Viscount Wenman (1596–1665), English landowner and politician, MP multiple times for Brackley, and for Oxfordshire
