= John V. M. Sturdy =

English biblical scholar and academic (1933–1996)

John Vivian Mortland Sturdy (27 October 1933 – 6 July 1996) was an English biblical scholar and academic. He was Dean of Gonville and Caius College, Cambridge and in later years, also a part-time Librarian at the Faculty of Divinity based at St. John's College, on the corner of All Saints Passage.

Sturdy studied at Christ Church, Oxford. He married Jill Evans in 1961, and they had twelve children including nine adoptions.

Sturdy was executive editor of The Cambridge History of Judaism. He wrote the commentary on the Book of Numbers for The Cambridge Bible Commentary on the New English Bible; a review in the Scottish Journal of Theology suggested that he maintained "a good balance between being informative and being gently critical of some of the values expressed in the text."

Sturdy was working on a book on the dating of the New Testament when he died. This was a response to J. A. T. Robinson's 1976 book Redating the New Testament. Sturdy argued that the books of the New Testament were written later than the scholarly consensus believed. Sturdy's unfinished work was later published as Redrawing the Boundaries: The Date of Early Christian Literature (2007).

He died of heart failure on 6 July 1996.

Sturdy was a coin collector, and after his death his widow donated 1,751 twentieth-century world coins from his collection to the Fitzwilliam Museum.
