= Regius Professor of Civil Law (Oxford) =

Professorial chair at Oxford University

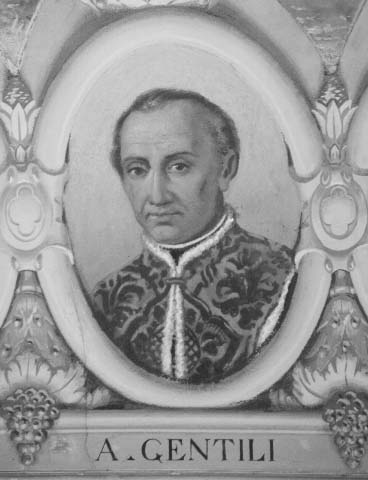
The Italian Alberico Gentili, appointed Regius Professor of Civil Law at Oxford in 1587

The Regius Chair of Civil Law, founded in the 1540s, is one of the oldest professorships at the University of Oxford.

== Foundation ==
The Regius Chair of Civil Law at Oxford was founded by King Henry VIII, who established five such Regius Professorships in the University, the others being the chairs of Divinity, Physic (Old English for Medicine), Hebrew and Greek. The stipend attached to the position was then forty pounds a year. Henry VIII put an end to the teaching of Canon law at both Oxford and Cambridge. Under statutes of 1549, the Regius Professor of Civil Law was to lecture four times a week between the hours of eight and nine in the morning on the Pandects, on the Code, or on the ecclesiastical laws of England. The requirement to give four lectures a week was repeated in the statutes of 1564 and of 1576. The professor was also to moderate at disputations in law.

The exact date of the chair's foundation is uncertain. Some sources say that John Story, the first professor, was appointed in about 1541. No foundation document survives, but in 1544 Robert Weston was recorded as acting as Story's deputy.

The holder of the Regius Professorship is still chosen by The Crown and is still appointed to teach Roman law, its principles and history, and some other branches of the law.

== First Professor ==
It is uncertain when the first Regius Professor, the Blessed John Story, was first appointed. The History of the University of Oxford says that it was by a signed bill, c. 1541, adding that, together with Robert Weston, Story was reappointed for life by letters patent dated 26 February 1546. Payments to Story as professor of Civil Law are found in the accounts of the Treasurer of the Court of Augmentations for the periods Michaelmas 1546 to Michaelmas 1550, part of 1553, and 1556–1557, and for fees and annuities in issues of the Exchequer for 1553–1557.

Story had a tempestuous career. Elected to parliament in 1547, in 1548 he opposed the anti-Roman Catholic laws of King Edward VI, was imprisoned, and on release fled to the Seventeen Provinces. The reign of the Roman Catholic Queen Mary I from July 1553 to November 1558 brought Story back into public life. He became a member of parliament again, and after Mary's death opposed the Act of Supremacy of 1559. He was again imprisoned, escaped, was recaptured, and fled again to the Low Countries, where he became a subject of Philip II of Spain. He was kidnapped by agents of Queen Elizabeth I, imprisoned in the Tower of London, where he was tortured, and finally in 1571 was hanged, drawn and quartered.

Story was beatified by Pope Leo XIII in 1886.

== Period of decline ==
Although prestigious, the Regius Chair has not always been effective for teaching purposes. In 1846, a select committee of the House of Commons began to inquire into the state of legal education in the United Kingdom, and its report later the same year showed the emptiness of the title of Regius Professor of Civil Law at Oxford at that time. Dr Joseph Phillimore, who had held the chair since 1809 and who continued to hold it until his death in 1855 at the age of eighty, admitted in a series of evasive replies to the select committee that his subject had not been taught at Oxford for almost a hundred years. Dr Philip Bliss, Registrar of the University, revealed that the university had no examinations in any "legal science". Although the degree of Bachelor of Civil Law was still awarded, the "disputations" which led to such an award were an empty formality.

One of Phillimore's 18th century predecessors, Robert Vansittart, a noted antiquarian and rake, was appointed Regius Professor in 1767 and held the chair until his death in 1789. He published antiquarian works, was a close acquaintance of Samuel Johnson, William Hogarth and Paul Whitehead, and was a participant in the debauchery of the Hellfire Club. Vansittart's successor, Thomas Francis Wenman (1745–1796), Regius Professor from 1789 until his death, is described in the Dictionary of National Biography as "one of the few students of natural history at Oxford" and was drowned in the River Cherwell on 8 April 1796, while collecting botanical specimens.

== Modern period ==
After the death of Phillimore in 1855, the situation improved somewhat. Although the next professor, Sir Travers Twiss, held degrees in Mathematics and Literae Humaniores, he came to the post directly from three years as professor of international law at King's College, London, where the teaching of law was taken more seriously than at Oxford. His international reputation led to Leopold II, king of the Belgians asking him to draft the constitution of the Congo Free State.

Twiss was succeeded in 1870 by James Bryce, 1st Viscount Bryce, a distinguished historian and Liberal politician who for a period combined the Regius chair of civil law with holding office as Parliamentary Under-Secretary of State for Foreign Affairs and who resigned the chair only in 1893, a year after joining William Ewart Gladstone's Cabinet.

In 1955, the distinguished German academic lawyer David Daube (1909–1999), a native of Freiburg im Breisgau, became the first foreign-born Regius Professor of Civil Law at Oxford since the 17th century. He was later a professor-in-residence at the University of California, Berkeley.

Daube was succeeded in 1971 by Tony Honoré (born 1921), a jurist known for his work on ownership, causation and Roman law, who remained in post until 1988. Although born in London, he was brought up in South Africa, fought in the Second World War and was severely wounded at the First Battle of El Alamein. His contributions to legal philosophy include sixteen books and more than a hundred articles.

In 1988, Peter Birks was appointed, holding office until his death in 2004. He was a specialist on the law of Restitution.

After a vacancy of more than a year, Boudewijn Sirks was appointed in December 2005 and took up the post in 2006, his previous career having been in teaching philosophy and law at the universities of Leiden, Amsterdam, Utrecht, and Frankfurt.

In 2015, Sirks was succeeded by Wolfgang Ernst, whose research focuses on Roman law.

== List of Regius Professors of Civil Law ==
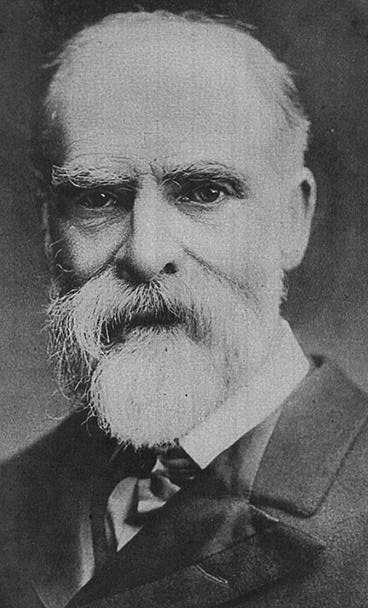
James Bryce, 1st Viscount Bryce, Regius Professor from 1870 to 1893

- c. 1541–1557: John Story (for much of that time jointly with Robert Weston and William Aubrey)
- 1546–1553: Robert Weston (jointly with John Story)
- 1553–1559: William Aubrey (for some of that period jointly with John Story)
- 1559–1566: John Griffith
- 1566–1577: Robert Lougher
- 1577–1586: Griffith Lloyd
- 1587–1608: Alberico Gentili
- 1611–1620: John Budden
- 1620–1661: Richard Zouch
- 1661–1672: Sir Giles Sweit
- 1672–1712: Thomas Bouchier
- 1712–1736: James Bouchier
- 1736–1752: Henry Brooke
- 1753–1767: Herbert Jenner
- 1767–1789: Robert Vansittart
- 1789–1796: Thomas Francis Wenman
- 1796–1809: French Laurence
- 1809–1855: Joseph Phillimore (1775–1855)
- 1855–1870: Sir Travers Twiss
- 1870–1893: James Bryce, 1st Viscount Bryce
- 1893–1919: Henry Goudy, author of the article on "Roman Law" in vol. 23 of the 11th ed. of the Encyclopædia Britannica (1911)
- 1919–1948: Francis de Zulueta
- 1948–1954: Herbert Felix Jolowicz
- 1955–1970: David Daube
- 1971–1988: Tony Honoré
- 1989–2004: Peter Birks
- July 2004 – February 2006: vacant
- 2006–2014: Boudewijn Sirks
- October 2015-October 2026: Wolfgang Ernst
- From October 2026: Wim Decock

== See also ==
- List of Professorships at the University of Oxford
- Regius Professor of Civil Law (Cambridge)
