= Otto Lenel =

German Jewish jurist and legal historian

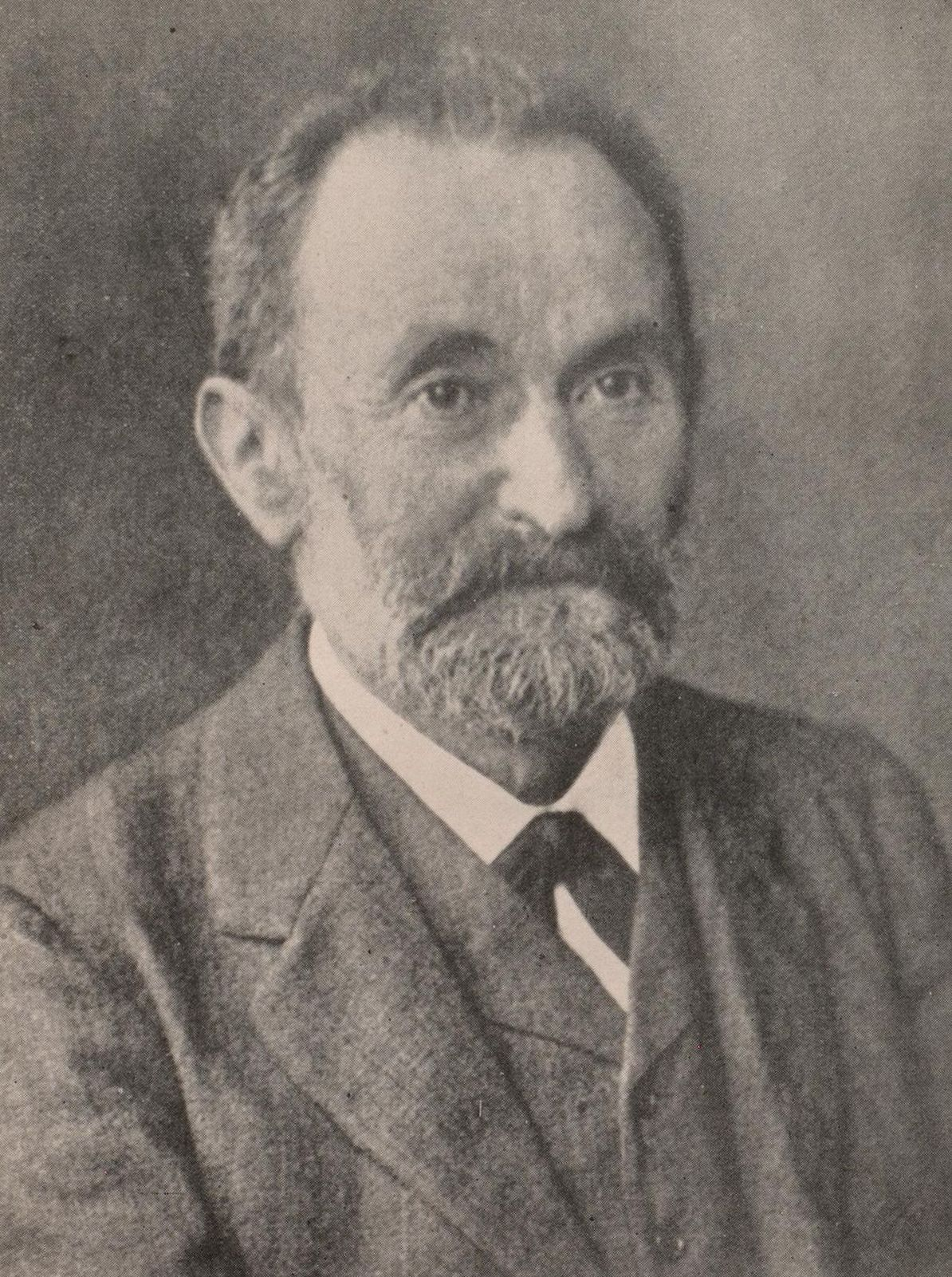
- Born: 13 December 1849; Mannheim, Baden, Germany
- Died: 7 February 1935 (aged 85); Freiburg im Breisgau, Baden, Germany
- Occupation: Jurist
- Spouse: Luise Eberstadt
- Children: Bertha Lenel (b. 1882); Paul Moritz Lenel (b. 1884); Rudolf Otto Lenel (b. 1886)

Otto Lenel (13 December 1849 – 7 February 1935) was a German Jewish jurist and legal historian. His most important achievements are in the field of Roman law. He founded a new area of research — the study of interpolations. He identified numerous interpolations to original texts. Lenel received particular attention for his reconstructive work on the Edictum Perpetuum (1883) and the Palingenesia Iuris Civilis (1889).

== Life and career ==
Otto Lenel was born in Mannheim, Germany on 13 December 1849. He was the son of Moritz Lenel and Caroline Scheuer. Lenel studied law at the universities of Heidelberg, Leipzig and Berlin. He fought as a volunteer soldier in the war against France in 1870/71. Lenel passed the first state examination in law in 1871, and the following year he received the degree of Dr. jur. In 1874 Lenel passed the second state examination in law. Two years later, he obtained the habilitation at the University of Leipzig.

In 1882, Lenel became famous when he won a prize which had been offered by the Bavarian Academy of Sciences with his reconstruction of the edict of the praetors (see below). Lenel became a professor at the University of Kiel in that same year. Two years later, he moved on to the University of Marburg. In 1885 he became a professor and taught at the University of Strassburg, which had become a German institution after the war of 1870/71 in which Lenel himself had fought. In 1895, he was rector of the University of Strassburg. 1907 he was called to Freiburg University.

At the occasion of the 50th anniversary of the award of his Dr. jur. degree, he was presented with a Festschrift. Ten years later, Lenel was given a second Festschrift. On his 80th birthday, Lenel received a gratulatory letter, which was signed by academics representing 20 countries of various continents and 100 universities. He was also made an honorary citizen of the city of Freiburg. After 1933, Lenel became a victim of Nazi racism. His daughter was forced out of her job as a nurse. The prosecutions by the Nazis broke his spirit. For the last 18 months of his life he was unable to continue his scholarly work. He died on 7 February 1935.

According to his wish, only his closest relatives attended his burial. Due to political circumstances, no obituary was published in Germany. After Lenel's death, the members of his family met a cruel fate in Nazi Germany: His widow of more than 80 years of age, Luise, née Eberstadt (born 25 February 1857 in Frankfurt) and his daughter Bertha Lenel (born 7 March 1882 in Freiburg) were sent on 22 October 1940 to an internment camp in Gurs, France. The widow died there on 7 November 1940. Bertha Lenel survived.

On the occasion of the 50th anniversary of Otto Lenel's death, a sign was affixed to his last residence at Holbeinstrasse 5 in Freiburg, Germany.

== Work ==
Lenel is best known for his reconstruction of the fundamental text of the Roman legal system, the so-called edictum perpetuum of the Roman praetors. The praetors were the government officials responsible for the administration of justice during the Roman Republic and the Principate. The edictum (or edict) was the text in which the newly elected praetor announced how he would handle his responsibilities. More precisely, the edict announced under what circumstances it would succeed and when it would fail. Originally, every praetor drafted his own edict but, over time, a standard text was established, which was regularly re-enacted by the new praetor. Even later, Emperor Hadrian commissioned a final redaction of the text and prohibited any further changes. The edict had thus changed its nature from being an announcement by the praetor himself to being a legal rule binding on the praetor himself, which made known to all citizens under what circumstances they could bring a successful action in the Roman courts. This text is called the edictum perpetuum (the eternal edict).

In later times, the edict lost its legal importance due to changes in procedural law. For that reason, the text of the edict was no longer copied and no complete text has come down to us. Similarly, most of the writings of the Roman jurists have only been conserved in fragments in Justinian's Digest.

Lenel both reconstructed the text of the edict and tried to establish the order in which the surviving fragments of legal writings had originally been presented before they were cut out and rearranged in the Digest. The reconstruction of the edict is the subject of his book Das edictum perpetuum. The results of his research on the writings of the Roman jurists are contained in the two volumes entitled Palingenesia juris civilis. The subjects of the two books are linked, because many books by Roman jurists were commentaries on the edict or at least they followed the structure of the edict. By studying the structure of the scholarly writings of the jurists, Lenel determined how the edict was structured and what provisions it contained.

Lenel's work is considered important for the history of Roman law. It enables modern scholars to consider the original context of the source texts and it helps us understand the technicalities of Rome's legal system.

In addition to his famous works on Roman law, Lenel also published some influential papers on modern German civil law.

== Books by Otto Lenel ==
- Über Ursprung und Wirkung der Exceptionen, 1876 [reprinted 1970]
- Das edictum perpetuum, 1883, 3rd ed. 1927.
- Palingenesia juris civilis, 2 vols., 1887–1889.
