= List of In Our Time programmes =

In Our Time is a radio discussion programme exploring a wide variety of historical, scientific, cultural, religious and philosophical topics, broadcast on BBC Radio 4 in the United Kingdom since 1998. It was hosted by Melvyn Bragg from its start until 3 July 2025, and by Misha Glenny from January 2026 onwards. All episodes are available to download as individual podcasts.

== Programmes ==
=== 1998–1999 ===
Broadcast date Listen again	Title	Contributors and positions held at time of broadcast
15 October 1998	War in the 20th Century	Michael Ignatieff, writer, broadcaster and biographer of Isaiah Berlin; Michael Howard, formerly Regius Professor of History, Oxford University and joint editor of the new Oxford History of the Twentieth Century
22 October 1998	Politics in the 20th Century	Gore Vidal, American writer, commentator and author of The Smithsonian Institution; Alan Clark, historian, politician and author of The Tories: Conservatives and the Nation State, 1922–97
29 October 1998	Science's Revelations	Richard Dawkins, evolutionary biologist, reader in Zoology and Fellow of New College, Oxford, Simonyi Professor for the Public Understanding of Science, Oxford University and author of Unweaving the Rainbow: Science, Delusion and the Appetite for Wonder; Ian McEwan, novelist and author of the Booker Prize-winning novel Amsterdam
5 November 1998	Science in the 20th century	John Gribbin, Visiting Fellow in Astronomy, University of Sussex and consultant to New Scientist; Mary Midgley, moral philosopher and former Senior Lecturer in Philosophy, University of Newcastle
12 November 1998	The City in the 20th Century	Peter Hall, Professor of Planning at the Bartlett School of Architecture and Planning, University College, London, Fellow of the British Academy and a member of the Academia Europaea; Doreen Massey, Professor of Geography, Faculty of Social Sciences, Open University and recipient of the Vautrin Lud International Geography Prize and the Victoria Medal of the Royal Geographical Society
19 November 1998	The Brain and Consciousness	Steven Rose, Professor of Biology and Director of the Brain and Behaviour Research Group, Open University; Dan Robinson, Distinguished Research Professor, Georgetown University and visiting lecturer in Philosophy and Senior Member of Linacre College, Oxford
26 November 1998	Work in the 20th Century	Richard Sennett, visiting professor, London School of Economics and author of The Corrosion of Character – the Personal Consequences of Work in the New Capitalism; Theodore Zeldin, historian and Fellow of St Antony's College, Oxford; Melanie Phillips, columnist on The Sunday Times and currently working on a book about The Sex Change State
3 December 1998	History's relevance in the 20th century	Simon Schama, Old Dominion Professor of Humanities, Columbia University in New York and currently filming a 16-part series for BBC Television on the history of Britain; Lady Antonia Fraser, historian, writer and author of biographies of Mary Queen of Scots, Cromwell and Charles II
10 December 1998	Cultural rights in the 20th Century	Homi Bhabha, Professor in English Literature and Art, The University of Chicago, and Visiting Professor of the Humanities, University College London; John N. Gray, Professor of European Thought, London School of Economics
17 December 1998	The American Century	Harry Evans, former editor of The Sunday Times and author of The American Century; John Lloyd, associate editor of the New Statesman and former Times correspondent in Moscow and East European Editor of the Financial Times
24 December 1998	Neuroscience in the 20th Century	Susan Greenfield, director of the Royal Institution, Professor of Pharmacology, Oxford University and Professor of Physics at Gresham College; Vilayanur S. Ramachandran, Professor of Neuroscience and Psychology, Director of the Brain Perception Laboratory, University of California, San Diego and Professor at the Salk Institute
31 December 1998	The British Empire's Legacy	Catherine Hall, Professor of Modern British Social and Cultural History, University College, London; Linda Colley, currently holder of the Leverhulme Research Professorship at the London School of Economics and former Professor of History, Yale University
7 January 1999	Feminism	Helena Cronin, Co-director of the Centre for the Philosophy of the Natural and Social Sciences, London School of Economics; Germaine Greer, Professor of English and Comparative Studies, Warwick University
14 January 1999	Genetic Engineering	Grahame Bulfield, geneticist, honorary professor, Edinburgh University and Director of the Roslin Institute, Edinburgh; Bryan Appleyard, features writer for The Sunday Times and author of Brave New Worlds: Genetics and the Human Experience
21 January 1999	Modern Culture	Will Self, writer and novelist; Roger Scruton, novelist, philosopher and former Professor at Birkbeck College, London
28 January 1999	Ageing	Alan Walker, social gerontologist, advisor to the UN's programme on Ageing and has chaired the European Commission's observatory on Ageing and Older People; Tom Kirkwood, Britain's first professor of Biological Gerontology, University of Manchester and president of the British Society for Research into Ageing
4 February 1999	Psychoanalysis and its Legacy	Juliet Mitchell, psychoanalyst, Fellow of Jesus College, Cambridge, Department of Political and Social Sciences; Adam Phillips, psychoanalyst and author of The Beast in the Nursery
11 February 1999	Language and the Mind	Jonathan Miller, medical doctor, performer, broadcaster, author and film and opera director; Steven Pinker, cognitive scientist, Professor of Psychology and Director of the Centre for Neuroscience, Massachusetts Institute of Technology
18 February 1999	Space in Religion and Science	John Polkinghorne, Fellow of Queens' College, Cambridge and Canon Theologian of Liverpool Cathedral; Margaret Wertheim, science writer and author of The Pearly Gates of Cyberspace: A History of Space from Dante to the Internet
25 February 1999	The Avant Garde's Decline and Fall in the 20th Century	Eric Hobsbawm, eminent historian and author of Behind The Times: The Decline and Fall of the Twentieth Century Avant-Gardes; Frances Morris, specialist in contemporary art and Art Programme Curator for the Tate Gallery of Modern Art
4 March 1999	Shakespeare and Literary Criticism	Harold Bloom, literary critic, Professor of Humanities, Yale University and Berg Professor of English, New York University; Jacqueline Rose, literary critic and Professor of English, University of London
11 March 1999	History as Science	Jared Diamond, ecologist and physiologist at the Los Angeles Medical School, University of California, and author of Guns, Germs and Steel; Richard J. Evans, Professor of Modern History, Cambridge University
18 March 1999	Animal Experiments and Rights	Colin Blakemore, Professor of Physiology, Oxford University, president of the British Association for the Advancement of Science, Fellow of the Royal Society and targeted in the 1980s by animal welfare activists protesting at his research methods; Lynda Birke, biologist, teacher at Lancaster and Warwick Universities, and previously worked for seven years in animal behaviour at the Open University
25 March 1999	Architecture in the 20th Century	Daniel Libeskind, architect of the Jewish Museum in Berlin and the Spiral Extension to London's Victoria and Albert Museum; Richard Weston, architect and lecturer at De Montfort University
1 April 1999	Good and Evil	Leszek Kołakowski, author and Professor of Philosophy, Oxford University; Galen Strawson, author and Fellow and Tutor in Philosophy, Jesus College, Oxford
8 April 1999	Writing and Political Oppression	Nadine Gordimer, Nobel Prize-winning South African novelist; Ariel Dorfman, Chilean journalist, scholar and author of Death and the Maiden
15 April 1999	Evolution	John Maynard Smith, evolutionary biological theorist and Emeritus Professor of Biology at the University of Sussex; Colin Tudge, writer, journalist and research fellow at the Centre for Philosophy
22 April 1999	Fundamentalism	Karen Armstrong, writer on the history of religious ideas and author of A History of God: From Abraham to the Present; Tariq Ali, film-maker, writer and author of The Book of Saladin
29 April 1999	Artificial Intelligence	Igor Aleksander, professor, Imperial College London and inventor of Magnus – a neural computer which he says is an artificially conscious machine; John Searle, Professor of Philosophy, University of California and one of only two people in the world to invent an argument, the Chinese Room Argument, which destroys the plausibility of the idea of conscious machines
6 May 1999	Mathematics	Ian Stewart, Professor of Mathematics and Gresham Professor of Geometry, University of Warwick; Brian Butterworth, Professor of Cognitive Neuroscience, University College, London
13 May 1999	Multiculturalism	Stuart Hall, former Professor of Sociology, Open University and currently on a Commission set up by the Runnymede Trust looking at the future of multi-ethnic Britain; Avtar Brah, Senior Lecturer in Sociology, Birkbeck College, London University
20 May 1999	The Universe's Origins	Martin Rees, Astronomer Royal and Royal Society Research Professor in Astronomy and Physics, Cambridge University; Paul Davies, theoretical physicist and Visiting Professor at Imperial College, London
27 May 1999	Memory and Culture	Malcolm Bowie, Marshall Foch Professor of French Literature at Oxford University and Director of Oxford's European Humanities Research Centre; Nancy Wood, Chair of Media Studies, University of Sussex and author of Vectors of Memory
3 June 1999	Just War	John Keane, Professor of Politics, University of Westminster and Director of the Centre for the Study of Democracy; Niall Ferguson, Fellow and Tutor in Modern History, Jesus College, Oxford and author of The Pity of War
10 June 1999	The Monarchy	David Cannadine, Director of the Institute of Historical Research, London and former Lecturer in History and Fellow, Christ's College, Cambridge; Bea Campbell, sociologist, journalist and author of Diana, Princess of Wales
17 June 1999	The Great Disruption	Francis Fukuyama, Hirst Professor of Public Policy, George Mason University, Washington, D.C., and author of The Great Disruption: Human Nature and the Reconstitution of Social Order; Amos Oz, author and Professor of Hebrew Literature, Ben-Gurion University, Beer-Sheva
24 June 1999	Capitalism	Anatole Kaletsky, economics commentator and Associate Editor of The Times, and author of The Costs of Default and In the Shadow of Debt; Edward Luttwak, Senior Fellow at the Center for Strategic and International Studies, Washington, D.C. and author of Turbo Capitalism: Winners and Losers in the Global Economy
1 July 1999	Intelligence	Ken Richardson, educational psychologist, former Senior Lecturer, Open University and author of The Making of Intelligence; Michael Ruse, Philosopher of Biology, University of Guelph, Ontario and author of Mystery of Mysteries: Is Evolution a Social Construction?
8 July 1999	Africa	Henry Louis Gates Jr, Chair of the Afro-American Studies Department, Harvard University and presenter of the BBC 2 series Into Africa; Anthony Sampson, writer, journalist and author of Mandela: The Authorised Biography
15 July 1999	Truth, Lies and fiction	Elena Lappin, novelist and author of an investigative essay published in Granta called "Truth and Lies", where she questions the veracity of the account of the Holocaust in the book Fragments by Binjamin Wilkomirski; Nick Groom, lecturer in English, University of Exeter
22 July 1999	Pain	Patrick Wall, Professor of Physiology at St Thomas' Hospital, London and author of Pain: The Science of Suffering; Semir Zeki, Professor of Neurobiology at University College, London

=== 1999–2000 ===
From 6 April 2000, with the discussion on "The Natural Order", the programme moved from 30 minutes to a 45-minute format.

Broadcast date Listen again	Title	Contributors and positions held at time of broadcast
23 September 1999	Genetic Determinism	Steve Jones, Professor of Genetics, University College London and author of Almost Like a Whale: The Origin of Species Updated; Matt Ridley, science journalist, chairman of the International Centre for Life and author of Genome: The autobiography of a species in 23 chapters
30 September 1999	Maths and Storytelling	John Allen Paulos, Presidential Scholar of Mathematics, Temple University, Philadelphia and author of Once Upon a Number – The hidden mathematical logic of stories; Marina Warner, novelist, historian, critic, former Reith Lecturer and Visiting Professor at Birkbeck College, London
7 October 1999	Utopia	A. C. Grayling, human rights campaigner, lecturer in philosophy at Birkbeck College, London and Fellow of St Anne's College, Oxford; John Carey, distinguished critic, journalist, broadcaster, Merton Professor of English, Oxford University and editor of the Faber Book of Utopias
14 October 1999	The Nation State	Norman Davies, Emeritus Professor, London University and author of The Isles: A History; Andrew Marr, former editor of The Independent and author of Ruling Britannia: the Failure and Future of British Democracy
21 October 1999	The Individual	Richard Wollheim, Professor of Philosophy, University of California, Berkeley; Jonathan Dollimore, Professor of English, University of York
28 October 1999	Atrocity in the 20th Century	Jonathan Glover, philosopher and Director of the Centre of Medical Law and Ethics, King's College London; Gwen Adshead, consultant psychiatrist, Broadmoor Special Hospital
4 November 1999	Education	Mary Warnock, philosopher and educationalist; Ted Wragg, Professor of Education, University of Exeter
11 November 1999	The Novel	D. J. Taylor, novelist, critic, biographer of Thackeray and author of After the War; Gillian Beer, King Edward VII Professor of English Literature, Cambridge University and Chairman of the Booker Prize judges 1997
18 November 1999	Progress	Anthony O'Hear, Professor of Philosophy, University of Bradford; Adam Phillips, psychoanalyst and author of Darwin's Worms
25 November 1999	Consciousness	Ted Honderich, philosopher and former Grote Professor of the Philosophy of Mind and Logic, University College London; Roger Penrose, physicist, mathematician and author of The Large, the Small and the Human Mind
2 December 1999	Tragedy	George Steiner, critic, Extraordinary Fellow, Churchill College, Cambridge and author of The Death of Tragedy; Catherine Belsey, Chair of the Centre for Critical and Cultural Theory, University of Cardiff and author of The Subject of Tragedy
9 December 1999	Childhood	Christina Hardyment, social historian and author of The Future of the Family; Theodore Zeldin, Senior Fellow, St Antony's College, Oxford and author of An Intimate History of Humanity
16 December 1999	Medical Ethics	Barry Jackson, consultant surgeon and president of the Royal College of Surgeons of England; Sheila McLean, Director of the Institute of Law and Ethics in Medicine, Glasgow University
23 December 1999	Prayer	Russell Stannard, physicist, religious writer and author of The God Experiment; Andrew Samuels, Jungian analyst and Professor of Analytical Psychology, University of Essex
30 December 1999	Time	Neil Johnson, theoretical physicist at the Clarendon Laboratory, Oxford University and Royal Institution Christmas Lecturer 1999 on the subject of Time; Lee Smolin, cosmologist and Professor of Physics, Pennsylvania State University
6 January 2000	Climate change	John Houghton, Co-Chair of the Inter-Governmental Panel on Climate Change – the United Nations' global warming science committee; George Monbiot, environmentalist, journalist and Visiting Professor, Department of Philosophy, Bristol University
13 January 2000	Information Technology	Charles Leadbeater, Demos Research Associate and author of Living on Thin Air: The New Economy; Ian Angell, Professor of Information Systems, London School of Economics and author of The New Barbarian Manifesto: How to Survive the Information Age
20 January 2000	Masculinity in Literature	Martin Amis, author of Money, Success and The Information; Cora Kaplan, feminist cultural critic and Professor of English, Southampton University
27 January 2000	Economic Rights	Amartya Sen, Master of Trinity College, Cambridge and winner of the 1998 Nobel Prize in Economic Science; Will Hutton, former Editor of The Observer, Director of The Industrial Society and author of The State We're In
3 February 2000	Republicanism	Sarah Barber, lecturer in the Department of History, Lancaster University and author of Regicide and Republicanism: Politics and Ethics in the English Revolution 1646–1659; Andrew Roberts, historian, journalist, conservative thinker and author of Salisbury: Victorian Titan
10 February 2000	Goethe and the Science of the Enlightenment	Nicholas Boyle, Reader in German Literary and Intellectual History, Magdalene College, Cambridge, and biographer of Goethe; Simon Schaffer, Reader in the History and Philosophy of Science, Cambridge University and Fellow of Darwin College, Cambridge
17 February 2000	Reading	Kevin Sharpe, Professor of History, University of Southampton; Jacqueline Pearson, Professor of English Literature, Manchester University
24 February 2000	Grand Unified Theory	Brian Greene, Professor of Physics and Mathematics, Columbia University and Cornell University; Martin Rees, Astronomer Royal and Royal Society Research Professor in Astronomy and Physics at Cambridge University
2 March 2000	Metamorphosis	A. S. Byatt, novelist and one of the contributors to Ovid Metamorphosed; Catherine Bates, critic and research fellow, University of Warwick
9 March 2000	The Age of Doubt	A. N. Wilson, novelist, biographer, journalist and author of God's Funeral; Victoria Glendinning, author, journalist and biographer of Anthony Trollope and Jonathan Swift
16 March 2000	Lenin	Robert Service, lecturer in Russian History and Fellow of St Antony's College, Oxford and biographer of Lenin; Vitali Vitaliev, author, columnist, broadcaster and former Soviet Journalist of the Year
23 March 2000	Materialism and the Consumer	Rachel Bowlby, Professor of English, University of York and author of Carried Away: The Invention of Modern Shopping; William Gibson, science fiction writer and author of Neuromancer and All Tomorrow's Parties
30 March 2000	History and Understanding the Past	Richard J. Evans, Professor of Modern History, University of Cambridge; Eric Hobsbawm, historian and author of The New Century
6 April 2000	The Natural Order	Colin Tudge, writer, scientist and author of The Variety of Life: A Survey and a Celebration of all the Creatures that Have Ever Lived; Sandy Knapp, Research Botanist, Department of Botany, Natural History Museum, London; Henry Gee, Senior Editor of Nature and author of Deep Time: Cladistics, the Revolution in Evolution
13 April 2000	New Wars	Michael Howard, Emeritus Professor of Modern History, Oxford University; Mary Kaldor, Director of the Programme on Global Civil Society, London School of Economics; Michael Rose, General, former Commander of the United Nations Protection Force in Bosnia and author of Fighting for Peace: Lessons from Bosnia
20 April 2000	Englishness	Paul Langford, Professor of Modern History, University of Oxford; Peter Mandler, Professor of Modern History at London Guildhall University; Lola Young, Director of the National Museum and Archives of Black History and Culture
27 April 2000	Human Origins	Leslie Aiello, Professor of Biological Anthropology, University College London; Robert Foley, evolutionary ecologist, writer and lecturer in biological anthropology at Cambridge University; Mark Roberts, Field Archaeologist, Project Leader of Boxgrove excavation and the discoverer of Boxgrove Man
4 May 2000	Death	Jonathan Dollimore, Professor of English, University of York; Thomas Lynch, poet, essayist, funeral director and author of The Undertaking – Life Studies from the Dismal Trade; Marilyn Butler, Professor of English Literature and Rector of Exeter College, Oxford
11 May 2000	Shakespeare's Work	Frank Kermode, literary critic and author of Shakespeare's Language; Michael Bogdanov, theatre, television, opera and film director and a founder member of the English Shakespeare Company; Germaine Greer, Professor of English and Comparative Studies, Warwick University
18 May 2000	The Wars of the Roses	Helen Castor, Fellow and Director of Studies in History, Sidney Sussex College, Cambridge; Colin Richmond, Emeritus Professor of History, Keele University; Steven Gunn, Tudor historian and Fellow and Tutor in Modern History, Merton College, Oxford
25 May 2000	Chemical elements	Paul Strathern, former lecturer in philosophy and science, Kingston University and author of Mendeleyev's Dream: The Quest for the Elements; Mary Archer, Visiting Professor of Chemistry at Imperial College, London; John Murrell, Emeritus Professor of Chemistry, University of Sussex
1 June 2000	The American Ideal	Christopher Hitchens, writer, journalist and author of No One Left to Lie To: The Triangulations of William Jefferson Clinton; John Keane, Professor of Politics, University of Westminster and Director of the Centre for the Study of Democracy; Susan Sontag, cultural critics and essayists, and author of the novel In America
8 June 2000	The Renaissance	Francis Ames-Lewis, Professor of History of Art, Birkbeck College; Peter Burke, Professor of Cultural History and Fellow of Emmanuel College, Cambridge; Evelyn Welch, Reader in the History of Art, University of Sussex
15 June 2000	Inspiration and Genius	Arthur I. Miller, Professor of History and Philosophy of Science, Department of Science & Technology, University College London; Michael Howe, Professor of Psychology, Exeter University; Juliet Mitchell, psychoanalyst and lecturer at Cambridge University
22 June 2000	Biography	Richard Holmes, writer, biographer and the author of Sidetracks: Explorations of a Romantic Biographer; Nigel Hamilton, biographer, Director of the British Institute of Biography and Professor of Biography, De Montfort University; Amanda Foreman, biographer of Georgiana, Duchess of Devonshire
29 June 2000	Imagination and Consciousness	Gerald Edelman, Director of the Neurosciences Institute in California and winner of the Nobel Prize for Physiology or Medicine in 1972; Igor Aleksander, Professor of Neural Engineering Systems, Imperial College, London; Margaret Boden, Professor of Philosophy and Psychology, University of Sussex

=== 2000–2001 ===
Broadcast date Listen again	Title	Contributors and positions held at time of broadcast
28 September 2000	London	Peter Ackroyd, author of London: The Biography; Claire Tomalin, author and biographer of Samuel Pepys; Iain Sinclair poet, novelist and author of Liquid City and Lights Out for the Territory
5 October 2000	Hitler in History	Ian Kershaw, historian and biographer of Hitler; Niall Ferguson, fellow and tutor in Modern History at Jesus College, Oxford; Mary Fulbrook, Professor of German History at University College London
12 October 2000	The Romantics	Jonathan Bate, Professor of English, University of Liverpool; Rosemary Ashton, Professor of English, University College London; Nicholas Roe, Professor of English, University of St Andrews
19 October 2000	Laws of Nature	Mark Buchanan, physicist and author of Ubiquity; Frank Close, theoretical physicist and author of Lucifer's Legacy: The Meaning of Asymmetry; Nancy Cartwright, Professor of Philosophy, LSE
26 October 2000	The Tudor State	John Guy, Professor of Modern History, University of St Andrews; Christopher Haigh, Tutor of Modern History at Christ Church, Oxford; Christine Carpenter, Fellow in History at New Hall, Cambridge
2 November 2000	Evolutionary Psychology	Janet Radcliffe Richards, Reader in Bioethics, University College, London; Nicholas Humphrey, Professor of Psychology, New School for Social Research, New York; Steven Rose, Professor of Physic, Open University
9 November 2000	Psychoanalysis and Literature	Adam Phillips, author of Promises Promises: Essays on Psychoanalysis and Literature; Malcolm Bowie, Marshal Foch Professor of French Literature, Oxford University; Lisa Appignanesi, novelist and co-author of Freud's Women
16 November 2000	Nihilism	Rob Hopkins, Senior Lecturer in Philosophy, University of Birmingham; Raymond Tallis, doctor and philosopher; Catherine Belsey, University of Cardiff
4 January 2001	Gothic	Chris Baldick, Professor of English at Goldsmiths College, London and author of In Frankenstein's Shadow; A. N. Wilson, novelist, biographer, journalist and author of God's Funeral; Emma Clery, senior lecturer in the English Department at Sheffield Hallam University and author of The Rise of Supernatural Fiction
11 January 2001	Mathematics and Platonism	Ian Stewart, Professor of Mathematics and Gresham Professor of Geometry, University of Warwick; Margaret Wertheim, science writer, journalist and author of Pythagoras' Trousers; John D. Barrow, Professor of Applied Mathematics and Theoretical Physics, University of Cambridge
18 January 2001	The Enlightenment in Britain	Roy Porter, Professor in the Social History of Medicine, Wellcome Trust Centre of University College London; Linda Colley, Leverhulme Research Professor and School Professor of History, London School of Economics; Jeremy Black, Professor of History at Exeter University
25 January 2001	Science and Religion	Stephen Jay Gould, Alexander Agassiz Professor of Zoology and Professor of Geology, Harvard University; John Haldane, Professor of Philosophy, University of St Andrews and Stanton Lecturer in Divinity, Cambridge University; Hilary Rose, sociologist and Visiting Professor of Social Policy, Bradford University
1 February 2001	Imperial Science	Richard Drayton, Professor of History at the University of Virginia and author of Nature's Government: Science, Imperial Britain and the 'Improvement' of the World; Maria Misra, Lecturer in Modern History and fellow of Keble College, Oxford; Ziauddin Sardar, Professor of Science and Technology Policy, Middlesex University
8 February 2001	Humanism	Tony Davies, Professor and Head of the Department of English, University of Birmingham and author of Humanism; Lisa Jardine, Professor of Renaissance Studies, Queen Mary College, University of London and Honorary Fellow of King's College, Cambridge; Simon Goldhill, Reader in Greek Literature and Culture at King's College, Cambridge
15 February 2001	The Restoration	Mark Goldie, lecturer in History, Churchill College, University of Cambridge; Richard Ollard, author of The Image of the King: Charles I and Charles II; Clare Jackson, lecturer and Director of Studies in History, Trinity Hall, Cambridge
22 February 2001	Quantum Gravity	John Gribbin, Visiting Fellow in Astronomy, University of Sussex; Lee Smolin, Professor of Physics, Centre for Gravitational Physics and Geometry, Pennsylvania State University and Visiting Professor of Physics at Imperial College, London; Janna Levin, Advanced Fellow, Department of Applied Mathematics and Theoretical Physics, Cambridge University
1 March 2001	Money	Niall Ferguson, Professor of Political and Financial History at the University of Oxford; Richard J. Evans, Professor of Modern History at the University of Cambridge; Jane Humphries, reader in Economic History at Oxford University
15 March 2001	Shakespeare's Life	Katherine Duncan-Jones, Professor of English at Somerville College, Oxford; John Sutherland, Professor of Modern English at University College, London and textual scholar; Grace Ioppolo, lecturer in English at the University of Reading
22 March 2001	Fossils	Richard Corfield, Research Associate in the Department of Earth Sciences at Oxford University; Dianne Edwards, Distinguished Research Professor in Palaeobotany at Cardiff University; Richard Fortey, Senior Research Palaeontologist at the Natural History Museum
29 March 2001	The Philosophy of Love	Roger Scruton, author of many books including Sexual Desire; Angie Hobbs, lecturer in philosophy at Warwick University; Thomas Docherty, Professor of English at the University of Kent
5 April 2001	The Roman Empire's Collapse in the 5th century	Charlotte Roueché, historian of late antiquity at King's College London; David Womersley, Fellow and Tutor at Jesus College, Oxford and editor of Edward Gibbon's The History of the Decline and Fall of the Roman Empire; Richard Alston, Lecturer in Classics at Royal Holloway, University of London
12 April 2001	Black Holes	Martin Rees, Astronomer Royal, Professor of Physics and Astronomy at Cambridge University; Jocelyn Bell Burnell, Professor of Physics at The Open University; Martin Ward, director of the X-Ray Astronomy Group at the University of Leicester
19 April 2001	The Glorious Revolution	John Spurr, Reader in History at the University of Wales, Swansea; Rosemary Sweet, Lecturer in Economic and Social History at the University of Leicester; Scott Mandelbrote, Fellow and Director of Studies at Peterhouse, Cambridge
26 April 2001	Literary Modernism	John Carey, Merton Professor of English Literature at Oxford University; Laura Marcus, Reader in English at the University of Sussex; Valentine Cunningham, Professor of English Language and Literature at the University of Oxford
3 May 2001	Evil	Jones Erwin, Lecturer in Philosophy at the University of Limerick; Stephen Mulhall, Tutor in Philosophy at New College, Oxford University; Margaret Atkins, Lecturer in Theology at Trinity and All Saints College, University of Leeds
14 June 2001	The French Revolution's Legacy	Stefan Collini, Professor of Intellectual History and English Literature at Cambridge University; Anne Janowitz, Professor of Romantic Poetry at Queen Mary College, London; Andrew Roberts, nineteenth century historian
21 June 2001	The Sonnet	Frank Kermode, author of many books including Shakespeare's Language; Phillis Levin, Poet in Residence and Professor of English at Hofstra University; Jonathan Bate, King Alfred Professor of English at the University of Liverpool
28 June 2001	Existentialism	A. C. Grayling, Reader in Philosophy at Birkbeck College, University of London; Christina Howells, Professor of French at the University of Oxford, fellow of Wadham College; Simon Critchley, Professor of Philosophy at the University of Essex and author of A Companion to Continental Philosophy
5 July 2001	The Earth's Origins	Simon Winchester, author of The Map That Changed the World: the Tale of William Smith and the Birth of A Science; Cherry Lewis, geologist and author of The Dating Game: One Man's Search for the Age of the Earth; John Cosgrove, Structural Geologist from the Royal School of Mines at Imperial College, London
12 July 2001	Dickens	Rosemary Ashton, Professor of English at University College London; Michael Slater, Professor of Victorian Literature at Birkbeck College, University of London and editor of The Dent Uniform Edition of Dickens' Journalism; John Bowen, Senior Lecturer in English at the University of Keele
19 July 2001	Byzantium	Charlotte Roueché, Reader in Classical and Byzantine Greek, King's College London; John Julius Norwich, author of a three-part history of Byzantium: The Early Centuries, The Apogee and Decline and Fall; Liz James, Senior Lecturer in the History of Art, University of Sussex

=== 2001–2002 ===
Broadcast date Listen again	Title	Contributors and positions held at time of broadcast
18 October 2001	Democracy	Melissa Lane, University Lecturer in the History of Political Thought; David Wootton, Professor of Intellectual History at Queen Mary College, London; Tim Winter, Assistant Muslim Chaplain at Cambridge University where he is lecturer in Islamic Studies
25 October 2001	Napoleon and Wellington	Andrew Roberts, military historian; Mike Broers, University of Aberdeen; Belinda Beaton, Department of History of Art at Oxford University
1 November 2001	Confucius	Frances Wood, Curator of the Chinese section of the British Library; Tim Barrett, Professor of East Asian History at SOAS, the School of African and Oriental Studies at London University; Tao Tao Liu, Tutorial Fellow in Oriental Studies at Wadham College, Oxford University
8 November 2001	The British Empire	Maria Misra, Lecturer in Modern History and Fellow of Keble College, Oxford; Peter Cain, Research Professor in History at Sheffield Hallam University; Catherine Hall, Professor of Modern Social and Cultural History at University College London
15 November 2001	Surrealism	Dawn Adès, Professor of Art History and Theory at the University of Essex; Malcolm Bowie, Marshal Foch Professor of French Literature at Oxford University and a fellow of All Souls College; Darian Leader, psychoanalyst
22 November 2001	Oceanography	Margaret Deacon, visiting research fellow at Southampton Oceanography Centre and author of Scientists and the Sea; Tony Rice, biological oceanographer and author of Deep Ocean; Simon Schaffer, Reader in History and Philosophy of Science at the University of Cambridge, and a fellow of Darwin College
29 November 2001	Third Crusade	Jonathan Riley-Smith, Dixie Professor of Ecclesiastical History at Cambridge University and author of many books on the Crusades; Carole Hillenbrand, Professor of Islamic History at the University of Edinburgh; Tariq Ali, novelist, playwright and author of The Book of Saladin
6 December 2001	Oscar Wilde	Valentine Cunningham, Professor of English Language and Literature at Oxford University; Regenia Gagnier, Professor of English at the University of Exeter; Neil Sammells, Dean of Humanities at Bath Spa University and author of Wilde Style
13 December 2001	Genetics	Steve Jones, Professor of Genetics and Head of the Galton Laboratory at University College London; Richard Dawkins, genetic scientist, Charles Simonyi Professor of the Public Understanding of Science at Oxford University; Linda Partridge, Natural Environment Research Council Research Professor at the Galton Laboratory, University College London
20 December 2001	Rome and European Civilization	Mary Beard, Reader in Classics at Cambridge University; Catharine Edwards, Lecturer in Classics and Ancient History at Birkbeck College, London University; Greg Woolf, Professor of Ancient History at St Andrews University
27 December 2001	Food	Rebecca Spang, Lecturer in Modern History at University College London; Ivan Day, food historian; Felipe Fernández-Armesto, Professor of Modern History at Oxford University
3 January 2002	Sensibility	Claire Tomalin, literary biographer and author of Jane Austen: A Life and The Life and Death of Mary Wollstonecraft; John Mullan, Senior Lecturer in English at University College London; Hermione Lee, Goldsmiths Professor of English Literature, University of Oxford
10 January 2002	Nuclear Physics	Jim Al-Khalili, Senior Lecturer in Physics at the University of Surrey; Christine Sutton, Particle Physicist and Lecturer in Physics at St Catherine's College, Oxford; John Gribbin, Visiting Fellow in Astronomy at the University of Sussex
17 January 2002	Catharism	Malcolm Barber, Professor of Medieval History at the University of Reading; Miri Rubin, Professor of Medieval History at Queen Mary, University of London; Euan Cameron, Professor of Modern History at the University of Newcastle Upon Tyne
24 January 2002	Happiness	Angie Hobbs, Lecturer in Philosophy at the University of Warwick; Simon Blackburn, Professor of Philosophy at Cambridge University; A. C. Grayling, Reader in Philosophy at Birkbeck College, University of London
31 January 2002	Yeats and Mysticism	Roy Foster, Carroll Professor of Irish History at Oxford University; Warwick Gould, Director of the Institute of English Studies, University of London; Brenda Maddox, author of George's Ghosts: A New Life of W B Yeats
7 February 2002	The Universe's Shape	Martin Rees, Royal Society Research Professor in Astronomy and Physics, Cambridge University; Julian Barbour, Independent Theoretical Physicist; Janna Levin, Advanced Fellow in Theoretical Physics at the University of Cambridge
14 February 2002	Anatomy	Harold Ellis, Clinical Anatomist, School of Biomedical Sciences, King's College London; Ruth Richardson, historian and author of Death, Dissection and the Destitute, Phoenix Press; Andrew Cunningham, Wellcome Trust Senior Research Fellow in the History of Medicine, Department of History and Philosophy of Science, Cambridge University
21 February 2002	The Celts	Barry Cunliffe, Professor of European Archaeology at Oxford University; Alistair Moffat, Historian and author of The Sea Kingdoms – The Story of Celtic Britain and Ireland; Miranda Aldhouse Green, Professor of Archaeology at the University of Wales
28 February 2002	Virtue	Galen Strawson, Professor of Philosophy at the University of Reading; Miranda Fricker, Lecturer in Philosophy at Birkbeck, University of London; Roger Crisp, Uehiro Fellow and Tutor in Philosophy at St Anne's College, Oxford
7 March 2002	Milton	John Carey, Emeritus Professor of English Literature at Oxford University; Lisa Jardine, Professor of Renaissance Studies at Queen Mary College, University of London and Honorary Fellow of King's College, Cambridge; Blair Worden, Professor of Early Modern History at the University of Sussex
14 March 2002	The Buddha	Peter Harvey, Professor of Buddhist Studies at the University of Sunderland; Kate Crosby, Lecturer in Buddhist Studies, SOAS; Mahinda Deegalle, Lecturer in the Study of Religions, Bath Spa University College and a Buddhist Monk from the Theravada tradition in Sri Lanka
21 March 2002	Marriage	Janet Soskice, Reader in Modern Theology and Philosophical Theology, Cambridge University; Frederik Pedersen, Lecturer in History, Aberdeen University; Christina Hardyment, Social historian and journalist
28 March 2002	The Artist	Emma Barker, Lecturer in Art History, The Open University; Thomas Healy, Professor of Renaissance Studies at Birkbeck University of London; Tim Blanning, Professor of Modern European History at the University of Cambridge
4 April 2002	Extra Terrestrials	Simon Goodwin, Researcher in Astronomy, Cardiff University; Heather Couper, Space expert; Ian Stewart, Professor of Mathematics, Warwick University
11 April 2002	Bohemia	Norman Davies, Professor Emeritus, University of London; Karin Friedrich, Lecturer in History, School of Slavonic and East European Studies, University College London; Robert Pynsent, Professor of Czech and Slovak Literature, University College London
25 April 2002	Tolstoy	A. N. Wilson, novelist, journalist and biographer of Tolstoy; Catriona Kelly, Reader in Russian, Oxford University; Sarah Hudspith, Lecturer in Russian, University of Leeds
2 May 2002	The Physics of Reality	Roger Penrose, Emeritus Rouse Ball Professor of Mathematics, Oxford University; Fay Dowker, Lecturer in Theoretical Physics, Queen Mary, University of London; Tony Sudbery, Professor of Mathematics, University of York
9 May 2002	The Examined Life	A. C. Grayling, Reader in Philosophy, Birkbeck, University of London; Janet Radcliffe Richards, Philosopher of Science and Reader in Bioethics, University College, London; Julian Baggini, editor, The Philosopher's Magazine and co-editor of New British Philosophy: The Interviews
16 May 2002	Chaos Theory	Susan Greenfield, senior research fellow, Lincoln College, Oxford; David Papineau, Professor of the Philosophy of Science, King's College London; Neil Johnson, University Lecturer in Physics at Oxford University
23 May 2002	Drugs	Richard Davenport-Hines, historian and author of The Pursuit of Oblivion: A Global History of Narcotics; Sadie Plant, author of Writing on Drugs; Mike Jay, historian and author of Emperors of Dreams: Drugs in the Nineteenth Century
30 May 2002	The Grand Tour	Chloe Chard, Literary historian; Jeremy Black, Professor of History, University of Exeter; Edward Chaney, Professor of Fine and Decorative Arts, Southampton Institute
6 June 2002	The Soul	Richard Sorabji, Gresham Professor of Rhetoric at Gresham College; Ruth Padel, poet and author; Martin Palmer, Theologian and Director of the International Consultancy on Religion, Education and Culture
13 June 2002	The American West	Frank McLynn, Visiting Professor in the Department of Literature, University of Strathclyde; Jenni Calder, author of There Must Be a Lone Ranger: The myth and reality of the American Wild West; Christopher Frayling, Rector of the Royal College of Art
20 June 2002	Wagner	John Deathridge, King Edward the Seventh Professor of Music, King's College London; Lucy Beckett, author of Richard Wagner: Parsifal; Michael Tanner, philosopher and author of Wagner and Nietzsche
27 June 2002	Cultural Imperialism	Linda Colley, School Professor of History, London School of Economics; Phillip Dodd, director, Institute of Contemporary Arts; Mary Beard, Reader in Classics, Cambridge University
4 July 2002	Freedom	John Keane, Professor of Politics, University of Westminster; Bernard Williams, Professor of Philosophy, University of California; Annabel Brett, Lecturer in History, University of Cambridge
11 July 2002	Psychoanalysis and democracy	Adam Phillips, general editor of the new Penguin translations of Freud; Sally Alexander, Professor of History, Goldsmiths College, University of London; Malcolm Bowie, Marshal Foch Professor of French Literature and Fellow, All Souls College, Oxford
18 July 2002	Heritage	David Cannadine, Director of the University of London's Institute of Historical Research; Miri Rubin, Professor of European History at Queen Mary, University of London; Peter Mandler, Fellow in History, Gonville and Caius College, Cambridge

=== 2002–2003 ===
Broadcast date Listen again	Title	Contributors and positions held at time of broadcast
17 October 2002	Slavery and Empire	Linda Colley, School Professor of History, LSE; Catherine Hall, Professor of Modern British Social and Cultural History, University College London; Felipe Fernández-Armesto, Professorial Research Fellow, Queen Mary College London
24 October 2002	The Scientist	John Gribbin, Visiting Fellow in Astronomy, University of Sussex; Patricia Fara, Lecturer on the History and Philosophy of Science, Cambridge University; Hugh Pennington, Head of the Department of Medical Microbiology, University of Aberdeen
31 October 2002	Architecture and Power	Adrian Tinniswood, Architectural historian; Gavin Stamp, Senior Lecturer, Mackintosh School of Architecture, Glasgow School of Art; Gillian Darley, Architectural historian and biographer of John Soane
7 November 2002	Human Nature	Steven Pinker, Professor of Psychology and Director of the Centre of Cognitive Neuroscience, Massachusetts Institute of Technology; Janet Radcliffe Richards, philosopher, Reader in Bioethics, University College London; John Gray, Professor of European Thought, London School of Economics
14 November 2002	Victorian Realism	Philip Davis, Reader in English Literature at the University of Liverpool and author of "The Victorians", a volume of the New Oxford English Literary History; A. N. Wilson, novelist, biographer and author of The Victorians; Dinah Birch, Fellow and tutor in English at Trinity College, Oxford
21 November 2002	Muslim Spain	Tim Winter, a convert to Islam and lecturer in Islamic Studies at the Faculty of Divinity at Cambridge University; Martin Palmer, Anglican lay preacher and theologian and author of The Sacred History of Britain; Mehri Niknam, executive director of the Maimonides Foundation, a joint Jewish-Muslim Interfaith Foundation in London
28 November 2002	Imagination	Susan Stuart, Lecturer in Philosophy of Mind at the University of Glasgow; Steven Mithen, Professor of Early Prehistory at the University of Reading; Semir Zeki, Professor of Neurobiology at the University of London and author of Inner Vision: An Exploration of Art and the Brain
5 December 2002	The Enlightenment in Scotland	Tom Devine, Professor and Director of the Research Institute of Irish and Scottish Studies at the University of Aberdeen; Karen O'Brien, Reader in English and American Literature at the University of Warwick; Alexander Broadie, Professor of Logic and Rhetoric at the University of Glasgow
12 December 2002	Man and Disease	Anne Hardy, Reader in the History of Medicine at the Wellcome Trust Centre at University College London; David Bradley, Professor of Tropical Hygiene at the London School of Hygiene and Tropical Medicine; Chris Dye, epidemiologist with the World Health Organisation
19 December 2002	The Calendar	Robert Poole, Reader in History at St Martin's College Lancaster and author of Time's Alteration, Calendar Reform in Early Modern England; Kristen Lippincott, Deputy Director of the National Maritime Museum in Greenwich; Peter Watson, Research Associate at the McDonald Institute for Archaeological Research at Cambridge University and author of A Terrible Beauty – A History of the People and Ideas that Shaped the Modern Mind
6 February 2003	The Epic	John Carey, Emeritus Professor of English Literature at Oxford University; Karen Edwards, Lecturer in English at Exeter University; Oliver Taplin, Professor of Classical Languages and Literature at the University of Oxford
13 February 2003	Chance and Design	Simon Conway Morris, Professor of Evolutionary Palaeobiology at Cambridge University and author of The Crucible of Creation – the Burgess Shale and the Rise of Animals; Sandy Knapp, botanist at the Natural History Museum; John Brooke, Andreas Idreos Professor of Science and Religion at Oxford University
20 February 2003	The Lindisfarne Gospels	Richard Gameson, Reader in Medieval History at Kent University and editor of St Augustine and the Conversion of England; Clare Lees, Professor of Medieval Literature at King's College London and author of Tradition and Belief: Religious Writing in Late Anglo-Saxon England; Michelle Brown, Curator of Illuminated Manuscripts at the British Library and author of A Guide to Western Historical Scripts
27 February 2003	The Aztecs	Alan Knight, Professor of the History of Latin America at Oxford University and author of Mexico: From the Beginning to the Spanish Conquest; Adrian Locke, co-curator of the Aztecs exhibition at the Royal Academy of Arts; Elizabeth Graham, Senior Lecturer in Mesoamerican Archaeology at University College London
6 March 2003	Meteorology	Vladimir Janković, Wellcome Research Lecturer at the Centre for the History of Science, Technology and Medicine at Manchester University; Richard Hamblyn, writer; Liba Taub, Director of the Whipple Museum of the History of Science at Cambridge University
13 March 2003	Redemption	Richard Harries, Bishop of Oxford; Janet Soskice, Reader in Modern Theology and Philosophical Theology at Cambridge University; Stephen Mulhall, Fellow and Tutor in Philosophy at Oxford University
20 March 2003	Originality	John Deathridge, King Edward Professor of Music at King's College London; Jonathan Rée, philosopher and author of Philosophical Tales; Catherine Belsey, Professor and Chair of the Centre for Critical and Cultural Theory at Cardiff University
27 March 2003	The Life of Stars	Paul Murdin, Senior Fellow at the Institute of Astronomy, Cambridge; Janna Levin, Advanced Fellow in Theoretical Physics in the Department of Applied Mathematics & Theoretical Physics at the University of Cambridge; Phil Charles, Professor of Astronomy at Southampton University
3 April 2003	The Spanish Civil War	Paul Preston, Principe de Asturias Professor of Contemporary Spanish History at the London School of Economics; Helen Graham, Professor of Spanish History at Royal Holloway, University of London; Mary Vincent, Senior Lecturer in the Department of History at the University of Sheffield
17 April 2003	Proust	Jacqueline Rose, Professor of English Literature at Queen Mary, University of London and author of Albertine; Malcolm Bowie, Master of Christ's College, Cambridge and author of Proust among the Stars; Robert Fraser, senior research fellow in the Literature Department at the Open University and author of Proust and the Victorians
24 April 2003	Youth	Tim Whitmarsh, Lecturer in Hellenistic Literature at Exeter University; Thomas Healy, Professor of Renaissance Studies at Birkbeck College, London; Deborah Thom, Lecturer in History at Robinson College, Cambridge
1 May 2003	Roman Britain	Greg Woolf, Professor of Ancient History at St Andrews University; Mary Beard, Reader in Classics at Cambridge University; Catharine Edwards, Lecturer in Classics and Ancient History at Birkbeck College, London University
8 May 2003	The Jacobite Rebellion	Murray Pittock, Professor of English Literature at the University of Strathclyde; Stana Nenadic, Senior Lecturer in Social History at Edinburgh University; Allan Macinnes, Burnett-Fletcher Professor of History at Aberdeen University
15 May 2003	The Holy Grail	Carolyne Larrington, Tutor in Medieval English at St John's College, Oxford; Jonathan Riley-Smith, Dixie Professor of Ecclesiastical History at Cambridge University; Juliette Wood, Associate Lecturer in the Department of Welsh at the University College of Wales in Cardiff
22 May 2003	Blood	Miri Rubin, Professor of European History at Queen Mary, University of London; Anne Hardy, Reader in the History of Medicine at the Wellcome Trust Centre for the History of Medicine at University College London; Jonathan Sawday, Professor of English Studies at the University of Strathclyde
29 May 2003	Memory	Martin Conway, Professor of Psychology at Durham University; Mike Kopelman, Professor of Neuropsychiatry at King's College London and St Thomas' Hospital; Kim Graham, Senior Scientist at the Medical Research Council's Cognition and Brain Sciences Unit
5 June 2003	The Lunar Society	Simon Schaffer, Reader in History and Philosophy of Science at the University of Cambridge; Jenny Uglow, Honorary Visiting Professor at the University of Warwick and author of The Lunar Men: The Friends who Made the Future; Peter Jones, Professor of French History at the University of Birmingham
12 June 2003	The Art of War	Michael Howard, Emeritus Professor of Modern History at the University of Oxford; Angie Hobbs, Lecturer in Philosophy at the University of Warwick; Jeremy Black, Professor of History at the University of Exeter
19 June 2003	The Aristocracy	David Cannadine, Director of the University of London's Institute of Historical Research and author of The Decline and Fall of the British Aristocracy; Rosemary Sweet, Lecturer in History at the University of Leicester; Felipe Fernández-Armesto, Professorial Research Fellow at Queen Mary, University of London
26 June 2003	The East India Company	Huw Bowen, Senior Lecturer in Economic and Social History at the University of Leicester; Linda Colley, School Professor of History at the London School of Economics; Maria Misra, Fellow and Tutor in Modern History at Keble College, Oxford
3 July 2003	Vulcanology	Hilary Downes, Professor of Geochemistry at Birkbeck, University of London; Steve Self, Professor of Vulcanology at the Open University; Bill McGuire, Benfield Professor of Geophysical Hazards at University College London
10 July 2003	Nature	Jonathan Bate, Professor of English Literature at the University of Warwick; Roger Scruton, Professor of Philosophy at the University of Buckingham; Karen Edwards, Lecturer in English at the University of Exeter
17 July 2003	The Apocalypse	Martin Palmer, theologian and Director of the International Consultancy on Religion, Education and Culture; Marina Benjamin, journalist and author of Living at the End of the World; Justin Champion, Reader in the History of Early Modern Ideas at Royal Holloway College, University of London

=== 2003–2004 ===
Broadcast date Listen again	Title	Contributors and positions held at time of broadcast
2 October 2003	Maxwell	Simon Schaffer, Reader in History and Philosophy of Science at the University of Cambridge; Peter Harman, Professor of the History of Science at Lancaster University and editor of The Scientific Letters and Papers of James Clerk Maxwell; Joanna Haigh, Professor of Atmospheric Physics at Imperial College London
9 October 2003	Bohemianism	Hermione Lee, Goldsmiths' Professor of English Literature at the University of Oxford and biographer of Virginia Woolf; Virginia Nicholson, author of Among the Bohemians: Experiments in Living 1900–1939; Graham Robb, writer and biographer of Balzac, Victor Hugo and Rimbaud
16 October 2003	The Schism	Henrietta Leyser, medieval historian and Fellow of St Peter's College, Oxford; Norman Housley, Professor of Medieval History at the University of Leicester; Jonathan Shepard, editor of The Cambridge History of the Byzantine Empire
23 October 2003	Infinity	Ian Stewart, Professor of Mathematics at the University of Warwick; Robert Kaplan, co-founder of The Math Circle at Harvard University and author of The Art of the Infinite: Our Lost Language of Numbers; Sarah Rees, Reader in Pure Mathematics at the University of Newcastle
30 October 2003	Robin Hood	Stephen Knight, Professor of English Literature at Cardiff University and author of Robin Hood: A Mythic Biography; Thomas Hahn, Professor of English Literature at the University of Rochester, New York; Juliette Wood, Secretary of the Folklore Society
6 November 2003	Sensation	John Mullan, Senior Lecturer in English at University College London; Lyn Pykett, Professor of English and Pro-Vice Chancellor at the University of Wales, Aberystwyth; Dinah Birch, Professor of English at the University of Liverpool
13 November 2003	Duty	Angie Hobbs, Lecturer in Philosophy at the University of Warwick; Annabel Brett, Fellow of Gonville and Caius College, Cambridge and Lecturer in History at the University of Cambridge; A. C. Grayling, Reader in Philosophy at Birkbeck, University of London
20 November 2003	Ageing the Earth	Richard Corfield, Research Associate in the Department of Earth Sciences at Oxford University; Hazel Rymer, Senior Lecturer in the Department of Earth Sciences at the Open University; Henry Gee, Senior Editor at Nature
27 November 2003	St Bartholomew's Day Massacre	Diarmaid MacCulloch, Professor of the History of the Church at Oxford University and author of a new book: Reformation: Europe's House Divided 1490–1700; Mark Greengrass, Professor of History at the University of Sheffield; Penny Roberts, Lecturer in History at the University of Warwick
4 December 2003	Wittgenstein	Ray Monk, Professor of Philosophy at the University of Southampton and author of Ludwig Wittgenstein: The Duty of Genius; Barry Smith, Lecturer in Philosophy at Birkbeck, University of London; Marie McGinn, Senior Lecturer in Philosophy at the University of York
11 December 2003	The Devil	Martin Palmer, theologian and Director of the International Consultancy on Religion, Education and Culture; Alison Rowlands, Senior Lecturer in European History at the University of Essex; David Wootton, Professor of Intellectual History at Queen Mary, University of London
18 December 2003	The Alphabet	Eleanor Robson, historian of Ancient Iraq and Fellow of All Souls College, Oxford; Alan Millard, Rankin Professor Emeritus of Hebrew and Ancient Semitic Languages at the University of Liverpool; Rosalind Thomas, Professor of Greek History at Royal Holloway, University of London
26 December 2003	Lamarck and Natural Selection	Sandy Knapp, Senior Botanist at the Natural History Museum; Steve Jones, Professor of Genetics in the Galton Laboratory at University College London and author of Almost Like a Whale: The Origin of Species Updated; Simon Conway Morris, Professor of Evolutionary Paleobiology at Cambridge University
29 January 2004	Cryptography	Simon Singh, science writer and author of The Code Book: The Secret History of Codes and Code-Breaking; Fred Piper, Professor and Director of the Information Security Group at Royal Holloway, University of London and co-author of Cryptography: A Very Short Introduction; Lisa Jardine, Professor of Renaissance Studies at Queen Mary, University of London and author of Ingenious Pursuits
5 February 2004	Thermopylae	Tom Holland, historian and author of Persian Fire; Simon Goldhill, Professor in Greek Literature and Culture at King's College, Cambridge; Edith Hall, Leverhulme Professor of Greek Cultural History at the University of Durham and author of Inventing the Barbarian: Greek Self-Definition through Tragedy
12 February 2004	The Sublime	Janet Todd, Professor of English Literature at the University of Glasgow; Annie Janowitz, Professor of Romantic Poetry at Queen Mary, University of London; Peter de Bolla, Lecturer in English at the University of Cambridge
19 February 2004	Rutherford	Simon Schaffer, Professor in the History and Philosophy of Science at the University of Cambridge; Jim Al-Khalili, Senior Lecturer in Physics at the University of Surrey; Patricia Fara, Fellow of Clare College, Cambridge
26 February 2004	The Mughal Empire	Sanjay Subrahmanyam, Professor of Indian History and Culture at the University of Oxford; Susan Stronge, Curator in the Asian Department of the Victoria and Albert Museum, London; Chandrika Kaul, Lecturer in Imperial History at the University of St Andrews
4 March 2004	Dreams	VS Ramachandran, Professor and Director of the Center for Brain and Cognition at the University of California, San Diego; Mark Solms, Professor of Neuropsychology at the University of Cape Town; Martin Conway, Professor of Psychology at the University of Durham
11 March 2004	The Norse Gods	Carolyne Larrington, Tutor in Medieval English at St John's College, Oxford; Heather O'Donoghue, Vigfusson Rausing Reader in Ancient Icelandic Literature in the Department of English at Oxford University; John Hines, Professor of Archaeology at Cardiff University
25 March 2004	Theories of Everything	Brian Greene, Professor of Physics and Mathematics at Columbia University and author of The Fabric of the Cosmos; John Barrow, Professor of Mathematical Sciences at the University of Cambridge and author of The Constants of Nature; Val Gibson, particle physicist from the Cavendish Laboratory and Fellow of Trinity College, Cambridge
1 April 2004	China's Warring States period	Chris Cullen, Director of the Needham Research Institute at Cambridge University; Vivienne Lo, Lecturer at the Wellcome Trust Centre for the History of Medicine; Carol Michaelson, Assistant Keeper of Chinese Art in the Department of Oriental Antiquities at the British Museum
8 April 2004	The Fall	Martin Palmer, theologian and Director of the International Consultancy on Religion, Education and Culture; Griselda Pollock, Professor of Art History at the University of Leeds; John Carey, Emeritus Professor of English Literature at Oxford University
15 April 2004	The Later Romantics	Jonathan Bate, Professor of English Literature at the University of Warwick; Robert Woof, Director of the Wordsworth Trust; Jennifer Wallace, Director of Studies in English at Peterhouse, Cambridge
22 April 2004	Hysteria	Juliet Mitchell, Professor of Psychoanalysis and Gender Studies at the University of Cambridge and author of Mad Men and Medusas: Reclaiming Hysteria and the Effects of Sibling Relations on the Human Condition; Rachel Bowlby, Professor of English at the University of York who has written the introduction to the latest Penguin translation of Sigmund Freud and Joseph Breuer's Studies in Hysteria; Brett Kahr, Senior Clinical Research Fellow in Psychotherapy and Mental Health at the Centre for Child Mental Health in London
29 April 2004	Tea	Huw Bowen, Senior Lecturer in Economic and Social History at the University of Leicester; James Walvin, Professor of History at the University of York; Amanda Vickery, Reader in History at Royal Holloway, University of London
6 May 2004	Heroism	Angie Hobbs, Lecturer in Philosophy at the University of Warwick and author of Plato and the Hero: Courage, Manliness and the Impersonal Good; A. C. Grayling, Reader in Philosophy at Birkbeck College, University of London; Paul Cartledge, Professor of Greek History at the University of Cambridge
13 May 2004	Zero	Robert Kaplan, co-founder of the Maths Circle at Harvard University and author of The Nothing That Is: A Natural History of Zero; Ian Stewart, Professor of Mathematics at the University of Warwick; Lisa Jardine, Professor of Renaissance Studies at Queen Mary, University of London
20 May 2004	Toleration	Justin Champion, Professor of the History of Early Modern Ideas at Royal Holloway, University of London; David Wootton, Professor of Intellectual History at Queen Mary, University of London; Sarah Barber, Senior Lecturer in History at Lancaster University
27 May 2004	The Planets	Paul Murdin, Senior Fellow at the Institute of Astronomy in Cambridge; Hugh Jones, planet hunter and Reader in Astrophysics at Liverpool John Moores University; Carolin Crawford, Royal Society Research Fellow at the Institute of Astronomy in Cambridge
3 June 2004	Babylon	Eleanor Robson, Lecturer in the History and Philosophy of Science at Cambridge University; Irving Finkel, Curator in the Department of the Ancient Near East at the British Museum; Andrew George, Professor of Babylonian at the School of Oriental and African Studies
10 June 2004	Empiricism	Judith Hawley, Senior Lecturer in English at Royal Holloway, University of London; Murray Pittock, Professor of Scottish and Romantic Literature at the University of Manchester; Jonathan Rée, philosopher and author of Philosophy and its Past
17 June 2004	Renaissance Magic	Peter Forshaw, Lecturer in Renaissance Philosophies at Birkbeck, University of London; Valery Rees, Renaissance historian and a translator of Ficino's letters; Jonathan Sawday, Professor of English Studies at the University of Strathclyde
24 June 2004	Washington and the American Revolution	Carol Berkin, Professor of History at The City University of New York; Simon Middleton, Lecturer in American History at the University of East Anglia; Colin Bonwick, Professor Emeritus in American History at Keele University

=== 2004–2005 ===
In 2005, listeners were invited to vote in a poll for the greatest philosopher in history. The winner was the subject of the final programme before the Summer break. The result of the vote was:

1. Karl Marx (with 27.9% of the votes)
2. David Hume (12.7%)
3. Ludwig Wittgenstein (6.8%)
4. Friedrich Nietzsche (6.5%)
5. Plato (5.6%)
6. Immanuel Kant (5.6%)
7. Thomas Aquinas (4.8%)
8. Socrates (4.8%)
9. Aristotle (4.5%)
10. Karl Popper (4.2%)

Broadcast date Listen again	Title	Contributors and positions held at time of broadcast
2 September 2004	Pi	Robert Lee Kaplan, co-founder of the Maths Circle at Harvard University; Eleanor Robson, Lecturer in the Department of History and Philosophy of Science at Cambridge University; Ian Stewart, Professor of Mathematics at the University of Warwick
9 September 2004	The Odyssey	Simon Goldhill, Professor of Greek at King's College, Cambridge; Edith Hall, Leverhulme Professor of Greek Cultural History at Durham University; Oliver Taplin, Classics Scholar and Translator at Oxford University
16 September 2004	Agincourt	Anne Curry, Professor of Medieval History at Southampton University; Michael Jones, medieval historian and writer; John Watts, Fellow and Tutor in Modern History at Corpus Christi College, Oxford
23 September 2004	The Origins of Life	Richard Dawkins, Charles Simonyi Professor of the Public Understanding of Science at Oxford University; Richard Corfield, Visiting Senior Lecturer at the Centre for Earth, Planetary, Space and Astronomical Research at the Open University; Linda Partridge, Biology and Biotechnology Research Council Professor at University College London
30 September 2004	Politeness	Amanda Vickery, Reader in History at Royal Holloway, University of London; David Wootton, Professor of History at the University of York; John Mullan, Senior Lecturer in English at University College London
7 October 2004	Sartre	Jonathan Rée, philosopher and historian; Benedict O'Donohoe, Principal Lecturer in French at the University of the West of England and Secretary of the UK Society for Sartrean Studies; Christina Howells, Professor of French at the University of Oxford and a Fellow of Wadham College
14 October 2004	The Han Synthesis	Christopher Cullen, Director of the Needham Research Institute; Carol Michaelson, Assistant Keeper of Chinese Art in the Department of Asia at the British Museum; Roel Sterckx, Lecturer in Chinese Studies at the University of Cambridge
21 October 2004	Witchcraft	Alison Rowlands, Senior Lecturer in European History at the University of Essex; Lyndal Roper, Fellow and Tutor in History at Balliol College, University of Oxford; Malcolm Gaskill, Fellow and Director of Studies in History at Churchill College, Cambridge
28 October 2004	Rhetoric	Angie Hobbs, Lecturer in Philosophy at the University of Warwick; Thomas Healy, Professor of Renaissance Studies at Birkbeck College, University of London; Ceri Sullivan, Senior Lecturer in English at the University of Wales, Bangor
4 November 2004	Electrickery	Simon Schaffer, Professor in History and Philosophy of Science at the University of Cambridge and a Fellow of Darwin College; Patricia Fara, historian of science and a Fellow of Clare College, Cambridge; Iwan Morus, Lecturer in the History of Science at Queen's University Belfast
11 November 2004	Zoroastrianism	Vesta Sarkhosh Curtis, Curator of Ancient Iranian Coins in the Department of Coins and Medals at the British Museum; Farrokh Vajifdar, Fellow of the Royal Asiatic Society; Alan Williams, Senior Lecturer in Comparative Religion at the University of Manchester
18 November 2004	Higgs Boson	Jim Al-Khalili, Senior Lecturer in Physics at the University of Surrey; David Wark, Professor of Experimental Physics at Imperial College London and the Rutherford Appleton Laboratory; Roger Cashmore, Professor and former Research Director at CERN and now Principal of Brasenose College, Oxford
25 November 2004	The Venerable Bede	Richard Gameson, Reader in Medieval History at the University of Kent at Canterbury; Sarah Foot, Professor of Early Medieval History at the University of Sheffield; Michelle Brown, manuscript specialist from the British Library
2 December 2004	Jung	Brett Kahr, Senior Clinical Research Fellow in Psychotherapy and Mental Health at the Centre for Child Mental Health in London and a practising Freudian; Ronald Hayman, writer and biographer of Jung; Andrew Samuels, Professor of Analytical Psychology at the University of Essex and a Jungian analyst in clinical practice
9 December 2004	Machiavelli and the Italian City States	Quentin Skinner, Regius Professor of History at the University of Cambridge; Evelyn Welch, Professor of Renaissance Studies at Queen Mary University of London; Lisa Jardine, Director of the Centre for Editing Lives and Letters at Queen Mary University of London
16 December 2004	The Second Law of Thermodynamics	John Gribbin, Visiting Fellow in Astronomy at the University of Sussex; Peter Atkins, Professor of Chemistry at Oxford University; Monica Grady, Head of Petrology and Meteoritics at the Natural History Museum
23 December 2004	Faust	Juliette Wood, Associate Lecturer in the Department of Welsh at the University College of Wales in Cardiff and Secretary of the Folklore Society; Osman Durrani, Professor of German at the University of Kent at Canterbury; Rosemary Ashton, Quain Professor of English Language and Literature at University College London
30 December 2004	The Roman Republic	Greg Woolf, Professor of Ancient History at St Andrews University; Catherine Steel, Lecturer in Classics at the University of Glasgow; Tom Holland, historian and author of Rubicon: the Triumph and Tragedy of the Roman Republic
6 January 2005	Tsar Alexander II's assassination	Orlando Figes, Professor of History at Birkbeck College, University of London; Dominic Lieven, Professor of Russian Government, London School of Economics; Catriona Kelly, Professor of Russian, Oxford University
13 January 2005	The Mind/Body Problem	A. C. Grayling, Reader in Philosophy at Birkbeck, University of London; Julian Baggini, editor of The Philosophers' Magazine; Sue James, Professor of Philosophy at Birkbeck, University of London
17 February 2005	The Cambrian Period	Simon Conway Morris, Professor of Evolutionary Palaeobiology, Cambridge University; Richard Corfield, Visiting Senior Lecturer at the Centre for Earth, Planetary, Space and Astronomical Research, Open University; Jane Francis, Professor of Palaeoclimatology, University of Leeds
24 February 2005	Alchemy	Peter Forshaw, Lecturer in Renaissance Philosophies at Birkbeck, University of London; Lauren Kassell, Lecturer in the History and Philosophy of Science at the University of Cambridge; Stephen Pumfrey, Senior Lecturer in the History of Science at the University of Lancaster
3 March 2005	Stoicism	Angie Hobbs, Lecturer in Philosophy, University of Warwick; Jonathan Rée, philosopher and historian; David Sedley, Laurence Professor of Ancient Philosophy, University of Cambridge
10 March 2005	Modernist Utopias	John Carey, Emeritus Professor of English Literature, Oxford University and editor of The Faber Book of Utopias; Steven Connor, Professor of Modern Literature at Birkbeck, University of London; Laura Marcus, Professor of English, University of Sussex
17 March 2005	Dark Energy	Martin Rees, Astronomer Royal and Professor of Cosmology and Astrophysics, Cambridge University; Carolin Crawford, Royal Society University Research Fellow at the Institute of Astronomy, University of Cambridge; Roger Penrose, Emeritus Rouse Ball Professor of Maths at Oxford University
24 March 2005	Angels	Martin Palmer, theologian and Director of the International Consultancy on Religion, Education and Culture; Valery Rees, Renaissance Scholar at the School of Economic Science; John Haldane, Professor of Philosophy, University of St Andrews
31 March 2005	John Ruskin	Dinah Birch, Professor of English, Liverpool University; Keith Hanley, Professor of English Literature and Director of the Ruskin Programme, Lancaster University; Stefan Collini, Professor of Intellectual History and English Literature, University of Cambridge
7 April 2005	Alfred and the Battle of Edington	Richard Gameson, Reader in Medieval History, University of Kent at Canterbury; Sarah Foot, Professor of Early Medieval History, University of Sheffield; John Hines, Professor in the School of History and Archaeology, Cardiff University
14 April 2005	Archaeology and Imperialism	Tim Champion, Professor of Archaeology, University of Southampton; Richard Parkinson, Assistant Keeper in the Department of Ancient Egypt and Sudan at the British Museum; Eleanor Robson, Lecturer in the History and Philosophy of Science at Cambridge University and a Fellow of All Souls College, Oxford
21 April 2005	The Aeneid	Edith Hall, Leverhulme Professor of Greek Cultural History, Durham University; Philip Hardie, Corpus Christi Professor of Latin at the University of Oxford; Catharine Edwards, Senior Lecturer in Classics and Ancient History, Birkbeck College University of London
28 April 2005	Perception and the Senses	Richard Gregory, senior research fellow in the Department of Experimental Psychology, Bristol University; David Moore, Director of the Medical Research Council Institute of Hearing Research, University of Nottingham; Gemma Calvert, Reader in Cognitive Neuroscience, University of Bath
5 May 2005	Abelard and Heloise	A. C. Grayling, Professor of Philosophy at Birkbeck College, University of London; Henrietta Leyser, Medieval Historian and Fellow of St Peter's College, Oxford; Michael Clanchy, Emeritus Professor of Medieval History at the Institute of Historical Research
19 May 2005	Beauty	Angie Hobbs, Lecturer in Philosophy at the University of Warwick; Susan James, Professor of Philosophy at Birkbeck College, University of London; Julian Baggini, Editor of The Philosophers' Magazine
26 May 2005	The French Revolution's Reign of Terror	Mike Broers, Lecturer in Modern History at the University of Oxford and Fellow of Lady Margaret Hall; Rebecca Spang, Lecturer in Modern History at University College London; Tim Blanning, Professor of Modern European History at the University of Cambridge
2 June 2005	Renaissance Maths	Robert Lee Kaplan, co-founder of the Maths Circle at Harvard University; Jim Bennett, Director of the Museum of the History of Science and Fellow of Linacre College, University of Oxford; Jackie Stedall, research fellow in the History of Mathematics, The Queen's College, Oxford
9 June 2005	The Scriblerus Club	John Mullan, Senior Lecturer in English, University College London; Judith Hawley, Senior Lecturer in English, Royal Holloway, University of London; Marcus Walsh, Kenneth Allott Professor of English Literature, University of Liverpool
16 June 2005	Paganism in the Renaissance	Thomas Healy, Professor of Renaissance Studies, Birkbeck College, University of London; Charles Hope, Director of the Warburg Institute and Professor of the History of the Classical Tradition, University of London; Evelyn Welch, Professor of Renaissance Studies at Queen Mary University of London
23 June 2005	The KT Boundary	Simon Kelley, Head of Department in the Department of Earth Sciences, Open University; Jane Francis, Professor of Palaeoclimatology, University of Leeds; Mike Benton, Professor of Vertebrate Palaeontology in the Department of Earth Sciences, University of Bristol
30 June 2005	Merlin	Juliette Wood, Associate Lecturer in the Department of Welsh at Cardiff University; Stephen Knight, Distinguished Research Professor in English Literature at Cardiff University; Peter Forshaw, Lecturer in Renaissance Philosophies at Birkbeck, University of London
7 July 2005	Marlowe	Katherine Duncan-Jones, senior research fellow in the English Faculty of Oxford University; Jonathan Bate, Professor of English Literature, University of Warwick; Emma Smith, Lecturer in English, Oxford University
14 July 2005	Marx	A. C. Grayling, Professor of Philosophy at Birkbeck College, University of London; Francis Wheen, journalist and author of a biography of Karl Marx; Gareth Stedman Jones, Professor of Political Science at Cambridge University

=== 2005–2006 ===
Broadcast date Listen again	Title	Contributors and positions held at time of broadcast
29 September 2005	Magnetism	Stephen Pumfrey, Senior Lecturer in the History of Science at the University of Lancaster; John Heilbron, Emeritus Professor of History at the University of California, Berkeley; Lisa Jardine, Professor of Renaissance Studies at Queen Mary University of London
6 October 2005	The Field of the Cloth of Gold	Steven Gunn, Lecturer in Modern History at Oxford University; John Guy, Fellow of Clare College, University of Cambridge; Penny Roberts, Senior Lecturer in History at the University of Warwick
13 October 2005	Mammals	Richard Corfield, Senior Lecturer in Earth Sciences at the Open University; Steve Jones, Professor of Genetics at University College London; Jane Francis, Professor of Palaeoclimatology at the University of Leeds
20 October 2005	Cynicism	Angie Hobbs, Lecturer in Philosophy, University of Warwick; Miriam Griffin, Fellow of Somerville College, Oxford; John Moles, Professor of Latin, University of Newcastle
27 October 2005	Johnson	John Mullan, Professor of English at University College London; Jim McLaverty, Professor of English at Keele University; Judith Hawley, Senior Lecturer in English at Royal Holloway, University of London
3 November 2005	Asteroids	Monica Grady, Professor of Planetary and Space Sciences, Open University; Carolin Crawford, Royal Society Research Fellow, University of Cambridge; John Zarnecki, Professor of Space Science, Open University
10 November 2005	Greyfriars and Blackfriars	Henrietta Leyser, medieval historian and Fellow of St Peter's College, Oxford; Alexander Murray, medieval historian and emeritus fellow of University College, Oxford; Anthony Kenny, philosopher and former Master of Balliol College, Oxford
17 November 2005	Pragmatism	A. C. Grayling, Professor of Applied Philosophy at Birkbeck College, University of London and a Fellow of St Anne's College, Oxford; Julian Baggini, editor of The Philosophers' Magazine; Miranda Fricker, Lecturer in Philosophy at Birkbeck College, University of London
24 November 2005	The Graviton	Roger Cashmore, Former Research Director at CERN and Principal of Brasenose College, Oxford; Jim Al-Khalili, Professor of Physics at the University of Surrey; Sheila Rowan, Reader in Physics in the Department of Physics and Astronomy at the University of Glasgow
1 December 2005	Hobbes	Quentin Skinner, Regius Professor of History at the University of Cambridge; David Wootton, Professor of History at the University of York; Annabel Brett, Senior Lecturer in Political Thought and Intellectual History at Cambridge University
8 December 2005	Artificial Intelligence	Jon Agar, Lecturer in the History and Philosophy of Science, University of Cambridge; Alison Adam, Professor of Information Systems, Salford University; Igor Aleksander, Professor of Neural Systems Engineering at Imperial College, University of London
15 December 2005	The Peterloo Massacre	Jeremy Black, Professor of History at the University of Exeter; Sarah Richardson, Senior Lecturer in History at the University of Warwick; Clive Emsley, Professor of History at the Open University
22 December 2005	Heaven	Valery Rees, Renaissance scholar and senior member of the Language Department at the School of Economic Science; Martin Palmer, Theologian and Director of the International Consultancy on Religion, Education and Culture; John Carey, Emeritus Professor of English Literature at Oxford University
29 December 2005	The Oresteia	Edith Hall, Professor of Greek Cultural History at Durham University; Simon Goldhill, Professor of Greek at the University of Cambridge; Tom Healy, Professor of Renaissance Studies at Birkbeck College, University of London
5 January 2006	The Oath	Alan Sommerstein, Professor of Greek at the University of Nottingham; Paul Cartledge, Professor of Greek History at the University of Cambridge; Mary Beard, Professor in Classics at the University of Cambridge
12 January 2006	Prime Numbers	Marcus du Sautoy, Professor of Mathematics and Fellow of Wadham College at the University of Oxford; Robin Wilson, Professor of Pure Mathematics at the Open University and Gresham Professor of Geometry; Jackie Stedall, Junior Research Fellow in the History of Mathematics at Queen's College, Oxford
19 January 2006	Relativism	Barry Smith, Senior Lecturer in Philosophy at Birkbeck College, University of London; Jonathan Rée, freelance philosopher who holds visiting professorships at the Royal College of Art and Roehampton University; Kathleen Lennon, Senior Lecturer in Philosophy at the University of Hull
26 January 2006	Seventeenth Century Print Culture	Kevin Sharpe, Professor of Renaissance Studies at Queen Mary University of London; Ann Hughes, Professor of Early Modern History at the University of Keele; Joad Raymond, Professor of English Literature at the University of East Anglia
2 February 2006	The Abbasid Caliphs	Hugh Kennedy, Professor of History at the University of St Andrews; Robert Irwin, Senior Research Associate at the School of Oriental and African Studies, University of London; Amira Bennison, Senior Lecturer in Middle Eastern and Islamic Studies at the University of Cambridge
9 February 2006	Chaucer	Carolyne Larrington, Tutor in Medieval English at St John's College, Oxford; Helen Cooper, Professor of Medieval and Renaissance English at the University of Cambridge; Ardis Butterfield, Reader in English at University College London
16 February 2006	Human Evolution	Steve Jones, Professor of Genetics in the Galton Laboratory at University College London; Fred Spoor, Professor of Evolutionary Anatomy at University College London; Margaret Clegg, Honorary Research Fellow in the Department of Biological Anthropology at University College London
23 February 2006	Catherine the Great	Janet Hartley, Professor of International History at the London School of Economics; Simon Dixon, Professor of Modern History at the University of Leeds; Antony Lentin, Professor of History at the Open University
2 March 2006	Friendship	Angie Hobbs, Lecturer in Philosophy at the University of Warwick; Mark Vernon, Visiting Lecturer in Philosophy at Syracuse University and London Metropolitan University; John Mullan, Professor of English at University College London
9 March 2006	Negative numbers	Ian Stewart, Professor of Mathematics at the University of Warwick; Colva Roney-Dougal, Lecturer in Pure Mathematics at the University of St Andrews; Raymond Flood, Lecturer in Computing Studies and Mathematics at Kellogg College, Oxford
16 March 2006	Don Quixote	Barry Ife, Cervantes Professor Emeritus at King's College London; Edwin Williamson, Professor of Spanish Studies at the University of Oxford; Jane Whetnall, Senior Lecturer in Hispanic Studies at Queen Mary University of London
23 March 2006	The Royal Society	Stephen Pumfrey, Senior Lecturer in the History of Science at the University of Lancaster; Lisa Jardine, Professor of Renaissance Studies at Queen Mary University of London; Michael Hunter, Professor of History at Birkbeck, University of London
30 March 2006	The Carolingian Renaissance	Matthew Innes, Professor of History at Birkbeck, University of London; Julia Smith, Edwards Professor of Medieval History at Glasgow University; Mary Garrison, Lecturer in History at the University of York
6 April 2006	Goethe	Tim Blanning, Professor of Modern European History at the University of Cambridge; Sarah Colvin, Professor of German at the University of Edinburgh; W. Daniel Wilson, Professor of German at Royal Holloway, University of London
13 April 2006	The Oxford Movement	Sheridan Gilley, Emeritus Reader in Theology at the University of Durham; Frances Knight, Senior Lecturer in Church History at the University of Wales, Lampeter; Simon Skinner, Fellow and Tutor in History at Balliol College, Oxford
20 April 2006	Immunisation	Nadja Durbach, associate professor of History at the University of Utah; Chris Dye, Co-ordinator of the World Health Organisation's work on tuberculosis epidemiology; Sanjoy Bhattacharya, Lecturer in the Wellcome Trust Centre for the History of Medicine at UCL
27 April 2006	The Great Exhibition of 1851	Jeremy Black, Professor of History at the University of Exeter; Hermione Hobhouse, Architectural Historian and writer; Clive Emsley, Professor of History at the Open University
4 May 2006	Astronomy and Empire	Simon Schaffer, Professor in History and Philosophy of Science at the University of Cambridge; Kristen Lippincott, former Director of the Royal Observatory, Greenwich; Allan Chapman, Historian of Science at the History Faculty at Oxford University
11 May 2006	Fairies	Juliette Wood, Associate Lecturer in the Department of Welsh at Cardiff University and Secretary of the Folklore Society; Diane Purkiss, Fellow and Tutor of English at Keble College, Oxford; Nicola Bown, Lecturer in Victorian Studies at Birkbeck, University of London
18 May 2006	Mill	A. C. Grayling, Professor of Philosophy at Birkbeck, University of London; Janet Radcliffe Richards, Reader in Bioethics at University College London; Alan Ryan, Professor of Politics at Oxford University
25 May 2006	Mathematics and Music	Marcus du Sautoy, Professor of Mathematics at the University of Oxford; Robin Wilson, Professor of Pure Mathematics at the Open University; Ruth Tatlow, Lecturer in Music Theory at the University of Stockholm
1 June 2006	The Heart	David Wootton, Anniversary Professor of History at the University of York; Fay Bound Alberti, research fellow at the Wellcome Unit for the History of Medicine at the University of Manchester; Jonathan Sawday, Professor of English Studies at the University of Strathclyde
8 June 2006	Uncle Tom's Cabin	Celeste-Marie Bernier, Lecturer in American Studies at the University of Nottingham; Sarah Meer, Lecturer and Director of Studies in English at Selwyn College, Cambridge; Clive Webb, Reader in American History at the University of Sussex
15 June 2006	Carbon	Harry Kroto, Professor of Chemistry at Florida State University; Monica Grady, Professor of Planetary and Space Sciences at the Open University; Ken Teo, Royal Academy of Engineering Research Fellow at Cambridge University
22 June 2006	The Spanish Inquisition	John Edwards, research fellow in Spanish at the University of Oxford; Alexander Murray, emeritus fellow in History at University College, Oxford; Michael Alpert, Emeritus Professor in Modern and Contemporary History of Spain at the University of Westminster
29 June 2006	Galaxies	John Gribbin, Visiting Fellow in Astronomy at the University of Sussex; Carolin Crawford, Royal Society University Research Fellow at the Institute of Astronomy at Cambridge; Robert Kennicutt, Plumian Professor of Astronomy and Experimental Philosophy at the University of Cambridge
6 July 2006	Pastoral Literature	Helen Cooper, Professor of Medieval and Renaissance English at the University of Cambridge; Laurence Lerner, former Professor of English at the University of Sussex; Julie Sanders, Professor of English Literature and Drama at the University of Nottingham
13 July 2006	Comedy in Ancient Greek Theatre	Paul Cartledge, Professor of Greek History at the University of Cambridge; Edith Hall, Professor of Drama and Classics at Royal Holloway, University of London; Nick Lowe, Senior Lecturer in Classics at Royal Holloway, University of London

=== 2006–2007 ===
Broadcast date Listen again	Title	Contributors and positions held at time of broadcast
28 September 2006	Humboldt	Jason Wilson, Professor of Latin American Literature at University College London; Patricia Fara, Affiliated Lecturer in the Department of History and Philosophy of Science at the University of Cambridge; Jim Secord, Professor in the Department of History and Philosophy of Science at the University of Cambridge and Director of the Darwin Correspondence Project
5 October 2006	Averroes	Amira Bennison, Senior Lecturer in Middle Eastern and Islamic Studies at the University of Cambridge; Peter Adamson, Reader in Philosophy at King's College London; Anthony Kenny, philosopher and former Master of Balliol College, Oxford
12 October 2006	The Diet of Worms	Diarmaid MacCulloch, Professor of the History of the Church at Oxford University; David Bagchi, Lecturer in the History of Christian Thought at the University of Hull; Charlotte Methuen, Lecturer in Reformation History at the University of Oxford
19 October 2006	The Needham Question	Chris Cullen, Director of the Needham Research Institute in Cambridge; Tim Barrett, Professor of East Asian History at SOAS; Frances Wood, Head of Chinese Collections at the British Library
26 October 2006	The Encyclopédie	Judith Hawley, Senior Lecturer in English at Royal Holloway, University of London; Caroline Warman, Fellow and Tutor in French at Jesus College, Oxford; David Wootton, Anniversary Professor of History at the University of York
2 November 2006	The Poincaré conjecture	June Barrow-Green, Lecturer in the History of Mathematics at the Open University; Ian Stewart, Professor of Mathematics at the University of Warwick; Marcus du Sautoy, Professor of Mathematics at the University of Oxford
9 November 2006	Pope	John Mullan, Professor of English at University College London; Jim McLaverty, Professor of English at Keele University; Valerie Rumbold, Reader in English Literature at Birmingham University
16 November 2006	The Peasants' Revolt	Miri Rubin, Professor of Early Modern History at Queen Mary, University of London; Caroline Barron, Professorial Research Fellow at Royal Holloway, University of London; Alastair Dunn, author of The Peasants' Revolt – England's Failed Revolution of 1381
23 November 2006	Altruism	Miranda Fricker, Senior Lecturer in the School of Philosophy at Birkbeck, University of London; Richard Dawkins, evolutionary biologist and the Charles Simonyi Professor of the Public Understanding of Science at Oxford University; John Dupré, Professor of Philosophy of Science at Exeter University and director of Egenis, the ESRC Centre for Genomics in Society
30 November 2006	The Speed of Light	John Barrow, Professor of Mathematical Sciences and Gresham Professor of Astronomy at Cambridge University; Iwan Morus, Senior Lecturer in the History of Science at The University of Wales, Aberystwyth; Jocelyn Bell Burnell, Visiting Professor of Astrophysics at Oxford University
7 December 2006	Anarchism	John Keane, Professor of Politics at University of Westminster; Ruth Kinna, Senior Lecturer in Politics at Loughborough University; Peter Marshall, philosopher and historian
14 December 2006	Indian Mathematics	George Gheverghese Joseph, Honorary Reader in Mathematics Education at Manchester University; Colva Roney-Dougal, Lecturer in Pure Mathematics at the University of St Andrews; Dennis Almeida, Lecturer in Mathematics Education at Exeter University and the Open University
21 December 2006	Hell	Martin Palmer, Director of the International Consultancy on Religion, Education and Culture; Margaret Kean, Tutor and Fellow in English at St Hilda's College, Oxford; Neil MacGregor, Director of the British Museum
28 December 2006	Constantinople Siege and Fall	Roger Crowley, author and historian; Judith Herrin, Professor of Late Antique and Byzantine Studies at King's College London; Colin Imber, formerly Reader in Turkish at Manchester University
4 January 2007	Jorge Luis Borges	Edwin Williamson, Professor of Spanish Studies at Oxford University; Efraín Kristal, Professor of Comparative Literature at University of California, Los Angeles; Evelyn Fishburn, Professor Emeritus at London Metropolitan University and Honorary Senior Research Fellow at University College London
11 January 2007	Mars	John Zarnecki, Professor of Space Science at the Open University and a team leader on the ExoMars mission; Colin Pillinger, Professor of Planetary Sciences at the Open University and leader of the Beagle 2 expedition to Mars; Monica Grady, Professor of Planetary and Space Sciences at the Open University and an expert on Martian meteorites
18 January 2007	The Jesuits	Nigel Aston, Reader in Early Modern History at the University of Leicester; Simon Ditchfield, Reader in History at the University of York; Dame Olwen Hufton, emeritus fellow of Merton College, Oxford
25 January 2007	Archimedes	Jackie Stedall, Junior Research Fellow in the History of Mathematics at Queen's College, Oxford; Serafina Cuomo, Reader in the History of Science at Imperial College London; George Phillips, Honorary Reader in Mathematics at St Andrews University
1 February 2007	Genghis Khan	Peter Jackson, Professor of Medieval History at Keele University; Naomi Standen, Lecturer in Chinese History at Newcastle University; George Lane, Lecturer in History at the School of Oriental and African Studies
8 February 2007	Popper	John Worrall, Professor of Philosophy of Science at the London School of Economics; Anthony O'Hear, Weston Professor of Philosophy at Buckingham University; Nancy Cartwright, Professor of Philosophy at the LSE and the University of California
15 February 2007	Heart of Darkness	Susan Jones, Fellow and Tutor in English at St Hilda's College, Oxford; Robert Hampson, Professor of Modern Literature at Royal Holloway, University of London; Laurence Davies, Honorary Senior Research Fellow in English at Glasgow University and Visiting Professor of Comparative Literature at Dartmouth College, New Hampshire
22 February 2007	Wilberforce	This programme was a documentary rather than a discussion. The programme can be streamed rather than downloaded.
1 March 2007	Optics	Simon Schaffer, Professor in History and Philosophy of Science at the University of Cambridge; Jim Bennett, Director of the Museum of the History of Science and Fellow of Linacre College at the University of Oxford; Emily Winterburn, Curator of Astronomy at the National Maritime Museum
8 March 2007	Microbiology	John Dupré, Professor of Philosophy of Science at Exeter University; Anne Glover, Professor of Molecular and Cell Biology at Aberdeen University; Andrew Mendelsohn, Senior Lecturer in the History of Science and Medicine at Imperial College, University of London
15 March 2007	Epistolary Literature	John Mullan, Professor of English at University College London; Karen O'Brien, Professor in English at the University of Warwick; Brean Hammond, Professor of Modern English Literature at the University of Nottingham
22 March 2007	Bismarck	Richard J. Evans, Professor of Modern History at the University of Cambridge; Christopher Clark, Reader in Modern European History at the University of Cambridge; Katharine Lerman, Senior Lecturer in Modern European History at London Metropolitan University
29 March 2007	Anaesthetics	David Wilkinson, Consultant Anaesthetist at St Bartholomew's Hospital in London and President of the History of Anaesthesia Society; Stephanie Snow, Research Associate at the Centre for the History of Science, Technology & Medicine at the University of Manchester; Anne Hardy, Professor in the History of Modern Medicine at University College London
5 April 2007	St Hilda	John Blair, Fellow in History at The Queen's College, Oxford; Rosemary Cramp, Emeritus Professor in Archaeology at Durham University; Sarah Foot, Professor of Early Medieval History at the University of Sheffield
12 April 2007	The Opium Wars	Yangwen Zheng, Lecturer in Modern Chinese History at the University of Manchester; Lars Laamann, research fellow in Chinese History at the School of Oriental and African Studies (SOAS), University of London; Xun Zhou, research fellow in History at SOAS, University of London
19 April 2007	Symmetry	Fay Dowker, Reader in Theoretical Physics at Imperial College, London; Marcus du Sautoy, Professor of Mathematics at the University of Oxford; Ian Stewart, Professor of Mathematics at the University of Warwick
26 April 2007	Greek and Roman Love Poetry	Nick Lowe, Senior Lecturer in Classics at Royal Holloway, University of London; Edith Hall, Professor of Classics and Drama at Royal Holloway, University of London; Maria Wyke, Professor of Latin at University College London
3 May 2007	Spinoza	Jonathan Rée, historian and philosopher and Visiting Professor at Roehampton University; Sarah Hutton, Professor of English at the University of Wales, Aberystwyth; John Cottingham, Professor of Philosophy at the University of Reading
10 May 2007	Victorian Pessimism	Dinah Birch, Professor of English at the University of Liverpool; Rosemary Ashton, Quain Professor of English Language and Literature at University College London; Peter Mandler, University Lecturer and Fellow in History at Gonville and Caius College, Cambridge
17 May 2007	Gravitational Waves	Jim Al-Khalili, Professor of Physics at the University of Surrey; Carolin Crawford, Royal Society Research Fellow at the Institute of Astronomy, Cambridge; Sheila Rowan, Professor in Experimental Physics in the Department of Physics and Astronomy at the University of Glasgow
24 May 2007	The Siege of Orléans	Anne Curry, Professor of Medieval History at the University of Southampton; Malcolm Vale, Fellow and Tutor in History at St John's College, Oxford; Matthew Bennett, Senior Lecturer at the Royal Military Academy, Sandhurst
31 May 2007	Ockham's Razor	Anthony Kenny, philosopher and former Master of Balliol College, Oxford; Marilyn Adams, Regius Professor of Divinity at Oxford University; Richard Alan Cross, Professor of Medieval Theology at Oriel College, Oxford
7 June 2007	Siegfried Sassoon	Jean Moorcroft Wilson, Lecturer in English at Birkbeck, University of London and a biographer of Sassoon; Fran Brearton, Reader in English and Assistant Director of the Seamus Heaney Centre for Poetry at the University of Belfast; Max Egremont, a biographer of Siegfried Sassoon
14 June 2007	Renaissance Astrology	Peter Forshaw, Lecturer in Renaissance Philosophies at Birkbeck, University of London; Lauren Kassell, Lecturer in the History and Philosophy of Science at the University of Cambridge; Jonathan Sawday, Professor of English Studies at the University of Strathclyde
21 June 2007	Common Sense Philosophy	A. C. Grayling, Professor of Philosophy at Birkbeck, University of London; Melissa Lane, Senior University Lecturer in History at Cambridge University; Alexander Broadie, Professor of Logic and Rhetoric at the University of Glasgow
28 June 2007	The Permian-Triassic Boundary	Richard Corfield, Senior Lecturer in Earth Sciences at the Open University; Mike Benton, Professor of Vertebrate Palaeontology in the Department of Earth Sciences at the University of Bristol; Jane Francis, Professor of Palaeoclimatology at the University of Leeds
5 July 2007	The Pilgrim Fathers	Kathleen Burk, Professor of Modern and Contemporary History at University College London; Harry Bennett, Reader in History and Head of Humanities at the University of Plymouth; Tim Lockley, associate professor of History at the University of Warwick
12 July 2007	Madame Bovary	Andy Martin, Lecturer in French at the University of Cambridge; Mary Orr, Professor of French at the University of Southampton; Robert Gildea, Professor of Modern History at the University of Oxford

=== 2007–2008 ===
Broadcast date Listen again	Title	Contributors and positions held at time of broadcast
27 September 2007	Socrates	Angie Hobbs, associate professor of Philosophy at Warwick University; David Sedley, Laurence Professor of Ancient Philosophy at Cambridge University; Paul Millett, Senior Lecturer in Classics at the University of Cambridge
4 October 2007	Antimatter	Val Gibson, Reader in High Energy Physics at the University of Cambridge; Frank Close, Professor of Physics at Exeter College, University of Oxford; Ruth Gregory, Professor of Mathematics and Physics at the University of Durham
11 October 2007	The Divine Right of Kings	Justin Champion, Professor of the History of Early Modern Ideas at Royal Holloway, University of London; Thomas Healy, Professor of Renaissance Studies at Birkbeck College, University of London; Clare Jackson, Lecturer and Director of Studies in History at Trinity Hall, Cambridge
18 October 2007	The Arabian Nights	Robert Graham Irwin, Senior Research Associate at the School of Oriental and African Studies, University of London; Marina Warner, Professor in the Department of Literature, Film and Theatre Studies at the University of Essex; Gerard van Gelder, Laudian Professor of Arabic at the University of Oxford
25 October 2007	Taste	Amanda Vickery, Reader in History at Royal Holloway, University of London; John Mullan, Professor of English at University College London; Jeremy Black, Professor of History at the University of Exeter
1 November 2007	Guilt	Stephen Mulhall, Fellow and Tutor in Philosophy at New College, Oxford; Miranda Fricker, Senior Lecturer in Philosophy at Birkbeck, University of London; Oliver Davies, Professor of Christian Doctrine at King's College London
8 November 2007	Avicenna	Peter Adamson, Reader in Philosophy at King's College London; Amira Bennison, Senior Lecturer in Middle Eastern and Islamic Studies at the University of Cambridge; Nader El-Bizri, Affiliated Lecturer in the History and Philosophy of Science at the University of Cambridge
15 November 2007	Oxygen	Simon Schaffer, Professor in History and Philosophy of Science at the University of Cambridge; Jenny Uglow, Honorary Visiting Professor at the University of Warwick; Hasok Chang, Reader in Philosophy of Science at University College London
22 November 2007	The Prelude	Rosemary Ashton, Quain Professor of English Language and Literature at University College London; Stephen Gill, University Professor of English Literature and Fellow of Lincoln College, Oxford; Emma Mason, Senior Lecturer in English at the University of Warwick
29 November 2007	The Fibonacci Sequence	Marcus du Sautoy, Professor of Mathematics at the University of Oxford; Jackie Stedall, Junior Research Fellow in History of Mathematics at Queen's College, Oxford; Ron Knott, Visiting Fellow in the Department of Mathematics at the University of Surrey
6 December 2007	Genetic Mutation	Steve Jones, Professor of Genetics in the Galton Laboratory, University College London; Adrian Woolfson, lectures in Medicine at Cambridge University; Linda Partridge, Weldon Professor of Biometry at University College London
13 December 2007	The Sassanid Empire	Hugh N. Kennedy, Professor of Arabic in the Faculty of Languages and Cultures at the School of Oriental and African Studies; Vesta Sarkhosh Curtis, Curator of Iranian and Islamic Coins in the British Museum; James Howard-Johnston, University Lecturer in Byzantine Studies at the University of Oxford
20 December 2007	The Four Humours	David Wootton, Anniversary Professor of History at the University of York; Vivian Nutton, Professor of the History of Medicine at University College London; Noga Arikha, Visiting Fellow at the Institut Jean-Nicod in Paris
27 December 2007	The Nicene Creed	Martin Palmer, Director of the International Consultancy on Religion, Education and Culture; Caroline Humfress, Reader in History at Birkbeck College, University of London; Andrew Louth, Professor of Patristic and Byzantine Studies at the University of Durham
3 January 2008	Camus	Peter Dunwoodie, Professor of French Literature at Goldsmiths, University of London; David Walker, Professor of French at the University of Sheffield; Christina Howells, Professor of French at Wadham College, University of Oxford
10 January 2008	The Charge of the Light Brigade	Mike Broers, Lecturer in Modern History at the University of Oxford and a Fellow of Lady Margaret Hall; Trudi Tate, Fellow of Clare Hall, Cambridge; Saul David, Visiting Professor of Military History at the University of Hull
17 January 2008	The Fisher King	Carolyne Larrington, Tutor in Medieval English at St John's College, Oxford; Stephen Knight, Distinguished Research Professor in English Literature at Cardiff University; Juliette Wood, Associate Lecturer in the Department of Welsh, Cardiff University and Director of the Folklore Society
24 January 2008	Plate Tectonics	Richard Corfield, Visiting Senior Lecturer in Earth Sciences at the Open University; Joe Cann, Senior Fellow in the School of Earth and Environment at the University of Leeds; Lynne Frostick, Director of the Hull Environment Research Institute and Professor of Physical Geography at the University of Hull
31 January 2008	Rudolph II	Peter Forshaw, Postdoctoral Fellow at Birkbeck, University of London and an Honorary Fellow of the University of Exeter; Howard Hotson, Lecturer in Modern History at the University of Oxford; Adam Mosley, Lecturer in the Department of History at the University of Wales, Swansea
7 February 2008	The Social Contract	Melissa Lane, Senior University Lecturer in History at Cambridge University; Susan James, Professor of Philosophy at Birkbeck College, University of London; Karen O'Brien, Professor of English Literature at the University of Warwick
14 February 2008	The Statue of Liberty	Robert Gildea, Professor of Modern History at Oxford University; Kathleen Burk, Professor of Modern Contemporary History at University College London; John Keane, Professor of Politics at the University of Westminster
21 February 2008	The Multiverse	Martin Rees, president of the Royal Society and Professor of Cosmology and Astrophysics at the University of Cambridge; Fay Dowker, Reader in Theoretical Physics at Imperial College; Bernard Carr, Professor of Mathematics and Astronomy at Queen Mary University of London
28 February 2008	Lear	Jonathan Bate, Professor of English Literature at the University of Warwick; Katherine Duncan-Jones, Tutorial Fellow in English at Somerville College, Oxford; Catherine Belsey, Research Professor in English at the University of Wales, Swansea
6 March 2008	Ada Lovelace	Patricia Fara, Senior Tutor at Clare College, Cambridge; Doron Swade, Visiting Professor in the History of Computing at Portsmouth University; John Fuegi, Visiting Professor in Biography at Kingston University
13 March 2008	The Greek Myths	Nick Lowe, Senior Lecturer in Classics at Royal Holloway, University of London; Richard Buxton, Professor of Greek Language and Literature at the University of Bristol; Mary Beard, Professor of Classics at Cambridge University
20 March 2008	Kierkegaard	Jonathan Rée, Visiting Professor at Roehampton University and the Royal College of Art; Clare Carlisle, Lecturer in Philosophy at the University of Liverpool; John Lippitt, Professor of Ethics and Philosophy of Religion at the University of Hertfordshire
27 March 2008	The Dissolution of the Monasteries	Diarmaid MacCulloch, Professor of the History of the Church at Oxford University; Diane Purkiss, Fellow and Tutor at Keble College, Oxford; George Bernard, Professor of Early Modern History at the University of Southampton
3 April 2008	The Laws of Motion	Simon Schaffer, Professor in History and Philosophy of Science at the University of Cambridge and Fellow of Darwin College; Raymond Flood, University Lecturer in Computing Studies and Mathematics and Senior Tutor at Kellogg College, Oxford; Rob Iliffe, Professor of Intellectual History and History of Science at the University of Sussex
10 April 2008	The Norman Yoke	Sarah Foot, Regius Professor of Ecclesiastical History at Christ Church, Oxford; Richard Gameson, Professor in the Department of History at Durham University; Matthew Strickland, Professor of Medieval History at the University of Glasgow
17 April 2008	Yeats and Irish Politics	Roy Foster, Carroll Professor of Irish History at Oxford University and Fellow of Hertford College, Oxford; Fran Brearton, Reader in English at Queen's University Belfast and Assistant Director of the Seamus Heaney Centre for Poetry for Poetry; Warwick Gould, Director of the Institute of English Studies in the School of Advanced Study, University of London
24 April 2008	Materialism	A. C. Grayling, Professor of Philosophy at Birkbeck College, University of London; Caroline Warman, Fellow of Jesus College, Oxford; Anthony O'Hear, Professor of Philosophy at the University of Buckingham
1 May 2008	The Enclosures of the 18th Century	Rosemary Sweet, Director of the Centre for Urban History at the University of Leicester; Murray Pittock, Bradley Professor of English Literature at the University of Glasgow; Mark Overton, Professor of Economic and Social History at the University of Exeter
8 May 2008	The Brain	Vivian Nutton, Professor of the History of Medicine at University College London; Jonathan Sawday, Professor of English Studies at the University of Strathclyde; Marina Wallace, Professor at the University of the Arts, London, Central St Martin's College of Art and Design
15 May 2008	The Library at Nineveh	Eleanor Robson, Senior Lecturer at Cambridge University and Vice-Chair of the British Institute for the Study of Iraq; Karen Radner, Lecturer in the Ancient Near Eastern History at University College London; Andrew R. George, Professor of Babylonian at the School of Oriental and African Studies at the University of London
22 May 2008	The Black Death	Miri Rubin, Professor of Medieval and Early Modern History at Queen Mary University of London; Samuel Cohn, Professor of Medieval History at the University of Glasgow; Paul Binski, Professor of the History of Medieval Art at Gonville and Caius College, Cambridge
29 May 2008	Probability	Marcus du Sautoy, Professor of Mathematics at the University of Oxford; Colva Roney-Dougal, Lecturer in Pure Mathematics at the University of St Andrews; Ian Stewart, Professor of Mathematics at the University of Warwick
5 June 2008	Lysenkoism	Robert Service, Professor of Russian History at the University of Oxford; Steve Jones, Professor of Genetics at University College London; Catherine Merridale, Professor of Contemporary History at Queen Mary University of London
12 June 2008	The Riddle of the Sands	Richard J. Evans, Professor of Modern History at the University of Cambridge; Rosemary Ashton, Quain Professor of English Language and Literature at University College London; T. C. W. Blanning, Professor of Modern European History at Cambridge University
19 June 2008	The Music of the Spheres	Peter Forshaw, Postdoctoral Fellow at Birkbeck, University of London; Jim Bennett, Director of the Museum of the History of Science at the University of Oxford; Angela Voss, Director of the Cultural Study of Cosmology and Divination at the University of Kent, Canterbury
26 June 2008	The Arab Conquests	Hugh N. Kennedy, Professor of Arabic at the School of Oriental and African Studies, University of London; Amira Bennison, Senior Lecturer in Middle Eastern and Islamic Studies at the University of Cambridge; Robert Hoyland, Professor in Arabic and Middle East Studies at the University of St Andrews
3 July 2008	The Metaphysical Poets	Thomas Healy, Professor of Renaissance Studies at Birkbeck College, University of London; Julie Sanders, Professor of English Literature and Drama at the University of Nottingham; Tom Cain, Professor of Early Modern Literature at the University of Newcastle
10 July 2008	Tacitus and the Decadence of Rome	Catharine Edwards, Professor of Classics and Ancient History at Birkbeck, University of London; Ellen O'Gorman, Senior Lecturer in Classics at the University of Bristol; Maria Wyke, Professor of Latin at University College London

=== 2008–2009 ===
Broadcast date Listen again	Title	Contributors and positions held at time of broadcast
25 September 2008	Miracles	Martin Palmer, Director of the International Consultancy on Religion, Education and Culture; Janet Soskice, Reader in Philosophical Theology at Cambridge University; Justin Champion, Professor of the History of Early Modern Ideas at Royal Holloway, University of London
2 October 2008	The Translation Movement	Peter Adamson, Reader in Philosophy at King's College London; Amira Bennison, Senior Lecturer in Middle Eastern and Islamic Studies at the University of Cambridge; Peter Pormann, Wellcome Trust Assistant Professor in Classics and Ancient History at the University of Warwick
9 October 2008	Gödel's Incompleteness Theorems	Marcus du Sautoy, Professor of Mathematics at Wadham College, University of Oxford; John D. Barrow, Professor of Mathematical Sciences at the University of Cambridge and Gresham Professor of Geometry; Philip Welch, Professor of Mathematical Logic at the University of Bristol
16 October 2008	Vitalism	Patricia Fara, Fellow of Clare College and Affiliated Lecturer in the Department of History and Philosophy of Science at Cambridge University; Andrew Mendelsohn, Senior Lecturer in the History of Science and Medicine at Imperial College, University of London; Pietro Corsi, Professor of the History of Science at the University of Oxford
23 October 2008	Dante's Inferno	Margaret Kean, University Lecturer in English and College Fellow at St Hilda's College, Oxford; John Took, Professor of Dante Studies at University College London; Claire Honess, Senior Lecturer in Italian at the University of Leeds and Co-Director of the Leeds Centre for Dante Studies
30 October 2008	Bolivar	Anthony McFarlane, Professor of Comparative American Studies at the University of Warwick; John Fisher, Professor of Latin American History at the University of Liverpool; Catherine Davies, Professor in the Department of Spanish, Portuguese and Latin American Studies at the University of Nottingham
6 November 2008	Aristotle's Politics	Angie Hobbs, associate professor of Philosophy at the University of Warwick; Paul Cartledge, AG Leventis Professor of Greek Culture at the University of Cambridge; Annabel Brett, Senior Lecturer in History at the University of Cambridge
13 November 2008	Neuroscience	Martin Conway, Professor of Psychology at the University of Leeds, Gemma Calvert, Professor of Applied Neuroimaging at WMG, University of Warwick; David Papineau, Professor of Philosophy of Science at King's College London
20 November 2008	The Baroque Movement	T. C. W. Blanning, Professor of Modern European History and Fellow of Sidney Sussex College, Cambridge; Nigel Aston, Reader in Early Modern History at the University of Leicester; Helen Hills, Professor of Art History at the University of York
27 November 2008	The Great Reform Act	Dinah Birch, Professor of English at Liverpool University; Michael Bentley, Professor of Modern History at the University of St Andrews; Catherine Hall, Professor of Modern British Social and Cultural History at University College London
4 December 2008	Heat	Simon Schaffer, Professor of History of Science at the University of Cambridge and Fellow of Darwin College; Hasok Chang, Professor of Philosophy of Science at University College London; Joanna Haigh, Professor of Atmospheric Physics at Imperial College London
11 December 2008	The Fire of London	Lisa Jardine, Centenary Professor of Renaissance Studies at Queen Mary, University of London; Vanessa Harding, Reader in London History at Birkbeck, University of London; Jonathan Sawday, Professor of English Studies at the University of Strathclyde
18 December 2008	The Physics of Time	Jim Al-Khalili, Professor of Theoretical Physics and Chair in the Public Engagement in Science at the University of Surrey; Monica Grady, Professor of Planetary and Space Sciences at the Open University; Ian Stewart, Professor of Mathematics at the University of Warwick
1 January 2009	The Consolations of Philosophy	A. C. Grayling, Professor of Philosophy at Birkbeck College, University of London; Melissa Lane, Senior University Lecturer in History at the University of Cambridge; Roger Scruton, Research Professor at the Institute for the Psychological Sciences
5 January 2009	Darwin: On the Origins of Charles Darwin	Jim Moore, Professor of the History of Science at The Open University; Steve Jones, Professor of Genetics at University College London; David Norman, Director of The Sedgwick Museum of Earth Sciences and Fellow of Christ's College, Cambridge; Colin Higgins, Assistant Librarian at Christ's College, Cambridge
6 January 2009	Darwin: The Voyage of the Beagle	Jim Moore, Professor of the History of Science at The Open University; Steve Jones, Professor of Genetics at University College London; David Norman, Director of The Sedgwick Museum of Earth Sciences and Fellow of Christ's College, Cambridge; Jenny Clack, Curator at The Cambridge University Museum of Zoology and Professor of Vertebrate Palaeontology at the University of Cambridge
7 January 2009	Darwin: On the Origin of Species	Jim Moore, Professor of the History of Science at The Open University; Steve Jones, Professor of Genetics at University College London; Jim Secord, the Darwin Correspondence Project; Johannes Vogel, Sandy Knapp and Judith Magee, all of the National History Museum
8 January 2009	Darwin: Life After Origins	Jim Moore, Professor of the History of Science at The Open University; Steve Jones, Professor of Genetics at University College London; Alison Pearn, the Darwin Correspondence Project; Nick Biddle, former garden curator at Down House
15 January 2009	Thoreau and the American Idyll	Kathleen Burk, Professor of American History at University College London; Tim Morris, Lecturer in American Literature at the University of Dundee; Stephen Fender, Honorary Professor in English Literature at University College London
22 January 2009	History of History	Paul Cartledge, AG Leventis Professor of Greek Culture and Fellow of Clare College, Cambridge; John Burrow, emeritus fellow of Balliol College, Oxford; Miri Rubin, Professor of Medieval and Early Modern History at Queen Mary, University of London
29 January 2009	Swift's A Modest Proposal	John Mullan, Professor of English at University College London; Judith Hawley, Professor of 18th Century Literature at Royal Holloway, University of London; Ian McBride, Senior Lecturer in the History Department at King's College London
5 February 2009	The Brothers Grimm	Juliette Wood, Associate Lecturer in Folklore at Cardiff University; Marina Warner, Professor in the Department of Literature, Film and Theatre Studies at the University of Essex; Tony Phelan, Professor in German at Keble College, Oxford
12 February 2009	Carthage's Destruction	Mary Beard, Professor of Classics at the University of Cambridge; Jo Quinn, Lecturer in Ancient History at the University of Oxford; Ellen O'Gorman, Senior Lecturer in Classics at the University of Bristol
19 February 2009	The Observatory at Jaipur	Chandrika Kaul, Lecturer in Modern History at the University of St Andrews; David Arnold, Professor of Asian and Global History at the University of Warwick; Chris Minkowski, Professor in Sanskrit at the University of Oxford
26 February 2009	The Waste Land and Modernity	Steve Connor, Professor of Modern Literature and Theory at Birkbeck College, University of London; Fran Brearton, Reader in English at Queen's University Belfast; Lawrence Rainey, Professor of English and American Literature at the University of York
5 March 2009	The Measurement problem in Physics	Basil Hiley, Emeritus Professor of Physics at Birkbeck, University of London; Simon Saunders, Reader in Philosophy of Physics and University Lecturer in Philosophy of Science at the University of Oxford; Roger Penrose, Emeritus Rouse Ball Professor of Mathematics at the University of Oxford
12 March 2009	The Library of Alexandria	Simon Goldhill, Professor of Greek at the University of Cambridge; Matthew Nicholls, Lecturer in Classics at the University of Reading; Serafina Cuomo, Reader in Roman History at Birkbeck College, University of London
19 March 2009	The Boxer Rebellion	Frances Wood, Curator of Chinese Collections at the British Library; Rana Mitter, Professor of the History and Politics of Modern China at the University of Oxford; R. G. Tiedemann, Senior Research Fellow at the Centre for the Study of Christianity in China
26 March 2009	The School of Athens	Angie Hobbs, associate professor in Philosophy at the University of Warwick; Valery Rees, Renaissance scholar and senior member of the Language Department at the School of Economic Science; Jill Kraye, Professor of the History of Renaissance Philosophy and Librarian at the Warburg Institute at the University of London
2 April 2009	Baconian Science	Stephen Pumfrey, Senior Lecturer in the History of Science at the University of Lancaster; Patricia Fara, Senior Tutor at Clare College, Cambridge; Rhodri Lewis, University Lecturer in English at the University of Oxford and Fellow of St Hugh's
9 April 2009	Aldous Huxley's Brave New World	David Bradshaw, Reader and Tutor in English Literature at Worcester College, Oxford; Daniel Pick, Professor of History at Birkbeck, University of London; Michèle Barrett, Professor of Modern Literary and Cultural Theory at Queen Mary, University of London
16 April 2009	Suffragism	Krista Cowman, Professor of History at the University of Lincoln; June Purvis, Professor of Women's & Gender History at the University of Portsmouth; Julia Bush, Senior Lecturer in History at the University of Northampton
23 April 2009	The Building of St Petersburg	Simon Dixon, Sir Bernard Pares Professor of Russian History at University College London; Janet Hartley, Professor of International History at the London School of Economics; Anthony Cross, Emeritus Professor of Slavonic Studies at the University of Cambridge
30 April 2009	The Vacuum of Space	Frank Close, Professor of Physics at Exeter College, Oxford; Jocelyn Bell Burnell, Visiting Professor in Astrophysics at Oxford University; Ruth Gregory, Professor of Theoretical Physics at Durham University
7 May 2009	The Magna Carta	Nicholas Vincent, Professor of Medieval History at the University of East Anglia; David Carpenter, Professor of Medieval History at King's College London; Michael Clanchy, Emeritus Professor of Medieval History at the Institute of Historical Research
14 May 2009	The Siege of Vienna	Jeremy Black, Professor of History at the University of Exeter; Andrew Wheatcroft, Professor of International Publishing at Stirling University; Claire Norton, Lecturer in History at St Mary's University, London
21 May 2009	The Whale - A History	Steve Jones, Professor of Genetics at University College London; Eleanor Weston, a mammalian palaeontologist at the Natural History Museum in London; Bill Amos, Professor of Evolutionary Genetics at Cambridge University
28 May 2009	St Paul	John Haldane, Professor of Philosophy at the University of St Andrews; John Barclay, Lightfoot Professor of Divinity at Durham University; Helen Bond, Senior Lecturer in the New Testament at the University of Edinburgh
4 June 2009	The Trial of Charles I	Justin Champion, Professor of the History of Early Modern Ideas at Royal Holloway, University of London; Diane Purkiss, Fellow and Tutor at Keble College, Oxford; David Wootton, Professor of History at the University of York
11 June 2009	The Augustan Age	Mary Beard, Professor of Classics at Cambridge University; Catharine Edwards, Professor of Classics and Ancient History at Birkbeck College, University of London; Duncan Kennedy, Professor of Latin Literature at the University of Bristol
18 June 2009	Elizabethan Revenge	Jonathan Bate, Professor of Shakespeare and Renaissance Literature at the University of Warwick; Julie Sanders, Professor of English Literature and Drama at the University of Nottingham; Janet Clare, Professor of Renaissance Literature at the University of Hull
25 June 2009	Sunni and Shia Islam	Amira Bennison, Senior Lecturer in Middle Eastern and Islamic Studies at the University of Cambridge; Robert Gleave, Professor of Arabic Studies at the University of Exeter; Hugh N. Kennedy, Professor of Arabic in the School of Oriental and African Studies at the University of London
2 July 2009	Logical Positivism	Barry Smith, Professor of Philosophy at the University of London; Nancy Cartwright, Professor of Philosophy at the London School of Economics; Thomas Uebel, Professor of Philosophy at the University of Manchester
9 July 2009	Ediacara Biota	Richard Corfield, Senior Lecturer in Earth Sciences at the Open University; Martin Brasier, Professor of Palaeobiology at the University of Oxford; Rachel Wood, Lecturer in Carbonate Geoscience at the University of Edinburgh

=== 2009–2010 ===
Broadcast date Listen again	Title	Contributors and positions held at time of broadcast
17 September 2009	St Thomas Aquinas	Martin Palmer, Director of the International Consultancy on Religion, Education and Culture; John Haldane, Professor of Philosophy at the University of St Andrews; Annabel Brett, Lecturer in History at Gonville and Caius College, Cambridge
24 September 2009	Calculus	Simon Schaffer, Professor of History of Science at the University of Cambridge and Fellow of Darwin College; Patricia Fara, Senior Tutor at Clare College, Cambridge; Jackie Stedall, Departmental Lecturer in History of Mathematics at the University of Oxford
1 October 2009	Akhenaten	Richard Parkinson, Egyptologist at the British Museum; Elizabeth Frood, Lecturer in Egyptology at the University of Oxford; Kate Spence, Lecturer in the Archaeology of Ancient Egypt at the University of Cambridge
8 October 2009	The Dreyfus Affair	Robert Gildea, Professor of Modern History at Oxford University; Robert Tombs, Professor of French History at Cambridge University; Ruth Harris, Lecturer in Modern History at Oxford University
15 October 2009	The Death of Elizabeth I	John Guy, Fellow of Clare College, University of Cambridge; Clare Jackson, Lecturer and Director of Studies in History at Trinity Hall, University of Cambridge; Helen Hackett, Reader in English at University College London
22 October 2009	The Geological Formation of Britain	Richard Corfield, Visiting Senior Research Fellow at Oxford University; Jane Francis, Professor of Palaeoclimatology, University of Leeds; Sanjeev Gupta, Royal Society-Leverhulme Trust Research Fellow at Imperial College London
29 October 2009	Schopenhauer	A. C. Grayling, Professor of Philosophy at Birkbeck College, University of London; Beatrice Han-Pile, Professor of Philosophy at the University of Essex; Christopher Janaway, Professor of Philosophy at the University of Southampton
5 November 2009	The Siege of Munster	Diarmaid MacCulloch, Professor of the History of the Church at the University of Oxford; Charlotte Methuen, University Research Lecturer in Ecclesiastical History at the University of Oxford and Lecturer in Church History and Liturgy at Ripon College Cuddesdon; Lucy Wooding, Lecturer in Early Modern History at King's College London
12 November 2009	Radiation	Jim Al-Khalili, Professor of Theoretical Physics and Chair in the Public Engagement in Science at the University of Surrey; Frank Close, Professor of Physics at Exeter College, University of Oxford; Frank James, Professor of the History of Science at the Royal Institution
19 November 2009	Sparta	Paul Cartledge, A G Leventis Professor of Greek Culture and a Fellow of Clare College, Cambridge; Edith Hall, Professor of Classics and Drama at Royal Holloway, University of London; Angie Hobbs, associate professor of Philosophy and Senior Fellow in the Public Understanding of Philosophy at the University of Warwick
26 November 2009	Joyce's A Portrait of the Artist as a Young Man	Roy Foster, Carroll Professor of Irish History and Fellow of Hertford College, Oxford; Katherine Mullin, Senior Lecturer in English Literature at the University of Leeds; Jeri Johnson, Senior Fellow in English at Exeter College, Oxford
3 December 2009	The Silk Road	Frances Wood, Head of the Chinese Section at the British Library; Tim Barrett, Professor of East Asian History at the School of Oriental and African Studies; Naomi Standen, Senior Lecturer in Chinese Studies at Newcastle University
10 December 2009	Pythagoras	Ian Stewart, Emeritus Professor of Mathematics at the University of Warwick; Serafina Cuomo, Reader in Roman History at Birkbeck College, University of London; John O'Connor, Senior Lecturer in Mathematics at the University of St Andrews
24 December 2009	The Samurai	Angus Lockyer, Lecturer in Japanese History and Chair of the Japan Research Centre at the School of Oriental and African Studies, University of London; Nicola Liscutin, Programme Director of Japanese Studies, Birkbeck College, University of London; Gregory Irvine, Senior Curator Japan at the Victoria and Albert Museum
31 December 2009	Mary Wollstonecraft	Karen O'Brien, Professor of English at the University of Warwick; John Mullan, Professor of English at University College London; Barbara Taylor, Professor of Modern History in the School of Humanities
4 January 2010	The Royal Society and British Science: Episode 1	Documentary format
5 January 2010	The Royal Society and British Science: Episode 2	Documentary format
6 January 2010	The Royal Society and British Science: Episode 3	Documentary format
7 January 2010	The Royal Society and British Science: Episode 4	Documentary format
14 January 2010	The Frankfurt School	Jonathan Rée, a freelance historian and philosopher, currently Visiting Professor at Roehampton University and at the Royal College of Art; Esther Leslie, Professor in Political Aesthetics at Birkbeck College, University of London; Raymond Geuss, Professor in the Faculty of Philosophy at the University of Cambridge
21 January 2010	The Glencoe Massacre	Murray Pittock, Bradley Professor of English Literature at the University of Glasgow; Karin Bowie, Lecturer in Scottish History at the University of Glasgow; Daniel Szechi, Professor of Early Modern History at the University of Manchester
28 January 2010	Silas Marner	Rosemary Ashton, Quain Professor of English Language and Literature at University College, London; Dinah Birch, Professor of English at Liverpool University; Valentine Cunningham, Professor of English Language and Literature at Corpus Christi, University of Oxford
4 February 2010	Ibn Khaldun	Robert Hoyland, Professor of Islamic History at the University of Oxford; Robert Graham Irwin, Senior Research Associate of the School of Oriental and African Studies at the University of London; Hugh N. Kennedy, is Professor of Arabic in the School of Oriental and African Studies at the University of London
11 February 2010	The Unintended Consequences of Mathematics	John D. Barrow, Professor of Mathematical Sciences at the University of Cambridge and Professor of Geometry at Gresham College, London; Colva Roney-Dougal, Lecturer in Pure Mathematics at the University of St Andrews; Marcus du Sautoy, Charles Simonyi Professor for the Public Understanding of Science and Professor of Mathematics at the University of Oxford
18 February 2010	The Indian Mutiny	Chandrika Kaul, Lecturer in Imperial and Indian History at the University of St Andrews; Faisal Devji, University Reader in Indian History at St Antony's College, University of Oxford; Shruti Kapila, University Lecturer in History and Fellow and Director of Studies at Corpus Christi College, Cambridge
25 February 2010	Calvinism	Justin Champion, Professor of the History of Early Modern Ideas at Royal Holloway, University of London; Susan Hardman Moore, Senior Lecturer in Divinity at the University of Edinburgh; Diarmaid MacCulloch, Professor of the History of the Church at the University of Oxford
4 March 2010	The Infant Brain	Usha Goswami, Professor of Education at the University of Cambridge and Director of its Centre for Neuroscience in Education; Annette Karmiloff-Smith, Professorial Research Fellow at the Centre for Brain and Cognitive Development at the Department of Psychological Sciences, Birkbeck College, University of London; Denis Mareschal, Professor of Psychology at the Centre for Brain and Cognitive Development at Birkbeck College, University of London
11 March 2010	Boudica	Juliette Wood, Associate Lecturer in Folklore at Cardiff University; Richard Hingley, Professor of Roman Archaeology at Durham University; Miranda Aldhouse-Green, Professor of Archaeology in the School of History and Archaeology at Cardiff University
18 March 2010	Munch and The Scream	David Jackson, Professor of Russian and Scandinavian Art Histories at the University of Leeds; Dorothy Rowe, Senior Lecturer in the History of Art at the University of Bristol; Alastair Wright, University Lecturer in the History of Art at St John's College, Oxford
25 March 2010	The City - a history, part 1	Peter Hall, Professor of Planning and Regeneration at The Bartlett School of Planning, University College London; Julia Merritt, associate professor of History at the University of Nottingham; Greg Woolf, Professor of Ancient History at the University of St Andrews
1 April 2010	The City - a history, part 2	Peter Hall, Professor of Planning and Regeneration at The Bartlett School of Planning, University College London; Tristram Hunt, lecturer in History at Queen Mary College at the University of London; Ricky Burdett, Professor of Urban Studies at the London School of Economics
8 April 2010	William Hazlitt	Jonathan Bate, Professor of English Literature at the University of Warwick; A. C. Grayling, Professor of Philosophy at Birkbeck College, University of London; Uttara Natarajan, Senior Lecturer in the Department of English and Comparative Literature at Goldsmiths College, University of London
15 April 2010	The Rise and Fall of the Zulu Nation	Saul David, Professor of War Studies at the University of Buckingham; Saul Dubow, Professor of History at the University of Sussex; Shula Marks, Emeritus Professor of History at the School of Oriental and African Studies, University of London
22 April 2010	Roman Satire	Mary Beard, Professor of Classics at Cambridge University; Denis Feeney, Professor of Classics and Giger Professor of Latin at Princeton University; Duncan Kennedy, Professor of Latin Literature and the Theory of Criticism at the University of Bristol
29 April 2010	The Great Wall of China	Julia Lovell, Lecturer in Chinese History at Birkbeck College, University of London; Rana Mitter, Professor of the History and Politics of Modern China at the University of Oxford; Frances Wood, Head of the Chinese Section at the British Library
6 May 2010	The Cool Universe	Carolin Crawford, Member of the Institute of Astronomy, and Fellow of Emmanuel College, at the University of Cambridge; Paul Murdin, Visiting Professor of Astronomy at Liverpool John Moores University's Astronomy Research Institute; Michael Rowan-Robinson, Professor of Astrophysics at Imperial College, London
13 May 2010	William James's The Varieties of Religious Experience	Jonathan Rée, Freelance philosopher; John Haldane, Professor of Philosophy at the University of St Andrews; Gwen Griffith-Dickson, Emeritus Professor of Divinity at Gresham College and Director of the Lokahi Foundation
20 May 2010	The Cavendish Family in Science	Jim Bennett, Director of the Museum of the History of Science at the University of Oxford; Patricia Fara, Senior Tutor of Clare College, University of Cambridge; Simon Schaffer, Professor of History of Science at the University of Cambridge and Fellow of Darwin College, Cambridge
27 May 2010	Giorgio Vasari's Lives of the Artists	Evelyn Welch, Professor of Renaissance Studies and Academic Dean for Arts at Queen Mary, University of London; David Ekserdjian, Professor of History of Art and Film at the University of Leicester; Martin Kemp, Emeritus Professor in the History of Art at the University of Oxford
3 June 2010	Edmund Burke	Karen O'Brien, Professor of English at the University of Warwick; Richard Bourke, Senior Lecturer in History at Queen Mary, University of London; John Keane, Professor of Politics at the University of Sydney
10 June 2010	Al-Biruni	James Montgomery, Professor of Classical Arabic at the University of Cambridge; Hugh Kennedy, Professor of Arabic in the School of Oriental and African Studies at the University of London; Amira Bennison, Senior Lecturer in Middle Eastern and Islamic Studies at the University of Cambridge
17 June 2010	The Neanderthals	Simon Conway Morris, Professor of Evolutionary Palaeobiology at the University of Cambridge; Chris Stringer, Research Leader in Human Origins at the Natural History Museum and Visiting Professor at Royal Holloway, University of London; Danielle Schreve, Reader in Physical Geography at Royal Holloway, University of London
24 June 2010	Antarctica	Jane Francis, Professor of Paleoclimatology at the University of Leeds; Julian Dowdeswell, Director of the Scott Polar Research Institute and Professor of Physical Geography at the University of Cambridge; David Walton, Emeritus Professor at the British Antarctic Survey and Visiting Professor at the University of Liverpool
1 July 2010	Athelstan	Sarah Foot, Regius Professor of Ecclesiastical History at Christ Church, Oxford; John Hines, Professor of Archaeology at Cardiff University; Richard Gameson, Professor of the History of the Book at Durham University
8 July 2010	Pliny's Natural History	Serafina Cuomo, Reader in Roman History at Birkbeck, University of London; Aude Doody, Lecturer in Classics at University College, Dublin; Liba Taub, Reader in the History and Philosophy of Science, Cambridge University

=== 2010–2011 ===
Broadcast date Listen again	Title	Contributors and positions held at time of broadcast
23 September 2010	Imaginary numbers	Marcus du Sautoy, Professor of Mathematics at Oxford University; Ian Stewart, Emeritus Professor of Mathematics at the University of Warwick; Caroline Series, Professor of Mathematics at the University of Warwick
30 September 2010	The Delphic Oracle	Paul Cartledge, A. G. Leventis Professor of Greek Culture at Cambridge University; Edith Hall, Professor of Classics at Royal Holloway, University of London; Nick Lowe, Reader in Classical Literature at Royal Holloway, University of London
7 October 2010	The Spanish Armada	Diane Purkiss, Fellow and Tutor at Keble College, Oxford; Maria Jose Rodriguez-Salgado, Professor in International History at the London School of Economics; Nicholas Rodger, senior research fellow at All Souls College, Oxford
14 October 2010	Sturm und Drang	T. C. W. Blanning, Emeritus Professor of Modern European History at Cambridge University; Susanne Kord, Professor of German at University College, London; Maike Oergel, associate professor of German at the University of Nottingham
21 October 2010	Logic	A. C. Grayling, Professor of Philosophy at Birkbeck, University of London; Peter Millican, Gilbert Ryle Fellow in Philosophy at Hertford College, Oxford; Rosanna Keefe, Senior Lecturer in Philosophy at the University of Sheffield
28 October 2010	The Unicorn	Juliette Wood, Associate Lecturer in Folklore at Cardiff University; Lauren Kassell, Lecturer in the History and philosophy of science at the University of Cambridge; David Ekserdjian, Professor of the History of Art and Film at the University of Leicester
4 November 2010	Women and Enlightenment Science	Patricia Fara, Senior Tutor at Clare College, Cambridge; Karen O'Brien, Professor of English at the University of Warwick; Judith Hawley, Professor of 18th Century Literature at Royal Holloway, University of London
11 November 2010	The Volga Vikings	James Montgomery, professor of Classical Arabic at the University of Cambridge; Neil Price, Professor of Archaeology at the University of Aberdeen; Elizabeth Ashman Rowe, Lecturer in Scandinavian History of the Viking Age at Clare Hall, Cambridge
18 November 2010	Foxe's Book of Martyrs	Diarmaid MacCulloch, Professor of Church history at the University of Oxford; Justin Champion, Professor of the History of Early Modern Ideas at Royal Holloway, University of London; Elizabeth Evenden, Lecturer in Book History at Brunel University
25 November 2010	History of Metaphor	Steven Connor, Professor of Modern Literature and Theory at Birkbeck, University of London; Tom Healy, Professor of Renaissance Studies at the University of Sussex; Julie Sanders, Professor of English Literature at the University of Nottingham
2 December 2010	Cleopatra	Catharine Edwards, Professor of Classics and Ancient History at Birkbeck, University of London; Maria Wyke, Professor of Latin at University College London; Susan Walker, Keeper of Antiquities at the Ashmolean Museum at the University of Oxford
9 December 2010	Thomas Edison	Simon Schaffer, Professor of the History of Science, University of Cambridge; Kathleen Burk, Professor of History, University College London; Iwan Morus, Reader in History, University of Aberystwyth
16 December 2010	Daoism	Tim Barrett, Professor of East Asian History at the School of Oriental and African Studies, University of London; Martin Palmer, Director of the International Consultancy on Religion, Education and Culture; Hilde de Weerdt, Fellow and Tutor in Chinese History at Pembroke College, University of Oxford
23 December 2010	The Industrial Revolution	Jeremy Black, Professor of History at the University of Exeter; Pat Hudson, Professor Emerita of History at Cardiff University; William Ashworth, Senior Lecturer in History at the University of Liverpool
30 December 2010	Consequences of the Industrial Revolution	Jane Humphries, Professor of Economic History and Fellow of All Souls College, University of Oxford; Emma Griffin, Senior Lecturer in History at the University of East Anglia; Lawrence Goldman, Fellow and Tutor in History at St Peter's College, University of Oxford
6 January 2011	Childe Harold's Pilgrimage	Jonathan Bate, Professor of English Literature at the University of Warwick; Jane Stabler, Reader in Romanticism at the University of St Andrews; Emily Bernhard Jackson, Assistant Professor in Nineteenth-Century English Literature at the University of Arkansas
13 January 2011	Random and Pseudorandom	Marcus du Sautoy, Professor of Mathematics at the University of Oxford; Colva Roney-Dougal, Senior Lecturer in Pure Mathematics at the University of St Andrews; Timothy Gowers, Royal Society Research Professor in Mathematics at the University of Cambridge
20 January 2011	The Mexican Revolution	Alan Knight, Professor of the History of Latin America at the University of Oxford; Paul Garner, Cowdray Professor of Spanish at the University of Leeds; Patience Schell, Senior Lecturer in Latin American Cultural Studies at the University of Manchester
27 January 2011	Aristotle's Poetics	Angie Hobbs, associate professor of Philosophy and Senior Fellow in the Public Understanding of Philosophy at the University of Warwick; Nick Lowe, Reader in Classical Literature at Royal Holloway, University of London; Stephen Halliwell, Professor of Greek at the University of St Andrews
3 February 2011	The Battle of Bannockburn	Matthew Strickland, Professor of Medieval History at the University of Glasgow; Fiona Watson, Honorary Research Fellow in History at the University of Dundee; Michael Brown, Reader in History at the University of St Andrews
10 February 2011	The Nervous System	Colin Blakemore, Professor of Neuroscience at the University of Oxford; Vivian Nutton, Emeritus Professor of the History of Medicine at University College, London; Tilli Tansey, Professor of the History of Modern Medical Sciences at Queen Mary, University of London
17 February 2011	Maimonides	John Joseph Haldane, Professor of Philosophy at the University of St Andrews; Sarah Stroumsa, Professor of Arabic Studies and currently Rector at the Hebrew University of Jerusalem; Peter Adamson, Professor of Ancient and Medieval Philosophy at King's College London
24 February 2011	The Taiping Rebellion	Rana Mitter, Professor of the History and Politics of Modern China at the University of Oxford; Frances Wood, Head of the Chinese Section at the British Library; Julia Lovell, Lecturer in Chinese History at Birkbeck, University of London
3 March 2011	The Age of the Universe	Martin Rees, Astronomer Royal and Emeritus Professor of Cosmology and Astrophysics at the University of Cambridge; Carolin Crawford, Member of the Institute of Astronomy and Fellow of Emmanuel College at the University of Cambridge; Carlos Frenk, Director of the Institute for Computational Cosmology at the University of Durham
10 March 2011	Free Will (500th programme)	Simon Blackburn, Bertrand Russell Professor of Philosophy at the University of Cambridge; Helen Beebee, Professor of Philosophy at the University of Birmingham; Galen Strawson, Professor of Philosophy at the University of Reading
17 March 2011	The Medieval University	Miri Rubin, Professor of Medieval and Early Modern History at Queen Mary, University of London; Ian Wei, Senior Lecturer in Medieval European History at the University of Bristol; Peter Denley, Reader in History at Queen Mary, University of London
24 March 2011	The Iron Age	Barry Cunliffe, Emeritus Professor of European Archaeology at the University of Oxford; Sue Hamilton, Professor of Prehistory at University College London; Timothy Champion, Professor of Archaeology at the University of Southampton
31 March 2011	The Bhagavad Gita	Chakravarthi Ram-Prasad, Professor of Comparative Religion and Philosophy at Lancaster University; Julius J. Lipner, Professor of Hinduism and the Comparative Study of Religion and Fellow of Clare Hall, Cambridge; Jessica Frazier, research fellow at the Oxford Centre for Hindu Studies and Lecturer in Religious Studies at Regent's College, London
7 April 2011	Octavia Hill	Dinah Birch, Professor of English Literature and Pro-Vice Chancellor for Research at Liverpool University; Lawrence Goldman, Fellow in Modern History at St Peter's College, Oxford; Gillian Darley, Historian and biographer of Octavia Hill
14 April 2011	The Neutrino	Frank Close, Professor of Physics at Exeter College at the University of Oxford; Susan Cartwright, Senior Lecturer in Particle Physics and Astrophysics at the University of Sheffield; David Wark, Professor of Particle Physics at Imperial College, London, and the Rutherford Appleton Laboratory
21 April 2011	The Pelagian Controversy	Martin Palmer, Director of the International Consultancy on Religion, Education, and Culture; Caroline Humfress, Reader in History at Birkbeck College, University of London; John Milbank, Professor in Religion, Politics and Ethics and the Director of the Centre for Theology and Philosophy at the University of Nottingham
28 April 2011	Cogito Ergo Sum	Susan James, Professor of Philosophy at Birkbeck College, University of London; John Cottingham, Professor Emeritus of Philosophy at the University of Reading and Professorial Research Fellow at Heythrop College, University of London; Stephen Mulhall, Professor of Philosophy at the University of Oxford
5 May 2011	Islamic Law and its Origins	Hugh Kennedy, Professor of Arabic in the School of Oriental and African Studies at the University of London; Robert Gleave, Professor of Arabic Studies at the University of Exeter; Mona Siddiqui, Professor of Islamic Studies at the University of Glasgow
12 May 2011	The Anatomy of Melancholy	Julie Sanders, Professor of English Literature and Drama at the University of Nottingham; Mary Ann Lund, Lecturer in English at the University of Leicester; Erin Sullivan, Lecturer and Fellow at the Shakespeare Institute at the University of Birmingham
19 May 2011	Custer's Last Stand	Kathleen Burk, Professor of Modern and Contemporary History at University College London; Adam Smith, Senior Lecturer in American History at University College London; Saul David, Professor of War Studies at the University of Buckingham
26 May 2011	Xenophon	Paul Cartledge, A. G. Leventis Professor of Greek Culture at Cambridge University; Edith Hall, Professor of Classics and Drama at Royal Holloway, University of London; Simon Goldhill, Professor in Greek Literature and Culture at the University of Cambridge and Fellow and Director of Studies in Classics at King's College London
2 June 2011	The Battle of Stamford Bridge	John Hines, Professor of Archaeology at Cardiff University; Elizabeth Ashman Rowe, Lecturer in Scandinavian History of the Viking Age at Clare Hall, Cambridge; Stephen Baxter, Reader in Medieval History at King's College London
9 June 2011	The Origins of Infectious Disease	Steve Jones, Professor of Genetics at University College London; Roy Anderson, Professor of Infectious Disease Epidemiology at Imperial College London; Mark Pallen, Professor of Microbial Genomics at the University of Birmingham
16 June 2011	Wyclif and the Lollards	Anthony Kenny, Philosopher and former Master of Balliol College, Oxford; Anne Hudson, Emeritus Professor of Medieval English at the University of Oxford; Rob Lutton, Lecturer in Medieval History at the University of Nottingham
23 June 2011	Malthusianism	Karen O'Brien, Pro-Vice-Chancellor for Education at the University of Birmingham; Mark Philp, Lecturer in Politics at the University of Oxford; Emma Griffin, Senior Lecturer in History at the University of East Anglia
30 June 2011	Tennyson's In Memoriam	Dinah Birch, Professor of English Literature and Pro-Vice-Chancellor for Research at Liverpool University, Seamus Perry, Fellow and Tutor in English at Balliol College, University of Oxford, Jane Wright, Lecturer in English at the University of Bristol
7 July 2011	The Minoan Civilisation	John Bennet, Professor of Aegean Archaeology at the University of Sheffield; Ellen Adams, Lecturer in Classical Art and Archaeology at King's College London; Yannis Hamilakis, Professor of Archaeology at the University of Southampton

=== 2011–2012 ===
Broadcast date Listen again	Title	Contributors and positions held at time of broadcast
15 September 2011	The Hippocratic Oath	Vivian Nutton, Emeritus Professor of the History of Medicine at University College London; Helen King, Professor of Classical Studies at the Open University; Peter Pormann, Wellcome Trust Associate Professor in Classics and Ancient History at the University of Warwick
22 September 2011	Shinto	Martin Palmer, Director of the International Consultancy on Religion, Education, and Culture; Richard Bowring, Professor of Japanese Studies at the University of Cambridge; Lucia Dolce, Senior Lecturer in Japanese Religion and Japanese at the School of Oriental and African Studies, University of London
29 September 2011	The Etruscan Civilisation	Phil Perkins, Professor of Archaeology at the Open University; David Ridgway, senior research fellow at the Institute of Classical Studies at the University of London; Corinna Riva, Lecturer in Mediterranean Archaeology at University College London
6 October 2011	David Hume	Peter Millican, Professor of Philosophy at the University of Oxford; Helen Beebee, Professor of Philosophy at the University of Birmingham; James Harris, Senior Lecturer in Philosophy at the University of St Andrews
13 October 2011	The Ming Voyages	Rana Mitter, Professor of the History and Politics of Modern China at the University of Oxford; Julia Lovell, Lecturer in Chinese History at Birkbeck College, University of London; Craig Clunas, Professor of the History of Art at the University of Oxford
20 October 2011	Delacroix's Liberty Leading the People	Tim Blanning, Former Professor of Modern European History at the University of Cambridge; Tamar Garb, Durning Lawrence Professor in the History of Art at University College London; Simon Lee, Senior Lecturer on the history of art at Reading University
27 October 2011	The Siege of Tenochtitlan	Alan Knight, Professor of the History of Latin America at the University of Oxford; Elizabeth Graham, Professor of Mesoamerican Archaeology at University College, London; Caroline Dodds Pennock, Lecturer in International History at the University of Sheffield
3 November 2011	The Moon	Paul Murdin, Visiting Professor of Astronomy at Liverpool John Moores University; Carolin Crawford, Professor of Astronomy at Gresham College and Fellow and College Lecturer at Emmanuel College, University of Cambridge; Ian Crawford, Reader in Planetary Science and Astrobiology at Birkbeck College, London
10 November 2011	The Continental-Analytic Split	Stephen Mulhall, Professor of Philosophy at New College, Oxford; Beatrice Han-Pile, Professor of Philosophy at the University of Essex; Hans-Johann Glock, Professor of Philosophy at the University of Zurich
17 November 2011	Ptolemy and Ancient Astronomy	Liba Taub, Professor of History and Philosophy of Science at Cambridge University; Jim Bennett, Director of the Museum of the History of Science at the University of Oxford; Charles Burnett, Professor of the History of Islamic Influences on Europe at the Warburg Institute, University of London
24 November 2011	Judas Maccabeus	Helen Bond, Senior Lecturer in the New Testament at University of Edinburgh; Tessa Rajak, Emeritus Professor of Ancient History at the University of Reading; Philip Alexander, Emeritus Professor of Jewish Studies at the University of Manchester
1 December 2011	Christina Rossetti	Dinah Birch, Professor of English Literature and Pro-Vice Chancellor for Research at Liverpool University; Rhian Williams, Lecturer in Nineteenth-Century English Literature at the University of Glasgow; Nicholas Shrimpton, Emeritus Fellow of Lady Margaret Hall, Oxford
8 December 2011	Heraclitus	Angie Hobbs, associate professor of Philosophy and Senior Fellow in the Public Understanding of Philosophy at the University of Warwick; Peter Adamson, Professor of Ancient and Medieval Philosophy at King's College London; James Warren, Senior Lecturer in Classics and a Fellow of Corpus Christi College, Cambridge
15 December 2011	The Concordat of Worms	Henrietta Leyser, Emeritus Fellow of St Peter's College, Oxford; Kate Cushing, Reader in Medieval History at Keele University; John Gillingham, Emeritus Professor of History at the London School of Economics and Political Science
22 December 2011	Robinson Crusoe	Karen O'Brien, Pro-Vice Chancellor for Education at the University of Birmingham; Judith Hawley, Professor of Eighteenth-Century Literature at Royal Holloway, University of London; Bob Owens, Emeritus Professor of English Literature at the Open University
29 December 2011	Macromolecules	Tony Ryan, Pro-Vice Chancellor for the Faculty of Science at the University of Sheffield; Athene Donald, Professor of Experimental Physics at the University of Cambridge and a Fellow of Robinson College; Charlotte Williams, Reader in Polymer Chemistry and Catalysis at Imperial College, London
2 January 2012	The Written World: Episode 1	Documentary format
3 January 2012	The Written World: Episode 2	Documentary format
4 January 2012	The Written World: Episode 3	Documentary format
5 January 2012	The Written World: Episode 4	Documentary format
6 January 2012	The Written World: Episode 5	Documentary format
12 January 2012	The Safavid dynasty	Robert Gleave, Professor of Arabic Studies at the University of Exeter; Emma Loosley, Senior Lecturer at the School of Arts, Histories and Cultures at the University of Manchester; Andrew Newman, Reader in Islamic Studies and Persian at the University of Edinburgh
19 January 2012	1848: Year of Revolution	Tim Blanning, Emeritus Professor of History at the University of Cambridge; Lucy Riall, Professor of History at Birkbeck, University of London; Mike Rapport, Senior Lecturer in History at the University of Stirling
26 January 2012	The Scientific method	Simon Schaffer, Professor of the History of Science at the University of Cambridge; John Worrall, Professor of the Philosophy of Science at the London School of Economics and Political Science; Michela Massimi, Senior Lecturer in the Philosophy of Science at University College London
2 February 2012	The Kama Sutra	Julius Lipner, Professor of Hinduism and the Comparative Study of Religion at the University of Cambridge; Jessica Frazier, Lecturer in Religious Studies at the University of Kent and research fellow at the Oxford Centre for Hindu Studies; David Smith, Reader in South Asian Religions at the University of Lancaster
9 February 2012	Erasmus	Diarmaid MacCulloch, Professor of the History of the Church at the University of Oxford; Eamon Duffy, Professor of the History of Christianity at the University of Cambridge; Jill Kraye, Professor of the History of Renaissance Philosophy and Librarian at the Warburg Institute, University of London
16 February 2012	The An Lushan Rebellion	Frances Wood, Lead Curator of Chinese at the British Library; Naomi Standen, Professor of Medieval History at the University of Birmingham; Hilde de Weerdt, Fellow and Lecturer in Chinese History at Pembroke College, Oxford
23 February 2012	Conductors and Semiconductors	Frank Close, Professor of Physics at the University of Oxford; Jenny Nelson, Professor of Physics at Imperial College London; Lesley Cohen, Professor of Solid State Physics at Imperial College London
1 March 2012	Benjamin Franklin	Simon Middleton, Senior Lecturer in American History at the University of Sheffield; Simon Newman, Sir Denis Brogan Professor of American History at the University of Glasgow; Patricia Fara, Senior Tutor at Clare College, Cambridge
8 March 2012	Lyrical Ballads	Judith Hawley, Professor of Eighteenth-Century Literature at Royal Holloway, University of London; Jonathan Bate, Provost of Worcester College, Oxford; Peter Swaab, Reader in English Literature at University College London
15 March 2012	Vitruvius and De Architectura	Serafina Cuomo, Reader in Roman History at Birkbeck, University of London; Robert Tavernor, Emeritus Professor of Architecture and Urban Design at the London School of Economics; Alice König, Lecturer in Latin and Classical Studies at the University of St Andrews
22 March 2012	Moses Mendelssohn	Christopher Clark, Professor of Modern European History at the University of Cambridge; Abigail Green, Tutor and Fellow in History at the University of Oxford; Adam Sutcliffe, Senior Lecturer in European History at King's College London
29 March 2012	The Measurement of Time	Kristen Lippincott, Former Director of the Royal Observatory, Greenwich; Jim Bennett, Director of the Museum of the History of Science at the University of Oxford; Jonathan Betts, Senior Curator of Horology at the Royal Observatory, Greenwich
5 April 2012	George Fox and the Quakers	Justin Champion, Professor of the History of Early Modern Ideas at Royal Holloway, University of London; John Coffey, Professor of Early Modern History at the University of Leicester; Kate Peters, Fellow in History at Murray Edwards College at the University of Cambridge
12 April 2012	Early Geology	Stephen Pumfrey, Senior Lecturer in the History of Science at Lancaster University; Andrew Scott, Professor of Applied Palaeobotany at Royal Holloway, University of London; Leucha Veneer, Research Associate at the Centre for the History of Science, Technology and Medicine at the University of Manchester
19 April 2012	Neoplatonism	Angie Hobbs, associate professor of Philosophy and Senior Fellow in the Public Understanding of Philosophy at the University of Warwick; Peter Adamson, Professor of Ancient and Medieval Philosophy at King's College London; Anne Sheppard, Professor of Ancient Philosophy at Royal Holloway, University of London
26 April 2012	The Battle of Bosworth Field	Anne Curry, Professor of Medieval History and Dean of Humanities at the University of Southampton; Steven Gunn, Tutor and Fellow in Modern History at Merton College, Oxford; David Grummitt, Lecturer in British History at the University of Kent
3 May 2012	Voltaire's Candide	David Wootton, Anniversary Professor of History at the University of York; Nicholas Cronk, Professor of French Literature and Director of the Voltaire Foundation at the University of Oxford; Caroline Warman, Lecturer in French and Fellow of Jesus College, Oxford
10 May 2012	Game theory	Ian Stewart, Emeritus Professor of Mathematics at the University of Warwick; Andrew Colman, Professor of Psychology at the University of Leicester; Richard Bradley, Professor of Philosophy at the London School of Economics and Political Science
17 May 2012	Clausewitz and On War	Saul David, Professor of War Studies at the University of Buckingham; Hew Strachan, Chichele Professor of the History of War at the University of Oxford; Beatrice Heuser, Professor of International Relations at the University of Reading
24 May 2012	Marco Polo	Frances Wood, Lead Curator of Chinese Collections at the British Library; Joan Pau Rubies, Reader in International History at the London School of Economics and Political Science; Debra Higgs Strickland, Senior Lecturer in the History of Art at the University of Glasgow
31 May 2012	The Trojan War	Edith Hall, Professor of Classics at King's College London; Ellen Adams, Lecturer in Classical Art and Archaeology at King's College London; Susan Sherratt, Lecturer in Archaeology at the University of Sheffield
7 June 2012	King Solomon	Martin Palmer, Director of the International Consultancy on Religion, Education, and Culture; Philip Alexander, Emeritus Professor of Jewish Studies at the University of Manchester; Katharine Dell, Senior Lecturer in Old Testament Studies at the University of Cambridge, and Fellow of St Catharine's College, Cambridge
14 June 2012	James Joyce's Ulysses	Steven Connor, Professor of Modern Literature and Theory at Birkbeck, University of London; Jeri Johnson, Senior Fellow in English at Exeter College, Oxford; Richard Brown, Reader in Modern English Literature at the University of Leeds
21 June 2012	Annie Besant	Lawrence Goldman, Fellow in Modern History at St Peter's College, Oxford; David Stack, Reader in History at the University of Reading; Yasmin Khan, Senior Lecturer in Politics and International Relations at Royal Holloway, University of London
28 June 2012	Al-Kindi	Hugh Kennedy, Professor of Arabic at SOAS, University of London; James Montgomery, Sir Thomas Adams's Professor of Arabic Elect at the University of Cambridge; Amira Bennison, Senior Lecturer in Middle Eastern and Islamic Studies at the University of Cambridge
5 July 2012	Scepticism	Peter Millican, Professor of Philosophy at Hertford College, Oxford; Melissa Lane, Professor of Politics at Princeton University; Jill Kraye, Professor of the History of Renaissance Philosophy and Librarian at the Warburg Institute, University of London
12 July 2012	Hadrian's Wall	Greg Woolf, Professor of Ancient History at the University of St Andrews; David Breeze, Former Chief Inspector of Ancient Monuments for Scotland and Visiting Professor of Archaeology at the University of Durham; Lindsay Allason-Jones, Former Reader in Roman Material Culture at the University of Newcastle

=== 2012–2013 ===
Broadcast date Listen again	Title	Contributors and positions held at time of broadcast
13 September 2012	The Cell	Steve Jones, Professor of Genetics at University College London; Cathie Martin, Group Leader at the John Innes Centre and Professor in the School of Biological Sciences at the University of East Anglia; Nick Lane, Senior Lecturer in the Department of Genetics, Evolution and Environment, University College London
20 September 2012	The Druids	Barry Cunliffe, Emeritus Professor of Archaeology at the University of Oxford; Miranda Aldhouse-Green, Professor of Archaeology at Cardiff University; Justin Champion, Professor of the History of Early Modern Ideas at Royal Holloway, University of London
27 September 2012	The Ontological Argument	John Haldane, Professor of Philosophy at the University of St Andrews; Peter Millican, Professor of Philosophy at the University of Oxford; Clare Carlisle, Lecturer in Philosophy of religion at King's College London
4 October 2012	Gerald of Wales	Henrietta Leyser, Emeritus Fellow of St Peter's College, Oxford; Michelle Brown, Professor Emerita of Medieval Manuscript Studies at the School of Advanced Study, University of London; Huw Pryce, Professor of Welsh History at Bangor University
11 October 2012	Hannibal	Ellen O'Gorman, Senior Lecturer in Classics at the University of Bristol; Mark Woolmer, Senior Tutor in the Department of Classics and Ancient History at the University of Durham; Louis Rawlings, Senior Lecturer in Ancient History at Cardiff University
18 October 2012	Caxton and the Printing Press	Richard Gameson, Professor of the History of the Book at the University of Durham; Julia Boffey, Professor of Medieval Studies in the English Department at Queen Mary, University of London; David Rundle, Member of the History Faculty at the University of Oxford
25 October 2012	Fermat's Last Theorem	Marcus du Sautoy, Professor of Mathematics & Simonyi Professor for the Public Understanding of Science at the University of Oxford; Vicky Neale, Fellow and Director of Studies in Mathematics at Murray Edwards College at the University of Cambridge; Samir Siksek, Professor at the Mathematics Institute at the University of Warwick
1 November 2012	The Anarchy	John Gillingham, Emeritus Professor of History at the London School of Economics and Political Science; Louise Wilkinson, Reader in Medieval History at Canterbury Christ Church University; David Carpenter, Professor of Medieval History at King's College London
8 November 2012	The Upanishads	Jessica Frazier, Lecturer in Religious Studies at the University of Kent and a research fellow at the Oxford Centre for Hindu Studies at the University of Oxford; Chakravarthi Ram-Prasad, Professor of Comparative Religion and Philosophy at Lancaster University; Simon Brodbeck, Lecturer in Religious Studies at the University of Cardiff
15 November 2012	Simone Weil	Beatrice Han-Pile, Professor of Philosophy at the University of Essex; Stephen Plant, Runcie Fellow and Dean of Trinity Hall at the University of Cambridge; David Levy, Teaching Fellow in the Department of Philosophy at the University of Edinburgh
22 November 2012	The Borgias	Evelyn Welch, Professor of Renaissance Studies at Queen Mary, University of London; Catherine Fletcher, Lecturer in Public History at the University of Sheffield; Christine Shaw, Honorary Research Fellow at Swansea University
29 November 2012	Crystallography	Judith Howard, Director of the Biophysical Sciences Institute and Professor of Chemistry at the University of Durham; Chris Hammond, Life Fellow in Material Science at the University of Leeds; Mike Glazer, Emeritus Professor of Physics at the University of Oxford and Visiting Professor of Physics at the University of Warwick
6 December 2012	Bertrand Russell	A. C. Grayling, Master of the New College of the Humanities and a Supernumerary Fellow of St Anne's College, Oxford; Mike Beaney, Professor of Philosophy at the University of York; Hilary Greaves, Lecturer in Philosophy and Fellow of Somerville College, Oxford
13 December 2012	Shahnameh of Ferdowsi	Narguess Farzad, Senior Fellow in Persian at SOAS, University of London; Charles Melville, Professor of Persian History at Pembroke College, Cambridge; Vesta Sarkhosh Curtis, Curator of Middle Eastern Coins at the British Museum
20 December 2012	The South Sea Bubble	Anne Murphy, Senior Lecturer in History at the University of Hertfordshire; Helen Paul, Lecturer in Economics and Economic History at the University of Southampton; Roey Sweet, Head of the School of History at the University of Leicester
27 December 2012	The Cult of Mithras	Greg Woolf, Professor of Ancient History at the University of St Andrews; Almut Hintze, Zartoshty Professor of Zoroastrianism at SOAS, University of London; John North, Acting Director of the Institute of Classical Studies, University of London
10 January 2013	Le Morte d'Arthur	Helen Cooper, Professor of Medieval and Renaissance English at the University of Cambridge; Helen Fulton, Professor of Medieval Literature and Head of Department of English and Related Literature at the University of York; Laura Ashe, CUF Lecturer and Tutorial Fellow at Worcester College at the University of Oxford
17 January 2013	Comets	Monica Grady, Professor of Planetary and Space Sciences at the Open University; Paul Murdin, Senior Fellow at the Institute of Astronomy at the University of Cambridge; Don Pollacco, Professor of Astronomy at the University of Warwick
24 January 2013	Romulus and Remus	Mary Beard, Professor of Classics at the University of Cambridge; Peter Wiseman, Emeritus Professor of Classics and Ancient History at the University of Exeter; Tim Cornell, Emeritus Professor of Ancient History at the University of Manchester
31 January 2013	The War of 1812	Kathleen Burk, Professor of Modern and Contemporary History at University College London; Lawrence Goldman, Fellow in Modern History at St Peter's College, Oxford; Frank Cogliano, Professor of American History at the University of Edinburgh
7 February 2013	Epicureanism	Angie Hobbs, Professor of the Public Understanding of Philosophy at the University of Sheffield; David Sedley, Laurence Professor of Ancient Philosophy at the University of Cambridge; James Warren, Reader in Ancient Philosophy at the University of Cambridge
14 February 2013	Ice ages	Jane Francis, Professor of Paleoclimatology at the University of Leeds; Richard Corfield, research fellow in Geology at the University of Oxford; Carrie Lear, Senior Lecturer in Palaeoceanography at Cardiff University
21 February 2013	Decline and Fall	David Bradshaw, Professor of English Literature at Worcester College, Oxford; John Bowen, Professor of Nineteenth-Century Literature at the University of York; Ann Pasternak Slater, senior research fellow at St Anne's College, Oxford
28 February 2013	Pitt Rivers	Adam Kuper, Visiting Professor of Anthropology at Boston University; Richard Bradley, Professor in Archaeology at the University of Reading; Dan Hicks, University Lecturer & Curator of Archaeology at the Pitt Rivers Museum at the University of Oxford
7 March 2013	Absolute Zero	Simon Schaffer, Professor of the History of Science at the University of Cambridge; Stephen Blundell, Professor of Physics at the University of Oxford; Nicola Wilkin, Lecturer in Theoretical Physics at the University of Birmingham
14 March 2013	Chekhov	Catriona Kelly, Professor of Russian at the University of Oxford; Cynthia Marsh, Emeritus Professor of Russian ama and Literature at the University of Nottingham; Rosamund Bartlett, Founding Director of the Anton Chekhov Foundation and former Reader in Russian at the University of Durham
21 March 2013	Alfred Russel Wallace	Steve Jones, Emeritus Professor of Genetics at University College London; George Beccaloni, Curator of Cockroaches and Related Insects and Director of the Wallace Correspondence Project at the Natural History Museum; Ted Benton, Professor of Sociology at the University of Essex
28 March 2013	Water	Hasok Chang, Hans Rausing Professor of History and Philosophy of Science at the University of Cambridge; Andrea Sella, Professor of Chemistry at University College London; Patricia Hunt, Senior Lecturer in Chemistry at Imperial College London
4 April 2013	Japan's Sakoku Period	Richard Bowring, Emeritus Professor of Japanese Studies at the University of Cambridge; Andrew Cobbing, associate professor of History at the University of Nottingham; Rebekah Clements, research fellow of Queens' College and Research Associate at the Faculty of Asian and Middle Eastern Studies at the University of Cambridge
11 April 2013	The Amazons	Paul Cartledge, A.G. Leventis Professor of Greek Culture at Cambridge University; Chiara Franceschini, Teaching Fellow at University College London and an Academic Assistant at the Warburg Institute; Caroline Vout, University Senior Lecturer in Classics and Fellow and Director of Studies at Christ's College, Cambridge
18 April 2013	The Putney Debates	Justin Champion, Professor of the History of Early Modern Ideas at Royal Holloway, University of London; Ann Hughes, Professor of Early Modern History at Keele University; Kate Peters, Fellow in History at Murray Edwards College, Cambridge
25 April 2013	Montaigne	David Wootton, Anniversary Professor of History at University of York; Terence Cave, Emeritus Professor of French Literature at the University of Oxford; Felicity Green, Chancellor's Fellow in History at the University of Edinburgh
2 May 2013	Gnosticism	Martin Palmer, Director of the International Consultancy on Religion, Education, and Culture; Caroline Humfress, Reader in History at Birkbeck College, University of London; Alastair Logan, Honorary University Fellow of the Department of Theology and Religion at the University of Exeter
9 May 2013	Icelandic Sagas	Carolyne Larrington, Fellow and Tutor in Medieval English Literature at St John's College, Oxford; Elizabeth Ashman Rowe, Lecturer in Scandinavian History at the University of Cambridge; Emily Lethbridge, Post-Doctoral Researcher at the Árni Magnússon Institute for Icelandic Studies in Reykjavík
16 May 2013	Cosmic rays	Carolin Crawford, Gresham Professor of Astronomy and a member of the Institute of Astronomy at the University of Cambridge; Alan Watson, Emeritus Professor of Physics at the University of Leeds; Tim Greenshaw, Professor of Physics at the University of Liverpool
23 May 2013	Lévi-Strauss	Adam Kuper, Visiting Professor of Anthropology at Boston University; Christina Howells, Professor of French at Oxford University; Vincent Debaene, associate professor of French Literature at Columbia University
30 May 2013	Queen Zenobia	Edith Hall, Professor of Classics at King's College London; Kate Cooper, Professor of Ancient History at the University of Manchester; Richard Stoneman, Honorary Visiting Professor in the Department of Classics and Ancient History at the University of Exeter
6 June 2013	Relativity	Ruth Gregory, Professor of Mathematics and Physics at Durham University; Martin Rees, Astronomer Royal and Emeritus Professor of Cosmology and Astrophysics at the University of Cambridge; Roger Penrose, Emeritus Rouse Ball Professor of Mathematics at the University of Oxford
13 June 2013	Prophecy	Mona Siddiqui, Professor of Islamic and Interreligious Studies at the University of Edinburgh; Justin Meggitt, University Senior Lecturer in the Study of Religion and the Origins of Christianity at the University of Cambridge; Jonathan Stökl, Post-Doctoral Researcher at Leiden University
20 June 2013	The Physiocrats	Richard Whatmore, Professor of Intellectual History & the History of political thought at the University of Sussex; Joel Felix, Professor of History at the University of Reading; Helen Paul, Lecturer in Economics and Economic History at the University of Southampton
27 June 2013	Romance of the Three Kingdoms	Frances Wood, Former Lead Curator of Chinese Collections at the British Library; Craig Clunas, Professor of the History of Art at the University of Oxford; Margaret Hillenbrand, University Lecturer in Modern Chinese Literature at the University of Oxford and Fellow of Wadham College
4 July 2013	The Invention of Radio	Simon Schaffer, Professor of the History of Science at the University of Cambridge; Elizabeth Bruton, Postdoctoral Researcher at the University of Leeds; John Liffen, Curator of Communications at the Science Museum, London

=== 2013–2014 ===
Broadcast date Listen again	Title	Contributors and positions held at time of broadcast
19 September 2013	Pascal	David Wootton, Anniversary Professor of History at the University of York; Michael Moriarty, Professor of French at the University of Cambridge; Michela Massimi, Senior Lecturer in the Philosophy of Science at the University of Edinburgh
26 September 2013	The Mamluks	Amira Bennison, Reader in the History and Culture of the Maghrib at the University of Cambridge and Fellow of Magdalene College, Cambridge; Robert Irwin, Former Senior Research Associate in the Department of History at SOAS, University of London; Doris Behrens-Abouseif, Nasser Khalili Professor of Islamic Art and Archaeology at SOAS, University of London
3 October 2013	Exoplanets	Carolin Crawford, Gresham Professor of Astronomy and a member of the Institute of Astronomy at the University of Cambridge; Don Pollacco, Professor of Astronomy at the University of Warwick; Suzanne Aigrain, Lecturer in Astrophysics at the University of Oxford and a Fellow of All Souls College, Oxford
10 October 2013	Galen	Vivian Nutton, Emeritus Professor of the History of Medicine at University College London; Helen King, Professor of Classical Studies at the Open University; Caroline Petit, Wellcome Trust Senior Research Fellow in Classics at the University of Warwick
17 October 2013	The Book of Common Prayer	Diarmaid MacCulloch, Professor of the History of the Church at the University of Oxford; Alexandra Walsham, Professor of Modern History at the University of Cambridge; Martin Palmer, Director of the International Consultancy on Religion, Education, and Culture
24 October 2013	The Corn Laws	Lawrence Goldman, Fellow in Modern History at St Peter's College, Oxford; Boyd Hilton, Former Professor of Modern British History at the University of Cambridge and Fellow of Trinity College, Cambridge; Cheryl Schonhardt-Bailey, Reader in Political Science at the London School of Economics
31 October 2013	The Berlin Conference	Richard Drayton, Rhodes Professor of Imperial History at King's College London; Richard Rathbone, Emeritus Professor of African History at SOAS, University of London; Joanna Lewis, assistant professor of Imperial History at the London School of Economics, University of London
7 November 2013	Ordinary language philosophy	Stephen Mulhall, Professor of Philosophy at New College, Oxford; Ray Monk, Professor of Philosophy at the University of Southampton; Julia Tanney, Reader in Philosophy of Mind at the University of Kent
14 November 2013	The Tempest	Jonathan Bate, Provost of Worcester College, Oxford; Erin Sullivan, Lecturer and Fellow at the Shakespeare Institute, University of Birmingham; Katherine Duncan-Jones, emeritus fellow of Somerville College, Oxford
21 November 2013	Pocahontas	Susan Castillo, Harriet Beecher Stowe Emeritus Professor of American Studies at King's College London; Tim Lockley, Reader in American Studies at the University of Warwick; Jacqueline Fear-Segal, Reader in American History and Culture at the University of East Anglia
28 November 2013	The Microscope	Jim Bennett, Visiting Keeper at the Science Museum, London; Colin Humphreys, Professor of Materials Science and Director of Research at the University of Cambridge; Michelle Peckham, Professor of Cell Biology at the University of Leeds
5 December 2013	Hindu Ideas of Creation	Jessica Frazier, Lecturer in Religious Studies at the University of Kent and a research fellow of the Oxford Centre for Hindu Studies at the University of Oxford; Chakravarthi Ram-Prasad, Professor of Comparative Religion and Philosophy at Lancaster University; Gavin Flood, Professor of Hindu Studies and Comparative Religion at the University of Oxford
12 December 2013	Pliny the Younger	Catharine Edwards, Professor of Classics and Ancient History at Birkbeck, University of London; Roy Gibson, Professor of Latin at the University of Manchester; Alice König, Lecturer in Latin and Classical Studies at the University of St Andrews
19 December 2013	Complexity	Ian Stewart, Emeritus Professor of Mathematics at the University of Warwick; Jeff Johnson, Professor of Complexity Science and Design at the Open University; Eve Mitleton-Kelly, Director of the Complexity Research Group at the London School of Economics
26 December 2013	The Medici	Evelyn Welch, Professor of Renaissance Studies at King's College London; Robert Black, Professor of Renaissance History at the University of Leeds; Catherine Fletcher, Lecturer in Public History at the University of Sheffield
2 January 2014	Plato's Symposium	Angie Hobbs, Professor of the Public Understanding of Philosophy at the University of Sheffield; Richard L. Hunter, Regius Professor of Greek at the University of Cambridge; Frisbee Sheffield, Director of Studies in Philosophy at Christ's College, Cambridge
16 January 2014	The Battle of Tours	Hugh N. Kennedy, Professor of Arabic at SOAS, University of London; Rosamond McKitterick, Professor of Medieval History, University of Cambridge; Matthew Innes, Vice Master and Professor of History, Birkbeck, University of London
23 January 2014	Sources of Early Chinese History	Roel Sterckx, Joseph Needham Professorship of Chinese History, Science, and Civilization at the University of Cambridge; Tim Barrett, Professor of East Asian History at SOAS, University of London; Hilde de Weerdt, Professor of Chinese History at Leiden University
30 January 2014	Catastrophism	Andrew Scott, Leverhulme Emeritus Fellow in the Department of Earth Sciences at Royal Holloway, University of London; Jan Zalasiewicz, Senior Lecturer in Geology at the University of Leicester; Leucha Veneer, Visiting Scholar at the Faculty of Life Sciences at the University of Manchester
6 February 2014	The Phoenicians	Mark Woolmer, Assistant Principal at Collingwood College, Durham University; Josephine Quinn, Martin Frederiksen Fellow and Tutor in Ancient History, Worcester College, Oxford; Cyprian Broodbank, Professor of Mediterranean Archaeology at University College London
13 February 2014	Chivalry	Miri Rubin, Professor of Early Modern History at Queen Mary University of London; Matthew Strickland, Professor at School of Humanities / Sgoil nan Daonnachdan, University of Glasgow; Laura Ashe, University Lecturer and Tutorial Fellow Worcester College, University of Oxford
20 February 2014	Social Darwinism	Adam Kuper, Centennial Professor of Anthropology at the LSE, University of London; Gregory Radick, Professor of History and Philosophy of Science at the University of Leeds; Charlotte Sleigh, Reader in the History of Science at the University of Kent
27 February 2014	The Eye	Patricia Fara, Senior Tutor and Director of Studies Clare College, Cambridge; William Ayliffe, FRCS PhD, Consultant Ophthalmologist at Lister Hospital, London, Professor at Gresham College; Robert Iliffe, Professor of Intellectual History and History of Science, University of Sussex
6 March 2014	Spartacus	Mary Beard, Professor of Classics Newnham College, Cambridge; Maria Wyke, Professor of Latin, co-director of the Centre for Research into the Dynamics of Civilisation, University College London; Theresa Urbainczyk, Associate Professor of Classics (Scoil na gClasaicí UCD), University College Dublin
13 March 2014	The Trinity	Janet Soskice, Professor of Philosophical Theology at the University of Cambridge and a Fellow of Jesus College, Cambridge; Martin Palmer, Director of the International Consultancy on Religion, Education, and Culture; The Reverend Graham Ward, Regius Professor of Divinity at the University of Oxford and a Canon of Christ Church
20 March 2014	Bishop Berkeley	Peter Millican, Gilbert Ryle Fellow and Professor of Philosophy at Hertford College, Oxford; Tom Stoneham, Professor of Philosophy at the University of York; Michela Massimi, Senior Lecturer in Philosophy of Science at the University of Edinburgh
27 March 2014	Weber's The Protestant Ethic	Peter Ghosh, Fellow in History at St Anne's College, Oxford; Sam Whimster, Honorary Professor in Sociology at the University of New South Wales; Linda Woodhead, Professor of Sociology of Religion at Lancaster University
3 April 2014	States of Matter	Andrea Sella, Professor of Materials and Inorganic Chemistry at University College London; Athene Donald, Professor of Experimental Physics at the University of Cambridge; Justin Wark, Professor of Physics and Fellow of Trinity College, Oxford
10 April 2014	Strabo's Geographica	Paul Cartledge, A. G. Leventis Professor of Greek Culture at the University of Cambridge; Maria Pretzler, Senior Lecturer in Ancient History at Swansea University; Benet Salway, Senior Lecturer in Ancient History at University College London
17 April 2014	The Domesday Book	Stephen Baxter, Reader in Medieval History at King's College London; Elisabeth van Houts, Honorary Professor of Medieval European History at the University of Cambridge; David Bates, Professorial Fellow in Medieval History at the University of East Anglia
24 April 2014	Tristram Shandy	Judith Hawley, Professor of Eighteenth-Century Literature at Royal Holloway, University of London; John Mullan, Professor of English at University College London; Mary Newbould, Bowman Supervisor in English at Wolfson College, University of Cambridge
1 May 2014	The Tale of Sinuhe	Richard B. Parkinson, Professor of Egyptology and Fellow of The Queen's College, Oxford; Roland Emmarch, Senior Lecturer in Egyptology at the University of Liverpool; Aidan Dodson, Senior Research Fellow in the Department of Archaeology and Anthropology at the University of Bristol
8 May 2014	The Sino-Japanese War	Rana Mitter, Professor of the History and Politics of Modern China; Fellow of St Cross College University of Oxford; Barak Kushner, Senior Lecturer in Japanese History at the University of Cambridge; Tehyun Ma, Lecturer in Chinese History at University of Exeter
15 May 2014	Photosynthesis	Sandra Knapp, Botanist at The Natural History Museum, London; Nick Lane, Reader in Evolutionary Biochemistry at University College London; John F. Allen, Professor of Biochemistry at Queen Mary, University of London
22 May 2014	The Rubaiyat of Omar Khayyam	Charles Melville, Professor of Asian and Middle Eastern Studies at the University of Cambridge; Daniel Karlin, Winterstoke Professor of English at the University of Bristol; Kirstie Blair, Professor of English Studies at the University of Stirling
29 May 2014	The Talmud	Philip Alexander, Professor of Post-Biblical Jewish Literature at the University of Manchester; Norman Solomon, Rabbi, Former Lecturer at the Oxford Centre for Jewish and Hebrew Studies; Laliv Clenman, Lecturer in Rabbinic Literature at Leo Baeck College and a Visiting Lecturer at the Department of Theology and Religious Studies, King's College London
5 June 2014	The Bluestockings	Karen O'Brien, Professor of English Literature at King's College London; Elizabeth Eger, Reader at King's College London; Nicole Pohl, Reader in Early Modern Literature and Critical Theory at Oxford Brookes University
12 June 2014	Robert Boyle	Simon Schaffer, Professor the History and Philosophy of Science at the University of Cambridge; Michael Hunter, Professor at the Department of History, Classics and Archaeology at Birkbeck College, University of London; Anna Marie Roos, Senior Lecturer in Faculty of Media Humanities and Performance at the University of Lincoln
19 June 2014	The Philosophy of Solitude	Melissa Lane, Professor of Politics at Princeton University; Simon Blackburn, Fellow of University of Cambridge; John Haldane, Professor of Philosophy at University of St Andrews
26 June 2014	Hildegard of Bingen	Miri Rubin, Professor of Medieval and Early Modern History and Head of the School of History at Queen Mary, University of London; William Flynn, Lecturer in Medieval Latin at the University of Leeds; Almut Suerbaum, Lecturer in German, Fellow of Somerville at the University of Oxford
3 July 2014	Mrs Dalloway	Hermione Lee, President of Wolfson College, Oxford; Jane Goldman, Reader in English Literature at the University of Glasgow; Kathryn Simpson, Senior Lecturer in English Literature at Cardiff Metropolitan University
10 July 2014	The Sun	Carolin Crawford, Fellow of Emmanuel College, Cambridge, Professor of Astronomy at Gresham College; Yvonne Elsworth, Professor of Helioseismology, Poynting Professor of Physics at the University of Birmingham; Louise Harra, Professor of solar physics at Mullard Space Science Laboratory, UCL

=== 2014–2015 ===
Broadcast date Listen again	Title	Contributors and positions held at time of broadcast
25 September 2014	e	Colva Roney-Dougal, Reader in Pure Mathematics at the University of St Andrews; June Barrow-Green, Senior Lecturer in the History of Maths at the Open University; Vicky Neale, Whitehead Lecturer at the Mathematical Institute and Balliol College, Oxford
2 October 2014	Julius Caesar	Christopher Pelling, Regius Professor of Greek at the University of Oxford; Catherine Steel, Professor of Classics at the University of Glasgow; Maria Wyke, Professor of Latin at University College London
9 October 2014	The Battle of Talas	Hilde de Weerdt, Professor of Chinese History at Leiden University; Michael Höckelmann, British Academy Postdoctoral Fellow in the Department of History at King's College London; Hugh Kennedy, Professor of Arabic at SOAS, University of London
16 October 2014	Rudyard Kipling	Howard Booth, Senior Lecturer in English Literature, University of Manchester; Daniel Karlin, Research Fellow in English, William Wills of English, University of Bristol; Jan Montefiore, Professor of 20th Century English Literature, University of Kent
23 October 2014	The Haitian Revolution	Kate Hodgson, Doctor of Cultures, Languages and Area Studies, University of Liverpool; Tim Lockley, School of Comparative American Studies, University of Warwick; Karen Salt, Research Fellow at School of Divinity, History and philosophy, University of Aberdeen
30 October 2014	Nuclear Fusion	Philippa Browning, Professor of Astrophysics, Jodrell Bank Centre for Astrophysics, School of Physics and Astronomy, University of Manchester; Steve Cowley, Professor in Plasma Physics, Faculty of Natural Sciences, Department of Physics Imperial College, London; Justin Wark, Professor of Physics, University of Oxford
6 November 2014	Hatshepsut	Elizabeth Frood, Associate Professor of Egyptology; Fellow of St Cross College the University of Oxford; Kate Spence, Lecturer in Egyptian Archaeology at the University of Cambridge; Campbell Price, Curator of Department of Egypt & Syria, Manchester Museum (The University of Manchester)
13 November 2014	Brunel	Julia Elton, Past President of the Newcomen Society; Ben Marsden, Senior Lecturer, School of Divinity, History and philosophy, University of Aberdeen; Crosbie Smith, Emeritus Professor of History at the University of Kent
20 November 2014	Aesop	Pavlos Avlamis, Faculty of Classics Research Lecturer, Trinity College, Oxford; Lucy Grig, Senior Lecturer in Roman History at the University of Edinburgh; Simon Goldhill, Professor of Greek Literature and Culture, Fellow and Director of Studies in Classics at King's College, Cambridge
27 November 2014	Kafka's The Trial	Elizabeth Boa, Emeritus Professor of German, University of Nottingham; Steve Connor, Professor of English, Peterhouse, Cambridge; Ritchie Robertson, Taylor Professor of the German Language and Literature, The Queen's College, Oxford
4 December 2014	Zen	Tim Barrett, Emeritus Professor at Department of the Study of Religions, SOAS, University of London; Lucia Dolce, Numata Reader in Japanese Buddhism at SOAS, University of London; Eric Greene, Lecturer in East Asian Religions at the University of Bristol
11 December 2014	Behavioural ecology	Steve Jones, Emeritus Professor of Genetics, School of Life and Medical Sciences at University College London; Rebecca Kilner, Professor of Evolutionary biology at Department of Zoology, University of Cambridge; John Krebs, Principal at Jesus College, Oxford
18 December 2014	Truth	Simon Blackburn, Fellow of Trinity College, University of Cambridge, and Professor of Philosophy at the New College of the Humanities; Jennifer Hornsby, Professor of Philosophy at Birkbeck, University of London; Crispin Wright, Regius Professor of Logic at the University of Aberdeen, and Professor of Philosophy at New York University
15 January 2015	Bruegel's The Fight Between Carnival and Lent	Louise Milne, Lecturer in Visual Culture in the School of Art at the University of Edinburgh and Edinburgh Napier University; Jeanne Nuechterlein, Senior Lecturer in the Department of History of Art, University of York; Miri Rubin, Professor of Medieval and Early Modern History and Head of the School of History at Queen Mary, University of London
22 January 2015	Phenomenology	Simon Glendinning, Professor of European Philosophy in the European Institute at the London School of Economics; Joanna Hodge, Professor of Philosophy at Manchester Metropolitan University; Stephen Mulhall, Professor of Philosophy and Tutor at New College, Oxford
29 January 2015	Thucydides	Paul Cartledge, Emeritus Professor of Greek Culture and AG Leventis Senior Research Fellow at Clare College, Cambridge; Katherine Harloe, Associate Professor in Classics and Intellectual History at the University of Reading; Neville Morley, Professor of Ancient History at the University of Bristol
5 February 2015	Ashoka the Great	Jessica Frazier, Lecturer in Religious Studies at the University of Kent and a research fellow at the Oxford Centre for Hindu Studies; Naomi Appleton, Chancellor's Fellow in Religious Studies at the University of Edinburgh; Richard Gombrich, Founder and Academic Director of the Oxford Centre for Buddhist Studies and Emeritus Professor of Sanskrit at the University of Oxford
12 February 2015	The Photon	Frank Close, Professor Emeritus of Physics at the University of Oxford; Wendy Flavell, Professor of Surface Physics at the University of Manchester; Susan Cartwright, Senior Lecturer in Physics and Astronomy at the University of Sheffield
19 February 2015	The Wealth of Nations	Richard Whatmore, Professor of Modern History and Director of the Institute of Intellectual History at the University of St Andrews; Donald Winch, Emeritus Professor of Intellectual History at the University of Sussex; Helen Paul, Lecturer in Economics and Economic History at the University of Southampton
26 February 2015	The Eunuch	Karen Radner, Professor of Ancient Near Eastern History at University College London; Shaun Tougher, Reader in Ancient History at Cardiff University; Michael Hoeckelmann, British Academy Postdoctoral Fellow in the Department of History at King's College London
5 March 2015	Beowulf	Laura Ashe, Associate Professor in English at the University of Oxford and Fellow of Worcester College; Clare Lees, Professor of Medieval English Literature and History of the Language at King's College London; Andy Orchard, Rawlinson and Bosworth Professor of Anglo-Saxon at the University of Oxford
12 March 2015	Dark matter	Carolin Crawford, Public Astronomer at the Institute of Astronomy, University of Cambridge; Gresham Professor of Astronomy Carlos Frenk, Ogden Professor of Fundamental Physics and Director of the Institute for Computational Cosmology at the University of Durham; Anne Green, Reader in Physics at the University of Nottingham
19 March 2015	Al-Ghazali	Peter Adamson, Professor of Late Ancient and Arabic Philosophy at LMU Munich; Carole Hillenbrand, Professor of Islamic History at Edinburgh and St Andrews Universities; Robert Gleave, Professor of Arabic Studies at the University of Exeter
26 March 2015	The Curies	Patricia Fara, Senior Tutor of Clare College, University of Cambridge; Robert Fox, Emeritus Professor of the History of Science at the University of Oxford; Steven T Bramwell, Professor of Physics and former Professor of Chemistry at University College London
2 April 2015	The California Gold Rush	Kathleen Burk, Professor of Modern and Contemporary History at University College London; Jacqueline Fear-Segal, Reader in American History and Culture at the University of East Anglia; Frank Cogliano, Professor of American History at the University of Edinburgh
9 April 2015	Sappho	Edith Hall, Professor of Classics at King's College London; Margaret Reynolds, Professor of English at Queen Mary University of London; Dirk Obbink, Professor of Papyrology and Greek Literature at the University of Oxford
16 April 2015	Matteo Ricci and the Ming dynasty	Mary Laven, Reader in Early Modern History at the University of Cambridge; Craig Clunas, Professor of the History of Art at the University of Oxford; Anne Gerritsen, Reader in History at the University of Warwick
23 April 2015	Fanny Burney	Nicole Pohl, Reader in English Literature at Oxford Brookes University; Judith Hawley, Professor of Eighteenth-Century Literature at Royal Holloway, University of London; John Mullan, Professor of English at University College London
30 April 2015	The Earth's core	Stephen Blundell, Professor of Physics and Fellow of Mansfield College, University of Oxford; Arwen Deuss, associate professor in Seismology at Utrecht University; Simon Redfern, Professor of Mineral Physics at the University of Cambridge
7 May 2015	Tagore	Chandrika Kaul, Lecturer in Modern History at the University of St Andrews; Bashabi Fraser, Professor of English Literature and Creative Writing at Edinburgh Napier University; John Stevens, Leverhulme Postdoctoral Fellow at SOAS, University of London
14 May 2015	The Lancashire Cotton Famine	Chandrika Kaul, Lecturer in Modern History at the University of St Andrews; Emma Griffin, Professor of History at the University of East Anglia; David Brown, Senior Lecturer in American Studies at University of Manchester
21 May 2015	Josephus	Tessa Rajak, Professor Emeritus of Ancient History, University of Reading; Philip Alexander, Professor Emeritus of Jewish Studies, University of Manchester; Martin Goodman, Professor of Jewish Studies, University of Oxford and President of the Oxford Centre for Hebrew and Jewish Studies
28 May 2015	The Science of Glass	Paul McMillan, Professor of Chemistry at University College London; Dame Athene Donald, Professor of Experimental Physics at the University of Cambridge and Master of Churchill College, Cambridge; Jim Bennett, Former Director of the Museum of the History of Science at the University of Oxford and Keeper Emeritus at the Science Museum
4 June 2015	Prester John	Marianne O'Doherty, associate professor in English at the University of Southampton; Martin Palmer, Director of the International Consultancy on Religion, Education, and Culture; Amanda Power, Senior Lecturer in Medieval History at the University of Sheffield
11 June 2015	Utilitarianism	Melissa Lane, The Class of 1943 Professor of Politics at Princeton University; Janet Radcliffe Richards, Professor of Practical Philosophy at the University of Oxford; Brad Hooker, Professor of Philosophy at the University of Reading
18 June 2015	Jane Eyre	Dinah Birch, Professor of English Literature and Pro-Vice-Chancellor for Research at the University of Liverpool; Karen O'Brien, Vice Principal and Professor of English Literature at King's College London; Sara Lyons, Lecturer in Victorian Literature at the University of Kent
25 June 2015	Extremophiles	Monica Grady, Professor of Planetary and Space Sciences at the Open University; Ian Crawford, Professor of Planetary Science and Astrobiology at Birkbeck, University of London; Nick Lane, Reader in Evolutionary Biochemistry at University College London
2 July 2015	Frederick the Great	Tim Blanning, Emeritus Professor of Modern European History at the University of Cambridge; Katrin Kohl, Professor of German Literature at the University of Oxford and a Fellow of Jesus College; Thomas Biskup, Lecturer in Early Modern History at the University of Hull
9 July 2015	Frida Kahlo	Patience Schell, Chair in Hispanic Studies at the University of Aberdeen; Valerie Fraser, Emeritus Professor of Latin American Art at the University of Essex; Alan Knight, Emeritus Professor of the History of Latin America at the University of Oxford

=== 2015–2016 ===
From the start of 2016, (Saturn) the podcast version of the programme started to include a few minutes of unbroadcast extra material, which would generally be prompted by the question So, what did we miss?

Broadcast date Listen again	Title	Contributors and positions held at time of broadcast
24 September 2015	Perpetual motion	Ruth Gregory, Professor of Mathematics and Physics at Durham University; Frank Close, Professor Emeritus of Physics at the University of Oxford; Steven Bramwell, Professor of Physics and former Professor of Chemistry at University College London
1 October 2015	Alexander the Great	Paul Cartledge, Emeritus Professor of Greek Culture and AG Leventis Senior Research Fellow at Clare College, University of Cambridge; Diana Spencer, Professor of Classics at the University of Birmingham; Rachel Mairs, Lecturer in Classics at the University of Reading
15 October 2015	Holbein at the Tudor Court	Susan Foister, Curator of Early Netherlandish, German and British Painting at the National Gallery; John Guy, a fellow of Clare College, University of Cambridge; Maria Hayward, Professor of Early Modern History at the University of Southampton
22 October 2015	Simone de Beauvoir	Christina Howells, Professor of French and Fellow of Wadham College at the University of Oxford; Margaret Atack, Professor of French at the University of Leeds; Ursula Tidd, Professor of Modern French Literature and Thought at the University of Manchester
29 October 2015	The Empire of Mali	Amira Bennison, Reader in the History and Culture of the Maghrib at the University of Cambridge; Marie Rodet, Senior Lecturer in the History of Africa at SOAS; Kevin MacDonald, Professor of African Archaeology, Chair of the African Studies Programme at University College London
5 November 2015	P v NP	Colva Roney-Dougal, Reader in Pure Mathematics at the University of St Andrews; Timothy Gowers, Royal Society Research Professor in Mathematics at the University of Cambridge; Leslie Ann Goldberg, Professor of Computer Science and Fellow of St Edmund Hall, University of Oxford
12 November 2015	The Battle of Lepanto	Diarmaid MacCulloch, Professor of the History of the Church at the University of Oxford; Kate Fleet, Director of the Skilliter Centre for Ottoman Studies and Fellow of Newnham College, Cambridge; Noel Malcolm, senior research fellow in History at All Souls College, University of Oxford
19 November 2015	Emma	Janet Todd, Professor Emerita of Literature, University of Aberdeen, and Honorary Fellow of Newnham College, Cambridge; John Mullan, Professor of English at University College London; Emma Clery, Professor of English at the University of Southampton
26 November 2015	The Salem Witch Trials	Susan Castillo, Harriet Beecher Stowe Professor of American Studies at King's College London; Simon Middleton, Senior Lecturer in History at the University of Sheffield; Marion Gibson, Professor of Renaissance and Magical Literatures at the University of Exeter
3 December 2015	Voyages of James Cook	Simon Schaffer, Professor of the History of Science at the University of Cambridge; Rebekah Higgitt, Lecturer in the History of Science at the University of Kent; Sophie Forgan, Retired Principal Lecturer at the University of Teesside, and Chairman of Trustees of the Captain Cook Museum, Whitby
10 December 2015	Chinese Legalism	Frances Wood, Former Curator of the Chinese Collections at the British Library; Hilde de Weerdt, Professor of Chinese History at Leiden University; Roel Sterckx, Joseph Needham Professor of Chinese History at the University of Cambridge
17 December 2015	Circadian rhythms	Russell Foster, Professor of Circadian Neuroscience at the University of Oxford; Debra Skene, Professor of Neuroendocrinology at the University of Surrey; Steve Jones, Emeritus Professor of Genetics at University College London
24 December 2015	Michael Faraday	Geoffrey Cantor, Professor Emeritus of the History of Science at the University of Leeds; Laura Herz, Professor of Physics at the University of Oxford; Frank James, Professor of the History of Science at the Royal Institution
31 December 2015	Tristan and Iseult	Laura Ashe, associate professor of English at Worcester College, Oxford; Juliette Wood, Associate Lecturer in the School of Welsh at Cardiff University; Mark Chinca, Reader in Medieval German literature at the University of Cambridge
14 January 2016	Saturn	Carolin Crawford, Public Astronomer at the Institute of Astronomy and Fellow of Emmanuel College, Cambridge; Michele Dougherty, Professor of Space Physics at Imperial College London; Andrew Coates, Deputy Director in charge of the Solar System at the Mullard Space Science Laboratory at University College London
21 January 2016	Thomas Paine's Common Sense	Kathleen Burk, Professor Emerita of Modern and Contemporary History at University College London; Nicholas Guyatt, University Lecturer in American History at the University of Cambridge; Peter Thompson, associate professor of American History at the University of Oxford and Fellow of St Cross College
28 January 2016	Eleanor of Aquitaine	Lindy Grant, Professor of Medieval History at the University of Reading; Nicholas Vincent, Professor of Medieval History at the University of East Anglia; Julie Barrau, University Lecturer in British Medieval History at the University of Cambridge
4 February 2016	Chromatography	Andrea Sella, Professor of Chemistry at University College London; Apryll Stalcup, Professor of Chemical Sciences at Dublin City University; Leon Barron, Senior Lecturer in Forensic Science at King's College London
11 February 2016	Rumi's Poetry	Alan Williams, British Academy Wolfson Research Professor at the University of Manchester; Carole Hillenbrand, Professor of Islamic History at the University of St Andrews and Professor Emerita of University of Edinburgh; Lloyd Ridgeon, Reader in Islamic Studies at the University of Glasgow
18 February 2016	Robert Hooke	David Wootton, Anniversary Professor of History at the University of York; Patricia Fara, President Elect of the British Society for the History of Science; Rob Iliffe, Professor of History of Science at University of Oxford
25 February 2016	Mary Magdalene	Joanne Anderson, Lecturer in Art History at the Warburg Institute, School of Advanced Study, University of London; Eamon Duffy, Emeritus Professor of the History of Christianity at the University of Cambridge and Fellow of Magdalene College; Joan Taylor, Professor of Christian Origins and Second Temple Judaism at King's College London
3 March 2016	The Dutch East India Company	Anne Goldgar, Reader in Early Modern European History at King's College London; Chris Nierstrasz, Lecturer in Global History at Erasmus University, Rotterdam, formerly at the University of Warwick; Helen Paul, Lecturer in Economics and Economic History at the University of Southampton
10 March 2016	The Maya Civilization	Elizabeth Graham, Professor of Mesoamerican Archaeology at University College London; Matthew Restall, Edwin Erle Sparks Professor of Latin American History and Anthropology at Pennsylvania State University; Benjamin Vis, Eastern ARC Research Fellow in Digital Humanities at the University of Kent
17 March 2016	Bedlam	Hilary Marland, Professor of History at the University of Warwick; Justin Champion, Professor of the History of Early Modern Ideas at Royal Holloway, University of London and president of the Historical Association; Jonathan Andrews, Reader in the History of Psychiatry at Newcastle University
24 March 2016	Aurora Leigh	Margaret Reynolds, Professor of English at Queen Mary University of London; Daniel Karlin, Winterstoke Professor of English Literature at the University of Bristol; Karen O'Brien, Professor of English Literature at King's College London
31 March 2016	Agrippina the Younger	Catharine Edwards, Professor of Classics and Ancient History at Birkbeck, University of London; Alice König, Lecturer in Latin and Classical Studies at the University of St Andrews; Matthew Nicholls, associate professor of Classics at the University of Reading
7 April 2016	The Sikh Empire	Gurharpal Singh, Professor in Inter-Religious Relations and Development at SOAS, University of London; Chandrika Kaul, Lecturer in Modern History at the University of St Andrews; Susan Stronge, Senior Curator in the Asian Department of the Victoria and Albert Museum
14 April 2016	The Neutron	Val Gibson, Professor of High Energy Physics at the University of Cambridge and fellow of Trinity College; Andrew Harrison, chief executive officer of Diamond Light Source and Professor in Chemistry at the University of Edinburgh; Frank Close, Professor Emeritus of Physics at the University of Oxford
21 April 2016	1816, the Year Without a Summer	Clive Oppenheimer, Professor of Volcanology at the University of Cambridge; Jane Stabler, Professor in Romantic Literature at the University of St Andrews; Lawrence Goldman, Director of the Institute of Historical Research at the University of London
28 April 2016	Euclid's Elements	Marcus du Sautoy, Professor of Mathematics and Simonyi Professor for the Public Understanding of Science at the University of Oxford; Serafina Cuomo, Reader in Roman History at Birkbeck, University of London; June Barrow-Green, Professor of the History of Mathematics at the Open University
5 May 2016	Tess of the d'Urbervilles	Dinah Birch, Professor of English Literature and Pro-Vice-Chancellor for Research and Impact at the University of Liverpool; Francis O'Gorman, Professor of Victorian Literature at the University of Leeds; Jane Thomas, Reader in Victorian and early Twentieth Century literature at the University of Hull
12 May 2016	Titus Oates and his 'Popish Plot'	Clare Jackson, Senior Tutor and Director of Studies in History at Trinity Hall, University of Cambridge; Mark Knights, Professor of History at the University of Warwick; Peter Hinds, associate professor of English at Plymouth University
19 May 2016	The Muses	Paul Cartledge, Emeritus Professor of Greek Culture and A. G. Leventis Senior Research Fellow at Clare College, Cambridge; Angie Hobbs, Professor of the Public Understanding of Philosophy, University of Sheffield; Penelope Murray, Founder member and retired Senior Lecturer, Department of Classics, University of Warwick
26 May 2016	The Gettysburg Address	Catherine Clinton, Denman Chair of American History at the University of Texas and International Professor at Queen's University Belfast; Susan-Mary Grant, Professor of American History at Newcastle University; Tim Lockley, Professor of American History at the University of Warwick
2 June 2016	Margery Kempe and English Mysticism	Miri Rubin, Professor of Medieval and Early Modern History at Queen Mary, University of London; Katherine Lewis, Senior Lecturer in History at the University of Huddersfield; Anthony Bale, Professor of Medieval Studies at Birkbeck, University of London
9 June 2016	Penicillin	Laura Piddock, Professor of Microbiology at the University of Birmingham; Christoph Tang, Professor of Cellular Pathology and Professorial Fellow at Exeter College at the University of Oxford; Steve Jones, Emeritus Professor of Genetics at University College London
16 June 2016	The Bronze Age Collapse	John Bennet, Director of the British School at Athens and Professor of Aegean Archaeology at the University of Sheffield: Linda Hulin, Fellow of Harris Manchester College and Research Officer at the Oxford Centre for Maritime Archaeology at the University of Oxford; Simon Stoddart, Fellow of Magdalene College and Reader in Prehistory at the University of Cambridge
23 June 2016	Songs of Innocence and of Experience	Jonathan Bate, Provost of Worcester College, Oxford; Sarah Haggarty, Lecturer at the Faculty of English and Fellow of Queens' College, Cambridge; Jon Mee, Professor of Eighteenth-Century Studies at the University of York
30 June 2016	Sovereignty	Melissa Lane, Class of 1943 Professor of Politics at Princeton University; Richard Bourke, Professor in the History of Political Thought at Queen Mary, University of London; Tim Stanton, Senior Lecturer in the Department of Politics at the University of York
7 July 2016	The Invention of Photography	Simon Schaffer, Professor of the History of Science at the University of Cambridge; Elizabeth Edwards, Emeritus Professor of Photographic History at De Montfort University; Alison Morrison-Low, Research Associate at National Museums of Scotland

=== 2016–2017 ===
Broadcast date Listen again	Title	Contributors and positions held at time of broadcast
22 September 2016	Zeno's paradoxes	Marcus du Sautoy, Professor of Mathematics and Simonyi Professor for the Public Understanding of Science at the University of Oxford; Barbara Sattler, Lecturer in Philosophy at the University of St Andrews; James Warren, Reader in Ancient Philosophy at the University of Cambridge
29 September 2016	Animal Farm	Steven Connor, Grace 2 Professor of English at the University of Cambridge; Mary Vincent, Professor of Modern European History at the University of Sheffield; Robert Colls, Professor of Cultural History at De Montfort University
6 October 2016	Lakshmi	Jessica Frazier, Lecturer in Religious Studies at the University of Kent, research fellow at the Oxford Centre for Hindu Studies at the University of Oxford; Jacqueline Suthren-Hirst, Senior Lecturer in South Asian Studies at the University of Manchester; Chakravarthi Ram-Prasad, Professor of Comparative Religion and Philosophy at Lancaster University
13 October 2016	Plasma	Justin Wark, Professor of Physics and Fellow of Trinity College at the University of Oxford; Kate Lancaster, research fellow for Innovation and Impact at the York Plasma Institute at the University of York; Bill Graham, Professor of Physics at Queen's University Belfast
20 October 2016	The 12th Century Renaissance	Laura Ashe, associate professor of English at Worcester College, Oxford; Elisabeth van Houts, Honorary Professor of Medieval European History at the University of Cambridge; Giles Gasper, Reader in Medieval History at Durham University
27 October 2016	John Dalton	Jim Bennett, Associate Former Director of the Museum of the History of Science at the University of Oxford and Keeper Emeritus at the Science Museum; Aileen Fyfe, Reader in British History at the University of St Andrews; James Sumner, Lecturer in the History of Technology at the Centre for the History of Science, Technology and Medicine at the University of Manchester
3 November 2016	Epic of Gilgamesh	Andrew George, Professor of Babylonian at SOAS, University of London; Frances Reynolds, Shillito Fellow in Assyriology at the Oriental Institute, University of Oxford and Fellow of St Benet's Hall; Martin Worthington, Lecturer in Assyriology at the University of Cambridge
10 November 2016	The Fighting Temeraire	Susan Foister, Curator of Early Netherlandish, German and British Painting at the National Gallery; David Blayney Brown, Manton Curator of British Art 1790–1850 at Tate Britain; James Davey, Curator of Naval History at the National Maritime Museum
17 November 2016	Justinian's Legal Code	Caroline Humfress, Professor of Medieval History at the University of St Andrews; Simon Corcoran, Lecturer in Ancient History at Newcastle University; Paul du Plessis, Senior Lecturer in Civil law and European legal history at the School of Law University of Edinburgh
24 November 2016	Baltic Crusades	Aleks Pluskowski, associate professor of Archaeology at the University of Reading; Nora Berend, Fellow of St Catharine's College and Reader in European History at the Faculty of History at the University of Cambridge; Martin Palmer, Director of the International Consultancy on Religion, Education, and Culture
1 December 2016	Garibaldi and the Risorgimento	Lucy Riall, Professor of Comparative History of Europe at the European University Institute and Professor of History at Birkbeck, University of London; Eugenio Biagini, Professor of Modern and Contemporary History at the University of Cambridge; David Laven, associate professor of History at the University of Nottingham
8 December 2016	Harriet Martineau	Valerie Sanders, Professor of English at the University of Hull; Karen O'Brien, Professor of English Literature at the University of Oxford; Ella Dzelzainis, Lecturer in 19th Century Literature at Newcastle University
15 December 2016	The Gin Craze	Angela McShane, research fellow in History at the Victoria and Albert Museum and University of Sheffield; Judith Hawley, Professor of 18th century literature at Royal Holloway, University of London; Emma Major, Senior Lecturer in English at the University of York
22 December 2016	Four Quartets	David Moody, Emeritus Professor of English and American Literature at the University of York; Fran Brearton, Professor of Modern Poetry at Queen's University Belfast; Mark Ford, Professor of English and American Literature at University College London
29 December 2016	Johannes Kepler	David Wootton, Professor of History at the University of York; Ulinka Rublack, Professor of Early Modern European History at the University of Cambridge and Fellow of St John's College, Cambridge; Adam Mosley, associate professor in the Department of History at Swansea University
12 January 2017	Nietzsche's Genealogy of Morality	Stephen Mulhall, Professor of Philosophy and a Fellow and Tutor at New College, Oxford; Fiona Hughes, Senior Lecturer in Philosophy at the University of Essex; Keith Ansell-Pearson, Professor of Philosophy at the University of Warwick
19 January 2017	Mary, Queen of Scots	David Forsyth, Principal Curator, Scottish Medieval-Early Modern Collections at National Museums Scotland; Anna Groundwater, Teaching Fellow in Historical Skills and Methods at the University of Edinburgh; John Guy, Fellow of Clare College, University of Cambridge
26 January 2017	Parasitism	Steve Jones, Emeritus Professor of Genetics at University College, London; Wendy Gibson, Professor of Protozoology at the University of Bristol; Kayla King, associate professor in the Department of Zoology at the University of Oxford
2 February 2017	Hannah Arendt	Lyndsey Stonebridge, Professor of Modern Literature and History at the University of East Anglia; Frisbee Sheffield, Lecturer in Philosophy at Girton College, University of Cambridge; Robert Eaglestone, Professor of English at Royal Holloway, University of London
9 February 2017	John Clare	Jonathan Bate, Professor of English Literature at the Worcester College, Oxford University; Mina Gorji, Senior Lecturer in the English Faculty and fellow of Pembroke College, Cambridge; Simon Kövesi, Professor of English Literature at Oxford Brookes University
16 February 2017	Maths in the Early Islamic World	Colva Roney-Dougal, Reader in Pure Mathematics at the University of St Andrews; Peter Pormann, Professor of Classics & Graeco-Arabic Studies at the University of Manchester; Jim Al-Khalili, Professor of Physics at the University of Surrey
23 February 2017	Seneca the Younger	Mary Beard, Professor of Classics at the University of Cambridge; Catharine Edwards, Professor of Classics and Ancient History at Birkbeck, University of London; Alessandro Schiesaro, Professor of Classics at the University of Manchester
2 March 2017	The Kuiper belt	Carolin Crawford, Public Astronomer at the Institute of Astronomy and Fellow of Emmanuel College, Cambridge; Monica Grady, Professor of Planetary and Space Sciences at the Open University; Stephen Lowry, Reader in Planetary and Space Sciences, University of Kent
9 March 2017	North and South	Sally Shuttleworth, Professor of English Literature at the University of Oxford; Dinah Birch, Pro-vice Chancellor for Research and Professor of English Literature at the University of Liverpool; Jenny Uglow, Biographer of Elizabeth Gaskell
16 March 2017	The Paleocene-Eocene Thermal Maximum	Dame Jane Francis, Professor of Palaeoclimatology at the British Antarctic Survey; Mark Maslin, Professor of Palaeoclimatology at University College London; Tracy Aze, Lecturer in Marine Micropaleontology at the University of Leeds
23 March 2017	The Battle of Salamis	Lloyd Llewellyn-Jones, Professor in Ancient History at Cardiff University; Lindsay Allen, Lecturer in Greek and Near Eastern History, King's College London; Paul Cartledge, Emeritus Professor of Greek Culture and AG Leventis Senior Research Fellow at Clare College, Cambridge
30 March 2017	Hokusai	Angus Lockyer, Lecturer in Japanese History at SOAS University of London; Rosina Buckland, Senior Curator of Japanese Collections at the National Museum of Scotland; Ellis Tinios, Honorary Lecturer in the School of History, University of Leeds
6 April 2017	Pauli's exclusion principle	Frank Close, Fellow Emeritus at Exeter College, Oxford; Michela Massimi, Professor of Philosophy of Science at the University of Edinburgh; Graham Farmelo, Bye-Fellow of Churchill College, Cambridge
13 April 2017	Rosa Luxemburg	Jacqueline Rose, Co-Director of the Birkbeck Institute for the Humanities, Birkbeck, University of London; Mark Jones, Irish Research Council fellow at the Centre for War Studies, University College Dublin; Nadine Rossol, Senior lecturer in Modern European History at the University of Essex
20 April 2017	Roger Bacon	Jack Cunningham, Academic Coordinator for Theology at Bishop Grosseteste University, Lincoln; Amanda Power, associate professor of Medieval History at the University of Oxford; Elly Truitt, associate professor of Medieval History at Bryn Mawr College
27 April 2017	The Egyptian Book of the Dead	John Taylor, Curator at the Department of Ancient Egypt and Sudan at the British Museum; Kate Spence, Senior Lecturer in Egyptian Archaeology at Cambridge University and Fellow of Emmanuel College; Richard Parkinson, Professor of Egyptology at the University of Oxford and Fellow of the Queen's College
4 May 2017	The Battle of Lincoln 1217	Louise Wilkinson, Professor of Medieval History at Canterbury Christ Church University; Stephen Church, Professor of Medieval History at the University of East Anglia; Thomas Asbridge, Reader in Medieval History at Queen Mary College, University of London
11 May 2017	Emily Dickinson	Fiona Green, Senior Lecturer in English at the University of Cambridge and a Fellow of Jesus College; Linda Freedman, Lecturer in English and American Literature at University College London; Paraic Finnerty, Reader in English and American Literature at the University of Portsmouth
18 May 2017	Louis Pasteur	Andrew Mendelsohn, Reader in the School of History at Queen Mary, University of London; Anne Hardy, Honorary Professor at the Centre for History in Public Health at the London School of Hygiene and Tropical Medicine; Michael Worboys, Emeritus Professor in the History of Science, Technology and Medicine at the University of Manchester
25 May 2017	Purgatory	Laura Ashe, associate professor of English and fellow of Worcester College at the University of Oxford; Matthew Treherne, Professor of Italian Literature at the University of Leeds; Helen Foxhall Forbes, associate professor of Early Medieval History at Durham University
1 June 2017	Enzymes	Nigel Richards, Professor of Biological Chemistry at Cardiff University; Sarah Barry, Lecturer in Chemical Biology at King's College London; Jim Naismith, Director of the Research Complex at Harwell. Bishop Wardlaw Professor of Chemical Biology at the University of St Andrews, Professor of Structural Biology at the University of Oxford
8 June 2017	Christine de Pizan	Helen Swift, Associate Professor of Medieval French at the University of Oxford and Fellow of St Hilda's College; Miranda Griffin, Lecturer in French and Fellow of St Catharine's College, Cambridge; Marilynn Desmond, Distinguished Professor of English and Comparative Literature at Binghamton University
15 June 2017	The American Populists	Lawrence Goldman, Professor of History at the Institute of Historical Research, University of London; Mara Keire, Lecturer in US History at the University of Oxford; Christopher Phelps, Associate Professor of American Studies at the University of Nottingham
22 June 2017	Eugene Onegin	Andrew Kahn, Professor of Russian Literature at the University of Oxford and Fellow of St Edmund Hall; Emily Finer, Lecturer in Russian and Comparative Literature at the University of St Andrews; Simon Dixon, The Sir Bernard Pares Professor of Russian History at University College London
29 June 2017	Plato's Republic	Angie Hobbs, Professor of the Public Understanding of Philosophy at the University of Sheffield; M.M. McCabe, Professor of Ancient Philosophy Emerita at King's College London; James Warren, Fellow of Corpus Christi College and a Reader in Ancient Philosophy at the University of Cambridge
6 July 2017	Bird migration	Barbara Helm, Reader at the Institute of Biodiversity, Animal Health and Comparative Medicine at the University of Glasgow; Tim Guilford, Professor of Animal Behaviour and Tutorial Fellow of Zoology at Merton College, Oxford; Richard Holland, Senior Lecturer in Animal Cognition at Bangor University

=== 2017–2018 ===
Broadcast date Listen again	Title	Contributors and positions held at time of broadcast
21 September 2017	Kant's Categorical Imperative	Alison Hills, Professor of Philosophy at St John's College, Oxford; David S. Oderberg, Professor of Philosophy at the University of Reading; John Callanan, Senior Lecturer in Philosophy at King's College London
28 September 2017	Wuthering Heights	Karen O'Brien, Professor of English Literature at the University of Oxford; John Bowen, Professor of Nineteenth Century Literature at the University of York; Alexandra Lewis, Lecturer in English Literature at the University of Aberdeen
5 October 2017	Constantine the Great	Christopher Kelly, Professor of Classics and Ancient History at the University of Cambridge and President of Corpus Christi College; Lucy Grig, Senior Lecturer in Roman History at the University of Edinburgh; Greg Woolf, Director of the Institute of Classical Studies, University of London
12 October 2017	Aphra Behn	Janet Todd, Former President of Lucy Cavendish College, Cambridge University; Ros Ballaster, Professor of 18th Century Literature at Mansfield College, University of Oxford; Claire Bowditch, Post-doctoral Research Associate in English and Drama at Loughborough University
19 October 2017	The Congress of Vienna	Tim Blanning, Emeritus Professor of Modern European History at the University of Cambridge; Kathleen Burk, Professor Emerita of Modern and Contemporary History at University College London; John Bew, Professor in History and Foreign Policy at the War Studies Department at King's College London
26 October 2017	Feathered dinosaurs	Mike Benton, Professor of Vertebrate Palaeontology at the University of Bristol; Steve Brusatte, Reader and Chancellor's Fellow in Vertebrate Palaeontology at the University of Edinburgh; Maria McNamara, Senior Lecturer in Geology at University College Cork
2 November 2017	Picasso's Guernica	Mary Vincent, Professor of Modern European History at the University of Sheffield; Gijs van Hensbergen, Historian of Spanish Art and Fellow of the LSE Cañada Blanch Centre for Contemporary Spanish Studies; Dacia Viejo Rose, Lecturer in Heritage in the Department of Archaeology at the University of Cambridge, Fellow of Selwyn College
9 November 2017	The Picts	Katherine Forsyth, Reader in the Department of Celtic and Gaelic at the University of Glasgow; Alex Woolf, Senior Lecturer in Dark Age Studies at the University of St Andrews; Gordon Noble, Reader in Archaeology at the University of Aberdeen
16 November 2017	Germaine de Staël	Catriona Seth, Marshal Foch Professor of French Literature at the University of Oxford; Alison Finch, Professor Emerita of French Literature at the University of Cambridge; Katherine Astbury, Associate Professor and Reader in French Studies at the University of Warwick
23 November 2017	Thebes	Edith Hall, Professor of Classics at King's College London; Samuel Gartland, Lecturer in Ancient History at Corpus Christi College, University of Oxford; Paul Cartledge, Emeritus Professor of Greek Culture and A. G. Leventis Senior Research Fellow at Clare College, University of Cambridge
30 November 2017	Carl Friedrich Gauss	Marcus du Sautoy, Professor of Mathematics and Simonyi Professor for the Public Understanding of Science at the University of Oxford; Colva Roney-Dougal, Reader in Pure Mathematics at the University of St Andrews; Nick Evans, Professor of Theoretical Physics at the University of Southampton
7 December 2017	Moby Dick	Bridget Bennett, Professor of American Literature and Culture at the University of Leeds; Katie McGettigan, Lecturer in American Literature at Royal Holloway, University of London; Graham Thompson, Associate Professor of American Studies at the University of Nottingham
14 December 2017	Thomas Becket	Laura Ashe, Associate Professor of English at Worcester College, University of Oxford; Michael Staunton, Associate Professor in History at University College Dublin; Danica Summerlin, Lecturer in Medieval History at the University of Sheffield
21 December 2017	Beethoven	Laura Tunbridge, Professor of Music and Henfrey Fellow, St Catherine's College, Oxford; John Deathridge, Emeritus King Edward Professor of Music at King's College London; Erica Buurman, Senior Lecturer in Music, Canterbury Christ Church University
28 December 2017	Hamlet	Jonathan Bate, Provost of Worcester College, Oxford; Carol Rutter, Professor of Shakespeare and Performance Studies at the University of Warwick; Sonia Massai, Professor of Shakespeare Studies at King's College London
11 January 2018	The Siege of Malta, 1565	Helen Nicholson, Professor of Medieval History at Cardiff University; Diarmaid MacCulloch, Professor of the History of the Church at the University of Oxford; Kate Fleet, Director of the Skilliter Centre for Ottoman Studies and Fellow of Newnham College, Cambridge
18 January 2018	Anna Akhmatova	Katharine Hodgson, Professor in Russian at the University of Exeter; Alexandra Harrington, Reader in Russian Studies at Durham University; Michael Basker, Professor of Russian Literature and Dean of Arts at the University of Bristol
25 January 2018	Cicero	Melissa Lane, Professor of Politics at Princeton University. Carlyle Lecturer at the University of Oxford; Catherine Steel, Professor of Classics at the University of Glasgow; Valentina Arena, Reader in Roman History at University College London
1 February 2018	Cephalopods	Louise Allcock, Lecturer in Zoology at the National University of Ireland, Galway; Paul Rodhouse, Emeritus Fellow of the British Antarctic Survey; Jonathan Ablett, Senior Curator of Molluscs at the Natural History Museum
8 February 2018	Frederick Douglass	Celeste-Marie Bernier, Professor of Black Studies in the English Department at the University of Edinburgh; Karen Salt, Assistant Professor in Transnational American Studies at the University of Nottingham; Nicholas Guyatt, Reader in North American History at the University of Cambridge
15 February 2018	Fungi	Lynne Boddy, Professor of Fungal Ecology at Cardiff University; Sarah Gurr, Professor of Food Security in the Biosciences Department at the University of Exeter; David Johnson, N8 Chair in Microbial Ecology at the University of Manchester
22 February 2018	Rosalind Franklin	Patricia Fara, president of the British Society for the History of Science; Jim Naismith, Interim lead of the Rosalind Franklin Institute, Director of the Research Complex at Harwell and Professor at the University of Oxford; Judith Howard, Professor of Chemistry at Durham University
1 March 2018	Sun Tzu and The Art of War	Hilde de Weerdt, Professor of Chinese History at Leiden University; Tim Barrett, Professor Emeritus of East Asian History at SOAS, University of London; Imre Galambos, Reader in Chinese Studies at the University of Cambridge
8 March 2018	The Highland Clearances	Tom Devine, Professor Emeritus of Scottish History at the University of Edinburgh; Marjory Harper, Professor of History at the University of Aberdeen and Visiting Professor at the University of the Highlands and Islands; Murray Pittock, Bradley Professor of English Literature and Pro Vice Principal at the University of Glasgow
15 March 2018	Augustine's Confessions	Kate Cooper, Professor of History at the University of London and Head of History at Royal Holloway; Morwenna Ludlow, Professor of Christian History and Theology at the University of Exeter; Martin Palmer, Visiting Professor in Religion, History and Nature at the University of Winchester
22 March 2018	Tocqueville: Democracy in America	Robert Gildea, Professor of Modern History at the University of Oxford; Susan-Mary Grant, Professor of American History at Newcastle University; Jeremy Jennings, Professor of Political Theory and Head of the School of Politics & Economics at King's College London
5 April 2018	Roman Slavery	Neville Morley, Professor of Classics and Ancient History at the University of Exeter; Ulrike Roth, Senior Lecturer in Ancient History at the University of Edinburgh; Myles Lavan, Senior lecturer in Ancient History at the University of St Andrews
12 April 2018	George and Robert Stephenson	Michael Bailey, Railway historian and editor of the most recent biography of Robert Stephenson; Julia Elton, Past President of the Newcomen Society for the History of Engineering and Technology; Colin Divall, Professor Emeritus of Railway Studies at the University of York
19 April 2018	Middlemarch	Rosemary Ashton, Emeritus Quain Professor of English Language and Literature at University College London; Kathryn Hughes, Professor of Life Writing at the University of East Anglia; John Bowen, Professor of Nineteenth-Century Literature at the University of York
26 April 2018	The Proton	Frank Close, Professor Emeritus of Physics at the University of Oxford; Helen Heath, Reader in Physics at the University of Bristol; Simon Jolly, Lecturer in High Energy Physics at University College London
3 May 2018	The Almoravid Empire	Amira Bennison, Professor in the History and Culture of the Maghreb at the University of Cambridge; Nicola Clarke, Lecturer in the History of the Islamic World at Newcastle University; Hugh Kennedy, Professor of Arabic at SOAS, University of London
10 May 2018	The Mabinogion	Sioned Davies, Professor in the School of Welsh at Cardiff University; Helen Fulton, Professor of Medieval Literature at the University of Bristol; Juliette Wood, Associate Lecturer in the School of Welsh at Cardiff University
17 May 2018	The Emancipation of the Serfs	Sarah Hudspith, Associate Professor in Russian at the University of Leeds; Simon Dixon, The Sir Bernard Pares Professor of Russian History at University College London; Shane O'Rourke, Senior Lecturer in History at the University of York
24 May 2018	Margaret of Anjou	Katherine Lewis, Senior Lecturer in Medieval History at the University of Huddersfield; James Ross, Reader in Late Medieval History at the University of Winchester; Joanna Laynesmith, Visiting Research Fellow at the University of Reading
31 May 2018	Henrik Ibsen	Tore Rem, Professor of English Literature at the University of Oslo; Kirsten Shepherd-Barr, Professor of English and Theatre Studies and Tutorial Fellow, St Catherine's College at the University of Oxford; Dinah Birch, Professor of English Literature and Pro-Vice Chancellor for Cultural Engagement at the University of Liverpool
7 June 2018	Persepolis	Lloyd Llewellyn-Jones, Professor of Ancient History at Cardiff University; Vesta Sarkhosh Curtis, Curator of Middle Eastern Coins at the British Museum; Lindsay Allen, Lecturer in Greek and Near Eastern History at King's College London
14 June 2018	Montesquieu	Richard Bourke, Professor in the History of Political Thought at Queen Mary, University of London; Rachel Hammersley, Senior Lecturer in Intellectual History at Newcastle University; Richard Whatmore, Professor of Modern History at the University of St Andrews and Director of the St Andrews Institute of Intellectual History
21 June 2018	Echolocation	Kate Jones, Professor of Ecology and Biodiversity at University College London; Gareth Jones, Professor of Biological Sciences at the University of Bristol; Dean Waters, Lecturer in the Environment Department at the University of York
28 June 2018	The Mexican-American War	Frank Cogliano, Professor of American History at the University of Edinburgh; Jacqueline Fear-Segal, Professor of American and Indigenous Histories at the University of East Anglia; Thomas Rath, Lecturer in Latin American History at University College London
5 July 2018	William Morris	Ingrid Hanson, Lecturer in 18th and 19th Century Literature at the University of Manchester; Marcus Waithe, University Senior Lecturer in English Literature at the University of Cambridge and Fellow of Magdalene College; Jane Thomas, Professor of Victorian and Early 20th Century Literature at the University of Hull

=== 2018–2019 ===
Broadcast date Listen again	Title	Contributors and positions held at time of broadcast
13 September 2018	The Iliad	Edith Hall, Professor of Classics at King's College London; Barbara Graziosi, Associate Professor of Medieval History at Princeton University; Paul Cartledge, A.G. Leventis Senior Research Fellow and Emeritus Professor of Greek Culture at Clare College, Cambridge
20 September 2018	Automata	Simon Schaffer, Professor of the History of Science at Cambridge University; Elly Truitt, Professor of Classics at Bryn Mawr College; Franziska Kohlt, Doctoral Researcher in English Literature and the History of Science at the University of Oxford
27 September 2018	Dietrich Bonhoeffer	Stephen Plant, Dean and Runcie Fellow at Trinity Hall at the University of Cambridge; Eleanor McLaughlin, Lecturer in Theology and Ethics at the University of Winchester and Lecturer in Ethics at Regent's Park College at the University of Oxford; Tom Greggs, Marischal Chair of Divinity at the University of Aberdeen
4 October 2018	Edith Wharton	Hermione Lee, Biographer, former President of Wolfson College, Oxford; Bridget Bennett, Professor of American Literature and Culture at the University of Leeds; Laura Rattray, Reader in North American Literature at the University of Glasgow
11 October 2018	Is Shakespeare History? The Plantagenets	Emma Smith, Professor of Shakespeare Studies at Hertford College, University of Oxford; Gordon McMullan, Professor of English at King's College London and Director of the London Shakespeare Centre; Katherine Lewis, Senior Lecturer in Medieval History at the University of Huddersfield
18 October 2018	Is Shakespeare History? The Romans	Jonathan Bate, Provost of Worcester College, University of Oxford; Catherine Steel, Professor of Classics and Dean of Research in the College of Arts at the University of Glasgow; Patrick Gray, Associate Professor of English Studies at Durham University
25 October 2018	The Fable of the Bees	David Wootton, Anniversary Professor of History at the University of York; Helen Paul, Lecturer in Economics and Economic History at the University of Southampton; John Callanan, Senior Lecturer in Philosophy at King's College London
1 November 2018	Free Radicals	Nick Lane, Professor of Evolutionary Biochemistry at University College London; Anna Croft, Associate Professor at the Department of Chemical and Environmental Engineering at the University of Nottingham; Mike Murphy, Professor of Mitochondrial Redox Biology at Cambridge University
8 November 2018	Marie Antoinette	Catriona Seth, Marshal Foch Professor of French Literature at the University of Oxford; Katherine Astbury, Professor of French Studies at the University of Warwick; David McCallam, Reader in French Eighteenth-Century Studies at the University of Sheffield
15 November 2018	Horace	Emily Gowers, Professor of Latin Literature at the University of Cambridge and Fellow of St John's College, Cambridge; William Fitzgerald, Professor of Latin Language and Literature at King's College London; Ellen O'Gorman, Senior Lecturer in Classics at the University of Bristol
22 November 2018	Hope	Beatrice Han-Pile, Professor of Philosophy at the University of Essex; Robert Stern, Professor of Philosophy at the University of Sheffield; Judith Wolfe, Professor of Philosophical Theology at the University of St Andrews
29 November 2018	The Long March	Rana Mitter, Professor of the History and Politics of Modern China and Fellow of St Cross College, Oxford; Sun Shuyun, historian, writer and film maker; Julia Lovell, Professor in Modern Chinese History and Literature at Birkbeck, University of London
6 December 2018	The Thirty Years War	Peter Wilson, Chichele Professor of the History of War at the University of Oxford; Ulinka Rublack, Professor of Early Modern European History at the University of Cambridge and Fellow of St John's College, Cambridge; Toby Osborne, Associate Professor in History at Durham University
13 December 2018	Sir Gawain and the Green Knight	Laura Ashe, Professor of English Literature at Worcester College, University of Oxford; Ad Putter, Professor of Medieval English Literature at the University of Bristol; Simon Armitage, Poet and Professor of Poetry at the Universities of Leeds and Oxford
20 December 2018	The Poor Laws	Emma Griffin, Professor of Modern British History at the University of East Anglia; Samantha Shave, Lecturer in Social Policy at the University of Lincoln; Steven King, Professor of Economic and Social History at the University of Leicester
27 December 2018	Venus	Carolin Crawford, Public Astronomer at the Institute of Astronomy and Fellow of Emmanuel College, Cambridge; Colin Wilson, Senior Research Fellow in Planetary Science at the University of Oxford; Andrew Coates, Professor of Physics at Mullard Space Science Laboratory, University College London
10 January 2019	Papal Infallibility	Tom O'Loughlin, Professor of Historical Theology at the University of Nottingham; Rebecca Rist, Professor in Medieval History at the University of Reading; Miles Pattenden, Departmental Lecturer in Early Modern History at the University of Oxford
17 January 2019	Samuel Beckett	Steven Connor, Professor of English at the University of Cambridge; Laura Salisbury, Professor of Modern Literature at the University of Exeter; Mark Nixon, Associate Professor in Modern Literature at the University of Reading and co-director of the Beckett International Foundation
24 January 2019	Emmy Noether	Colva Roney-Dougal, Professor of Pure Mathematics at the University of St Andrews; David Berman, Professor in Theoretical Physics at Queen Mary, University of London; Elizabeth Mansfield, Professor of Mathematics at the University of Kent
31 January 2019	Owain Glyndŵr	Huw Pryce, Professor of Welsh History at Bangor University; Helen Fulton, Professor of Medieval Literature at the University of Bristol; Chris Given-Wilson, Emeritus Professor of Medieval History at the University of St Andrews
7 February 2019	Aristotle's biology	Armand Leroi, Professor of Evolutionary Development Biology at Imperial College London; Myrto Hatzimichali, Lecturer in Classics at the University of Cambridge; Sophia Connell, Lecturer in Philosophy at Birkbeck, University of London
14 February 2019	Judith beheading Holofernes	Susan Foister, Curator of Early Netherlandish, German and British Painting at the National Gallery; John Gash, Senior Lecturer in History of Art at the University of Aberdeen; Ela Nutu Hall, Research Associate at the Sheffield Institute for Interdisciplinary Biblical Studies, at the University of Sheffield
21 February 2019	Pheromones	Tristram Wyatt, Senior Research Fellow at the Department of Zoology at the University of Oxford; Jane Hurst, William Prescott Professor of Animal Science at the University of Liverpool; Francis Ratnieks, Professor of Apiculture and Head of the Laboratory of Apiculture and Social Insects at the University of Sussex
28 February 2019	Antarah ibn Shaddad	James Montgomery, Sir Thomas Adams's Professor of Arabic at the University of Cambridge; Marlé Hammond, Senior Lecturer in Arabic Popular Literature and Culture at SOAS, University of London; Harry Munt, Lecturer in Medieval History at the University of York
7 March 2019	William Cecil	Diarmaid MacCulloch, Professor of the History of the Church at the University of Oxford; Susan Doran, Professor of Early Modern British History at the University of Oxford; John Guy, Fellow of Clare College, University of Cambridge
14 March 2019	Authenticity	Sarah Richmond, Associate Professor in Philosophy at University College London; Denis McManus, Professor of Philosophy at the University of Southampton; Irene McMullin, Senior Lecturer in Philosophy at the University of Essex
21 March 2019	Gerard Manley Hopkins	Catherine Phillips, R J Owens Fellow in English at Downing College, University of Cambridge; Jane Wright, Senior Lecturer in English Literature at the University of Bristol; Martin Dubois, Assistant Professor in Nineteenth Century Literature at Durham University
28 March 2019	The Danelaw	Judith Jesch, Professor of Viking Studies at the University of Nottingham; John Hines, Professor of Archaeology at Cardiff University; Jane Kershaw, ERC Principal Investigator in Archaeology at the University of Oxford
4 April 2019	The Great Irish Famine	Cormac O'Grada, Professor Emeritus in the School of Economics at University College Dublin; Niamh Gallagher, University Lecturer in Modern British and Irish History at the University of Cambridge; Enda Delaney, Professor of Modern History and School Director of Research at the University of Edinburgh
11 April 2019	The Evolution of Teeth	Gareth Fraser, Assistant Professor in Biology at the University of Florida; Zerina Johanson, Merit Researcher in the Department of Earth Sciences at the Natural History Museum; Philip Donoghue, Professor of Palaeobiology at the University of Bristol
18 April 2019	A Midsummer Night's Dream	Helen Hackett, Professor of English Literature and Leverhulme Research Fellow at University College London; Tom Healy, Professor of Renaissance Studies at the University of Sussex; Alison Findlay, Professor of Renaissance Drama at Lancaster University and chair of the British Shakespeare Association
25 April 2019	Nero	Maria Wyke, Professor of Latin at University College London; Matthew Nicholls, Fellow and Senior Tutor at St John's College, Oxford; Shushma Malik, Lecturer in Classics at the University of Roehampton
2 May 2019	The Gordon Riots	Ian Haywood, Professor of English at the University of Roehampton; Catriona Kennedy, Senior Lecturer in Modern British and Irish History and Director of the Centre for Eighteenth Century Studies at the University of York; Mark Knights, Professor of History at the University of Warwick
9 May 2019	Bergson and Time	Keith Ansell-Pearson, Professor of Philosophy at the University of Warwick; Emily Thomas, Assistant Professor in Philosophy at Durham University; Mark Sinclair, Reader in Philosophy at the University of Roehampton
16 May 2019	Frankenstein	Karen O'Brien, Professor of English Literature at the University of Oxford; Michael Rossington, Professor of Romantic Literature at Newcastle University; Jane Thomas, Professor of Victorian and Early 20th Century Literature at the University of Hull
23 May 2019	Kinetic Theory	Steven Bramwell, Professor of Physics at University College London; Isobel Falconer, Reader in History of Mathematics at the University of St Andrews; Ted Forgan, Emeritus Professor of Physics at the University of Birmingham
30 May 2019	President Ulysses S Grant	Erik Mathisen, Lecturer in US History at the University of Kent; Susan-Mary Grant, Professor of American History at Newcastle University; Robert Cook, Professor of American History at the University of Sussex
6 June 2019	Sir Thomas Browne	Claire Preston, Professor of Renaissance Literature at Queen Mary, University of London; Jessica Wolfe, Professor of English and Comparative Literature at the University of North Carolina at Chapel Hill; Kevin Killeen, Professor of English at the University of York
13 June 2019	The Inca	Frank Meddens, Visiting Scholar at the University of Reading; Helen Cowie, Senior Lecturer in History at the University of York; Bill Sillar, Senior Lecturer at the Institute of Archaeology at University College London
20 June 2019	The Mytilenaean Debate	Angela Hobbs, Professor of the Public Understanding of Philosophy at the University of Sheffield; Lisa Irene Hau, Senior Lecturer in Classics at the University of Glasgow; Paul Cartledge, Emeritus AG Leventis Professor of Greek Culture, University of Cambridge and Senior Research Fellow of Clare College
27 June 2019	Doggerland	Vincent Gaffney, Anniversary Professor of Landscape Archaeology at the University of Bradford; Carol Cotterill, Marine Geoscientist at the British Geological Survey; Rachel Bynoe, Lecturer in Archaeology at the University of Southampton
4 July 2019	Lorca	Maria Delgado, Professor of Creative Arts at the Royal Central of Speech and Drama, University of London; Federico Bonaddio, Reader in Modern Spanish at King's College London; Sarah Wright, Professor of Hispanic Studies and Screen Arts at Royal Holloway, University of London

=== 2019–2020 ===
Broadcast date Listen again	Title	Contributors and positions held at time of broadcast
19 September 2019	Napoleon's Retreat from Moscow	Janet Hartley, Professor emeritus of International History, LSE; Michael Rowe, Reader in European History, King's College London; Michael Rapport, Reader in Modern European History, University of Glasgow
26 September 2019	The Rapture	Elizabeth Phillips, research Fellow at the Margaret Beaufort Institute at the University of Cambridge and Honorary Fellow in the Department of Theology and Religion at Durham University; Crawford Gribben, professor of Early Modern British History at Queen's University Belfast; Nicholas Guyatt, reader in North American History at the University of Cambridge
3 October 2019	Dorothy Hodgkin	Georgina Ferry, science writer and biographer of Dorothy Hodgkin; Judith Howard, professor of Chemistry at Durham University; Patricia Fara, fellow of Clare College, Cambridge
10 October 2019	Rousseau on Education	Richard Whatmore, Professor of Modern History at the University of St Andrews and Co-Director of the St Andrews Institute of Intellectual History; Caroline Warman, Professor of French Literature and Thought at Jesus College, Oxford; Denis McManus, Professor of Philosophy at the University of Southampton
17 October 2019	The Time Machine	Simon Schaffer, Professor of History of Science at Cambridge University; Amanda Rees, Historian of science at the University of York; Simon James, Professor in the Department of English Studies at Durham University
24 October 2019	Robert Burns	Robert Crawford, Professor of Modern Scottish Literature and Bishop Wardlaw Professor of Poetry at the University of St Andrews; Fiona Stafford, Professor of English at the University of Oxford; Murray Pittock, Bradley Professor of English Literature and Pro Vice Principal at the University of Glasgow
31 October 2019	Hybrids	Sandra Knapp, Tropical Botanist at the Natural History Museum; Nicola Nadeau, Lecturer in Evolutionary Biology at the University of Sheffield; Steve Jones, Senior Research Fellow in Genetics at University College London
7 November 2019	The Treaty of Limerick	Jane Ohlmeyer, Chair of the Irish Research Council and Erasmus Smith's Professor of Modern History at Trinity College Dublin; Clare Jackson, Member of the History Faculty at the University of Cambridge and Senior Tutor of Trinity Hall; Thomas O'Connor, Professor of History at Maynooth University
14 November 2019	Crime and Punishment	Sarah Huspith, Associate Professor in Russian at the University of Leeds; Oliver Ready, Lecturer in Russian at the University of Oxford, Research Fellow at St Antony's College and a translator of this novel; Sarah Young, Associate Professor in Russian at the School of Slavonic and East European Studies, University College London
21 November 2019	Melisende, Queen of Jerusalem	Natasha Hodgson, Senior Lecturer in Medieval History and Director of the Centre for the Study of Religion and Conflict at Nottingham Trent University; Katherine Lewis, Senior Lecturer in History at the University of Huddersfield; Danielle Park, Visiting Lecturer at Royal Holloway, University of London
28 November 2019	Li Shizhen	Craig Clunas, Professor Emeritus in the History of Art at the University of Oxford; Anne Gerritsen, Professor in History at the University of Warwick; Roel Sterckx, Joseph Needham Professor of Chinese History at the University of Cambridge
5 December 2019	Lawrence of Arabia	Hussein Omar, Lecturer in Modern Global History, University College Dublin; Catriona Pennell, Associate Professor of Modern History and Memory Studies, University of Exeter; Neil Faulkner, Director of Military History Live and Editor of the magazine Military History Matters
12 December 2019	Coffee	Judith Hawley, Professor of 18th Century Literature at Royal Holloway, University of London; Markman Ellis, Professor of 18th Century Studies at Queen Mary University of London; Jonathan Morris, Professor in Modern History at the University of Hertfordshire
19 December 2019	Auden	Mark Ford, Poet and Professor, English at University College London; Janet Montefiore, Professor Emerita of 20th Century English Literature at the University of Kent; Jeremy Noel-Tod, Senior Lecturer in Literature and Creative Writing at the University of East Anglia
26 December 2019	Tutankhamun	Elizabeth Frood, Associate Professor of Egyptology, Director of the Griffith Institute and Fellow of St Cross at the University of Oxford; Christina Riggs, Professor of the History of Visual Culture at Durham University and a Fellow of All Souls College, Oxford; John Taylor, Curator at the Department of Egypt and Sudan at the British Museum
9 January 2020	Catullus	Gail Trimble, Brown Fellow and Tutor in Classics at Trinity College at the University of Oxford; Simon Smith, Reader in Creative Writing at the University of Kent, poet and translator of Catullus; Maria Wyke, Professor of Latin at University College London
16 January 2020	The Siege of Paris (1870-71)	Karine Varley, Lecturer in French and European History at the University of Strathclyde; Robert Gildea, Professor of Modern History at the University of Oxford; Julia Nicholls, Lecturer in French and European Studies at King's College London
23 January 2020	Solar Wind	Andrew Coates, Professor of Physics and Deputy Director in charge of the Solar System at the Mullard Space Science Laboratory, University College London; Helen Mason, Reader in Solar Physics at the Department of Applied Mathematics and Theoretical Physics, University of Cambridge, Fellow at St Edmund's College, Cambridge; Tim Horbury, Professor of Physics at Imperial College London
30 January 2020	Alcuin	Joanna Story, Professor of Early Medieval History at the University of Leicester; Andy Orchard, Rawlinson and Bosworth Professor of Anglo-Saxon at the University of Oxford and a fellow of Pembroke College; Mary Garrison, Lecturer in History at the Centre for Medieval Studies at the University of York
6 February 2020	George Sand	Belinda Jack, Fellow and Tutor in French at Christ Church, University of Oxford; Angela Ryan, Senior Lecturer in French at University College Cork; Nigel Harkness, Pro-Vice-Chancellor for Humanities and Social Sciences and Professor of French at Newcastle University
13 February 2020	Battle of the Teutoburg Forest	Matthew Nicholls, Fellow and Senior Tutor St John's College, Oxford; Ellen O'Gorman, Senior Lecturer in Classics University of Bristol; Peter Heather, Professor of Medieval History King's College London
20 February 2020	The Valladolid Debate	Caroline Dodds Pennock, Senior Lecturer in International History at the University of Sheffield; John Edwards, Faculty Fellow in Spanish at the University of Oxford; Julia McClure, Lecturer in Late Medieval and Early Modern Global History at the University of Glasgow
27 February 2020	The Evolution of Horses	Alan Outram, Professor of Archaeological Science at the University of Exeter; Christine Janis, Honorary Professor in Palaeobiology at the University of Bristol and Professor Emerita in Ecology and Evolutionary Biology at Brown University; John Hutchinson, Professor in Evolutionary Biomechanics at the Royal Veterinary College
5 March 2020	Paul Dirac	Graham Farmelo, Biographer of Dirac and Fellow at Churchill College, Cambridge; Valerie Gibson, Professor of High Energy Physics at the University of Cambridge and Fellow of Trinity College; David Berman, Professor of Theoretical Physics at Queen Mary University of London
12 March 2020	The Covenanters	Roger Mason, Professor of Scottish History at the University of St Andrews; Laura Stewart, Professor of Early Modern British History at the University of York; Scott Spurlock, Professor of Scottish and Early Modern Christianities at the University of Glasgow

The 2019–2020 series was truncated because of the COVID-19 pandemic.

=== 2020–2021 ===
Broadcast date Listen again	Title	Contributors and positions held at time of broadcast
17 September 2020	Pericles	Edith Hall, Professor of Classics at King's College London; Paul Cartledge, AG Leventis Senior Research Fellow at Clare College, University of Cambridge; Peter Liddel, Senior Lecturer in Ancient History at the University of Manchester
24 September 2020	Cave Art	Alistair Pike, Professor of Archaeological Sciences at the University of Southampton; Chantal Conneller, Senior Lecturer in Early Pre-History at Newcastle University; Paul Pettitt, Professor of Palaeolithic Archaeology at Durham University
1 October 2020	Macbeth	Emma Smith, Professor of Shakespeare Studies at Hertford College, University of Oxford; Kiernan Ryan, Emeritus Professor of English Literature at Royal Holloway, University of London; David Schalkwyk, Professor of Shakespeare Studies and Director of Global Shakespeare at Queen Mary, University of London
8 October 2020	Deism	Richard Serjeantson, Fellow and Lecturer in History, Trinity College, University of Cambridge; Katie East, Lecturer in History with the School of History, Classics and Archaeology at Newcastle University; Thomas Ahnert, Professor of Intellectual History at the University of Edinburgh
15 October 2020	Alan Turing	Leslie Ann Goldberg, Professor of Computer Science and Fellow of St Edmund Hall, University of Oxford; Simon Schaffer, Professor of the History of Science at the University of Cambridge and Fellow of Darwin College; Andrew Hodges, Biographer of Turing and Emeritus Fellow of Wadham College, Oxford
22 October 2020	Maria Theresa	Catriona Seth, Marshal Foch Professor of French Literature at the University of Oxford; Martyn Rady, Professor of Central European History at University College London; Thomas Biskup, Lecturer in Early Modern History at the University of Hull
29 October 2020	Piers Plowman	Laura Ashe, Professor of English Literature at Worcester College, University of Oxford; Lawrence Warner, Professor of Medieval English at King's College London; Alastair Bennett, Lecturer in Medieval Literature at Royal Holloway, University of London
5 November 2020	Mary Astell	Hannah Dawson, Senior Lecturer in the History of Ideas at King's College London; Mark Goldie, Professor Emeritus of Intellectual History at the University of Cambridge; Teresa Bejan, Associate Professor of Political Theory at Oriel College, University of Oxford
12 November 2020	Albrecht Dürer	Susan Foister, Deputy Director and Curator of German Paintings at the National Gallery; Giulia Bartrum, Freelance art historian and Former Curator of German Prints and Drawings at the British Museum; Ulinka Rublack, Professor of Early Modern European History and Fellow of St John's College, Cambridge
26 November 2020	The Zong Massacre	Vincent Brown, Charles Warren Professor of American History and Professor of African and African American Studies at Harvard University; Bronwen Everill, Class of 1973 Lecturer in History and Fellow at Gonville & Caius College, University of Cambridge; Jake Subryan Richards, Assistant Professor of History at the London School of Economics
3 December 2020	Fernando Pessoa	Cláudia Pazos-Alonso, Professor of Portuguese and Gender Studies and Senior Research Fellow at Wadham College, University of Oxford; Juliet Perkins, Visiting Senior Research Fellow in Portuguese Studies at King's College London; Paulo de Medeiros, Professor of English and Comparative Literary Studies at the University of Warwick
10 December 2020	John Wesley and Methodism	Stephen Plant, Dean and Runcie Fellow at Trinity Hall at the University of Cambridge; Eryn White, Reader in Early Modern History at Aberystwyth University; William Gibson, Professor of Ecclesiastical History at Oxford Brookes University and Director of the Oxford Centre for Methodism and Church History
17 December 2020	The Cultural Revolution	Rana Mitter, Professor of the History and Politics of Modern China and Fellow of St Cross College, University of Oxford; Peidong Sun, Visiting Professor at the Center for International Studies at Sciences Po; Julia Lovell, Professor in Modern Chinese History and Literature at Birkbeck, University of London
31 December 2020	Eclipses	Carolin Crawford, Public Astronomer based at the Institute of Astronomy, University of Cambridge and a fellow of Emmanuel College; Frank Close, Emeritus Professor of Physics at the University of Oxford; Lucie Green, Professor of Physics and a Royal Society University Research Fellow at Mullard Space Science Laboratory at University College London
14 January 2021	The Great Gatsby	Sarah Churchwell, Professor of American Literature and Public Understanding of the Humanities at the University of London; Philip McGowan, Professor of American Literature at Queen's University Belfast; William Blazek, Associate Professor and Reader in American Literature at Liverpool Hope University
21 January 2021	The Plague of Justinian	John Haldon, Professor of Byzantine History and Hellenic Studies Emeritus at Princeton University; Rebecca Flemming, Senior Lecturer in Classics at the University of Cambridge; Greg Woolf, Director of the Institute of Classical Studies, University of London
28 January 2021	Saint Cuthbert	Jane Hawkes, Professor of Medieval Art History at the University of York; Sarah Foot, The Regius Professor of Ecclesiastical History at the University of Oxford and Canon of Christ Church Cathedral; John Hines, Professor of Archaeology at Cardiff University
4 February 2021	Emilie du Châtelet	Patricia Fara, Emeritus Fellow of Clare College, Cambridge; David Wootton, Anniversary Professor of History at the University of York; Judith Zinsser, Professor Emerita of History at Miami University of Ohio and biographer of Emilie du Châtelet
11 February 2021	The Rosetta Stone	Penelope Wilson, Associate Professor of Egyptian Archaeology at Durham University; Campbell Price, Curator of Egypt and Sudan at the Manchester Museum; Richard Bruce Parkinson, Professor of Egyptology and Fellow of The Queen's College, University of Oxford
18 February 2021	Medieval Pilgrimage	Miri Rubin, Professor of Medieval and Early Modern History at Queen Mary, University of London; Kathryn Rudy, Professor of Art History at the University of St Andrews; Anthony Bale, Professor of Medieval Studies and Dean of the School of Arts at Birkbeck, University of London
25 February 2021	Marcus Aurelius	Simon Goldhill, Professor of Greek Literature and Culture and Fellow of King's College, Cambridge; Angie Hobbs, Professor of the Public Understanding of Philosophy at the University of Sheffield; Catharine Edwards, Professor of Classics and Ancient History at Birkbeck, University of London
4 March 2021	The Rime of the Ancient Mariner	Jonathan Bate, Professor of Environmental Humanities at Arizona State University; Tom Mole, Professor of English Literature and Book History at the University of Edinburgh; Rosemary Ashton, Emeritus Quain Professor of English Language and Literature at University College London
11 March 2021	The Late Devonian Extinction	Jessica Whiteside, Associate Professor of Geochemistry in the Department of Ocean and Earth Science at the University of Southampton; David Bond, Professor of Geology at the University of Hull; Mike Benton, Professor of Vertebrate Paleontology at the School of Life Sciences, University of Bristol
18 March 2021	The Bacchae	Edith Hall, Professor of Classics at King's College London; Emily Wilson, Professor of Classical Studies at the University of Pennsylvania; Rosie Wyles, Lecturer in Classical History and Literature at the University of Kent
25 March 2021	David Ricardo	Matthew Watson, Professor of Political Economy at the University of Warwick; Helen Paul, Lecturer in Economics and Economic History at the University of Southampton; Richard Whatmore, Professor of Modern History at the University of St Andrews and Co-Director of the St Andrews Institute of Intellectual History
1 April 2021	The Russo-Japanese War	Simon Dixon, The Sir Bernard Pares Professor of Russian History at University College London; Naoko Shimazu, Professor of Humanities at Yale-NUS College; Oleg Benesch, Reader in Modern History at the University of York
8 April 2021	Pierre-Simon Laplace	Marcus du Sautoy, Simonyi Professor for the Public Understanding of Science and Professor of Mathematics at the University of Oxford; Timothy Gowers, Professor of Mathematics at the Collège de France; Colva Roney-Dougal, Professor of Pure Mathematics at the University of St Andrews
15 April 2021	Arianism	Judith Herrin, Professor of Late Antique and Byzantine Studies, Emeritus, at King's College London; Robin Whelan, Lecturer in Mediterranean History at the University of Liverpool; Martin Palmer, Visiting Professor in Religion, History and Nature at the University of Winchester
22 April 2021	The Franco-American Alliance 1778	Frank Cogliano, Professor of American History at the University of Edinburgh; Kathleen Burk, Professor Emerita of Modern and Contemporary History at University College London; Michael Rapport, Reader in Modern European History at the University of Glasgow
29 April 2021	Ovid	Maria Wyke, Professor of Latin at University College London; Gail Trimble, Brown Fellow and Tutor in Classics at Trinity College at the University of Oxford; Dunstan Lowe, Senior Lecturer in Latin Literature at the University of Kent
6 May 2021	The Second Barons' War	David Carpenter, Professor of Medieval History at King's College London; Louise Wilkinson, Professor of Medieval Studies at the University of Lincoln; Sophie Thérèse Ambler, Lecturer in Later Medieval British and European History at Lancaster University
13 May 2021	Longitude	Rebekah Higgitt, Principal Curator of Science at National Museums Scotland; Jim Bennett, Keeper Emeritus at the Science Museum; Simon Schaffer, Professor of History and Philosophy of Science at the University of Cambridge
20 May 2021	Journey to the West	Julia Lovell, Professor of Modern Chinese History and Literature at Birkbeck, University of London; Chiung-yun Evelyn Liu, Associate Research Fellow at the Institute of Chinese Literature and Philosophy, Academia Sinica, Taiwan; Craig Clunas, Professor Emeritus of the History of Art at Trinity College, University of Oxford
27 May 2021	The Interregnum	Clare Jackson, Senior Tutor at Trinity Hall, University of Cambridge; Micheál Ó Siochrú, Professor in Modern History at Trinity College Dublin; Laura Stewart, Professor in Early Modern History at the University of York
3 June 2021	Kant's Copernican Revolution	Fiona Hughes, Senior Lecturer in Philosophy at the University of Essex; Anil Gomes, Associate Professor and Fellow and Tutor in Philosophy at Trinity College, Oxford; John Callanan, Senior Lecturer in Philosophy at King's College London
10 June 2021	Booth's Life and Labour Survey	Emma Griffin, Professor of Modern British History at the University of East Anglia; Sarah Wise, Adjunct Professor at the University of California; Lawrence Goldman, Emeritus Fellow in History at St Peter's College, University of Oxford
17 June 2021	Edward Gibbon	David Womersley, The Thomas Wharton Professor of English Literature at St Catherine's College, University of Oxford; Charlotte Roberts, Lecturer in English at University College London; Karen O'Brien, Professor of English Literature at the University of Oxford
24 June 2021	Shakespeare's Sonnets	Hannah Crawforth, Senior Lecturer in Early Modern Literature at King's College London; Don Paterson, Poet and Professor of Poetry at the University of St Andrews; Emma Smith, Professor of Shakespeare Studies at Hertford College, Oxford

=== 2021–2022 ===
Broadcast date Listen again	Title	Contributors and positions held at time of broadcast
16 September 2021	The Evolution of Crocodiles	Anjali Goswami, Research Leader in Life Sciences and Dean of Postgraduate Education at the Natural History Museum; Philip Mannion, Lecturer in the Department of Earth Sciences at University College London; Stephen L. Brusatte, Professor of Palaeontology and Evolution at the University of Edinburgh
23 September 2021	Herodotus	Tom Harrison, Professor of Ancient History at the University of St Andrews; Esther Eidinow, Professor of Ancient History at the University of Bristol; Paul Cartledge, A. G. Leventis Senior Research Fellow at Clare College, University of Cambridge
30 September 2021	The Tenant of Wildfell Hall	Alexandra Lewis, Lecturer in English and Creative Writing at the University of Newcastle (Australia); Marianne Thormählen, Professor Emerita in English Studies, Lund University; John Bowen, Professor of Nineteenth Century Literature at the University of York
7 October 2021	The Manhattan Project	Bruce Cameron Reed, The Charles A. Dana Professor of Physics Emeritus at Alma College, Michigan; Cynthia Kelly, Founder and president of the Atomic Heritage Foundation; Frank Close, Emeritus Professor of Theoretical Physics at the University of Oxford and a Fellow of Exeter College, Oxford
14 October 2021	The Polish-Lithuanian Commonwealth	Robert I. Frost, The Burnett Fletcher Chair of History at the University of Aberdeen; Katarzyna Kosior, Lecturer in Early Modern History at Northumbria University; Norman Davies, Professor Emeritus in History and Honorary Fellow of St Antony's College, University of Oxford
21 October 2021	Iris Murdoch	Anil Gomes, Fellow and Tutor in Philosophy at Trinity College, University of Oxford; Anne Rowe, Visiting Professor at the University of Chichester and Emeritus Research Fellow with the Iris Murdoch Archive Project at Kingston University; Miles Leeson, Director of the Iris Murdoch Research Centre and Reader in English Literature at the University of Chichester
28 October 2021	Corals	Steve Jones, Senior Research Fellow in Genetics at University College London; Nicola Foster, Lecturer in Marine Biology at the University of Plymouth; Gareth Williams, Associate Professor in Marine Biology at Bangor University School of Ocean Sciences
4 November 2021	The Song of Roland	Laura Ashe, Professor of English Literature and Fellow in English at Worcester College, Oxford; Miranda Griffin, Assistant Professor of Medieval French at the University of Cambridge and Fellow of Murray Edwards College, Cambridge; Luke Sunderland, Professor in the School of Modern Languages and Cultures at Durham University
11 November 2021	William and Caroline Herschel	Monica Grady, Professor of Planetary and Space Sciences at the Open University; Carolin Crawford, Institute of Astronomy, Cambridge and an Emeritus Fellow of Emmanuel College, University of Cambridge; Jim Bennett, Keeper Emeritus at the Science Museum in London
18 November 2021	The Decadent Movement	Neil Sammells, Professor of English and Irish Literature and Deputy Vice Chancellor at Bath Spa University; Kate Hext, Senior Lecturer in English Literature at the University of Exeter; Alex Murray, Senior Lecturer in English at Queen's University Belfast
25 November 2021	Plato's Gorgias	Angie Hobbs, Professor of the Public Understanding of Philosophy at the University of Sheffield; Frisbee Sheffield, University Lecturer in Classics and Fellow of Downing College, Cambridge; Fiona Leigh, Associate Professor in the Department of Philosophy at University College London
2 December 2021	The Battle of Trafalgar	James Davey, Lecturer in Naval and Maritime History at the University of Exeter; Marianne Czisnik, Independent researcher on Nelson and editor of his letters to Lady Hamilton; Kenneth Johnson, Research Professor of National Security at Air University, Alabama
9 December 2021	The May Fourth Movement	Rana Mitter, Professor of the History and Politics of Modern China and Fellow of St Cross College, Oxford; Elisabeth Forster, Lecturer in Chinese History at the University of Southampton; Song-Chuan Chen, Associate Professor in History at the University of Warwick
16 December 2021	A Christmas Carol	Juliet John, Professor of English Literature and Dean of Arts and Social Sciences at City, University of London; Jon Mee, Professor of Eighteenth-Century Studies at the University of York; Dinah Birch, Pro-Vice-Chancellor for Cultural Engagement and Professor of English Literature at the University of Liverpool
23 December 2021	The Hittites	Claudia Glatz, Professor of Archaeology at the University of Glasgow; Ilgi Gercek, Assistant Professor of Ancient Near Eastern Languages and History at Bilkent University; Christoph Bachhuber, Lecturer in Archaeology at St John's College, Oxford
30 December 2021	Fritz Lang	Stella Bruzzi, Professor of Film and Dean of Arts and Humanities at University College London; Joe McElhaney, Professor of Film Studies at Hunter College, City University of New York; Iris Luppa, Senior Lecturer in Film Studies in the Division of Film and Media at London South Bank University
13 January 2022	Thomas Hardy's Poetry	Mark Ford, poet, and Professor of English and American Literature, University College London; Jane Thomas, Emeritus Professor of English at the University of Hull and Senior Visiting Research Fellow at the University of Leeds; Tim Armstrong, Professor of Modern English and American Literature at Royal Holloway, University of London
20 January 2022	The Gold Standard	Catherine Schenk, Professor of Economic and Social History at the University of Oxford; Helen Paul, Lecturer in Economics and Economic History at the University of Southampton; Matthias Morys, Senior Lecturer in Economic History at the University of York
27 January 2022	Colette	Diana Holmes, Professor of French at the University of Leeds; Michèle Roberts, Writer, novelist, poet and Emeritus Professor of Creative Writing at the University of East Anglia; Belinda Jack, Fellow and Tutor in French Literature and Language at Christ Church, University of Oxford
3 February 2022	The Temperance Movement	Annemarie McAllister, Senior Research Fellow in History at the University of Central Lancashire; James Kneale, Associate Professor in Geography at University College London; David Buckingham, Associate Professor in Cultural and Historical Geography at the University of Nottingham
10 February 2022	Walter Benjamin	Esther Leslie, Professor of Political Aesthetics at Birkbeck, University of London; Kevin McLaughlin, Dean of the Faculty and Professor of English, Comparative Literature and German Studies at Brown University; Carolin Duttlinger, Professor of German Literature and Culture at the University of Oxford
17 February 2022	Romeo and Juliet	Helen Hackett, Professor of English Literature at University College London; Paul Prescott, Professor of English and Theatre at the University of California Merced; Emma Smith, Professor of Shakespeare Studies at Hertford College, University of Oxford
24 February 2022	Peter Kropotkin	Ruth Kinna, Professor of Political Theory at Loughborough University; Lee Dugatkin, Professor of Biology at the University of Louisville; Simon Dixon, The Sir Bernard Pares Professor of Russian History at University College London
3 March 2022	The Arthashastra	Jessica Frazier, Lecturer in the Study of Religion at the University of Oxford and a Fellow of the Oxford Centre for Hindu Studies; James Hegarty, Professor of Sanskrit and Indian Religions at Cardiff University; Deven Patel, Associate Professor of South Asia Studies at the University of Pennsylvania
10 March 2022	Seismology	James Hammond, Reader in Geophysics at Birkbeck, University of London; Rebecca Bell, Senior Lecturer at Imperial College London; Zoe Mildon, Lecturer in Earth Sciences at the University of Plymouth
17 March 2022	Charisma	Tom F. Wright, Reader in Rhetoric at the University of Sussex; Linda Woodhead, Professor of Sociology of Religion at Lancaster University; David A. Bell, Sidney and Ruth Lapidus Professor in the Era of North Atlantic Revolutions at Princeton University
24 March 2022	Antigone	Edith Hall, Professor of Classics at Durham University; Oliver Taplin, Classics Scholar and Translator at Oxford University; Lyndsay Coo, Senior Lecturer in Ancient Greek Language and Literature at University of Bristol
31 March 2022	The Sistine Chapel	Catherine Fletcher, Professor of History at Manchester Metropolitan University; Sarah Vowles, The Smirnov Family Curator of Italian and French Prints and Drawings at the British Museum; Matthias Wivel, The Aud Jebsen Curator of Sixteenth-Century Italian Paintings at the National Gallery
7 April 2022	Polidori's The Vampyre	Nick Groom, Professor of Literature in English at the University of Macau; Samantha George, Associate Professor of Research in Literature at the University of Hertfordshire; Martyn Rady, Professor of Central European History at University College London
14 April 2022	Homo erectus	Peter Kjærgaard, Director of the Natural History Museum of Denmark and Professor of Evolutionary History at the University of Copenhagen; José Joordens, Senior Researcher in Human Evolution at Naturalis Biodiversity Center and Professor of Human Evolution at Maastricht University; Mark Maslin, Professor of Earth System Science at University College London
21 April 2022	Olympe de Gouges	Catriona Seth, Marshal Foch Professor of French Literature at the University of Oxford; Katherine Astbury, Professor of French Studies at the University of Warwick; Sanja Perovic, Reader in 18th century French studies at King's College London
28 April 2022	Early Christian Martyrdom	Candida Moss, Edward Cadbury Professor of Theology at the University of Birmingham; Kate Cooper, Professor of History at Royal Holloway, University of London; James Corke-Webster, Senior Lecturer in Classics, History and Liberal Arts at King's College London
5 May 2022	The Davidian Revolution	Richard Oram, Professor of Medieval and Environmental History at the University of Stirling; Alice Taylor, Professor of Medieval History at King's College London; Alex Woolf, Senior Lecturer in History at the University of St Andrews
12 May 2022	Tang Era Poetry	Tim Barrett, Professor Emeritus of East Asian History at SOAS, University of London; Tian Yuan Tan, Shaw Professor of Chinese at the University of Oxford and Professorial Fellow at University College; Frances Wood, Former Curator of the Chinese Collections at the British Library
19 May 2022	Comenius	Vladimir Urbanek, Senior Researcher in the Department of Comenius Studies and Early Modern Intellectual History at the Institute of Philosophy of the Czech Academy of Sciences; Suzanna Ivanic, Lecturer in Early Modern European History at the University of Kent; Howard Hotson, Professor of Early Modern Intellectual History at the University of Oxford and Fellow of St Anne's College
26 May 2022	Hegel's Philosophy of History	Sally Sedgwick, Professor and Chair of Philosophy at Boston University; Robert Stern, Professor of Philosophy at the University of Sheffield; Stephen Houlgate, Professor of Philosophy at the University of Warwick
9 June 2022	The Death of Stars	Martin Rees, Astronomer Royal, Fellow of Trinity College, Cambridge; Carolin Crawford, Emeritus Member of the Institute of Astronomy and Emeritus Fellow of Emmanuel College, Cambridge; Mark Sullivan, Professor of Astrophysics at the University of Southampton
16 June 2022	Dylan Thomas	Nerys Williams, Associate Professor of Poetry and Poetics at University College Dublin; John Goodby, Professor of Arts and Culture at Sheffield Hallam University; Leo Mellor, The Roma Gill Fellow in English at Murray Edwards College, Cambridge
23 June 2022	Angkor Wat	Piphal Heng, postdoctoral scholar at the Cotsen Institute and the Programme for Early Modern Southeast Asia at University of California, Los Angeles; Ashley Thompson, Hiram W Woodward Chair of Southeast Asian Art at SOAS University of London; Simon Warrack, stone conservator who has worked extensively at Angkor Wat
30 June 2022	John Bull	Judith Hawley, Professor of 18th Century Literature at Royal Holloway, University of London; Miles Taylor, Professor of British History and Society at Humboldt University of Berlin; Mark Knights, Professor of History at the University of Warwick

=== 2022–2023 ===
Broadcast date Listen again	Title	Contributors and positions held at time of broadcast
15 September 2022	Nineteen Eighty-Four	David Dwan, Professor of English Literature and Intellectual History at the University of Oxford; Lisa Mullen, Teaching Associate in Modern Contemporary Literature at the University of Cambridge; John Bowen, Professor of English Literature at the University of York
22 September 2022	Plato's Atlantis	Edith Hall, Professor of Classics at Durham University; Christopher Gill, Emeritus Professor of Ancient Thought at the University of Exeter; Angie Hobbs, Professor of the Public Understanding of Philosophy at the University of Sheffield
29 September 2022	The Electron	Victoria Martin, Professor of Collider Physics at the University of Edinburgh; Harry Cliff, Research Fellow in Particle Physics at the University of Cambridge; Frank Close, Professor Emeritus of Theoretical Physics and Fellow Emeritus at Exeter College at the University of Oxford
6 October 2022	The Knights Templar	Helen Nicholson, Professor of Medieval History at Cardiff University; Mike Carr, Lecturer in Late Medieval History at the University of Edinburgh; Jonathan Phillips, Professor of Crusading History at Royal Holloway, University of London
13 October 2022	Berthe Morisot	Tamar Garb, Professor of History of Art at University College London; Lois Oliver, Curator at the Royal Academy and Adjunct Professor of Art History at the American University of Notre Dame London; Claire Moran, Reader in French at Queen's University Belfast
20 October 2022	The Fish-Tetrapod Transition	Emily Rayfield, Professor of Palaeobiology at the University of Bristol; Michael Coates, Chair and Professor of Organismal Biology and Anatomy at the University of Chicago; Steve Brusatte, Professor of Palaeontology and Evolution at the University of Edinburgh
27 October 2022	Wilfred Owen	Jane Potter, Reader in The School of Arts at Oxford Brookes University; Fran Brearton, Professor of Modern Poetry at Queen's University Belfast; Guy Cuthbertson, Professor of British Literature and Culture at Liverpool Hope University
3 November 2022	The Morant Bay Rebellion	Matthew J Smith, Professor of History and Director of the Centre for the Study of the Legacies of British Slavery at University College London; Diana Paton, The William Robertson Professor of History at the University of Edinburgh; Lawrence Goldman, Emeritus Fellow in History at St Peter's College, University of Oxford
10 November 2022	Bauhaus	Robin Schuldenfrei, Tangen Reader in 20th Century Modernism at The Courtauld Institute of Art; Alan Powers, History Leader at the London School of Architecture; Michael White, Professor of the History of Art at the University of York
17 November 2022	Demosthenes' Philippics	Paul Cartledge, A. G. Leventis Senior Research Fellow at Clare College, University of Cambridge; Kathryn Tempest, Reader in Latin Literature and Roman History at the University of Roehampton; Jon Hesk, Reader in Greek and Classical Studies at the University of St Andrews
24 November 2022	The Challenger Expedition 1872-1876	Erika Jones, Curator of Navigation and Oceanography at Royal Museums Greenwich; Sam Robinson, Southampton Marine and Maritime Institute Research Fellow at the University of Southampton; Giles Miller, Principal Curator of Micropalaeontology at the Natural History Museum, London
1 December 2022	The Nibelungenlied	Sarah Bowden, Reader in German and Medieval Studies at King's College London; Mark Chinca, Professor of Medieval German and Comparative Literature at the University of Cambridge; Bettina Bildhauer, Professor of Modern Languages at the University of St Andrews
8 December 2022	The Irish Rebellion of 1798	Ian McBride, Foster Professor of Irish History at Hertford College, University of Oxford; Catriona Kennedy, Senior Lecturer in Modern History at the University of York; Liam Chambers, Head of Department and Senior Lecturer in History at Mary Immaculate College, Limerick
15 December 2022	Citizen Kane	Stella Bruzzi, Professor of Film and Dean of Arts and Humanities at University College London; Ian Christie, Professor of Film and Media History at Birkbeck, University of London; John David Rhodes, Professor of Film Studies and Visual Culture at the University of Cambridge
22 December 2022	Persuasion	Karen O'Brien, Vice-Chancellor of Durham University; Fiona Stafford, Professor of English Language and Literature at the University of Oxford; Paddy Bullard, Associate Professor of English Literature and Book History at the University of Reading
29 December 2022	The Great Stink	Rosemary Ashton, Emeritus Quain Professor of English Language and Literature at University College London; Stephen Halliday, Author of The Great Stink of London: Sir Joseph Bazalgette and the Cleansing of the Victorian Metropolis; Paul Dobraszczyk, Lecturer at the Bartlett School of Architecture at University College London
12 January 2023	John Donne	Mary Ann Lund, Associate Professor in Renaissance English Literature at the University of Leicester; Sue Wiseman, Professor of Seventeenth Century Literature at Birkbeck, University of London; Hugh Adlington, Professor of English Literature at the University of Birmingham
19 January 2023	Rawls' Theory of Justice	Fabienne Peter, Professor of Philosophy at the University of Warwick; Martin O'Neill, Professor of Political Philosophy at the University of York; Jonathan Wolff, The Alfred Landecker Professor of Values and Public Policy at the Blavatnik School of Government, University of Oxford and Fellow of Wolfson College
26 January 2023	Superconductivity	Nigel Hussey, Professor of Experimental Condensed Matter Physics at the University of Bristol and Radbout University; Suchitra Sebastian, Professor of Physics at the Cavendish Laboratory at the University of Cambridge; Stephen Blundell, Professor of Physics at the University of Oxford and Fellow of Mansfield College
2 February 2023	Tycho Brahe	Ole Grell, Emeritus Professor in Early Modern History at the Open University; Adam Mosley, Associate Professor of History at Swansea University; Emma Perkins, Affiliate Scholar in the Department of History and Philosophy of Science at the University of Cambridge.
9 February 2023	Chartism	Joan Allen, Visiting Fellow in History at Newcastle University and Chair of the Society for the Study of Labour History; Emma Griffin, Professor of Modern British History at the University of East Anglia and President of the Royal Historical Society; Robert Saunders, Reader in Modern British History at Queen Mary University of London
16 February 2023	Stevie Smith	Jeremy Noel-Tod, Associate Professor in the School of Literature, Drama and Creative Writing at the University of East Anglia; Noreen Masud, Lecturer in Twentieth Century Literature at the University of Bristol; Will May, Professor of Modern and Contemporary Literature at the University of Southampton
23 February 2023	Paul Erdős	Colva Roney-Dougal, Professor of Pure Mathematics at the University of St Andrews; Timothy Gowers, Professor of Mathematics at the Collège de France in Paris and Fellow of Trinity College, Cambridge; Andrew Treglown, Associate Professor in Mathematics at the University of Birmingham
2 March 2023	Megaliths	Vicki Cummings, Professor of Neolithic Archaeology at the University of Central Lancashire; Julian Thomas, Professor of Archaeology at the University of Manchester; Susan Greaney, Lecturer in Archaeology at the University of Exeter
9 March 2023	The Ramayana	Jessica Frazier, Lecturer in the Study of Religion at the University of Oxford and a Fellow of the Oxford Centre for Hindu Studies; Chakravarthi Ram-Prasad, Distinguished Professor of Comparative Religion and Philosophy at Lancaster University; Naomi Appleton, Senior Lecturer in Asian Religions at the University of Edinburgh
16 March 2023	Mercantilism	D'Maris Coffman, Professor in Economics and Finance of the Built Environment at University College London; Craig Muldrew, Professor of Social and Economic History at the University of Cambridge and a Member of Queens' College; Helen Paul, Lecturer in Economics and Economic History at the University of Southampton
23 March 2023	Solon the Lawgiver	Melissa Lane, Class of 1943 Professor of Politics at Princeton University; Hans van Wees, Grote Professor of Ancient History at University College London; William Allan, Professor of Greek and McConnell Laing Tutorial Fellow in Greek and Latin Languages and Literature at University College, University of Oxford
30 March 2023	A Room of One's Own	Hermione Lee, Emeritus Professor of English Literature at the University of Oxford; Michèle Barrett, Emeritus Professor of Modern Literary and Cultural Theory at Queen Mary University of London; Alexandra Harris, Professor of English at the University of Birmingham
6 April 2023	Cnut	Erin Goeres, Associate Professor of Old Norse Language and Literature at University College London; Pragya Vohra, Lecturer in Medieval History at the University of York; Elizabeth Tyler, Professor of Medieval Literature and Co-Director of the Centre for Medieval Studies at the University of York
13 April 2023	The Battle of Crécy	Anne Curry, Emeritus Professor of Medieval History at the University of Southampton; Andrew Ayton, Senior Research Fellow in History at Keele University; Erika Graham-Goering, Lecturer in Late Medieval History at Durham University
20 April 2023	Linnaeus	Staffan Müller-Wille, University Lecturer in History of Life, Human and Earth Sciences at the University of Cambridge; Stella Sandford, Professor of Modern European Philosophy at Kingston University London; Steve Jones, Senior Research Fellow in Genetics at University College London
27 April 2023	Walt Whitman	Sarah Churchwell, Professor of American Literature and the Public Understanding of the Humanities at the University of London; Peter Riley, Lecturer in 19th Century American Literature at the University of Exeter; Mark Ford, Professor of English and American Literature at University College London
4 May 2023	The Dead Sea Scrolls	Sarah Pearce, Ian Karten Professor of Jewish Studies and Head of the School of Humanities at the University of Southampton; Charlotte Hempel, Professor of Hebrew Bible and Second Temple Judaism at the University of Birmingham; George Brooke, Rylands Professor Emeritus of Biblical Criticism and Exegesis at the University of Manchester
11 May 2023	The Shimabara Rebellion	Satona Suzuki, Lecturer in Japanese and Modern Japanese History at SOAS University of London; Erica Baffelli, Professor of Japanese Studies at the University of Manchester; Christopher Harding, Senior Lecturer in Asian History at the University of Edinburgh
18 May 2023	Virgil's Georgics	Katharine Earnshaw, Senior Lecturer in Classics and Ancient History at the University of Exeter; Neville Morley, Professor of Classics and Ancient History at the University of Exeter; Diana Spencer, Professor of Classics at the University of Birmingham
25 May 2023	Louis XIV: The Sun King	Catriona Seth, Marshal Foch Professor of French Literature at the University of Oxford; Guy Rowlands, Professor of Early Modern History at the University of St Andrews; Penny Roberts, Professor of Early Modern History at the University of Warwick
1 June 2023	Mitochondria	Mike Murphy, Professor of Mitochondrial Redox Biology at the University of Cambridge; Florencia Camus, NERC Independent Research Fellow at University College London; Nick Lane, Professor of Evolutionary Biochemistry at University College London
8 June 2023	Oedipus Rex	Nick Lowe, Reader in Classical Literature at Royal Holloway, University of London; Fiona Macintosh, Professor of Classical Reception and Fellow of St Hilda's College at the University of Oxford; Edith Hall, Professor of Classics at Durham University
15 June 2023	Death in Venice	Karolina Watroba, Post-Doctoral Research Fellow in Modern Languages at All Souls College, University of Oxford; Erica Wickerson, a Former Research Fellow at St Johns College, University of Cambridge; Sean Williams, Senior Lecturer in German and European Cultural History at the University of Sheffield
22 June 2023	Elizabeth Anscombe	Rachael Wiseman, Senior Lecturer in Philosophy at the University of Liverpool; Constantine Sandis, Visiting Professor of Philosophy at the University of Hertfordshire, and Director of Lex Academic; Roger Teichmann, Lecturer in Philosophy at St Hilda's College, University of Oxford
29 June 2023	Jupiter	Michele Dougherty, Professor of Space Physics and Head of the Department of Physics at Imperial College London; Leigh Fletcher, Professor of Planetary Science at the University of Leicester; Carolin Crawford, Emeritus Fellow of Emmanuel College, University of Cambridge, and Emeritus Member of the Institute of Astronomy, Cambridge

=== 2023–2024 ===
Broadcast date Listen again	Title	Contributors and positions held at time of broadcast
14 September 2023	Albert Einstein	Richard Staley, Professor in History and Philosophy of Science at the University of Cambridge and Professor in History of Science at the University of Copenhagen; Diana Kormos Buchwald, Robert M. Abbey Professor of History and Director and General Editor of the Einstein Papers Project at the California Institute of Technology; John Heilbron, Professor Emeritus at the University of California, Berkeley
21 September 2023	The Seventh Seal (1000th programme)	Jan Holmberg, Director of the Ingmar Bergman Foundation, Stockholm; Laura Hubner, Professor of Film at the University of Winchester; Claire Thomson, Professor of Cinema History and Director of the School of European Languages, Culture and Society at University College London
21 September 2023	Melvyn Bragg talks to Mishal Husain	To mark his 1000th episode of In Our Time, Melvyn Bragg talks to Mishal Husain for Radio 4's Today programme.
28 September 2023	The Economic Consequences of the Peace	Margaret MacMillan, Emeritus Professor of International History at the University of Oxford; Michael Cox, Emeritus Professor of International Relations at the London School of Economics and Founding Director of LSE IDEAS; Patricia Clavin, Professor of Modern History at the University of Oxford
5 October 2023	Plankton	Dame Carol V. Robinson, Professor of Marine Sciences at the University of East Anglia; Abigail McQuatters-Gollop, Associate Professor of Marine Conservation at the University of Plymouth; Christopher Lowe, Lecturer in Marine Biology at Swansea University
12 October 2023	The Federalist Papers	Frank Cogliano, Professor of American History at the University of Edinburgh and Interim Saunders Director of the International Centre for Jefferson Studies at Monticello; Kathleen Burk, Professor Emerita of Modern and Contemporary History at University College London; Nicholas Guyatt, Professor of North American History at the University of Cambridge
19 October 2023	Julian of Norwich	Katherine Lewis, Professor of Medieval History at the University of Huddersfield; Philip Sheldrake, Professor of Christian Spirituality at the Oblate School of Theology, Texas and Senior Research Associate of the Von Hügel Institute, University of Cambridge; Laura Kalas, Senior Lecturer in Medieval English Literature at Swansea University
26 October 2023	Germinal	Susan Harrow, Ashley Watkins Chair of French at the University of Bristol; Kate Griffiths, Professor in French and Translation at Cardiff University; Edmund Birch, Lecturer in French Literature and Director of Studies at Churchill College & Selwyn College, University of Cambridge
2 November 2023	Aristotle's Nicomachean Ethics	Angie Hobbs, Professor of the Public Understanding of Philosophy at the University of Sheffield; Roger Crisp, Director of the Oxford Uehiro Centre for Practical Ethics, Professor of Moral Philosophy and Tutor in Philosophy at St Anne's College, University of Oxford; Sophia Connell, Senior Lecturer in Philosophy at Birkbeck, University of London
9 November 2023	The Barbary Corsairs	Joanna Nolan, Research Associate at SOAS, University of London; Claire Norton, Former Associate Professor of History at St Mary's University, Twickenham; Michael Talbot, Associate Professor in the History of the Ottoman Empire and the Modern Middle East at the University of Greenwich
16 November 2023	The Theory of the Leisure Class	Matthew Watson, Professor of Political Economy at the University of Warwick; Bill Waller, Professor of Economics at Hobart and William Smith Colleges, New York; Mary Wrenn, Senior Lecturer in Economics at the University of the West of England
23 November 2023	Marguerite de Navarre	Sara Barker, Associate Professor of Early Modern History and Director of the Centre for the Comparative History of Print at the University of Leeds; Emily Butterworth, Professor of Early Modern French at King's College London; Emma Herdman, Lecturer in French at the University of St Andrews
30 November 2023	Edgar Allan Poe	Bridget Bennett, Professor of American Literature and Culture at the University of Leeds; Erin Forbes, Senior Lecturer in 19th-century African American and US Literature at the University of Bristol; Tom Wright, Reader in Rhetoric at the University of Sussex
7 December 2023	Karl Barth	Stephen Plant, Dean and Runcie Fellow at Trinity Hall, University of Cambridge; Christiane Tietz, Professor for Systematic Theology at the University of Zurich; Tom Greggs, Marischal Professor of Divinity at the University of Aberdeen
14 December 2023	Tiberius	Matthew Nicholls, Senior Tutor at St. John's College, University of Oxford; Shushma Malik, Assistant Professor of Classics and Onassis Classics Fellow at Newnham College at the University of Cambridge; Catherine Steel, Professor of Classics at the University of Glasgow
21 December 2023	Vincent van Gogh	Christopher Riopelle, The Neil Westreich Curator of Post 1800 Paintings at the National Gallery; Martin Bailey, a leading Van Gogh specialist and correspondent for The Art Newspaper; Frances Fowle, Professor of Nineteenth Century Art at the University of Edinburgh and Senior Curator at National Galleries of Scotland
28 December 2023	Twelfth Night, or What You Will	Pascale Aebischer, Professor of Shakespeare and Early Modern Performance Studies at the University of Exeter; Michael Dobson, Professor of Shakespeare Studies and Director of the Shakespeare Institute at the University of Birmingham; Emma Smith, Professor of Shakespeare Studies at Hertford College, University of Oxford
11 January 2024	Condorcet	Rachel Hammersley, Professor of Intellectual History at Newcastle University; Richard Whatmore, Professor of Modern History at the University of St Andrews and Co-Director of the St Andrews Institute of Intellectual History; Tom Hopkins, Senior Teaching Associate in the Department of Politics and International Studies at the University of Cambridge and Fellow of Selwyn College
18 January 2024	Nefertiti	Aidan Dodson, Honorary Professor of Egyptology at the University of Bristol; Joyce Tyldesley, Professor of Egyptology at the University of Manchester; Kate Spence, Senior Lecturer in Egyptian Archaeology at the University of Cambridge and Fellow of Emmanuel College
25 January 2024	Panpsychism	Tim Crane, Professor of Philosophy and Pro-Rector at the Central European University, Director of Research, FWF Cluster of Excellence, Knowledge in Crisis; Joanna Leidenhag, Associate Professor in Theology and Philosophy at the University of Leeds; Philip Goff, Professor of Philosophy at Durham University
1 February 2024	The Hanseatic League	Justyna Wubs-Mrozewicz, Associate Professor of Medieval History at the University of Amsterdam; Georg Christ, Senior Lecturer in Medieval and Early Modern History at the University of Manchester; Sheilagh Ogilvie, Chichele Professor of Economic History at All Souls College, University of Oxford
8 February 2024	Hormones	Sadaf Farooqi, Professor of Metabolism and Medicine at the University of Cambridge; Rebecca Reynolds, Professor of Metabolic Medicine at the University of Edinburgh; Andrew Bicknell, Associate Professor in the School of Biological Sciences at the University of Reading
15 February 2024	Alice's Adventures in Wonderland	Franziska Kohlt, Leverhulme Research Fellow in the History of Science at the University of Leeds and the Inaugural Carrollian Fellow of the University of Southern California; Kiera Vaclavik, Professor of Children's Literature and Childhood Culture at Queen Mary University of London; Robert Douglas-Fairhurst, Professor of English Literature at Magdalen College, University of Oxford
22 February 2024	The Sack of Rome 1527	Stephen Bowd, Professor of Early Modern History at the University of Edinburgh; Jessica Goethals, Associate Professor of Italian at the University of Alabama; Catherine Fletcher, Professor of History at Manchester Metropolitan University
29 February 2024	Heisenberg's Uncertainty Principle	Fay Dowker, Professor of Theoretical Physics at Imperial College London; Harry Cliff, Research Fellow in Particle Physics at the University of Cambridge; Frank Close, Professor Emeritus of Theoretical Physics and Fellow Emeritus at Exeter College at the University of Oxford
7 March 2024	The Mokrani Revolt	Natalya Benkhaled-Vince, Associate Professor of the History of Modern France and the Francophone World, Fellow of University College, University of Oxford; Hannah-Louise Clark, Senior Lecturer in Global Economic and Social History at the University of Glasgow; Jim House, Senior Lecturer in French and Francophone History at the University of Leeds
14 March 2024	The Waltz	Susan Jones, Emeritus Professor of English Literature at the University of Oxford; Derek B. Scott, Professor Emeritus of Music at the University of Leeds; Theresa Buckland, Emeritus Professor of Dance History and Ethnography at the University of Roehampton
21 March 2024	Julian the Apostate	James Corke-Webster, Reader in Classics, History and Liberal Arts at King's College, London; Lea Niccolai, Assistant Professor in Classics at the University of Cambridge and Fellow and Director of Studies in Classics, Trinity College; Shaun Tougher, Professor of Late Roman and Byzantine History at Cardiff University
28 March 2024	The Kalevala	Riitta-Liisa Valijärvi, Associate Professor in Finnish and Minority Languages at University College London; Thomas A. DuBois, The Halls-Bascom Professor of Scandinavian Folklore and Literature at the University of Wisconsin–Madison; Daniel Abondolo, Formerly Reader in Hungarian at University College London
4 April 2024	Nikola Tesla	Simon Schaffer, Emeritus Fellow of Darwin College, University of Cambridge; Jill Jonnes, Historian and author of Empires of Light: Edison, Tesla, Westinghouse and the Race to Electrify the World; Iwan Morus, Professor of History at Aberystwyth University
11 April 2024	Lysistrata	Paul Cartledge, AG Leventis Senior Research Fellow of Clare College, University of Cambridge; Sarah Miles, Associate Professor in the Department of Classics and Ancient History at Durham University; James Robson, Professor of Classical Studies at the Open University
18 April 2024	Napoleon's Hundred Days	Michael Rowe, Reader in European History at King's College London; Katherine Astbury, Professor of French Studies at the University of Warwick; Zack White, Leverhulme Early Career Research Fellow at the University of Portsmouth
25 April 2024	Bertolt Brecht	Laura Bradley, Professor of German and Theatre at the University of Edinburgh; David Barnett, Professor of Theatre at the University of York; Tom Kuhn, Professor of Twentieth Century German Literature, Emeritus Fellow of St Hugh's College, University of Oxford
2 May 2024	Mercury	Emma Bunce, Professor of Planetary Plasma Physics and Director of the Institute for Space at the University of Leicester; David Rothery, Professor of Planetary Geosciences at the Open University; Carolin Crawford, Emeritus Fellow of Emmanuel College, University of Cambridge, and Emeritus Member of the Institute of Astronomy, Cambridge
9 May 2024	Sir Thomas Wyatt	Brian Cummings, 50th Anniversary Professor of English at the University of York; Susan Brigden, Retired Fellow at Lincoln College, University of Oxford; Laura Ashe, Professor of English Literature at the University of Oxford
16 May 2024	Philippa Foot	Anil Gomes, Fellow and Tutor in Philosophy at Trinity College, University of Oxford; Sophie Grace Chappell, Professor of Philosophy at the Open University; Rachael Wiseman, Reader in Philosophy at the University of Liverpool
23 May 2024	Empress Dowager Cixi	Yangwen Zheng, Professor of Chinese History at the University of Manchester; Rana Mitter, The S.T. Lee Professor of US-Asia Relations at the Harvard Kennedy School; Ronald Po, Associate Professor in the Department of International History at London School of Economics and Visiting Professor at Leiden University
30 May 2024	Marsilius of Padua	Annabel Brett, Professor of Political Thought and History at the University of Cambridge; George Garnett, Professor of Medieval History and Fellow and Tutor at St Hugh's College, University of Oxford; Serena Ferente, Professor of Medieval History at the University of Amsterdam
6 June 2024	The Orkneyinga Saga	Judith Jesch, Professor of Viking Studies at the University of Nottingham; Jane Harrison, Archaeologist and Research Associate at Oxford and Newcastle Universities; Alex Woolf, Senior Lecturer in History at the University of St Andrews
13 June 2024	Fielding's Tom Jones	Judith Hawley, Professor of 18th Century Literature at Royal Holloway, University of London; Henry Power, Professor of English Literature at the University of Exeter; Charlotte Roberts, Associate Professor of English Literature at University College London
20 June 2024	Karma	Monima Chadha, Professor of Indian Philosophy and Tutorial Fellow at Lady Margaret Hall, University of Oxford; Jessica Frazier, Lecturer in the Study of Religion at the University of Oxford and a Fellow of the Oxford Centre for Hindu Studies; Karen O'Brien-Kop, Lecturer in Asian Religions at King's College London
27 June 2024	Monet in England	Karen Serres, Senior Curator of Paintings at the Courtauld Gallery, London; Frances Fowle, Professor of Nineteenth-Century Art at the University of Edinburgh and Senior Curator of French Art at the National Galleries of Scotland; Jackie Wullschläger, Chief Art Critic for the Financial Times and author of Monet, The Restless Vision
4 July 2024	Bacteriophages	Martha Clokie, Director for the Centre for Phage Research and Professor of Microbiology at the University of Leicester; James Ebdon, Professor of Environmental Microbiology at the University of Brighton; Claas Kirchhelle, Historian and Chargé de Recherche at the French National Institute of Health and Medical Research's CERMES3 Unit in Paris.

=== 2024–2025 ===
Broadcast date Listen again	Title	Contributors and positions held at time of broadcast
19 September 2024	Benjamin Disraeli	Lawrence Goldman, Emeritus Fellow in History at St Peter's College, University of Oxford; Emily Jones, Lecturer in Modern British History at the University of Manchester; Daisy Hay, Professor of English Literature and Life Writing at the University of Exeter.
26 September 2024	Wormholes	Toby Wiseman, Professor of Theoretical Physics at Imperial College London; Katy Clough, Senior Lecturer in Mathematics at Queen Mary, University of London; Andrew Pontzen, Professor of Cosmology at Durham University.
3 October 2024	The Haymarket Affair	Ruth Kinna, Professor of Political Theory at Loughborough University; Christopher Phelps, associate Professor of American Studies at the University of Nottingham; Gary Gerstle, Paul Mellon Professor of American History Emeritus at the University of Cambridge.
10 October 2024	Robert Graves	Paul O'Prey, Emeritus Professor of Modern Literature at the University of Roehampton, London; Fran Brearton, Professor of Modern Poetry at Queen's University, Belfast; Bob Davis, Professor of Religious and Cultural Education at the University of Glasgow.
17 October 2024	Hayek's The Road to Serfdom	Bruce Caldwell, Research Professor of Economics at Duke University and Director of the Center for the History of Political Economy; Melissa Lane, The Class of 1943 Professor of Politics at Princeton University and the 50th Professor of Rhetoric at Gresham College in London; Ben Jackson, Professor of Modern History and fellow of University College at the University of Oxford.
24 October 2024	Little Women	Bridget Bennett, Professor of American Literature and Culture at the University of Leeds; Erin Forbes, Senior Lecturer in African American and U.S. Literature at the University of Bristol; Tom Wright, Reader in Rhetoric and Head of the Department of English Literature at the University of Sussex.
31 October 2024	The Venetian Empire	Maartje van Gelder, Professor in Early Modern History at the University of Amsterdam; Stephen Bowd, Professor of Early Modern History at the University of Edinburgh; Georg Christ, Reader in Senior Lecturer in Medieval and Early Modern History at the University of Manchester.
7 November 2024	George Herbert	Helen Wilcox, Professor Emerita of English Literature at Bangor University; Victoria Moul, Formerly Professor of Early Modern Latin and English at UCL; Simon Jackson, Director of Music and Director of Studies in English at Peterhouse, University of Cambridge.
14 November 2024	The Antikythera Mechanism	Mike Edmunds, Emeritus Professor of Astrophysics at Cardiff University; Jo Marchant, Science journalist and author of Decoding the Heavens on the Antikythera Mechanism; Liba Taub, Professor Emerita in the Department of History and Philosophy of Science at the University of Cambridge and Visiting Scholar at the Deutsches Museum, Munich.
21 November 2024	Italo Calvino	Guido Bonsaver, Professor of Italian Cultural History at the University of Oxford; Jennifer Burns, Professor of Italian Studies at the University of Warwick; Beatrice Sica, Associate Professor in Italian Studies at UCL.
28 November 2024	The Hanoverian Succession	Andreas Gestrich, Professor Emeritus at Trier University and Former Director of the German Historical Institute in London; Elaine Chalus, Professor of British History at the University of Liverpool; Mark Knights, Professor of History at the University of Warwick.
5 December 2024	Nizami Ganjavi	Christine van Ruymbeke, Professor of Persian Literature and Culture at the University of Cambridge; Narguess Farzad, Senior Lecturer in Persian Studies at SOAS, University of London; Dominic Parviz Brookshaw, Professor of Persian Literature and Iranian Culture at the University of Oxford.
12 December 2024	The Habitability of Planets	Jayne Birkby, Associate Professor of Exoplanetary Sciences at the University of Oxford and Tutorial Fellow in Physics at Brasenose College; Saidul Islam, Assistant Professor of Chemistry at King's College London; Oliver Shorttle, Professor of Natural Philosophy at the University of Cambridge and Fellow of Clare College.
19 December 2024	Plutarch's Parallel Lives	Judith Mossman, Professor Emerita of Classics at Coventry University; Andrew Erskine, Professor of Ancient History at the University of Edinburgh; Paul Cartledge, AG Leventis Senior Research Fellow of Clare College, University of Cambridge.
26 December 2024	Vase-mania	Jenny Uglow, writer and biographer; Rosemary Sweet, Professor of urban history at the University of Leicester; Caroline McCaffrey-Howarth, Lecturer in the history of art at the University of Edinburgh.
2 January 2025	Slime Moulds	Jonathan Chubb, Professor of Quantitative Cell Biology at University College, London; Elinor Thompson, Reader in microbiology and plant science at the University of Greenwich; Merlin Sheldrake, Biologist and writer.
16 January 2025	The Battle of Valmy	Michael Rowe, Reader in European History at King's College London; Heidi Mehrkens, Lecturer in Modern European History at the University of Aberdeen; Colin Jones, Professor Emeritus of History at Queen Mary, University of London.
23 January 2025	Socrates in Prison	Angie Hobbs, Professor of the Public Understanding of Philosophy at the University of Sheffield; Fiona Leigh, Associate Professor in the Department of Philosophy at University College London; James Warren, Professor of Ancient Philosophy at the University of Cambridge and Fellow of Corpus Christi College, Cambridge.
30 January 2025	Pope Joan	Katherine Lewis, Honorary Professor of Medieval History at the University of Lincoln and Research Associate at the University of York; Laura Kalas, Senior Lecturer in Medieval English Literature at Swansea University; Anthony Bale, Professor of Medieval & Renaissance English at the University of Cambridge and Fellow of Girton College.
6 February 2025	Sir John Soane	Frances Sands, the Curator of Drawings and Books at Sir John Soane's Museum; Frank Salmon, Associate Professor of the History of Art at the University of Cambridge and Director of the Ax:son Johnson Centre for the Study of Classical Architecture; Gillian Darley, historian and author of Soane's biography.
13 February 2025	Catherine of Aragon	Lucy Wooding, Langford Fellow and Tutor in History at Lincoln College, University of Oxford and Professor of Early Modern History at Oxford; Maria Hayward, Professor of Early Modern History at the University of Southampton; Gonzalo Velasco Berenguer, Lecturer in Global Medieval and Early Modern History at the University of Bristol.
20 February 2025	Oliver Goldsmith	David O’Shaughnessy, Professor of Eighteenth-Century Studies at the University of Galway; Judith Hawley, Professor of Eighteenth-Century Literature at Royal Holloway, University of London; Michael Griffin, Professor of English at the University of Limerick.
27 February 2025	Kali	Bihani Sarkar, Senior Lecturer in Comparative Non-Western Thought at Lancaster University; Julius Lipner, Professor Emeritus of Hinduism and the Comparative Study of Religion at the University of Cambridge; Jessica Frazier, Lecturer in the Study of Religion at the University of Oxford and fellow at the Oxford Centre for Hindu Studies.
6 March 2025	Pollination	Beverley Glover, Director of the Cambridge University Botanic Garden; Jane Memmott, Professor of Ecology at the University of Bristol; Lars Chittka, Professor of Sensory and Behavioural Ecology at Queen Mary, University of London.
13 March 2025	Cyrus the Great	Mateen Arghandehpour, a researcher for the Invisible East Project at Oxford University; Lindsay Allen, Senior Lecturer in Ancient Greek and Near Eastern History at King's College London; Lynette Mitchell, Professor Emerita in Classics and Ancient History at Exeter University.
20 March 2025	Thomas Middleton	Emma Smith, Professor of Shakespeare Studies at Hertford College, University of Oxford; Lucy Munro, Professor of Shakespeare and Early Modern Literature at King's College London; Michelle O’Callaghan, Professor of Early Modern Literature at the University of Reading.
27 March 2025	Maurice Merleau-Ponty	Komarine Romdenh-Romluc, Senior Lecturer in Philosophy at the University of Sheffield; Thomas Baldwin, Emeritus Professor of Philosophy at the University of York; Timothy Mooney, Associate Professor of Philosophy at University College, Dublin.
3 April 2025	The Gracchi	Catherine Steel, Professor of Classics at the University of Glasgow; Federico Santangelo, Professor of Ancient History at Newcastle University; Kathryn Tempest, Lecturer in Roman History at the University of Leicester.
10 April 2025	The Battle of Clontarf	Seán Duffy, Professor of Medieval Irish and Insular History at Trinity College Dublin; Máire Ní Mhaonaigh, Professor of Celtic and Medieval Studies at the University of Cambridge and a Fellow of St John's College, Cambridge; Alex Woolf, Professor of Medieval Studies at the University of St Andrews.
17 April 2025	Typology	Miri Rubin, Professor of Medieval and Early Modern History at Queen Mary, University of London; Harry Spillane, Munby Fellow in Bibliography at Cambridge and Research Fellow at Darwin College; Sophie Lunn-Rockliffe, Associate Professor in Patristics at Cambridge.
24 April 2025	Molière	Noel Peacock, Emeritus Marshall Professor in French Language and Literature at the University of Glasgow; Jan Clarke, Professor of French at Durham University; Joe Harris, Professor of Early Modern French and Comparative Literature at Royal Holloway, University of London.
1 May 2025	The Korean Empire	Nuri Kim, Associate Professor in Korean Studies at the faculty of Asian and Middle Eastern Studies at the University of Cambridge and Fellow of Wolfson College; Holly Stephens, Lecturer in Japanese and Korean Studies at the University of Edinburgh; Derek Kramer, Lecturer in Korean Studies at the University of Sheffield.
8 May 2025	Lise Meitner	Jess Wade, Royal Society University Research Fellow and Lecturer in Functional Materials at Imperial College, London; Frank Close, Professor Emeritus of Theoretical Physics and Fellow Emeritus at Exeter College, University of Oxford; Steven Bramwell, Director of the London Centre for Nanotechnology and Professor of Physics at University College London.
15 May 2025	Copyright	Lionel Bently, Herchel Smith Professor of Intellectual Property Law at the University of Cambridge; Will Slauter, Professor of History at Sorbonne University, Paris; Katie McGettigan, Senior Lecturer in American Literature at Royal Holloway, University of London.
22 May 2025	Paul von Hindenburg	Anna von der Goltz, Professor of History at Georgetown University, Washington DC; Christopher Clark, Regius Professor of History at the University of Cambridge; Colin Storer, Associate Professor in Modern European History at the University of Warwick.
29 May 2025	Hypnosis	Catherine Wynne, Reader in Victorian and Early Twentieth-Century Literature and Visual Cultures at the University of Hull; Devin Terhune, Reader in Experimental Psychology at King's College London; Quinton Deeley, Consultant Neuropsychiatrist at the South London and Maudsley NHS Foundation Trust, and Senior Lecturer at the Institute of Psychiatry, Psychology and Neuroscience at King's College London, where he leads the Cultural and Social Neuroscience Research Group.
5 June 2025	The Vienna Secession	Mark Berry, Professor of Music and Intellectual History at Royal Holloway, University of London; Leslie Topp, Professor Emerita in History of Architecture at Birkbeck, University of London; Diane Silverthorne, art historian and 'Vienna 1900' scholar.
12 June 2025	The Evolution of Lungs	Steve Brusatte, Professor of Palaeontology and Evolution at the University of Edinburgh; Emily Rayfield, Professor of Palaeobiology at the University of Bristol; Jonathan Codd, Professor of Integrative Zoology at the University of Manchester.
19 June 2025	Barbour's 'Brus'	Rhiannon Purdie, Professor of English and Older Scots at the University of St Andrews; Steve Boardman, Professor of Medieval Scottish History at the University of Edinburgh; Michael Brown, Professor of Scottish History at the University of St Andrews.
26 June 2025	Dragons	Kelsey Granger, Post Doctoral Researcher in Chinese History at the University of Edinburgh; Daniel Ogden, Professor of Ancient History at the University of Exeter; Juliette Wood, Associate Lecturer in the School of Welsh at the University of Wales.
3 July 2025	Civility: talking with those who disagree with you	Teresa Bejan, Professor of Political Theory at Oriel College, University of Oxford; Phil Withington, Professor of History at the University of Sheffield; John Gallagher, Associate Professor of Early Modern History at the University of Leeds.
24 December 2025	Melvyn Bragg meets Misha Glenny	Melvyn Bragg and Misha Glenny meet on BBC Radio 4's flagship news programme Today to discuss In Our Time's appeal and what Misha will bring to the series from 15th January.

The 2024–2025 series was the last to be hosted by Melvyn Bragg.

=== 2026 ===
Broadcast date Listen again	Title	Contributors and positions held at time of broadcast
8 January 2026	Welcoming Misha Glenny to the In Our Time studio	Misha Glenny, new presenter of the series; Simon Tillotson, series producer
15 January 2026	On Liberty	Helen McCabe, Professor of Political Theory at the University of Nottingham; Mark Philp, Emeritus Professor of History and Politics at the University of Warwick; Piers Norris Turner, Associate Professor of Philosophy at the Ohio State University.
22 January 2026	The Mariana Trench	Heather Stewart, Director of Kelpie Geoscience and Associate Professor at the University of Western Australia; Jon Copley, Professor of Ocean Exploration and Science Communication at the University of Southampton; Alan Jamieson, Director of the Deep Sea Research Centre at the University of Western Australia.
29 January 2026	The Roman Arena	Kathleen Coleman, James Loeb Professor of the Classics at Harvard University; John Pearce, Reader in Archaeology at King’s College London; Matthew Nicholls, Fellow and Senior Tutor at St John's College, Oxford.
5 February 2026	Henry IV Part 1	Emma Smith, Professor of Shakespeare Studies at Hertford College, University of Oxford; Lucy Munro, Professor of Shakespeare and Early Modern Literature at King's College London; Laurence Publicover, Associate Professor in the Department of English at the University of Bristol.
12 February 2026	The Code of Hammurabi	Martin Worthington, Professor in Middle Eastern Studies at Trinity College Dublin; Frances Reynolds, Shillito Fellow and Associate Professor of Assyriology at the University of Oxford and Senior Research Fellow at The Queen’s College; Selena Wisnom, Lecturer in the Heritage of the Middle East at the University of Leicester.
19 February 2026	John Keats	Fiona Stafford, Professor of English Language and Literature and Tutorial Fellow at Somerville College, University of Oxford; Nicholas Roe, Wardlaw Professor of English Literature at the University of St Andrews; Meiko O’Halloran, Senior Lecturer in Romantic Literature at the University of Newcastle.
26 February 2026	The Columbian Exchange	Rebecca Earle, Professor of History at the University of Warwick; John Lindo, Associate Professor of Anthropology at Emory University; Mark Maslin, Professor of Earth System Science at University College London.
5 March 2026	Margaret Beaufort	Joanna Laynesmith, Visiting Research Fellow at the University of Reading; Katherine Lewis, Honorary Professor of Medieval History at the University of Lincoln and Research Associate at the University of York; David Grummitt, Staff Tutor in History at the Open University.
12 March 2026	Archaea	Christa Schleper, Professor of Genetics and Microbiology at the University of Vienna; Thorsten Allers, Professor of Archaeal Genetics at the University of Nottingham; Buzz Baum, Group leader at the MRC Laboratory of Molecular Biology in Cambridge.
19 March 2026	Dadaism	Dawn Ades, Emeritus Professor of Art History and Theory at the University of Essex; Ruth Hemus, Professor of French and Visual Culture at Royal Holloway, University of London; Stephen Forcer, Professor of French at the University of Glasgow.
26 March 2026	Silicon	Kate Hendry, Oceanographer at the British Antarctic Survey and Bye-Fellow of Queen’s College, University of Cambridge; Andrea Sella, Professor of Chemistry at University College London; Monica Grady, Professor Emerita in Planetary and Space Sciences at the Open University.
2 April 2026	The Spanish-American War 1898	Frank Cogliano, Professor of American History at the University of Edinburgh; Mary Vincent, Professor of Modern European History at the University of Sheffield; Stephen Wilkinson, Senior Lecturer in Politics and International Relations at the University of Buckingham.
9 April 2026	Handel's Messiah	Donald Burrows, Emeritus Professor of Music at the Open University; Ruth Smith, Trustee and Council Member of the Handel Institute; Larry Zazzo, Countertenor and Senior Lecturer in Music at Newcastle University.
16 April 2026	M.C. Escher	Marcus du Sautoy, Simonyi Professor for the Public Understanding of Science, Professor of Mathematics and Fellow of New College, University of Oxford; Sarah Hart, Professor Emerita of Mathematics and Fellow of Birkbeck College, University of London, and Fellow of Gresham College; Judith Kadee, Exhibitions project manager and public programme curator at Hague Historical Museum.
23 April 2026	Indian Indentured Labour	Purba Hossain, Lecturer in Modern History at the University of York; Neha Hui, Associate Professor in Economics at the University of Reading; Clem Seecharan, Emeritus Professor of History at London Metropolitan University.
30 April 2026	Cybernetics	Jacob Ward, Assistant Professor of History and the Science, Technology and Society Studies Research Program at the Faculty of Arts and Social Sciences at Maastricht University; Jon Agar, Professor of Science and Technology Studies at University College London; Orit Halpern, Lighthouse Professor and Chair of Digital Cultures at Technische Universität Dresden.
7 May 2026	Joseph Roth	Helen Chambers, Emeritus Professor of German at the University of St Andrews; Deborah Holmes, Associate Professor of Modern German Literature at the University of Salzburg; Jon Hughes, Reader in German and Cultural Studies at Royal Holloway, University of London.
14 May 2026	The Garamantes	David Mattingly, Emeritus Professor of Roman Archaeology at the University of Leicester; Farès Moussa, Visiting Fellow at the University of Southampton and Cultural Heritage Consultant; Josephine Quinn, Professor of Ancient History and Fellow of St John’s College, University of Cambridge.
21 May 2026	The Levellers	Teresa Bejan, Professor of Political Theory and Fellow of Oriel College, University of Oxford; Ted Vallance, Professor of History and Dean of Research and Doctoral Study at the University of Roehampton; Clare Jackson, Honorary Professor of Early Modern History and Walter Grant Scott Fellow in History at Trinity Hall, University of Cambridge.
28 May 2026	The Welsh Marches	Rhun Emlyn, Lecturer in the Department of History and Welsh History at Aberystwyth University; Helen Fulton, Professor of Medieval Literature at the University of Bristol; Huw Pryce, Emeritus Professor of Welsh History at Bangor University.
4 June 2026	The Evolution of Trees	Jenny McElwain, 1711 chair of botany at Trinity College Dublin and director of Trinity Botanic Gardens; Christopher Berry, senior lecturer in earth and environmental sciences at Cardiff University; Bill Baker, senior researcher at the Royal Botanic Gardens, Kew.
11 June 2026	Machado de Assis	Ana Cláudia Suriani da Silva, Associate Professor in Brazilian Studies at University College London; Claire Williams, Professor of Brazilian Literature and Culture at the Faculty of Modern Languages at the University of Oxford, fellow of St. Peter's College; Viviane Carvalho da Annunciação, Affiliated Lecturer at the Faculty of Modern and Medieval Languages and Linguistics at the University of Cambridge.
18 June 2026	The Delian League	Leah Lazar, Lecturer in Hellenistic Culture at the University of Manchester; Polly Low, Professor in the Department of Classics and Ancient History at the University of Durham; Paul Cartledge, AG Leventis Senior Research Fellow of Clare College, University of Cambridge.
25 June 2026	Vigée Le Brun	Rosalind Polly Blakesley, Master of Pembroke College and Professor of Russian and European Art at the University of Cambridge; Robert Wenley, Deputy Director of Collections and Research at the Barber Institute of Fine Arts, University of Birmingham; Francesca Whitlum-Cooper, Curator of Later Italian, Spanish and French Paintings at The National Gallery, London.
2 July 2026	Seashells	Suzanne Williams, Merit Researcher at the Natural History Museum; Liz Harper, Professor of Evolutionary Malacology in the Department of Earth Sciences and Fellow at Gonville and Caius College, University of Cambridge; Helen Scales, Marine biologist and Author.

=== 2026–2027 ===
Broadcast date Listen again	Title	Contributors and positions held at time of broadcast
17 September 2026	Thomas More's Utopia	Laura Ashe, Professor of English Literature at Worcester College, University of Oxford; Cathy Shrank, Professor of Tudor and Renaissance Literature at the University of Sheffield; Joanne Paul, Honorary Associate Professor in Intellectual History at the University of Sussex.
24 September 2026	Particle Accelerators	Harry Cliff, Particle Physicist at the University of Cambridge; Victoria Martin, Professor of Collider Physics at the University of Edinburgh; Joseph Martin, Professor of the History of Science and Technology at Durham University.
1 October 2026	Casablanca	Ian Christie, Emeritus Professor of Film and Media History at Birkbeck University of London; Pamela Hutchinson, Film historian and critic; Sheldon Hall, Emeritus Fellow at Sheffield Hallam University.
8 October 2026	Megalosaurus	Emily Rayfield, Professor of Palaeobiology at the University of Bristol; Emma Nicholls, Vertebrate Palaeontologist and Collections Manager at Oxford University Museum of Natural History; Steve Brusatte, Professor of Palaeontology and Evolution at the University of Edinburgh.
15 October 2026	The Battle of Antietam	Karen Salt, Professor of Culture, Place and Communities at Manchester Metropolitan University; Susan-Mary Grant, Professor Emerita of American History at Newcastle University; Robert Cook, Emeritus Professor of American History at the University of Sussex.
22 October 2026	Ishtar, the Mesopotamian goddess of love, sex and war	Martin Worthington, Leader of the European Research Council Project MesOr at the University of Pisa; Christopher Metcalf, Professor of Ancient Literature and Religion and Fellow in Classics at Queen’s College, University of Oxford; Selena Wisnom, Lecturer in the Heritage of the Middle East at the University of Leicester.
29 October 2026	Immune cells	Sheena Cruickshank, Professor of Immunology at the University of Manchester; Dan Davis, Author and Professor of Immunology at Imperial College London; Emily Gwyer Findlay, Professor of Inflammation Biology at the University of Southampton.
5 November 2026	Jataka tales: Stories of the Buddha's Many Births	Naomi Appleton, Professor of Buddhist Studies and Indian Religions at the University of Edinburgh; Mahinda Deegalle, Bye-Fellow at St Edmund’s College, University of Cambridge; Alexandra Green, SP Shaw Curator for Southeast Asia at the British Museum.
12 November 2026	Margaret Cavendish	Francesca Peacock, Writer and Researcher; Emma Rees, Professor of English Literature and Gender Studies at the University of Chester; Daniel Whiting, Professor of Philosophy at the University of Southampton.
19 November 2026	The Pre-Raphaelites	Dinah Roe, Reader in Nineteenth-Century Literature at Oxford Brookes University; Carol Jacobi, Curator of British Art 1850-1915 at Tate Britain; Melissa Gustin, Curator of British Art at National Museums Liverpool.
