= Laurence Totelin =

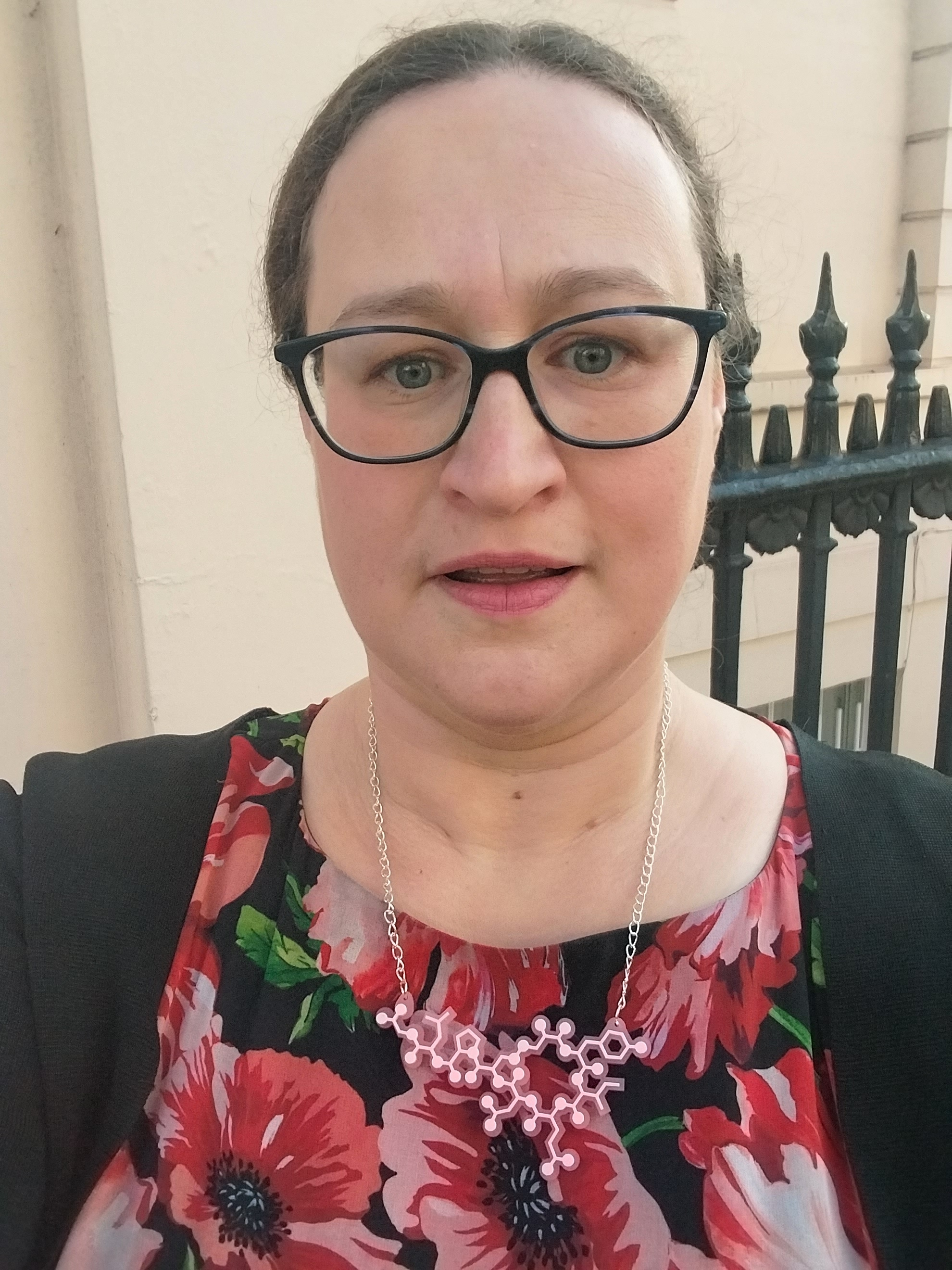
Prof. Laurence Totelin in 2023

Laurence Totelin (FRHistS) is a historian of Greek and Roman science, technology, and medicine. She is professor of ancient history at Cardiff University.

== Education ==
Totelin received her MPhil from the University of Cambridge in 2002. Her thesis was Recipes of mithridatium in Antiquity and the Middle Ages: Towards an Anthropology of Antidotes. She was awarded her PhD from University College London in 2006. Her doctoral thesis was Hippocratic Recipes: Oral and Written Transmission of Pharmacological Knowledge in Fifth- and Fourth Century Greece.

== Career and research ==
Totelin specialises in pharmacology, botany and gynaecology in antiquity. She has written and edited books on ancient botany and ancient medicine. She has co-edited three Festschriften, for Elizabeth Craik, Vivian Nutton, and Liba Taub. As well as academic research, Totelin writes for public-facing audiences such as The Conversation, and writes a blog, Concocting History.

Totelin is a Fellow of the Royal Historical Society and a Fellow of the Linnean Society.

== Bibliography ==
- (edited by Laurence Totelin and Emma Perkins) Tools, Techniques, and Technologies. Essays in Ancient Science and its Reception in Honour of Liba Taub (Berlin: De Gruyter, 2024)
- L. Totelin (ed.) A cultural history of medicine in antiquity. The Cultural Histories Series. London: Bloomsbury, 2021.
- M. Bradley, V. Leonard, and L. Totelin (eds) Bodily fluids in antiquity. London: Routledge, 2021.
- L. Totelin, and R. Flemming (eds) Medicine and markets in the Graeco-Roman world and beyond: Essays in honour of Vivian Nutton. Classical Press of Wales, 2020.
- L. Totelin, and V. Nutton (eds) Ancient medicine, behind and beyond Hippocrates: essays in honour of Elizabeth Craik. Pisa: Fabrizio Serra, 2020.
- G. Hardy, and L. Totelin, Ancient botany. Science of Antiquity. Abingdon and New York: Routledge, 2015.
- Hippocratic recipes: Oral and written transmission of pharmacological knowledge in fifth- and fourth-century Greece. Studies in Ancient Medicine Vol. 34. 2009. Leiden: Brill Academic Publishers.
