= Rebecca Flemming =

British classical scholar (born 1966)

Rebecca Flemming (born 27 May 1966) is a classical scholar. She holds the inaugural A. G. Leventis Chair of Ancient Greek Scientific and Technological Thought at the University of Exeter.

== Biography ==
Flemming was born on 27 May 1966. She studied for her MA and PhD at University College London. She obtained her PhD in 1997 with a doctoral thesis titled "Woman as an Object of Medical Knowledge in the Roman Empire, from Celsus to Galen". From 1999 to 2006, she was a lecturer in ancient history at King's College London. From 2006 to 2022, she was a lecturer and then a senior lecturer in ancient history at the University of Cambridge and a fellow of Jesus College, Cambridge.

Flemming took up her position at Exeter University in 2022 when the chair was established with a £1.2m donation from the A. G. Leventis Foundation. Since 2022, she has also served as the Director of the Wellcome Centre for Cultures and Environments of Health.

== Career and research ==
Flemming specialises in medicine, reproduction, pandemics, and gender in classical antiquity.

In 2021, Flemming contributed to an episode of In Our Time on the Justinianic Plague.

== Selected works ==
- Flemming, Rebecca (2000). Medicine and the Making of Roman Women: Gender, Nature, and Authority from Celsus to Galen. Oxford University Press. ISBN 9780199240029.
- Hopwood, Nick; Flemming, Rebecca; Kassell, Lauren, eds. (2018). Reproduction: Antiquity to the Present Day. Cambridge University Press. ISBN 9781107658370.
- Flemming, Rebecca; Totelin, Laurence, eds. (2020). Medicine and Markets in the Graeco-Roman World and Beyond Essays on Ancient Medicine in Honour of Vivian Nutton. Classical Press of Wales. ISBN 9781910589786.
