= Sheldon Gosline =

American Egyptologist

Sheldon Lee Gosline is an American Egyptologist who has extensively studied the ancient civilizations of the Far East. He is noted for proposing the existence of a developing literate civilization in southern China dating to the second millennium BCE.

== Biography ==
Sheldon Lee Gosline began his professional education at the University of Pennsylvania, where he received a B.A. degrees in Oriental Studies and Art History in 1985. He later continued his studies at the University of Cambridge, where he received a B.A. degree 1988 and was awarded an M.A. degree in Oriental Studies in 1993. He interrupted his stay at Cambridge to study at the University of Chicago, receiving an M.A. degree in Egyptology and Near Eastern Archaeology in 1992. After Cambridge he studied at University of Wisconsin-Madison. He received his Ph.D. in 2013 from University College London, where he researched at the Wellcome Trust Centre for the History of Medicine and the UCL Centre for the History of Medicine. His thesis concerned the intersection of business and medicine.

== Career ==
Gosline is owner of Shangri-La Publications Art Design and Shangrila Gifts based in Warren Center, PA.

Gosline has taught at Northeast Normal University, Changchun, China; and at UW-Madison. He was at Northeast Normal University through 2004. In 2011, he moved to London to pursue a Ph.D. in the history of medicine, at University College London. Once he completed the degree, he returned to China to research the writing of the country's minority groups. He was first a visiting professor at Minzu University of China and Tsinghua University, both in Beijing. Since 2015, he has taught medical humanities at Peking University. He is a member of several professional associations.

He states that he has become proficient in or conversant with nine contemporary or ancient languages.

== Lost civilization theory ==
IN 2013 Gosline was shown some inscriptions found in Guangxi province and considered that several were based on the Indus script and Persian cuneiform. On a field trip to the area where they were found in 2014 he discovered what he considered evidence of further inscriptions made up of large rocks regularly spaced and what he called "a man-made platform of megalithic construction" and something that "appeared to be a carved chair or throne". Sitting on it he "sensed a harmony and that I was in the midst of an ancient time calculating device". He returned to what he called an "observatory complex" with caver including royal burials in June 2014 with a group of researchers who examined the site and stated that "We confirmed most of the things I'd found as potential alignments, and we confirmed that there was artifact evidence in the area that showed human occupation." He reported this in a talk to the New York Explorers Club later that year, saying that he believed he had found an unknown civilization.

Reports from Chinese researchers who accompanied him were less positive. Dr. Ye Xiaohong reported that "Two suspected cave tombs are not man-made," "No artificial traces were found on the huge stone in the suspected artificial remains, neither the suspected structures for observation nor the suspected ancient topographic maps" and that what Gosline had interpreted as ancient writing on some rocks "were certainly produced by natural force". The Chinese researchers also surveyed the alignments that Gosline thought related to the chair (which they agreed was a natural water-created formation) and concluded that the stone could not have been used as part of an observatory.

Another Chinese researcher who was part of Gosline's group stated that "Gosline proclaimed that he had found several megalithic sites including observatories, palaces, and ancient cave tombs，petro-glyphs and even plan maps at Gansang, Nadou, and Bupeng in Pingguo county, Guangxi". The conclusion was that "We have not found any artificial remains, artifacts, and occupation layer both at Nadou and Bupeng sites" and that most of the "scratches, the petro-glyphs and plan maps on the rocks called by Gosline, are natural" with a few that might be artificial and needed microscopic examination. However they did believe that the "Gansang site might have worked as an important settlement in Youjiang River Reach." Commenting on the engraved stones reported by Gosline, they commented that they seemed too new, that they were too intact with "the whole texts just fit to the sizes of the planks", that they lacked an archaeological context and that there were too few repetitions of characters.

Gosline's observation that the newly discovered inscriptions seemed to include Persian cuneiform is unproven as of 2016.
