= Liba =

Liba may refer to:

== People ==
- Igor Liba (born 1960), Slovak ice hockey player
- Liba Taub (born 1954), American historian
- Peter Liba (1940–2007), Canadian journalist and politician
- Zohar Liba (born 1977), Israeli actor

== Places ==
- Liba, China
- Libá, Czech Republic

== Other ==
- Liba or Spondias, flowering plant
- Loyola Institute of Business Administration
