= Harold J. Cook =

American historian

Harold John Cook FRCP (born 1952) is John F. Nickoll Professor of History at Brown University and was director of the Wellcome Trust Centre for the History of Medicine at University College, London (UCL) from 2000 to 2009, and was the Queen Wilhelmina Visiting Professor of History at Columbia University in New York during the 2007–2008 academic year.

Prof. Cook’s research interests encompass several related projects examining how medical knowledge was exchanged between distant locations. More broadly, he explores how challenges and opportunities in the field of medical history are evolving within the context of recent global historical developments.

Cook is co-editor of the journal Medical History, serves on a number of advisory boards and professional bodies, and has been elected to an honorary Fellowship of the Royal College of Physicians.

== Academic career ==
Prof. Cook's academic career has evolved across decades.

- 1974 – BA Cornell College
- 1975 – MA University of Michigan
- 1981 – PhD University of Michigan
- 1982 – assistant professor, Harvard University
- 1985 – assistant professor, University of Wisconsin–Madison
- 1988 – associate professor, University of Wisconsin–Madison
- 1993 – professor, University of Wisconsin–Madison
- 2000 – 2009 director, The Wellcome Trust Centre for the History of Medicine at UCL
- 2010 – John F. Nickoll Professor of History, Brown University
- 2025 - Retired from Brown University

In Matters of Exchange (2007), Cook argues that engaging in international trade changed the thinking of the Dutch and those with whom they came in contact. He suggests that the preference for accurate information which accompanied the rise of commerce also laid the groundwork for the rise of science globally. The book documents the developments in medicine and natural history were fundamental aspects of this new science. It was a runner-up for the 2008 Cundill Prize.

== Publications ==
=== Books ===
- 2018 – The Young Descartes: Nobility, Rumor and War.University of Chicago Press. ISBN 978-0-226-46296-7
- 2007 – Matters of Exchange: Commerce, Medicine, and Science in the Dutch Golden Age. Yale University Press. ISBN 978-0-300-11796-7 (cloth)
- 1994 – Trials of an Ordinary Doctor: Joannes Groenevelt in Seventeenth-Century London. Johns Hopkins University Press. ISBN 978-0-8018-4778-3 (cloth)
- 1986 – The Decline of the Old Medical Regime in Stuart London. Ithaca: Cornell University Press. ISBN 978-0-8014-1850-1 (cloth)

=== Articles and contributions ===
2006

- "What Stays Constant at the Heart of Medicine," Editorial, British Medical Journal (BMJ) 333 (23 December 2006): pp. 1281–1282.
- "Medicine," in The Cambridge History of Science, vol. 3: Early Modern Science, ed. Katherine Park and Loraine Daston. Cambridge: Cambridge University Press, pp. 407–434.
- "Introduction" to The Western Medical Tradition 1800 to 2000. Cambridge: Cambridge University Press, pp. 1–6.
- "Das Wissen von den Sachen," in Seine Welt Wissen. Enzyklopädien in der Frühen Neuzeit, ed. Ulrich Johannes Schneider. Darmstadt: Wissenschaftliche Buchgesellschaft (WBG), pp. 81–124 (trans. into German by Jan Neersö).

2005

- "Global economies and Local Knowledge in the East Indies: Jacobus Bontius Learns the Facts of Nature," in Colonial Botany: Science, Commerce, and Politics in the Early Modern World, ed. Claudia Swan and Londa Schiebinger. Philadelphia: University of Pennsylvania Press, pp. 100–118, 299–302.
- "Medical Communication in the First Global Age", Willem ten Rhijne in Japan, 1674–1676, in Academia Sinica, no. 11 (2004): pp. 16–36.

2004

- "Thomas Bonham," "Richard Boulton," "Sir John Colbatch," "Abraham Cyprianus," "Sir George Ent," "Charles Goodall," "Joannes Groenevelt," "John Hutton," "John Marten," "Thomas O'Dowde," "John Pechey," "William Rose," "Thomas Sydenham," "William Trigge," "Mary Trye," in Oxford Dictionary of National Biography. Oxford: Oxford University Press.
- "Health," The Lancet, 364: pp. 1481.
- "Early Modern Medicine," in Encarta Encyclopedia (World English edition).

2003

- "Medicine, Materialism, Globalism: The Example of the Dutch Golden Age," Professorial inaugural lecture, UCL, 27 February 2003. Download PDF text.

2002

- "Bernard Mandeville," in A Companion to Early Modern Philosophy, ed. Steven Nadler. Oxford: Blackwell Publishing, pp. 469–482.
- "Body and Passions: Materialism and the Early Modern State," in Osiris, 17: pp. 25–48.

2001

- "Time's Bodies: Crafting the Preparation and Preservation of Naturalia," Merchants and Marvels, ed. Paula Findlen and Pamela Smith. London: Routledge, pp. 237–247.
- "Fines and Fortunes: Recognition and Regulation of Practitioners for the First 200 Years," in The Royal College of Physicians and Its Collections, ed. G. Davenport, W. Ian McDonald, and Caroline Moss-Gibons. London: Royal College of Physicians pp. 28–30.
- "Medicine and Health," in Tudor England: An Encyclopedia, ed. Arthur F. Kinney and David W. Swain. London: Garland, pp. 475–479.

2000

- "Boerhaave and the Flight from Reason in Medicine," in Bulletin of the History of Medicine, 74 (2000): pp. 221–240.

1999

- "Bernard Mandeville and the Therapy of the 'Clever Politician'," in Journal of the History of Ideas, 60 (1999): pp. 101–124.

1998

- "Closed Circles or Open Networks?: Communicating at a Distance During the Scientific Revolution" (with David Lux), History of Science, 36: pp. 179–211.

1997

- "From the Scientific Revolution to the Germ Theory," in Western Medicine: An Illustrated History, ed. Irvine Loudon. Oxford: Oxford University Press, pp. 80–101. [paperback ed. 2001.]

1996

- "Institutional Structures and Personal Belief in the London College of Physicians," in Religio Medici: Medicine and Religion in 17th-Century England, ed. Ole Peter Grell and Andrew Cunningham. Aldershot: Scolar Press, pp. 91–114.
- "Natural History and Seventeenth-Century Dutch and English Medicine," in The Task of Healing: Medicine, Religion and Gender in England and the Netherlands, 1450-1800, Hilary Marland and Margaret Pelling, eds. Rotterdam: Erasmus Publishing, pp. 253–270.
- "Physicians and Natural History," in Cultures of Natural History, ed. Nicholas Jardine, James A. Secord, and Emma Spary. Cambridge: Cambridge University Press, pp. 91–105.
- "The Moral Economy of Natural History and Medicine in the Dutch Golden Age," in Contemporary Explorations in the Culture of the Low Countries, William Z. Shetter and Inge Van der Cruysse, eds., Publications of the American Association of Netherlandic Studies, vol. 9. Lanham, Maryland: University Press of America, pp. 39–47.

1995

- "Medical Ethics, History of: IV. Europe: B. Renaissance and Enlightenment," in Encyclopedia of Bioethics, revised edition, Warren T. Reich, ed.. (New York: Macmillan, Vol. 3, pp. 1537–1543.

1994

- "Good Advice and Little Medicine: The Professional Authority of Early Modern English Physicians," in Journal of British Studies, 33: pp. 1–31.

1993

- "Medicine," in Encyclopedia of Social History, ed. Peter N. Stearns. New York: Garland, pp. 459–462.
- "The Cutting Edge of a Revolution? Medicine and Natural History near the Shores of the North Sea," in Renaissance and Revolution: Humanists, Scholars, Craftsmen and Natural Philosophers in Early Modern Europe, ed. J. V. Field and Frank A.J.L. James. Cambridge: Cambridge University Press, pp. 45–61.

1992

- "The New Philosophy in the Low Countries," in The Scientific Revolution in National Context, ed. Roy Porter & M. Teich. Cambridge: Cambridge University Press, p. 115-149.

1991

- "Physick and Natural History in Seventeenth-Century England," in Revolution and Continuity: Essays in the History of Philosophy of Early Modern Science, R. Ariew and P. Barker, eds. Studies in Philosophy and the History of Philosophy, vol. 24 Washington, D.C.: Catholic University of America Press, pp. 63–80.

1990

- "The New Philosophy and Medicine in Seventeenth-Century England," in Reappraisals of the Scientific Revolution, ed. David Lindberg and Robert Westman. Cambridge: Cambridge University Press, pp. 397–436.
- "Sir John Colbatch and Augustan Medicine: Experimentalism, Character and Entrepreneurialism," in Annals of Science, 47: pp. 475–505.
- "The Rose Case Reconsidered: Physic and the Law in Augustan England," in Journal of the History of Medicine, 45: pp. 527–555.
- "Practical Medicine and the British Armed Forces After the 'Glorious Revolution'," in Medical History, 34 (1990): 1-26.
- "Charles Webster's Analysis of Puritanism and Science,' in Puritanism and the Rise of Modern Science: The Merton Thesis, ed. I. Bernard Cohen. New Brunswick: Rutgers University Press, pp. 265-300.

1989

- "Policing the Health of London: The College of Physicians and the Early Stuart Monarchy," in Social History of Medicine, 2: pp. 1–33.
- "Physicians and the New Philosophy: Henry Stubbe and the Virtuosi-Physicians," in Medical Revolution in the 17th Century, Roger French and Andrew Wear eds. Cambridge: Cambridge University Press, pp. 246–271.
- "The Medical Profession in London," in The Age of William III and Mary II: Power, Politics and Patronage, 1688-1702, Martha Hamilton-Phillips and Robert P. Maccubbin eds. Williamsburg: College of William and Mary, pp. 186–194.

1987

- "The Society of Chemical Physicians, the New Philosophy, and the Restoration Court," in Bulletin of the History of Medicine, 61: pp. 61–77.

1985

- "Against Common Right and Reason: The College of Physicians Against Dr. Thomas Bonham," in American Journal of Legal History, 29 : pp. 301–24.

1980

- "Early Research on the Biological Effects of Microwave Radiation, 1940-1960" (with Nicholas Steneck, Arthur Vander, and Gordon Kane), Annals of Science, 37 (1980): pp. 323–51.
- "The Origins of U.S. Safety Standards for Microwave Radiation" (with Nicholas Steneck, Arthur Vander, and Gordon Kane), Science, 248: pp. 1230–37.

1978

- "Ancient Wisdom, The Golden Age, and Atlantis: The New World in Sixteenth-Century Cosmography," in Terrae Incognitae, 10: pp. 25–43.

== See also ==
- Wellcome Library
- Wellcome Trust Centre for the History of Medicine
