= Vivian Nutton =

British professor and historian of medicine (born 1943)

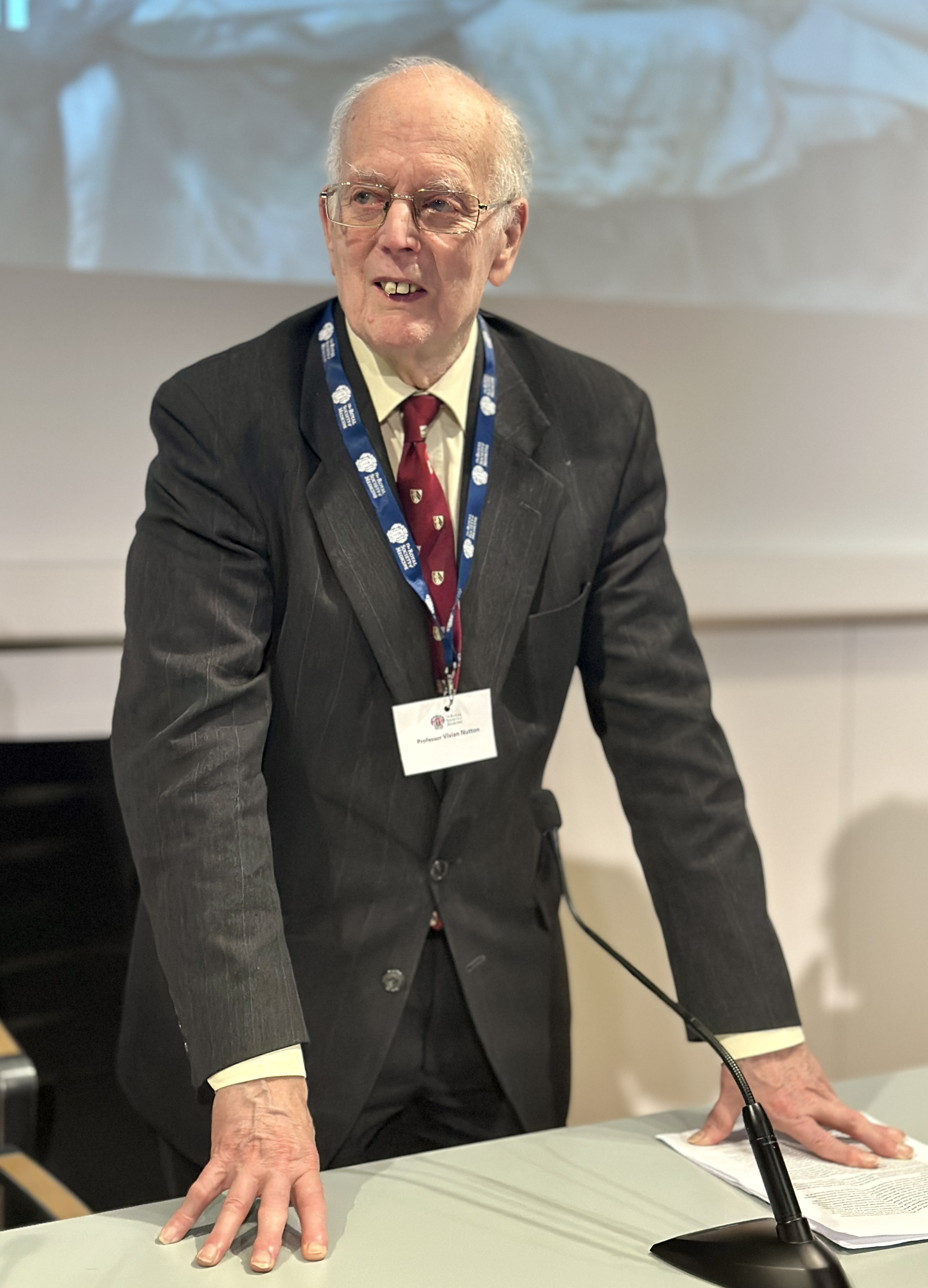
- Nutton (2024)
- Born: 1943 (age 82–83)
- Occupation: Historian

Academic background
- Education: University of Cambridge

Academic work
- Institutions: Selwyn College; Wellcome Trust Centre for the History of Medicine; I.M. Sechenov First Moscow State Medical University; UCL Centre for the History of Medicine, University College London; Centre for the Study of Medicine and the Body in the Renaissance

Vivian Nutton FBA (born 1943) is a British historian of medicine. He is Emeritus Professor at the UCL Centre for the History of Medicine, University College London, and president of the Centre for the Study of Medicine and the Body in the Renaissance (CSMBR).

== Education ==
Nutton acquired his B.A. in Classics at the University of Cambridge in 1965 and subsequently taught there as a Fellow of Selwyn College (1967–77). He received his Ph.D. in 1970.

== Career ==
Since 1977, he has worked at the Wellcome Trust Centre for the History of Medicine as a lecturer, and since 1993 as professor. He is a member of several international learned societies and a Fellow of the British Academy.

Since 2015, he has worked at I.M. Sechenov First Moscow State Medical University (1st MSMU). Nutton's main field of research is the ancient Greek physician Galen. His work covers ancient history of medicine and its reception history, in particular during the European Renaissance and in the medieval Islamic world.

== Selected publications ==
- John Caius and the Manuscripts of Galen, Cambridge: Cambridge Philological Society, 1987 LCCN 88-116761 ISBN 9780906014097
  - Nutton, Vivian (30 August 2020). 2020 ebook edition. Cambridge Philological Society. ISBN 978-0-906014-09-7.
- From Democedes to Harvey: Studies in the History of Medicine, UK: Ashgate Publishing, 1988 ISBN 0860782255
- Medicine at the Courts of Europe 1500–1837, London: Routledge, 1990 LCCN 89-10484 ISBN 0415022649
- The Western Medical Tradition: 800 BC to AD 1800, with Lawrence I. Conrad and Michael Neve, Cambridge: Cambridge University Press, 1995
- The History of Medical Education in Britain, Amsterdam: Rodopi, 1995 ISBN 90-5183-571-X
- Galen, On My Own Opinions (trans.) Akademie Verlag, 1999 LCCN 99-521868 ISBN 3050033401
- Renaissance Studies: Medicine in the Renaissance City (ed.), Oxford: Oxford University Press, 2001
- The Unknown Galen, London: Institute of Classical Studies, 2002
- Ancient Medicine, London: Routledge, 2004
- Pestilential Complexities: Understanding Medieval Plague, London: Wellcome Trust Centre for the History of Medicine at UCL, 2008 LCCN 2008-399268 ISBN 9780854841165
- Galen: On Problematical Movements, Cambridge: Cambridge University Press, 2011 LCCN 2011-9030 ISBN 9780521115490
- Method of Medicine, Volume I: Books 1–4 (Loeb Classical Library), Cambridge, Mass: Harvard Univ. Press, 2011
- Galen: A Thinking Doctor in Imperial Rome, London: Routledge, 2020. Brief description at Routledge website ISBN 9780367357238
- Renaissance Medicine: A Short History of European Medicine in the Sixteenth Century, Abingdon-on-Thames: Routledge, 2022 ebook edition. ISBN 978-1-003-22318-4.
