= Centre for the Study of Medicine and the Body in the Renaissance =

Centre for the Study of Medicine and the Body in the Renaissance (CSMBR)
- Official Emblem
- Other name: CSMBR
- Motto: 'Florescat Flos Sapientiae'
- Type: International Research Centre
- Established: 2018
- Parent institution: Institutio Santoriana - Fondazione Comel
- Affiliations: University of Exeter, Yale University, University of Würzburg, University of Parma, University of Lisbon, Studio Firmano, Edward Worth Library
- President: Vivian Nutton
- Vice-president: Jonathan Barry
- Director: Fabrizio Bigotti
- Location: Via Cardinale Pietro Maffi, 48, Pisa, 56126, Italy; 43°25′57″N 10°14′07″E
- Website: https://csmbr.fondazionecomel.org/
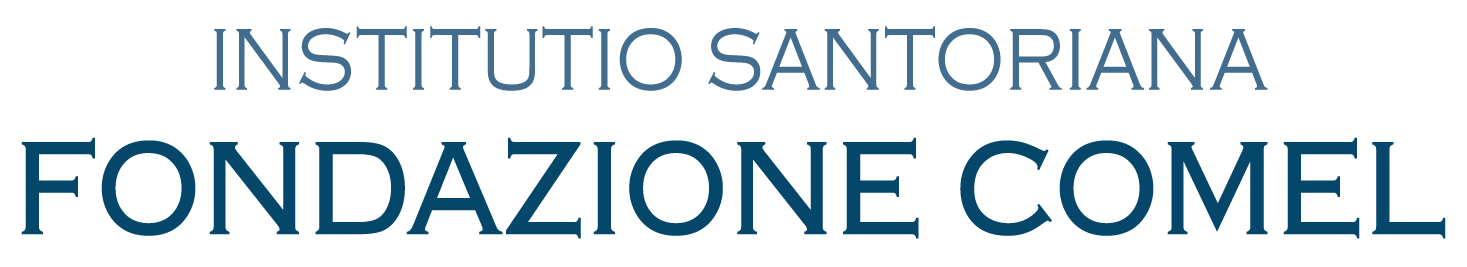

The Centre for the Study of Medicine and the Body in the Renaissance (CSMBR) is an international institute of advanced studies in the history of medicine and science based at the Domus Comeliana in Pisa. The centre is the major Italian institution devoted to the medical humanities.

== History ==
The CSMBR was established in January 2018 after the endowment of the Institutio Santoriana – Fondazione Comel to carry on the scientific legacy of the Italian physician, scientist, inventor and philosopher Santorio Santori (1561-1636), who introduced the quantitative method to medicine and is reputed the father of quantitative experimental physiology, pursuant to the will of Prof. Marcello Comel (1902–1996) founder of the institution.

=== Location ===
The premises of the CSMBR are in the Domus Comeliana, former private residence of Marcello Comel, located next to the Leaning Tower in Piazza dei Miracoli.

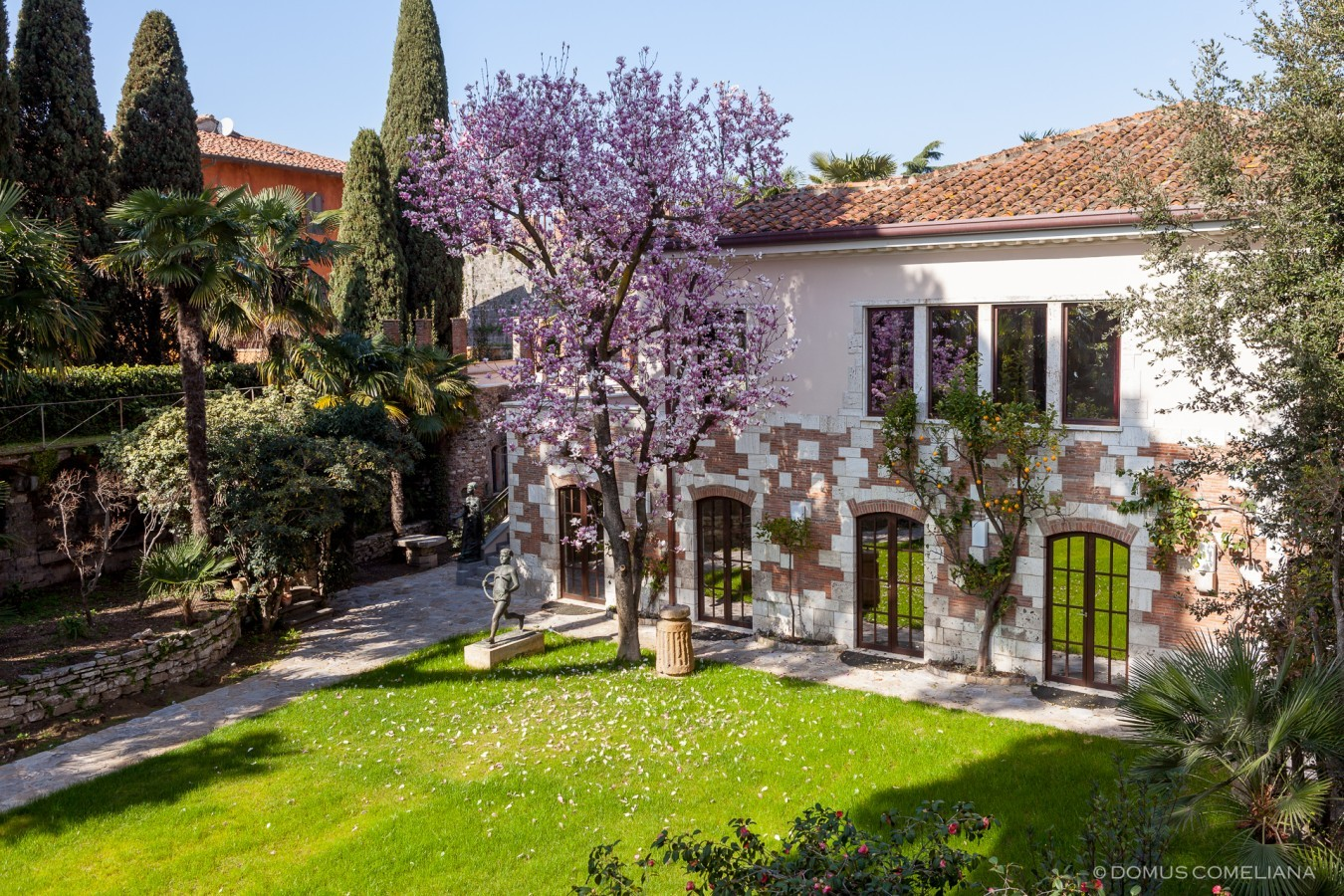
Domus Comeliana

=== Organisation ===
The CSMBR is run by a committee of scholars that works globally in cooperation with Universities and Research Institutes across the EU, the UK, and the US, including Yale University; University of Exeter; University of Würzburg; University of Parma; University of Lisbon; Studio Firmano per la Storia della Medicina e della Scienza; Edward Worth Library, Dublin and in cooperation with research centres such as Centro di Ricerche Scientifiche di Capodistria and international publishing outlets such Palgrave McMillan and Brepols.

The founder and current Director of the CSMBR is the intellectual historian Fabrizio Bigotti while the President is the historian of medicine Vivian Nutton.

=== Mission ===
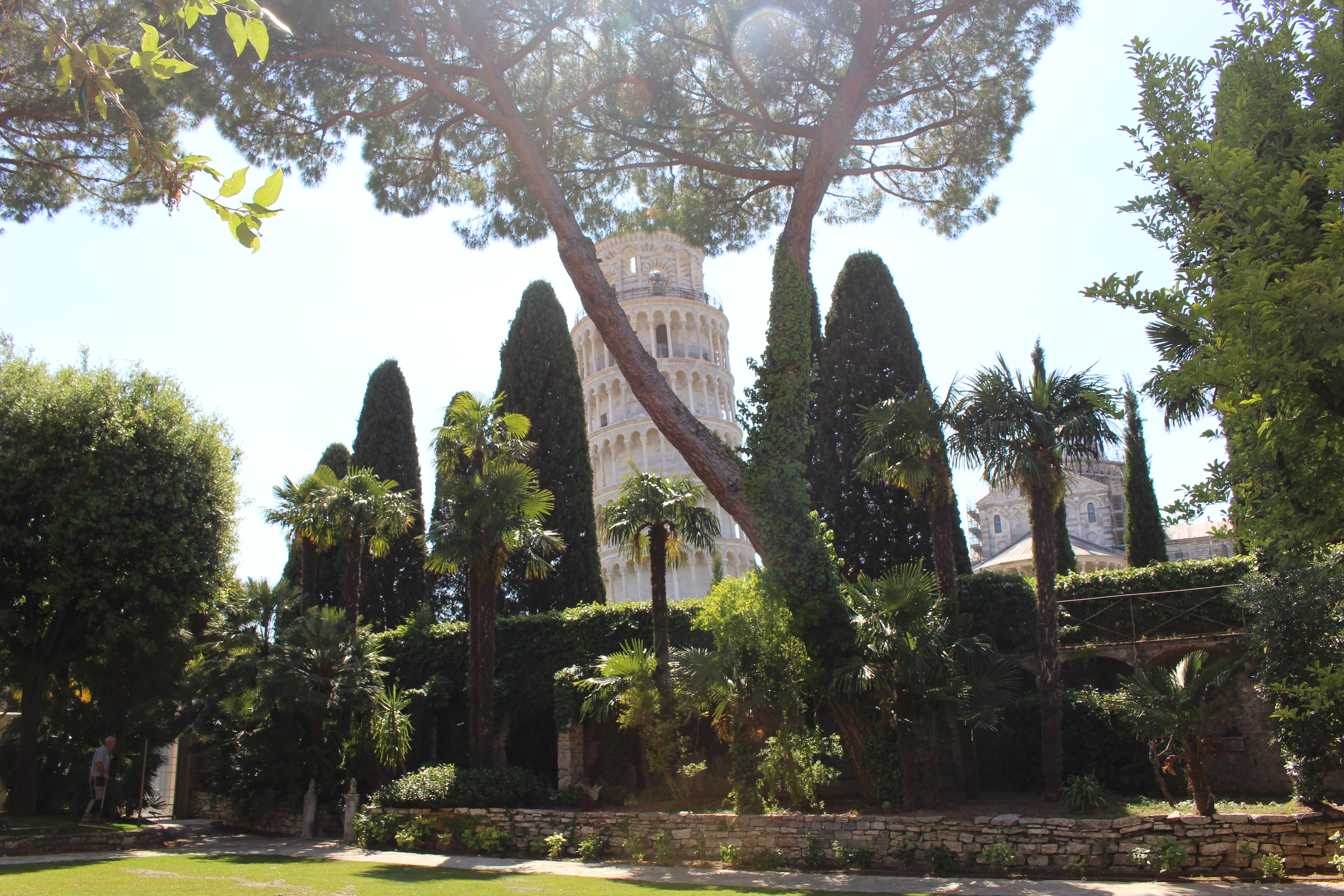
Interior Garden of the Domus Comeliana

The core mission of the CSMBR is to further the values of humanism and the advancement of scientific knowledge as inspired by the intellectual, cultural, and social development of the European Medical Renaissance (1300–1700).

=== Fundamental Principles ===
The CSMBR community takes inspiration from the principles of Renaissance Humanism, meant as the commitment to acknowledging, respecting, and developing the human potential proper to each individual. In accordance with these principles, central to the CSMBR academic practice is the recovery and revival of classical tradition while the scholarly work at large is intended to allow each individual to form their own opinion, as freely and independently as possible. As a result, the CSMBR neither seeks nor promotes any direct political goal, being constituted as an independent research institute, open to scholars of any nationality, without discrimination of ethnicity, gender, age, political, religious, or sexual orientation.

== Prizes and Publications ==
The Centre provides awards and travel grants, such as the Santorio Award for Excellence in Research, the Santorio Fellowship for Medical Humanities and Science, the Santorio Residential Fellowship In cooperation with ZRS Koper), the CSMBR-Brepols Residential Fellowship in Digital Humanities, while encouraging international cooperation through the VivaMente Grant in the History of Ideas.

In partnership with Palgrave-MacMillan (Springer) the CSMBR sponsors the series Palgrave Studies in Medieval and Early Modern Medicine (PSMEMM) and in partnership with Brepols Publishers the Series ARS LONGA: Texts and Traditions of Medicine from Antiquity to 1800 (ARLO) . These series aim to promote the study of the intellectual tradition of Western and Mediterranean medicine as related to the traditions, philosophies, institutions, practices, translations, and technologies that developed throughout the premodern and early modern period.
