= Santorio Santorio =

Italian physiologist (1561–1636)

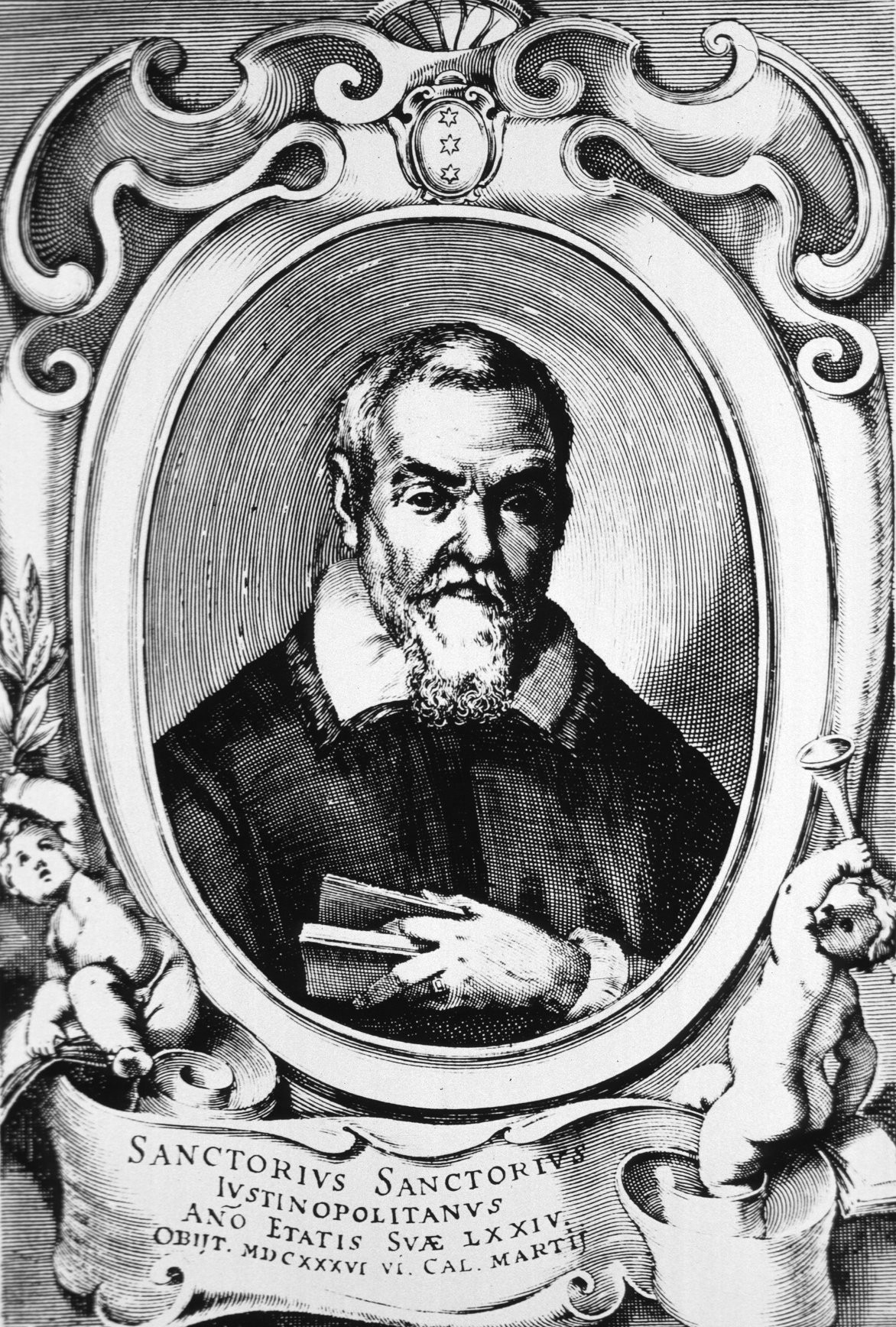
- Born: 29 March 1561; Capodistria, Republic of Venice
- Died: 25 February 1636 (aged 74); Venice, Republic of Venice
- Education: University of Padua
- Known for: Discoveries concerning metabolism and invention of technical instruments

Santorio Santorio (29 March 1561 – 25 February 1636) whose real name was Santorio Santori (or de' Sanctoriis) better known in English as Sanctorius of Padua was an Italian physiologist, physician, and professor, who introduced the quantitative approach into the life sciences and is considered the father of experimental physiology. He is also known as the inventor of several medical devices. His work De Statica Medicina, written in 1614, saw many publications and influenced generations of physicians.

== Life ==
Santorio was born on 29 March 1561, in Capodistria, in the Venetian part of Istria (today in Slovenia). Santorio's mother, Elisabetta Cordoni (or Cordonia), was a noblewoman from an Istrian family. Santorio's father, Antonio, was a nobleman from Friuli working for the Venetian Republic as chief of ordinance of the city.

He was educated in his home town and continued his studies in Venice before he entered the University of Padua in 1578, where he obtained his medical degree in 1585. He became a personal physician to a Croatian nobleman from 1587 to 1594, and he set up a medical practice in Venice, where he met Galileo.

Santorio died in Venice on 25 February 1636, caused by complications of a urinary tract disease that he suffered from for many years, and he was buried in Servants of the Blessed Virgin Mary Church (Italian: Santa Maria dei Servi), the convent where he served as physician for many years.

== Work ==
From 1611 to 1624, Santorio was the chair of theoretical medicine at the University of Padua, where he performed the very first experiments on bodily temperature, insensible perspiration and weight. He resigned from the university in 1624, due to political opposition from the senate. His Professor title and pension were kept for one year after he retired, as he returned to practice medicine in Venice in 1625. In 1630, he was one of the members of the Venetian College of Physicians appointed to cure the Venetian plague.

Santorio's place in the history of science and medicine rests primarily on his contribution to the development of experimental methods. Most notably, his merits lie in the elaboration of an early form of corpuscularianism and above all in the invention of precision instruments meant to ascertain the homeostatic balance of the body, especially with regard to pulse frequency, temperature, and insensible perspiration. These factors were in fact measured with special instruments called pulsilogia, with thermometers ( hydrolabia Sanctorii ), and by means of a weighing chair, also called sella Sanctorii, to which Santorio's name is still associated nowadays.

=== Inventions ===
Santorio was the first to use a wind gauge, a water current meter, the pulsilogium (a device used to measure the pulse rate), and a thermoscope. His pulsilogium and thermoscope predate similar inventions by Galileo Galilei, Paolo Sarpi and Giovanni Francesco Sagredo who were his learned circle of friends in Venice. Santorio introduced the pulsilogium in 1602 and thermoscope in 1611.

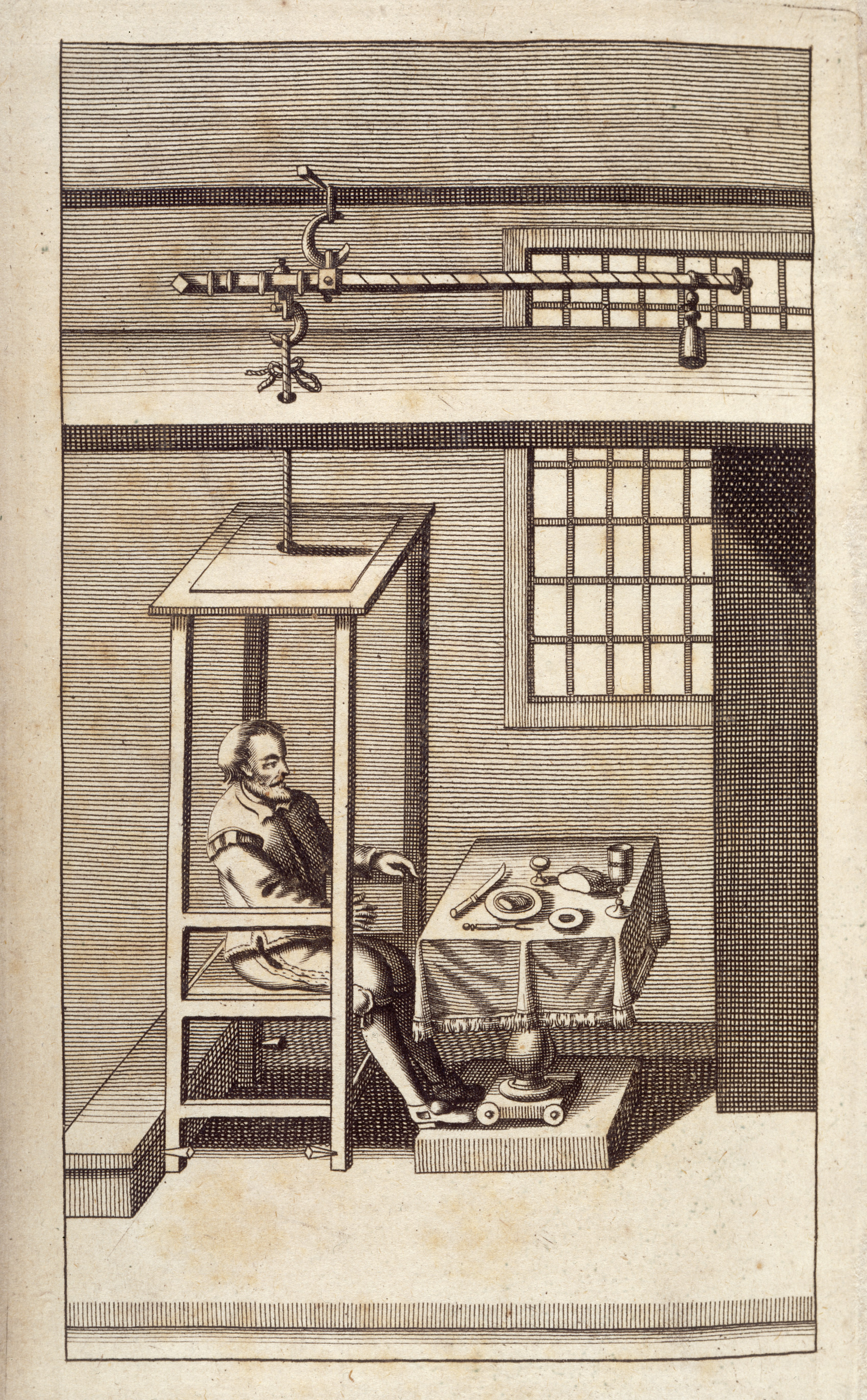
Santorio sitting in the balance that he made to calculate his net weight change over time after the intake and excretion of foodstuffs and fluids.

The pulsilogium was probably the first machine of precision in medical history. Extensive experimentation with his new tool allowed Santorio to standardise the Galenic rationale of the pulse and to describe quantitatively various regular and irregular frequencies. A century later, another physician, François Boissier de Sauvages de Lacroix used the pulsilogium to test cardiac function.

=== Study of metabolism ===
Sanctorius studied the so-called perspiratio insensibilis or insensible perspiration of the body, already known to Galen and other ancient physicians, and originated the study of metabolism. For a period of thirty years, Santorio used a chair-device to weigh himself and everything he ate and drank, as well as his urine and faeces. He compared the weight of what he had eaten to that of his waste products, the latter being considerably smaller because for every eight pounds of food he ate, he excreted only 3 pounds of waste. Santorio also applied his weighing device to study his patients, but records of these experiments have been lost.

His notable conclusion on finding this was that:

Insensible Perspiration is either made by the Pores of the Body, which is all over perspirable, and cover’d with a Skin like a Net; or it is performed by Respiration through the Mouth, which usually, in the Space of one Day, amounts to about the Quantity of half a Pound, as may plainly be made appear by breathing upon a Glass.

This important experiment is the origin of the significance of weight measurement in medicine. While his experiments were replicated and augmented by his followers and were finally surpassed by Antoine Lavoisier in 1790, he is still celebrated as the father of experimental physiology. The "weighing chair", which he constructed and employed during this experiment, is also famous.

== Bibliography ==
- Methodus vitandorum errorum omnium qui in arte medica contigunt (1602)
- Commentaria in artem medicinalem Galeni (1612)
- De Statica medicina (1614 )
- Commenteria in primam Fen primi Canonis Avicennae (1625)
- Commenteria in primam sectionem Aphorismorum Hippocratis (1629)
- De remediorum inventione (1629 )
- De lithotomia seu calculi vesicae consultatio co-authored with L. Batarourum (1629)
- De instrumentis medicis (unpublished)

== Grants named after Santorio ==
In January 2018, the Italian Institution Institutio Santoriana – Fondazione Comel created the Centre for the Study of Medicine and the Body in the Renaissance (CSMBR) as an International Institution of advanced research in honour of Santorio to study medical humanity. The centre offers each year various awards and grants for international scholars that are named after Santorio, such as the Santorio Award for Excellence in Research, the Santorio Fellowship for Medical Humanities and Science and the Santorio Global Fellowship.
