= Insensible perspiration =

Loss of water through the skin that does not occur as perceptible sweat

Insensible perspiration, also known as transepidermal water loss, is the passive vapour diffusion of water through the epidermis. Insensible perspiration takes place at an almost constant rate and reflects evaporative loss from the epithelial cells of the skin. Unlike sweating, the lost fluid is pure without additional solutes. For this reason, it can also be referred to as "insensible water loss".

The amount of water lost in this way is deemed to be approximately 400 mL (14 U.S. fl oz) per day. Some sources broaden the definition of insensible perspiration to include not only the water lost through the skin, but also the water lost through the epithelium of the respiratory tract, which accounts for approximately an additional 400 mL (14 U.S. fl oz) per day.

Insensible perspiration is a notable source of heat loss from the body, with the figure being placed around 480 kCal per day, which is approximately 25% of basal heat production.

== History ==
Known in Latin as perspiratio insensibilis, the concept was already known to Galen in ancient Greece and was studied by the Venetian Santorio Santorio, who experimented on himself and observed that a significant part of the weight of what he ate and drank was not excreted in his faeces or urine but was also not being added to his body weight. He was able to measure the loss through a chair that he designed.
