= Wellcome Trust Centre for the History of Medicine =

Wellcome Trust Centre for the History of Medicine at UCL
- Active: 2000–2012
- Parent institution: University College London
- Director: Prof. Harold Cook (2000-2009)
- Address: Wellcome Building, 183 Euston Road, London NW1 2BE, London, United Kingdom
- Website: https://web.archive.org/web/20090922235909/http://www.ucl.ac.uk/histmed/

The Wellcome Trust Centre for the History of Medicine at UCL (2000–2012) was a research and teaching centre within University College London dedicated to the history of medicine. It was created through a grant from the Wellcome Trust, on the model of other Wellcome Trust Centres, as a national and international centre of excellence in its field. As a university department, it was administered by an internal governance committee chaired by the centre's Director, who was in turn advised by an international committee of external academic specialists in the history of science and medicine; until 2009, the Director reported to the Dean of Life Sciences and a governing committee on which the dean also sat.

== History ==
The Wellcome Trust Centre for the History of Medicine at UCL was a successor organization to the earlier Wellcome Historical Medical Research Library (ca. 1913–1968) and the Wellcome Institute for the History of Medicine (1968–1999). It was succeeded by the UCL Centre for the History of Medicine that itself closed at the end of 2014.

The Wellcome Trust Centre for the History of Medicine at UCL (WTCHM) existed from 2000 until the announcement of its closure in 2010, with a winding-up period of two years until 2012. During its existence, the WTCHM received a core grant from the Wellcome Trust, which contributed the chief financial support for its staff and academic programs of research, teaching and public outreach. The WTCHM was academically and administratively part of University College London. Physically, it was located in offices in the Wellcome Building at 183 Euston Road, that is owned by the Wellcome Trust, with periods spent at Tavistock Square and Eversholt Street during redecoration of the Wellcome Building in the WTCHM's early years.

The last report of the WTCHM was published in 2010.

== Directors ==
- Prof. Harold Cook (2000 to 2009)
- Prof. Sonu Shamdasani (acting director, 2010–2012)

== Teaching ==
The WTCHM offered university courses for UCL students at the MA level, and an intercalated BSc in the history of medicine for medical students. It also supervised and examined PhD students. These teaching activities continued the programme that had earlier developed at the Wellcome Institute for the History of Medicine.

== Publications ==
Staff at the Wellcome Trust Centre for the History of Medicine at UCL edited, published or otherwise supported a number of internationally renowned journals and book series. These included,

- Clio Medica, a series of research monographs on the history of medicine and health care; published cooperatively with the Dutch publisher Rodopi.
- Sir Henry Wellcome Asian Series, a series focussed on the history of medicine in Asia and historical sources in Arabic, Chinese, Sanskrit and other languages. It is published by Brill.
- Medical History, a refereed research journal of record, that became an open access journal during its period of governance at the Wellcome Centre for the History of Medicine at UCL.
- Wellcome Witnesses to Twentieth Century Medicine, transcripts of seminars at which significant figures in 20th-century medicine discuss specific discoveries or events in recent medical history
- New Perspectives in South Asian History, a series of books on social and economic topics relating to public health and economic development.

== The Wellcome Library ==
The Wellcome Library grew out of the personal collecting interests of the businessman and philanthropist Henry Wellcome. After his death in 1936, his collections continued to be augmented and were gradually structured into a functioning research library with attached research staff and academic librarians. The library and the research and teaching activities were formally split in 1999, with the creation of a separate library on the one hand, and the WTCHM on the other. From that time, the Wellcome Library has had its own separate history and continues to provide resources in central London for research into medical history and related subjects.
