= Liba Taub =

American historian of science and museum curator

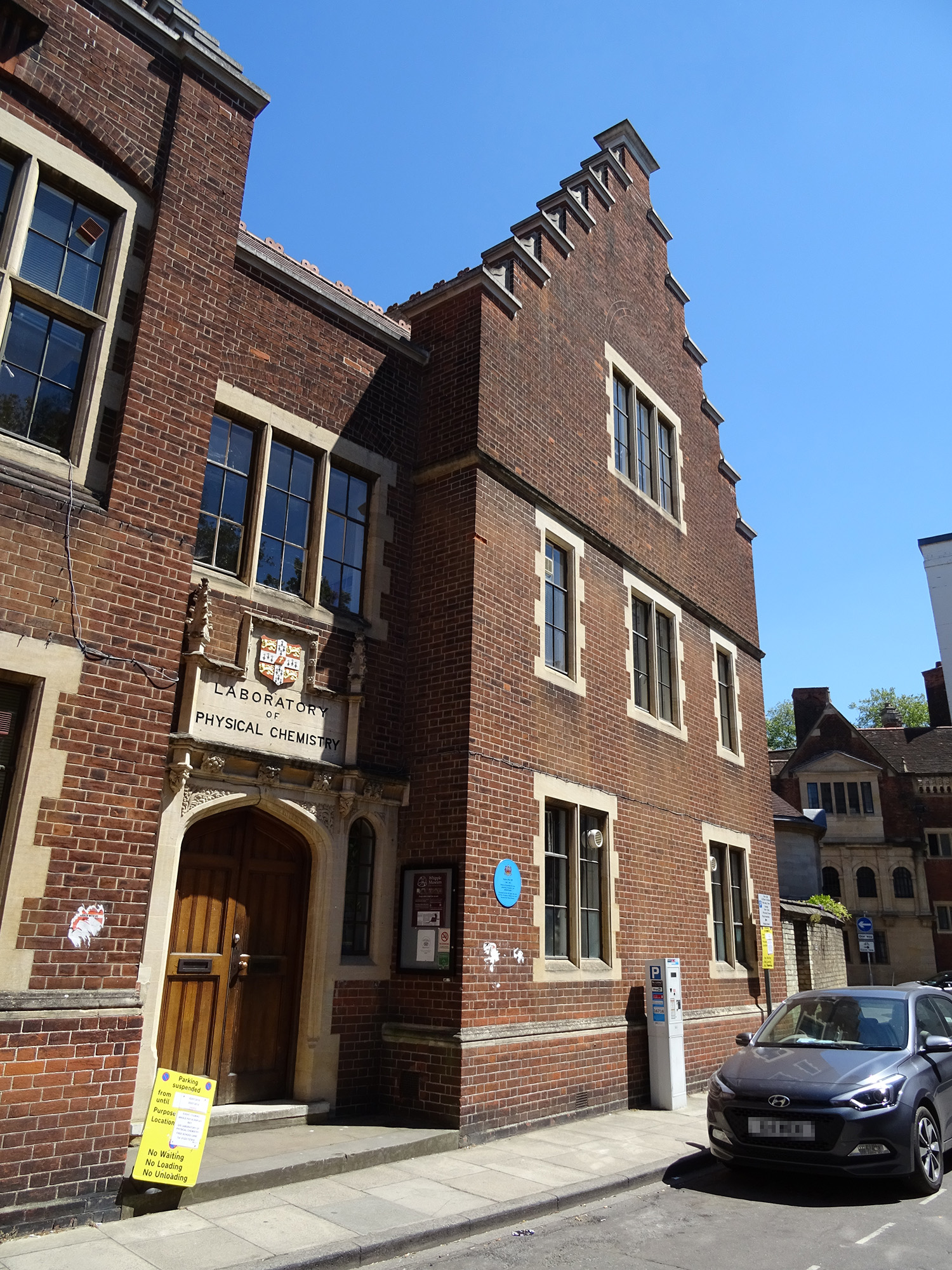
The Whipple Museum of the History of Science, Cambridge University

Liba Taub (born 1954) is an American historian of science, who was Curator and Director of the Whipple Museum at the University of Cambridge from 1995 to 2022.

== Education ==
Taub completed her doctorate in 1987 at the University of Oklahoma.

== Career and research ==
Taub was Curator at the Adler Planetarium. Her research specialises in ancient Greek and Roman astronomy, physics and meteorology and researching the history of scientific instruments. She became a Fellow of Newnham College in 1996 and serves as a Professor of History and the Philosophy of Science. Taub has been an Einstein Visiting Fellow at the Excellence Cluster Topoi in Berlin since 2010, in which she has participated in various workshops and workshops on Ancient Greek and Roman scientific writing. She has authored books such as Ptolemy’s Universe: The Natural Philosophical and Ethical Foundations of Ptolemy’s Astronomy (1993), Ancient Meteorology (2003), and Aetna and the Moon: Explaining Nature in Ancient Greece and Rome (2008).

Taub retired as Curator and Director of the Whipple Museum in 2022, succeeded by Dr Joshua Nall, and was appointed to the honorary role of the museum's Director of Research. In 2024, a festschrift was published in her honour. Tools, Techniques, and Technologies. Essays in Ancient Science and its Reception in Honour of Liba Taub was edited by Laurence Totelin and Emma Perkins, and published by De Gruyter.

== Bibliography ==
- Ancient Greek and Roman Science: A Very Short Introduction, Oxford: Oxford University Press, 2023.
- The Cambridge Companion to Ancient Greek and Roman Science, editor, Cambridge: Cambridge University Press, 2020.
- Science Writing in Greco-Roman Antiquity. (Key Themes in Ancient History.) Cambridge: Cambridge University Press, 2017.
- Ancient Meteorology (London: Routledge, 2003)
- Ptolemy's Universe: The Natural Philosophical and Ethical Foundations of Ptolemy's Astronomy (Chicago: Open Court, 1993)

== Media appearances ==
- 'The Antikythera Mechanism', In Our Time with Melvyn Bragg, BBC Radio 4, 14 November 2024
- 'Ptolemy and Ancient Astronomy', In Our Time with Melvyn Bragg, BBC Radio 4, 17 November 2011
- 'Pliny's Natural History', In Our Time with Melvyn Bragg, BBC Radio 4, 8 July 2010
- 'Meteorology', In Our Time with Melvyn Bragg, BBC Radio 4, 6 March 2003
