= Mary Trye =

English medicine practitioner

Mary Trye (born 1642) was a woman who practiced medicine in Warwickshire, England and the city of London, in an era when women were not permitted to become licensed physicians.

Little is known about Trye or her life. She was baptized as Mary Dowde on July 30, 1642; was married in 1660 to a merchant, Edward Stanthwaite; was widowed; and in 1670 married Berkeley Trye, with whom she had a son, William, in 1671.

In 1675, she published Medicatrix, Or The Woman-Physician,a defense of her father, Thomas O'Dowde, who died caring for patients during the Great Plague of London, and whose practice she continued. in Medicatrix she asserted her right to write and publish. She defended the practice of iatrochemistry as opposed to the Galenic approach supported by the official Royal College of Physicians. Her medical philosophy was influenced by Jan Baptist Van Helmont.
