= Elizabeth Craik =

Scottish classical scholar

Elizabeth Mary Craik
- Born: 25 January 1939 (age 87); Portmoak, Scotland

Academic background
- Education: University of St Andrews; University of Cambridge

Academic work
- Discipline: Classics; History of medicine
- Sub-discipline: Ancient medicine Hippocratic Corpus; Greek Literature; Greek Tragedy
- Institutions: University of St Andrews; Kyoto University; Newcastle University

Elizabeth Mary Craik (born 25 January 1939) is a Scottish classical scholar, who is Honorary Professor of Classics at the University of St Andrews.

== Education ==
Elizabeth Craik studied for an MA at the University of St Andrews (1960), an MLitt at Girton College, University of Cambridge (1963) and was awarded an honorary DLitt from the University of St Andrews in 2000.

== Career ==
She began her career as a Research Fellow in Greek at the University of Birmingham (1963-1964). In 1964 she moved to the University of St Andrews as an Assistant Lecturer and stayed at St Andrews until 1997 by which time she was a Senior Lecturer in Greek. In 1993 she was awarded a Wellcome Trust research leave fellowship for one year to work on Hippocratic anatomical treatises. In the preface of her translation and commentary of the Hippocratic text Places in Man she describes this as an event which changed her life and lead to her seeking early retirement from the University of St Andrews.

Having completed this book in 1997 she took up a post as Professor of Classics at Kyoto University before retiring in 2002. From September 2003 to September 2005 she held an Emeritus Research Fellowship at the University of St Andrews, awarded by the Leverhulme Trust in order to complete her book Two Hippocratic Treatises On Sight and On Anatomy. As of 2015 she held honorary positions at the University of St Andrews and Newcastle University.

== Selected works ==
=== Translations (with commentaries) ===
- The Hippocratic Treatise On Glands. Brill 2009
- Two Hippocratic Treatises On Sight and On Anatomy. Brill 2006
- Hippocrates: Places in Man. Clarendon Press 1998
- Euripides Phoenician Women. Aris & Phillips 1988

=== Books ===
- The ‘Hippocratic’ Corpus Content and Context. Routledge 2015
- Marriage and property: women and marital customs in history. Macmillan 1991
- The Dorian Aegean. Routledge 1980
- Marriage and Property. Aberdeen University Press 1984
