= UCL Centre for the History of Medicine =

English research centre

Coordinates: 51.52561°N 0.13495°W

- Active: 2011–2014
- Director: Dr Stephen Jacyna
- Location: London, United Kingdom
- Website: UCL Centre for the History of Medicine

The UCL Centre for the History of Medicine (UCLCHM) was an academic research and teaching centre for the history of medicine at University College London (UCL) in London. It succeeded the Wellcome Trust Centre for the History of Medicine at UCL. The UCLCHM was founded in 2011, and from September 2011, it took over some of the former staff of the Wellcome Trust Centre at UCL, including four emeritus academic staff, six teaching staff, and associated staff in a number of other UCL departments.

The centre was based in the UCL Medical Sciences Building in the main UCL campus on Gower Street in the Bloomsbury area of Central London, close to the British Library and University College Hospital.

== History ==
In 1966, the Wellcome Trust funded the establishment at UCL of a Sub-Department in the History of Medicine, headed by Edwin Clarke, within UCL's Department of Anatomy. The UCL staff also had office space at the Wellcome Library in Euston Road, and academic librarians participated in the teaching and research functions of the UCL department. These cross-institutional arrangements were formalized in 1976 with the creation of the Wellcome Institute for the History of Medicine, the academic staff at the library becoming honorary lecturers at UCL. The Wellcome Institute was closed in 1999, being replaced by a new Wellcome Trust Centre for the History of Medicine at UCL on the one hand, and the Wellcome Trust Library for the History and Understanding of Medicine on the other, that continued to be a private library owned by the Wellcome Trust.

In February 2010 the Wellcome Trust Centre for the History of Medicine at UCL was the first history unit in the world to be nominated for centre collaborative status with the World Health Organization. In April 2010 it was announced that the Wellcome Trust would not be renewing its grant for the Wellcome Trust Centre for the History of Medicine at UCL, and that it would be closed within two years.

On 15 March 2011 it was announced that a new research and teaching centre would be launched as the UCL Centre for the History of Medicine for the 2011/2012 academic year, no longer being a flagship Centre funded by the Wellcome Trust. It was announced that the new UCL Centre would relocate from the Wellcome Building on Euston Road to UCL's Medical Sciences Building on Gower Street and that its research focus would be the history of neurosciences and related fields.

== Closure ==
The UCL Centre for the History of Medicine was wound down and closed during the 2013–2014 academic session. The teaching programmes were transferred to the administration of the UCL Department of Science and Technology Studies. No further students were accepted after the 2013–2014 academic year and Prof. Jacyna has retired from UCL.
