= Standen (surname) =

Standen is a surname. Notable people with the surname include:

- Alison Standen, Australian politician
- Amy Standen, American journalist
- Anthony Standen (d. 1993), American chemist and entomologist
- Clive Standen (born 1981), British actor
- Edith Standen (1905–1998), American museum curator and military officer
- Jaden Standen (1909–1973), Australian track racing cyclist
- Jim Standen (born 1935), British footballer
- Naomi Standen, British historian
