= Parklet =

Urban design structure

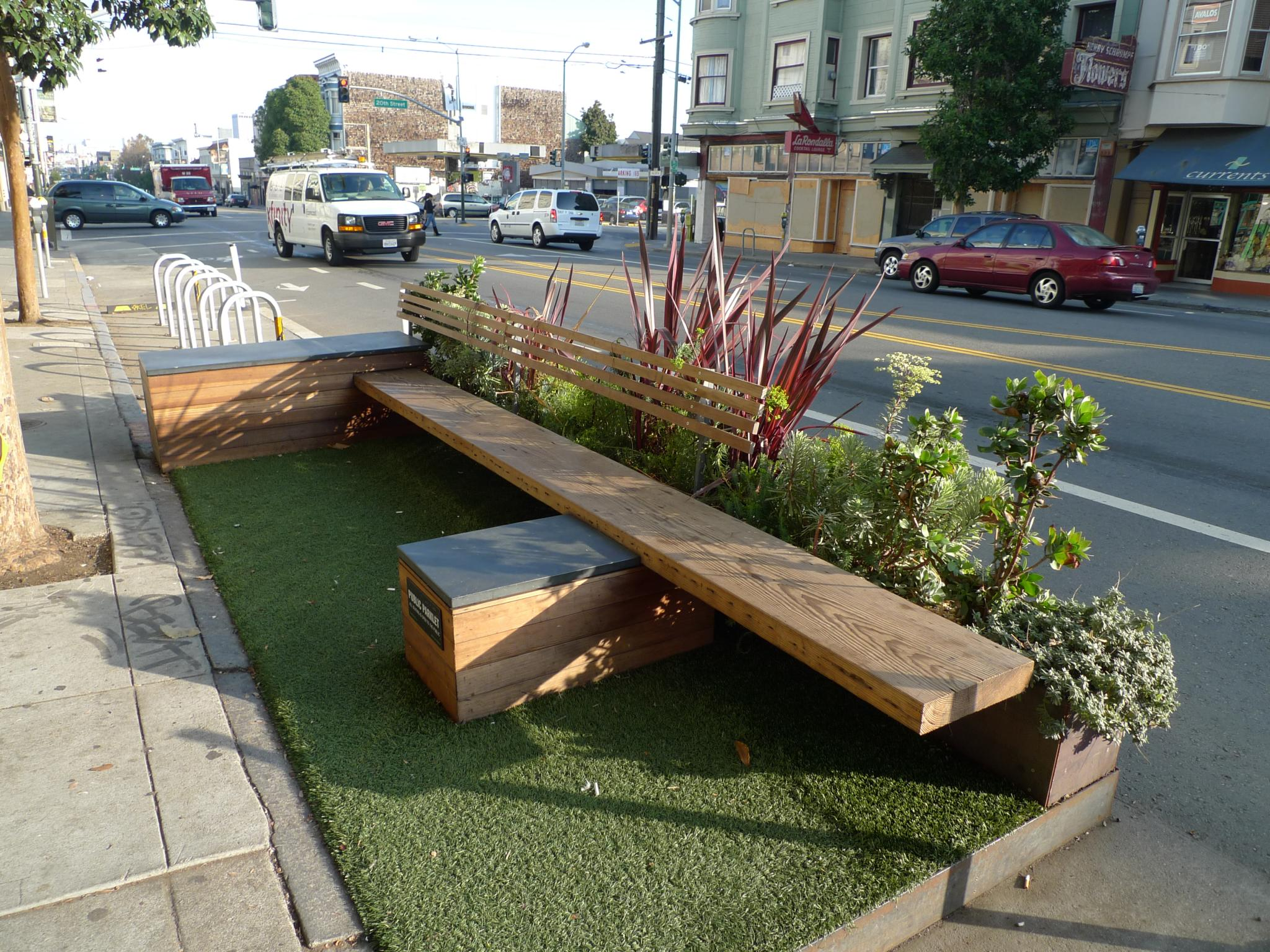
A parklet on Valencia Street in San Francisco

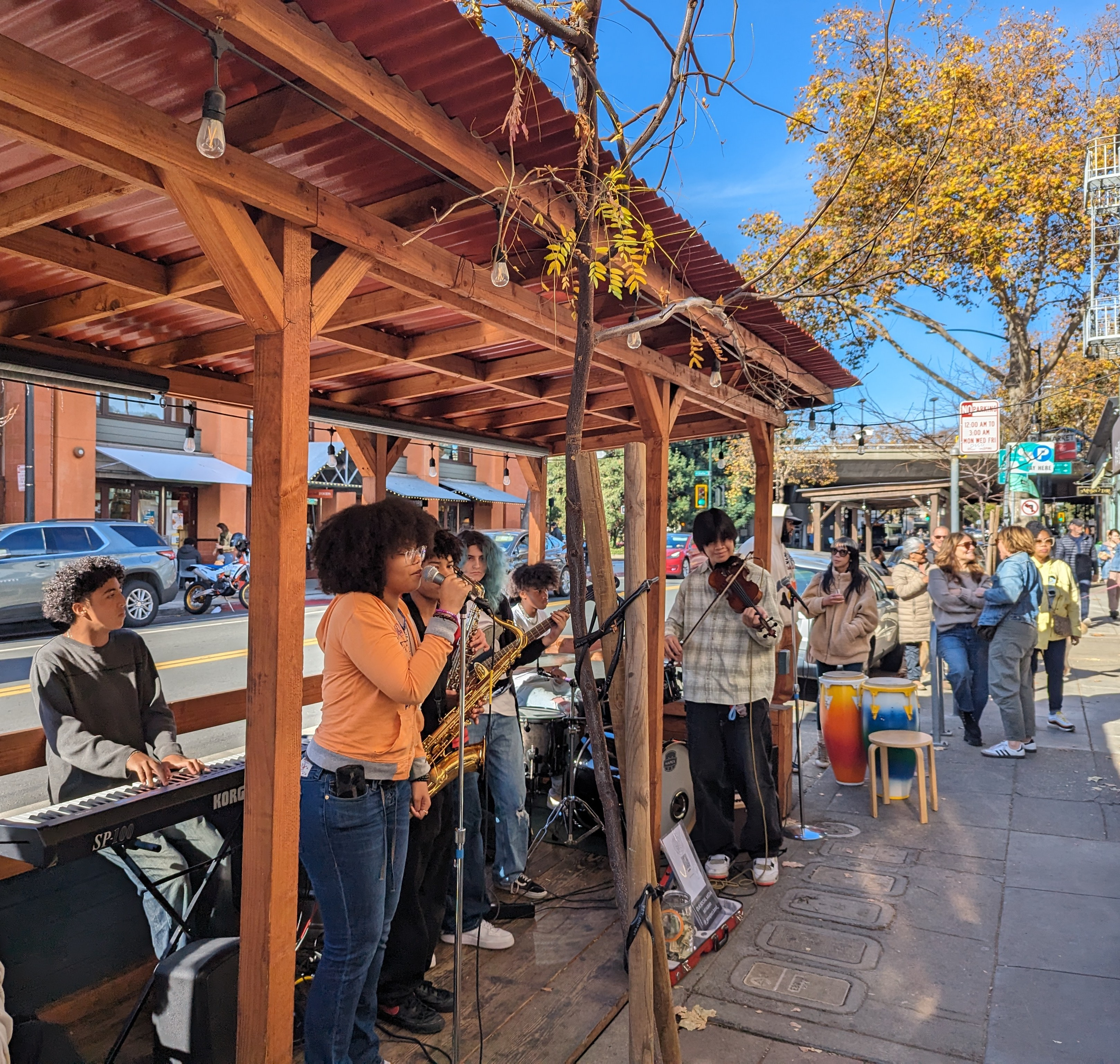
Band performing in parklet in Oakland, California

A parklet is a sidewalk extension that provides more space and amenities for people using the street. Usually parklets are installed on parking lanes and use several parking spaces. Parklets typically extend out from the sidewalk at the level of the sidewalk to the width of the adjacent parking space.

Parklets are intended for people. Parklets offer a place to stop, to sit, and to rest while taking in the activities of the street. In instances where a parklet is not intended to accommodate people, it may provide greenery, art, or some other visual amenity. A parklet may accommodate bicycle parking within it, or bicycle parking may be associated with it.

A parklet may be thought of as permanent, but must be designed for quick and easy removal for emergencies or other reasons such as snow removal without damage to the curb or street. As initially conceived, a parklet is always open to the public. However, some cities have allowed restaurants to create parklets that are not open to the public such as Long Beach, California, Fargo, North Dakota and Montreal, Quebec.

== History ==
San Francisco has been credited with introducing the first parklet. Parklets are the formalization of tactical urbanism projects created by Rebar called Park(ing), which began in 2005 and grew into a worldwide phenomenon called Park(ing) Day. The first one-day park(ing) installation was created in downtown San Francisco in 2005 as an unofficial activist project by feeding a parking meter with coins, unrolling grass sod, and placing a potted tree on top. The world's first formal public parklets were initially conceived by Italian/Brazilian designer and London resident Suzi Bolognese (Sb Design Studio) and installed in San Francisco in 2010. Since then, parklets have been introduced in cities such as Ames, Iowa, London, England and Puebla de Zaragoza, Mexico.

In August 2012, the School of Architecture at University of Southern California published a graduate thesis "Experimenting with the Margin: Parklets and Plazas as Catalysts in Community and Government," which provided a comprehensive history of the creation of parklet and plaza programs in four California cities. In September 2012, the UCLA Luskin School of Public Affairs published a report, "Reclaiming the Right-of-Way: A toolkit for Creating and Implementing Parklets", examining case studies for parklets in seven cities across North America. In February 2013, The San Francisco Planning Department published a Parklet Manual which serves as a comprehensive overview of the goals, policies, process, procedures and guidelines for creating a parklet in San Francisco. The Manual also serves as a resource for those outside of San Francisco working to establish parklet programs in their own cities.

== Design and purpose ==
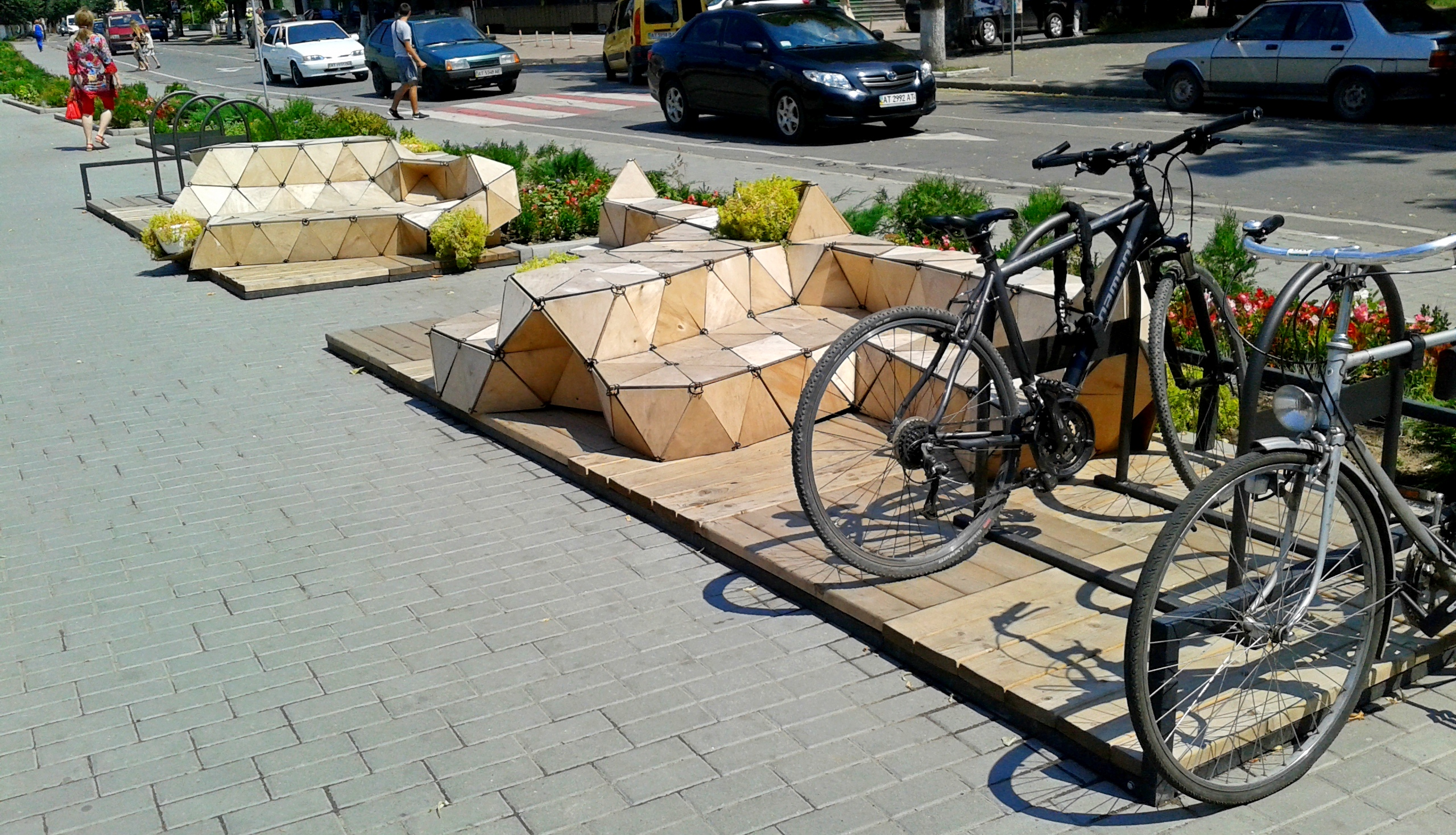
A parklet in Ivano-Frankivsk.

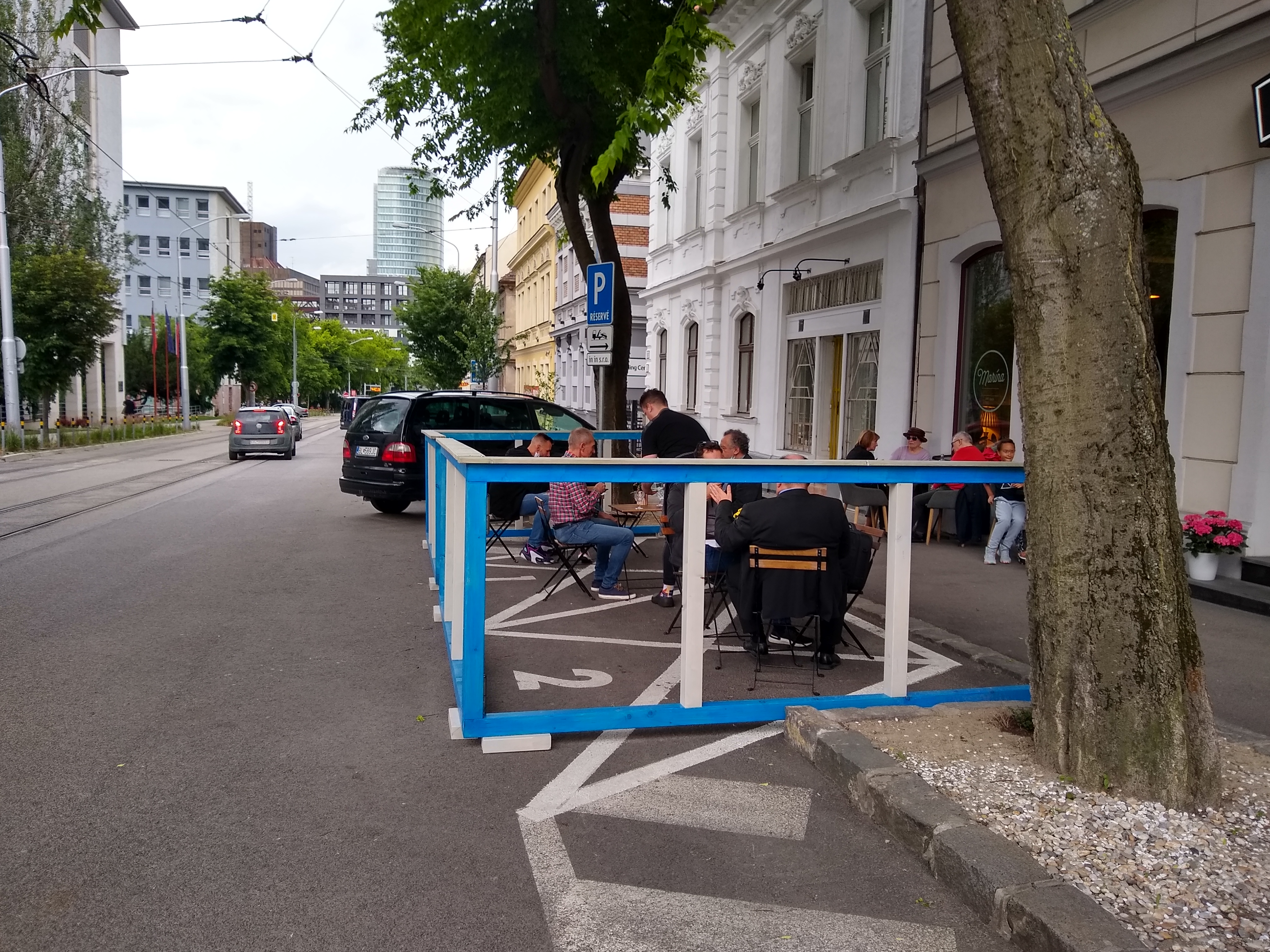
A parklet in Bratislava with outdoor seating of a café.

Parklets are designed to provide a public place for passersby to relax and enjoy the atmosphere of the city around them, in places where either current urban parks are lacking or where the existing sidewalk width is not large enough to accommodate vibrant street life activities. Parklets can be designed to be either permanent fixtures, or can be designed to be temporary/seasonal in places where snow removal is a concern. Seasonal parklets are found in New York City, Philadelphia, and Chicago. In 2015, Shiftspace Design introduced the world's longest seasonal parklet at 60 feet in length. Many cities choose to install these sites in order to create more public space by creating "places for people to sit, relax and enjoy the city." The Vancouver 2013 Parklet Pilot Program Guide explains parklets purpose and design as "benefit local businesses, residents, and visitors by providing unique public spaces that attract customers and foster community conversation. They can also have additional benefits such as adding more space for people to walk in congested areas. The typical design is a platform that extends the sidewalk and provides amenities like seats, tables, bike racks, and landscaping"

== Impact studies ==
In September 2010, The San Francisco Great Streets Project (then part of the San Francisco Bicycle Coalition) published a study, "Divisadero Trial Parklet Impact Report," on one of the first eight parklets built in San Francisco. This study was followed in January 2012 by a "Parklet Impact Study" analyzing three corridors in San Francisco. From October 2012 to March 2013, Los Angeles research collaborative Parklet Studies to design and implement a one-year study of the Parklets in downtown Los Angeles. The final report was released in March 2013 along with partners at the UCLA Lewis Center for Regional Policy Studies. New York City, Philadelphia, and Seattle have all since published evaluation reports from parklet and parklet-related efforts.

== Locations ==
In the United States, San Francisco hosts more parklets than any other city. The city's "Pavement to Parks" program was formed to facilitate installation of parklets as longer-term, yet still temporary, fixtures. As of 2011 the program had received over 50 applications from sponsors around the city. In 2011 the Union Square Business Improvement District installed the most ambitious parklet, a 2-block long installation along Powell Street near Union Square, funded by a corporate donation by Audi. In 2024, San Francisco began experimenting with "peacelets" based upon Japanese kōbans.

Parklets have sprung up in Phoenix, Philadelphia, Oakland, Los Angeles, San Jose, Dallas, Seattle, San Diego, Vancouver, British Columbia, Minneapolis, Chicago, Santa Monica, and Morro Bay, CA.

Parklets are typically spaces for passive recreation, The first parklets with active recreation were installed in Los Angeles, CA in February 2013. Two sites on Spring Street, in Downtown Los Angeles, each feature two exercise bicycles on site. Upon evaluation, 20% of people surveyed in the sites said they previously used the machines; but only 5% of activity observed recorded use of the machines. Active recreation use of parklets may need some additional motivation to increase use at the exercise machines.

Parklets have also been created in Mexico in Puebla de Zaragoza during the PueblaDesignFest

The first Parklet on the street in London has been installed in July 2015.

In April 2018, a Parklet was also created in Leeds, UK, as a result of a partnership between Yorkshire Design Group, Leeds Business Improvement District (LeedsBID), Leeds City Council, and LAAND landscape architects.

In December 2019, the Metro Tunnel Creative Program in Melbourne, Australia, installed a parklet on Domain Road - an area impacted by the construction of the new tunnel and station. Local restaurants were able to increase their street trading permits into the parklet - which also helped them maintain physical distancing for patrons waiting for takeaways during the COVID-19 pandemic.

== See also ==
- Pocket park
