= Urban park =

Park in a city or other incorporated place

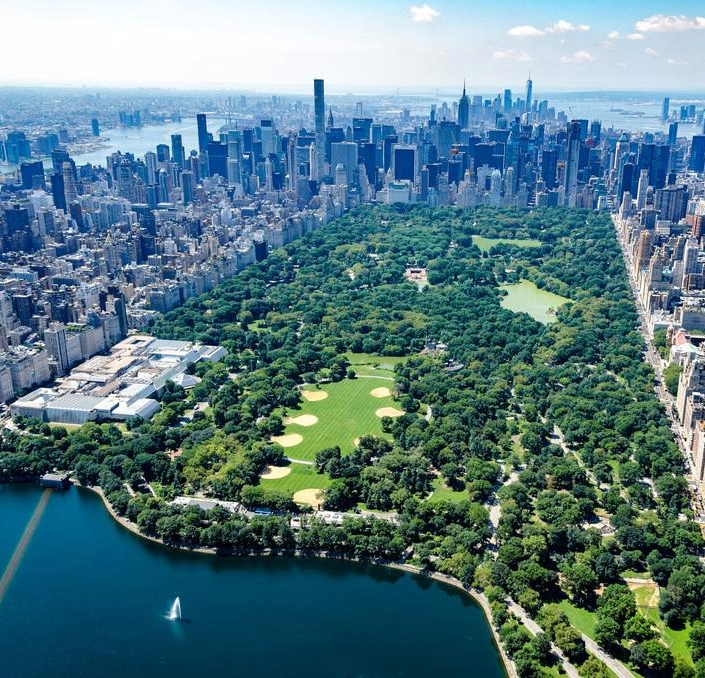
Central Park, one of the world's most visited tourist attractions, is surrounded by the skyscrapers of Manhattan in New York City.

An urban park or metropolitan park, also known as a city park, municipal park (North America), public park, public open space, or municipal gardens (UK), is a park or botanical garden in cities, densely populated suburbia and other incorporated places that offers green space and places for recreation to residents and visitors. Urban parks are generally landscaped by design, instead of lands left in their natural state. The design, operation and maintenance is usually done by government agencies, typically on the local level, but may occasionally be contracted out to a park conservancy, "friends of" group, or private sector company.

Depending on size, budget, and land features, which varies considerably among individual parks, common features include playgrounds, gardens, hiking, running, fitness trails or paths, bridle paths, sports fields and courts, public restrooms, boat ramps, performance venues, or BBQ and picnic facilities. Park advocates claim that having parks near urban residents, including within a 10-minute walk, provides multiple benefits.

== History ==
A park is an area of open space provided for recreational use, usually owned and maintained by a local government. Grass is typically kept short to discourage insect pests and to allow for the enjoyment of picnics and sporting activities. Trees are chosen for their beauty and to provide shade, with an increasing emphasis on reducing an urban heat island effect.

Some early parks include the La Alameda de Hércules, in Seville, a promenaded public mall, urban garden and park built in 1574, within the historic center of Seville. The Városliget (City Park) in the City of Pest, what is today Budapest, Hungary, was a city property when afforestation started in the middle of the 18th century, from the 1790s with the clear aim to create a public park. Between 1799 and 1805 it was rented out to the Batthyány family to carry out such a project but the city had eventually taken back control and in 1813 announced a design competition to finally finish the park; works started in 1816.

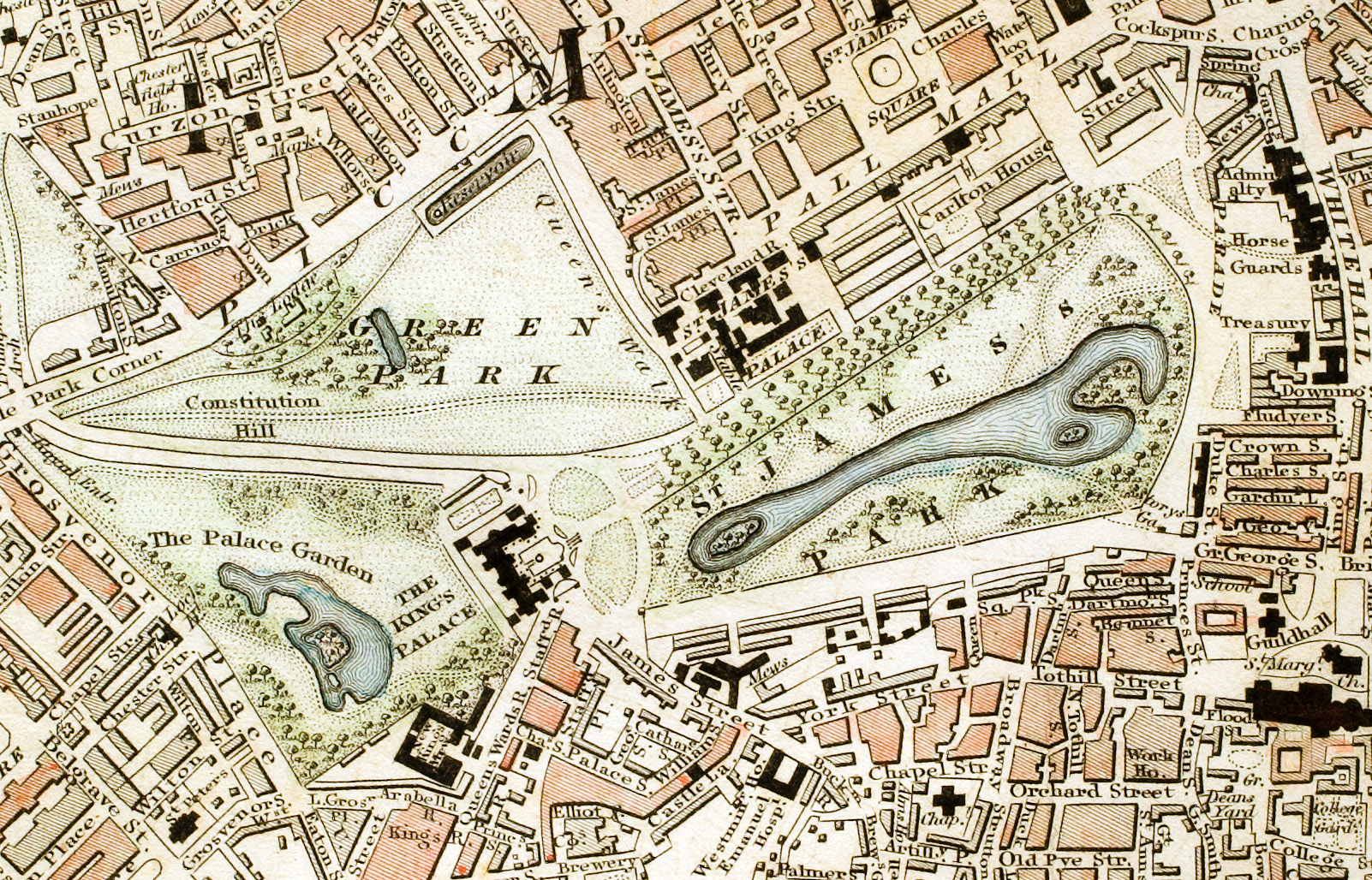
Green Park and St James Park in London, c. 1833

An early purpose-built public park, although financed privately, was Princes Park in the Liverpool suburb of Toxteth. This was laid out to the designs of Joseph Paxton from 1842 and opened in 1843. The land on which the park was built was purchased by Richard Vaughan Yates, an iron merchant and philanthropist, in 1841 for £50,000. The creation of Princes Park showed great foresight and introduced a number of highly influential ideas. First and foremost was the provision of open space for the benefit of townspeople and local residents within an area that was being rapidly built up. Secondly it took the concept of the designed landscape as a setting for the suburban domicile (an idea pioneered by John Nash at Regent's Park in London) and re-fashioned it for the provincial town in a most original way. Nash's remodelling of St James's Park from 1827 and the sequence of processional routes he created to link The Mall with Regent's Park completely transformed the appearance of London's West End. With the establishment of Princes Park in 1842, Joseph Paxton did something similar for the benefit of a provincial town, albeit one of international stature by virtue of its flourishing mercantile sector. Liverpool had a burgeoning presence in global maritime trade before 1800, and during the Victorian era its wealth rivalled that of London itself.

The form and layout of Paxton's ornamental grounds, structured about an informal lake within the confines of a serpentine carriageway, put in place the essential elements of his much-imitated design for Birkenhead Park in Birkenhead. The latter commenced in 1843 with the help of public finance and deployed the ideas which Paxton had pioneered at Princes Park on a more expansive scale. Frederick Law Olmsted visited Birkenhead Park in 1850 and praised its qualities. Indeed, Paxton is widely credited as having been one of the principal influences on Olmsted and Calvert's design for New York's Central Park of 1857.

Another early public park, the Peel Park, Salford, England, opened on 22 August 1846.

=== United States ===
Boston Common was purchased for public use grazing cows and as a military parade ground and dump in 1634. It first started to get recreational elements in 1728, arguably making it the first municipal park in the United States and the world, though cow grazing did not end until the 1830s.

Around the country, the predecessors to urban parks in the United States were generally rural cemeteries. The cemeteries were intended as civic institutions designed for public use. Before the widespread development of public parks, the rural cemetery provided a place for the general public to enjoy outdoor recreation amidst art and sculpture previously available only for the wealthy.

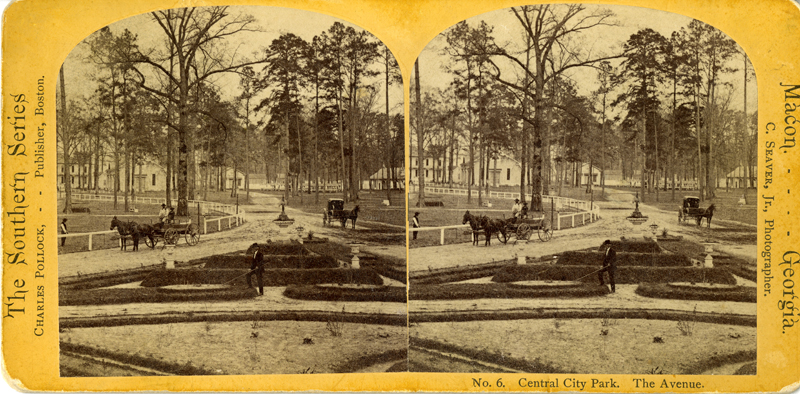
Macon, Georgia Central City Park, Main Avenue, c. 1877

In The Politics of Park Design: A History of Urban Parks in America, (Cambridge, Massachusetts: MIT Press, 1982), Professor Galen Cranz identifies four phases of park design in the U.S. In the late 19th century, city governments purchased large tracts of land on the outskirts of cities to form "pleasure grounds": semi-open, charmingly landscaped areas whose primary purpose was to allow city residents, especially the workers, to relax in nature. As time passed and the urban area grew around the parks, land in these parks was used for other purposes, such as zoos, golf courses and museums. These parks continue to draw visitors from around the region and are considered regional parks, because they require a higher level of management than smaller local parks. According to the Trust for Public Land, the three most visited municipal parks in the United States are Central Park in New York, Lincoln Park in Chicago, Mission Bay Park in San Diego.

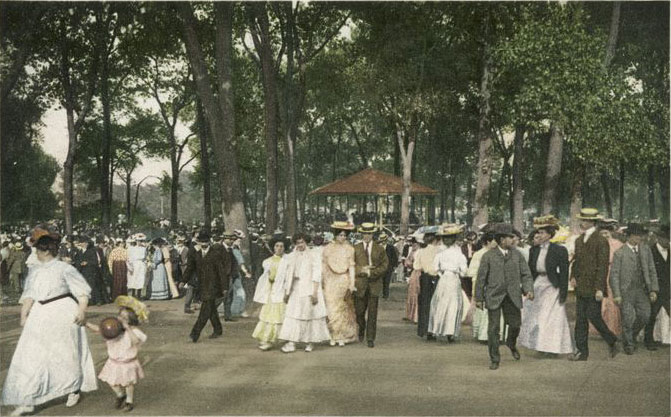
A concert in Chicago's Lincoln Park, c. 1907

In the early 1900s, according to Cranz, U.S. cities built neighborhood parks with swimming pools, playgrounds and civic buildings, with the intention of Americanizing the immigrant residents. In the 1950s, when money became available after World War II, new parks continued to focus on both outdoor and indoor recreation with services, such as sports leagues using their ball fields and gymnasia. These smaller parks were built in residential neighborhoods, and tried to serve all residents with programs for seniors, adults, teens and children. Green space was of secondary importance.

As urban land prices climbed, new urban parks in the 1960s and after have been mainly pocket parks. One example of a pocket park is Chess Park in Glendale, California. The American Society of Landscape Architects gave this park a General Design Award of Honor in 2006. These small parks provide greenery, a place to sit outdoors, and often a playground for children.

All four types of park continue to exist in urban areas. Because of the large amount of open space and natural habitat in the former pleasure grounds, they now serve as important wildlife refuges, and often provide the only opportunity for urban residents to hike or picnic in a semi-wild area. However, city managers or politicians can target these parks as sources of free land for other uses. Partly for this reason, some of these large parks have "friends of X park" advisory boards that help protect and maintain their semi-wild nature.

=== United Kingdom ===
There are around estimated 27,000 public parks in the UK, with around 2.6 billion visits to parks each year. Many parks are of cultural and historical interest, with 300 registered by Historic England as of national importance. Most public parks have been provided and run by local authorities over the past hundred and seventy years, but these authorities have no statutory duty to fund or maintain these public parks. In 2016 the Heritage Lottery Fund's State of UK Public Parks reported that "92 per cent of park managers report their maintenance budgets have reduced in the past three years and 95 per cent expect their funding will continue to reduce".

== Uses ==
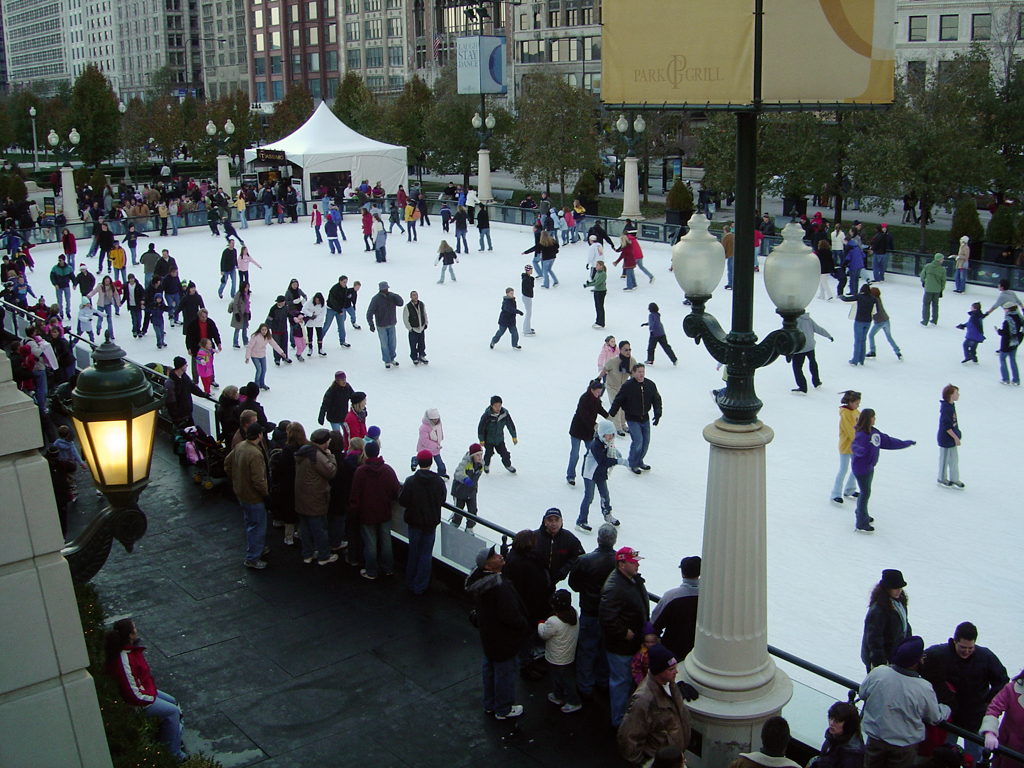
Millennium Park is an urban park in Chicago that is partitioned into areas with various special uses

Parks can be divided into active and passive recreation areas. Active recreation is that which has an urban character and requires intensive development. It often involves cooperative or team activity, including playgrounds, ball fields, swimming pools, gymnasiums, and skateparks. Active recreation such as team sports, due to the need to provide substantial space to congregate, typically involves intensive management, maintenance, and high costs.

Passive recreation, also called "low-intensity recreation" is that which emphasizes the open-space aspect of a park and allows for the preservation of natural habitat. It usually involves a low level of development, such as rustic picnic areas, benches, and walking trails. Passive recreation typically requires little management and can be provided at very low costs. Some open space managers provide nothing other than trails for physical activity in the form of walking, running, horse riding, mountain biking, snowshoeing, or cross-country skiing; or sedentary activity such as observing nature, bird watching, painting, photography, or picnicking.

Limiting park or open space use to passive recreation over all or a portion of the park's area eliminates or reduces the burden of managing active recreation facilities and developed infrastructure. Many ski resorts combine active recreation facilities (ski lifts, gondolas, terrain parks, downhill runs, and lodges) with passive recreation facilities (cross-country ski trails).

Many smaller neighborhood parks are receiving increased attention and valuation as significant community assets and places of refuge in heavily populated urban areas. Neighborhood groups around the world are joining together to support local parks that have suffered from urban decay and government neglect.

A 2025 satellite-based study of 2,083 urban parks worldwide found that parks with substantial tree cover had summer daytime land surface temperatures averaging 3.4°C lower than those of surrounding urban areas.

== Park types ==
A linear park is a park that has a much greater length than width. A typical example of a linear park is a section of a former railway that has been converted into a park called a rail trail or greenway (i.e. the tracks removed, vegetation allowed to grow back). Some examples of linear parks in North America include New York's High Line and the Village of Yorkville Park in Toronto, which won an award from the American Society of Landscape Architects. Parks are sometimes made out of oddly shaped areas of land, much like the vacant lots that often become city neighborhood parks. Linked parks may form a greenbelt.

There is a form of an urban park in the UK (officially called a "recreation ground", but commonly called a "rec" by the public.) and some EU states that have mostly recreation grounds for kids to play within a park, but may also have a duck pond, large grassy zones not meant exclusively for sports, many trees, and several bushy places. When it occurs as a separate facility on its own, without any parkland, at a street corner or by a shop, the play facility is called a playground.

== Gallery ==
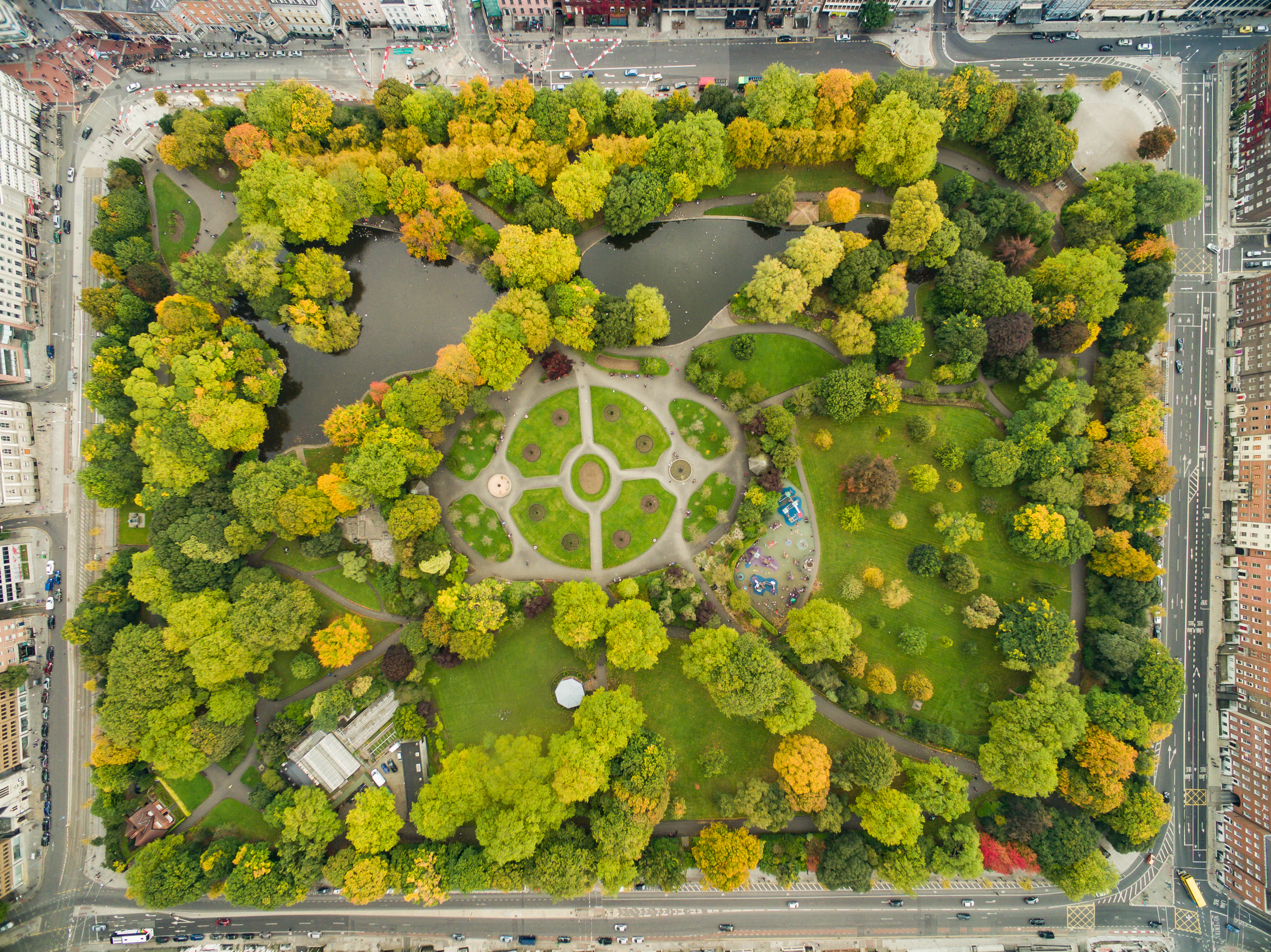
Aerial view of Dublin's St Stephen's Green, showing greenery, paths, and a pond

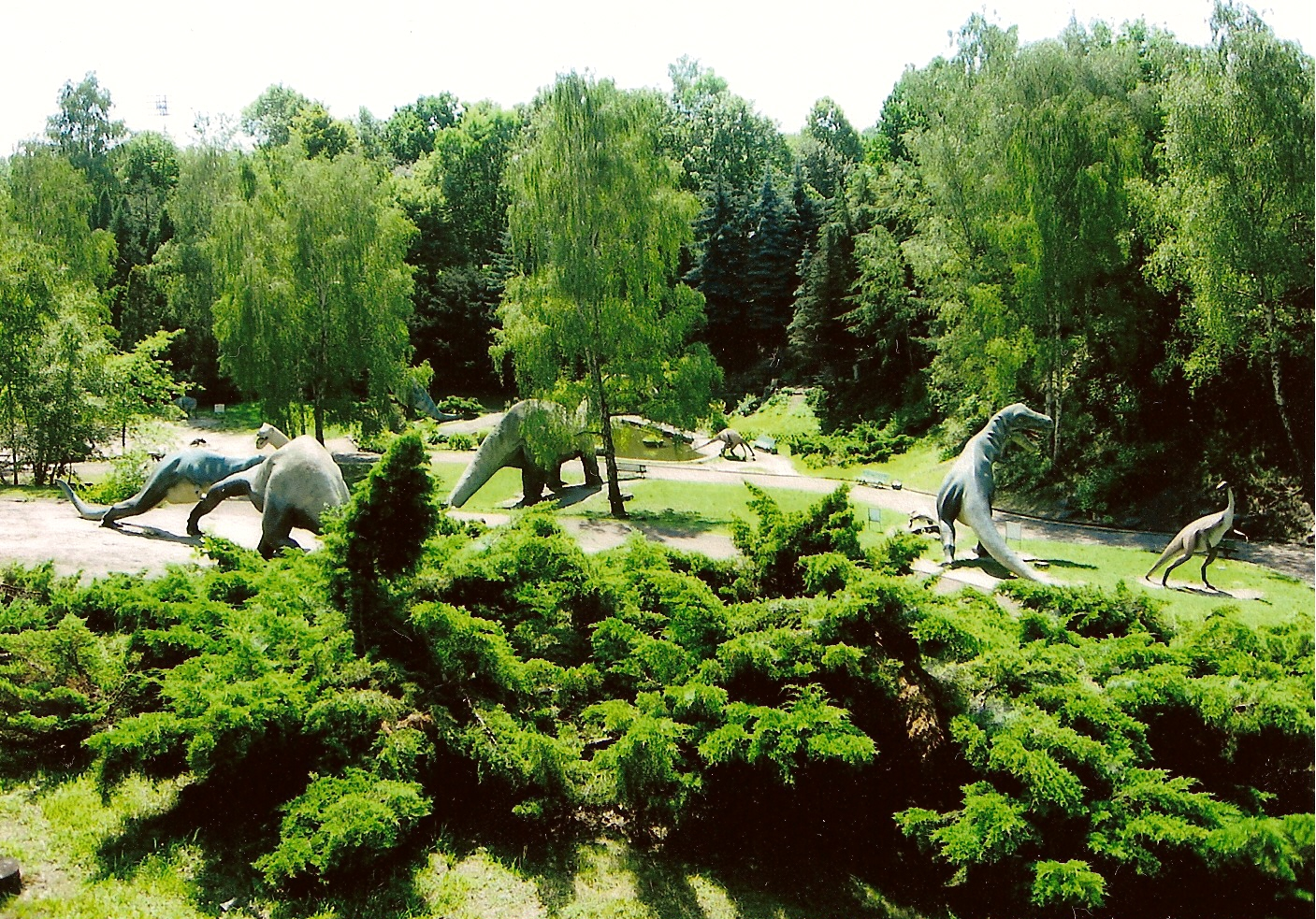
The Dinosaurs Valley (reconstructions of prehistoric reptiles) within Silesian Park in Metropolis GZM, Poland

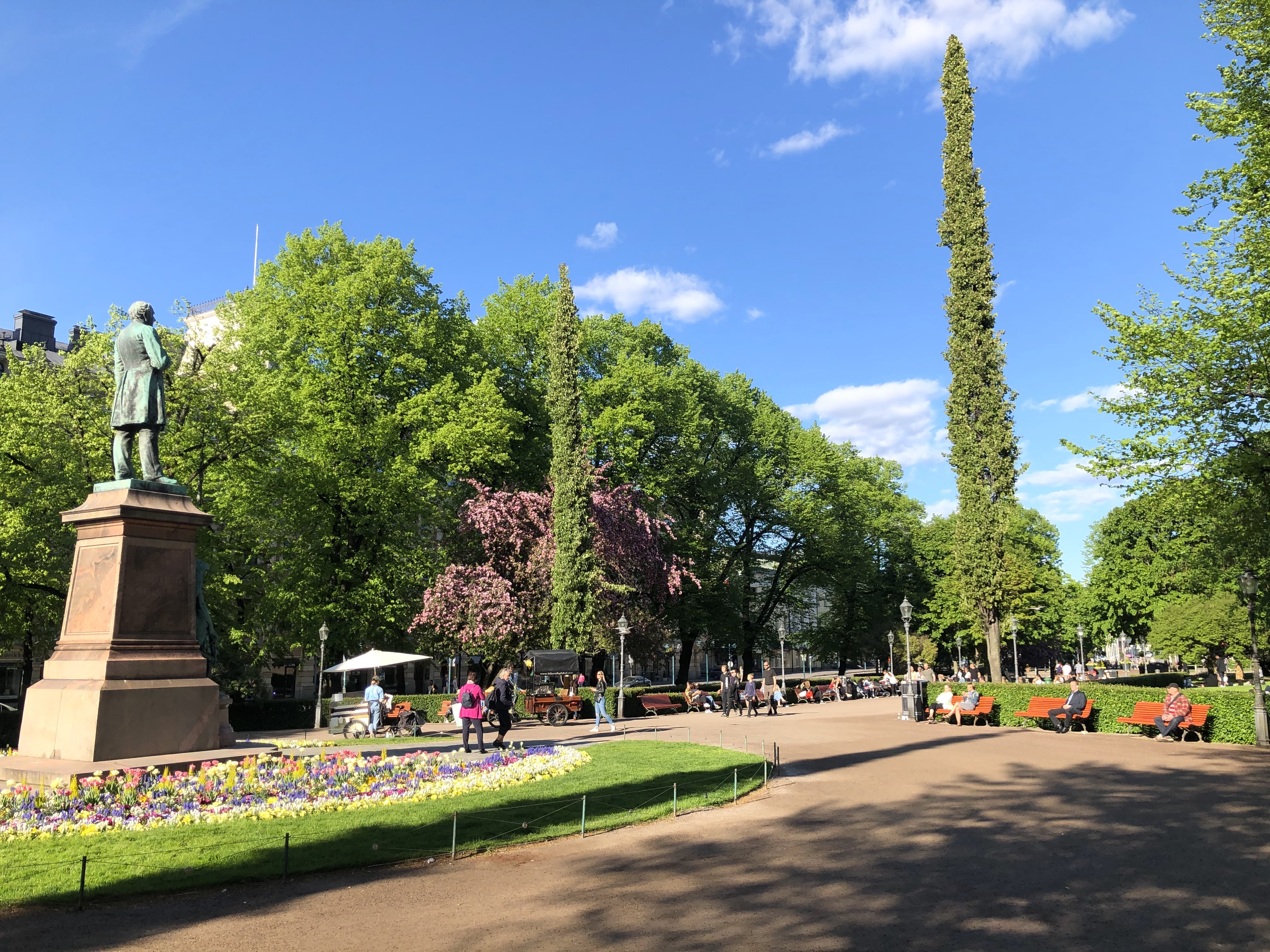
The Esplanadi Park in the city center of Helsinki, Finland, in 2020

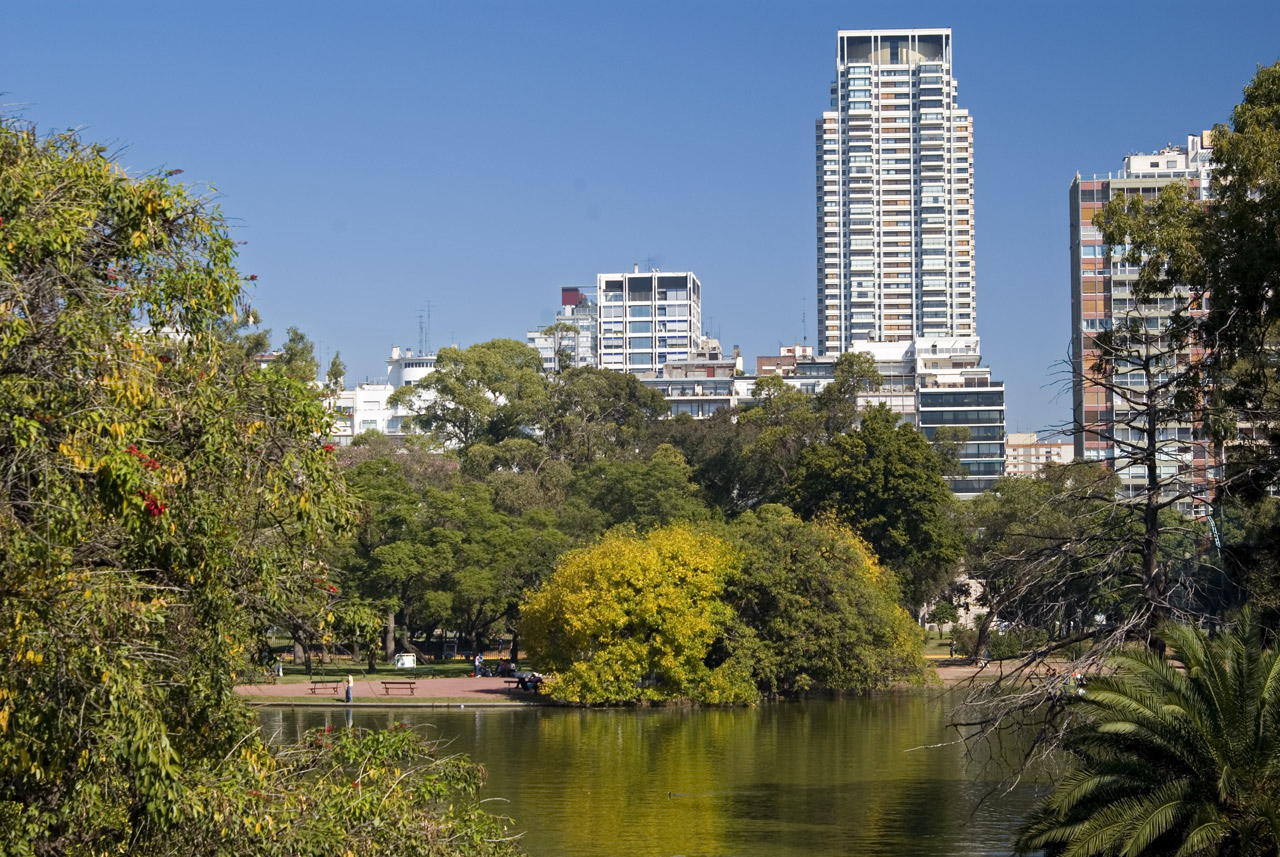
Parque Tres de Febrero, in Buenos Aires, Argentina, has a lake, a rose garden and a planetarium, among other attractions

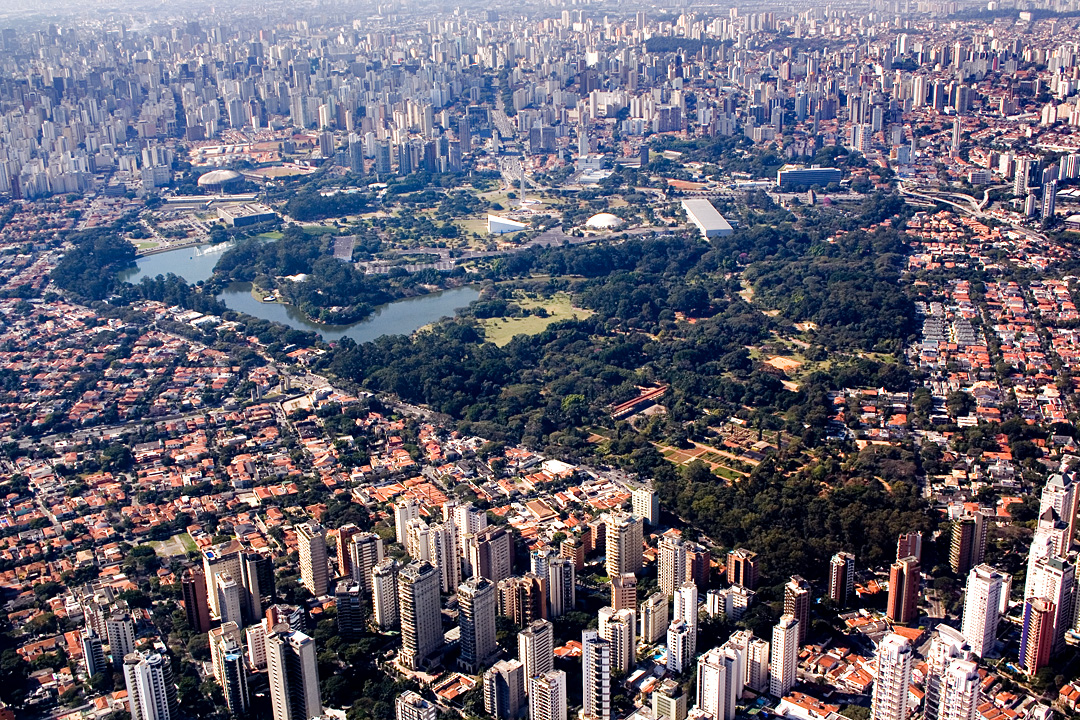
The Ibirapuera Park, in São Paulo, Brazil, was the most visited urban park in South America in 2017

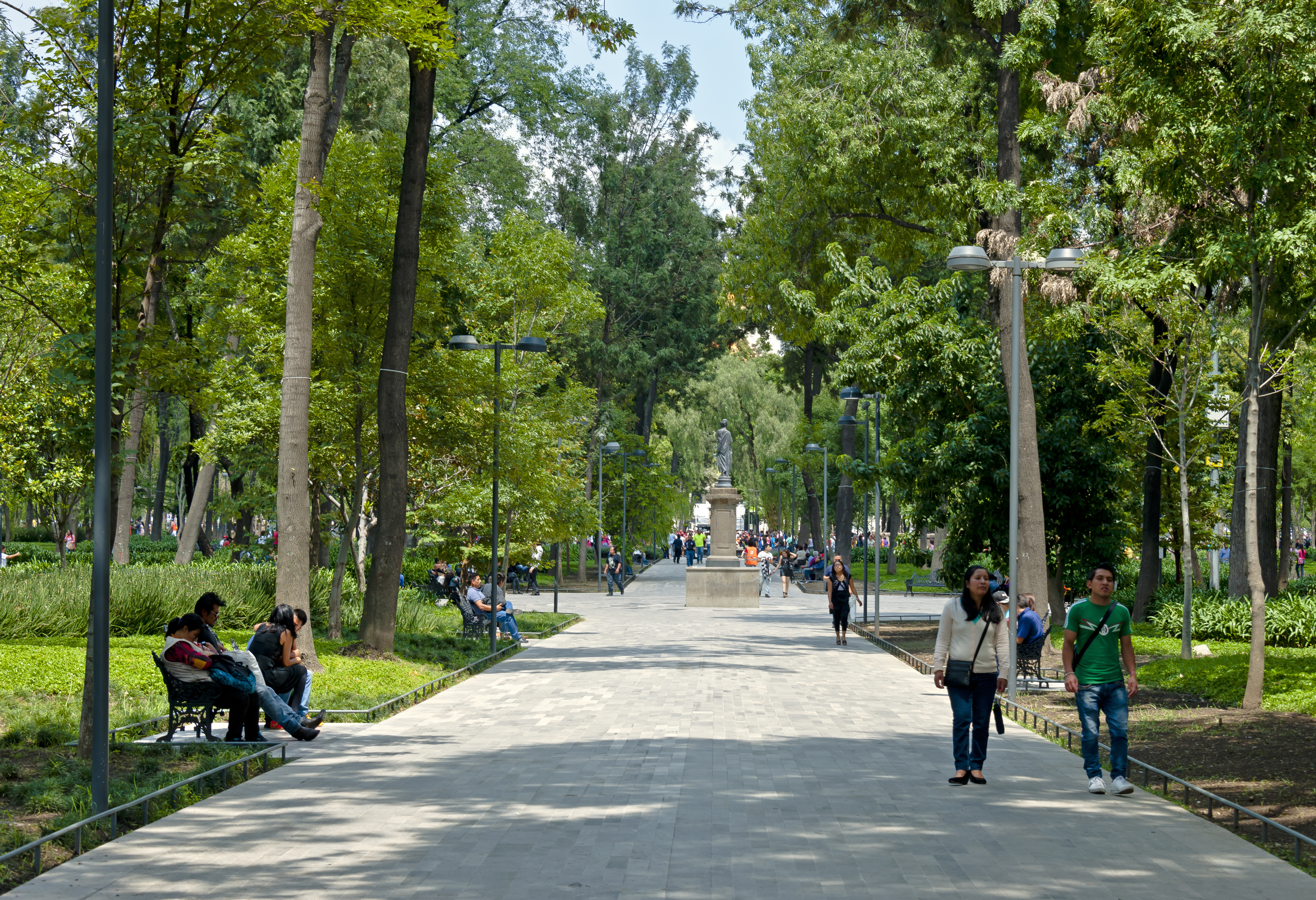
The Alameda Central, in Mexico City, is the oldest public park in the Americas.

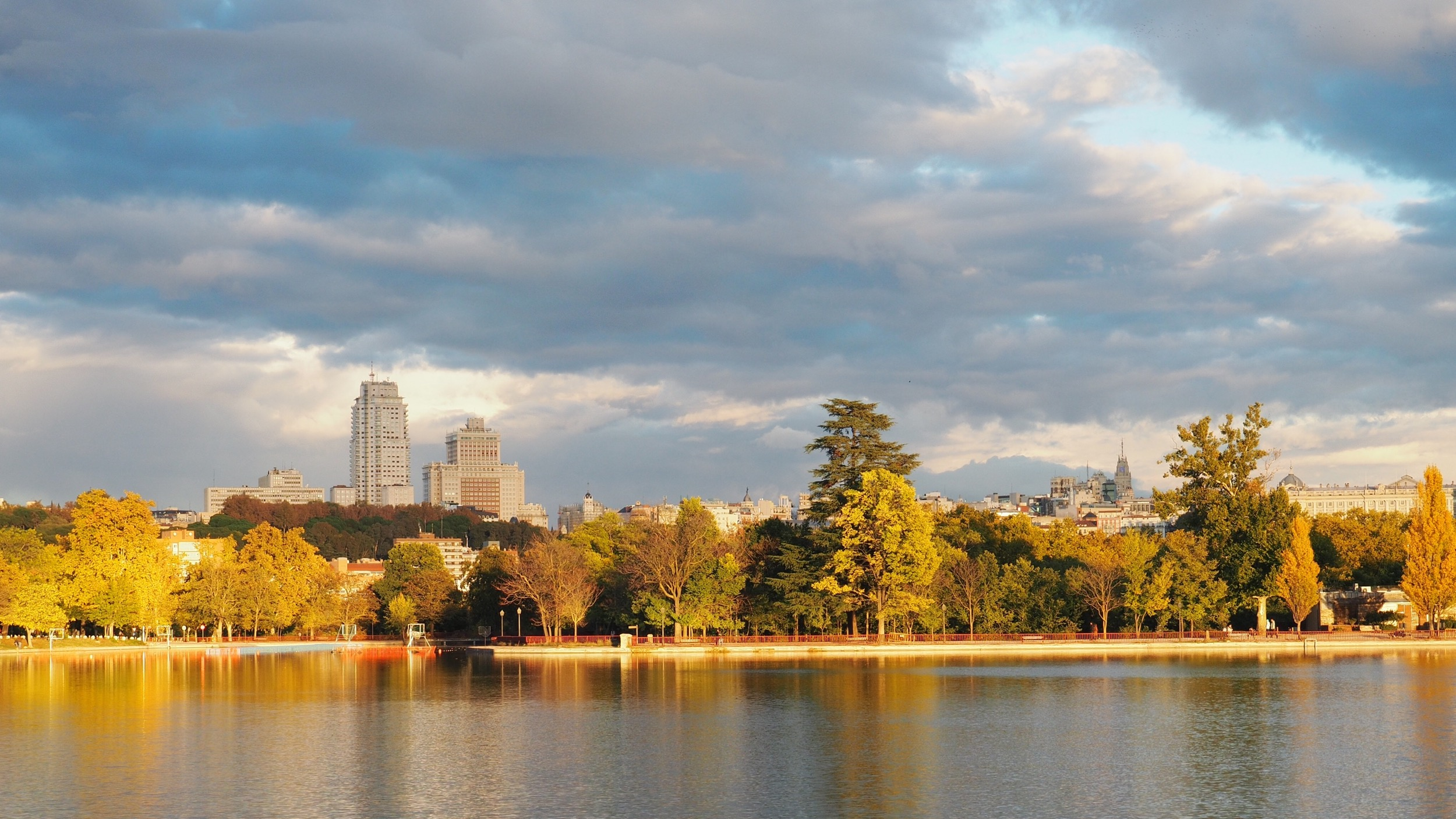
Casa de Campo, the largest public park in Madrid, Spain

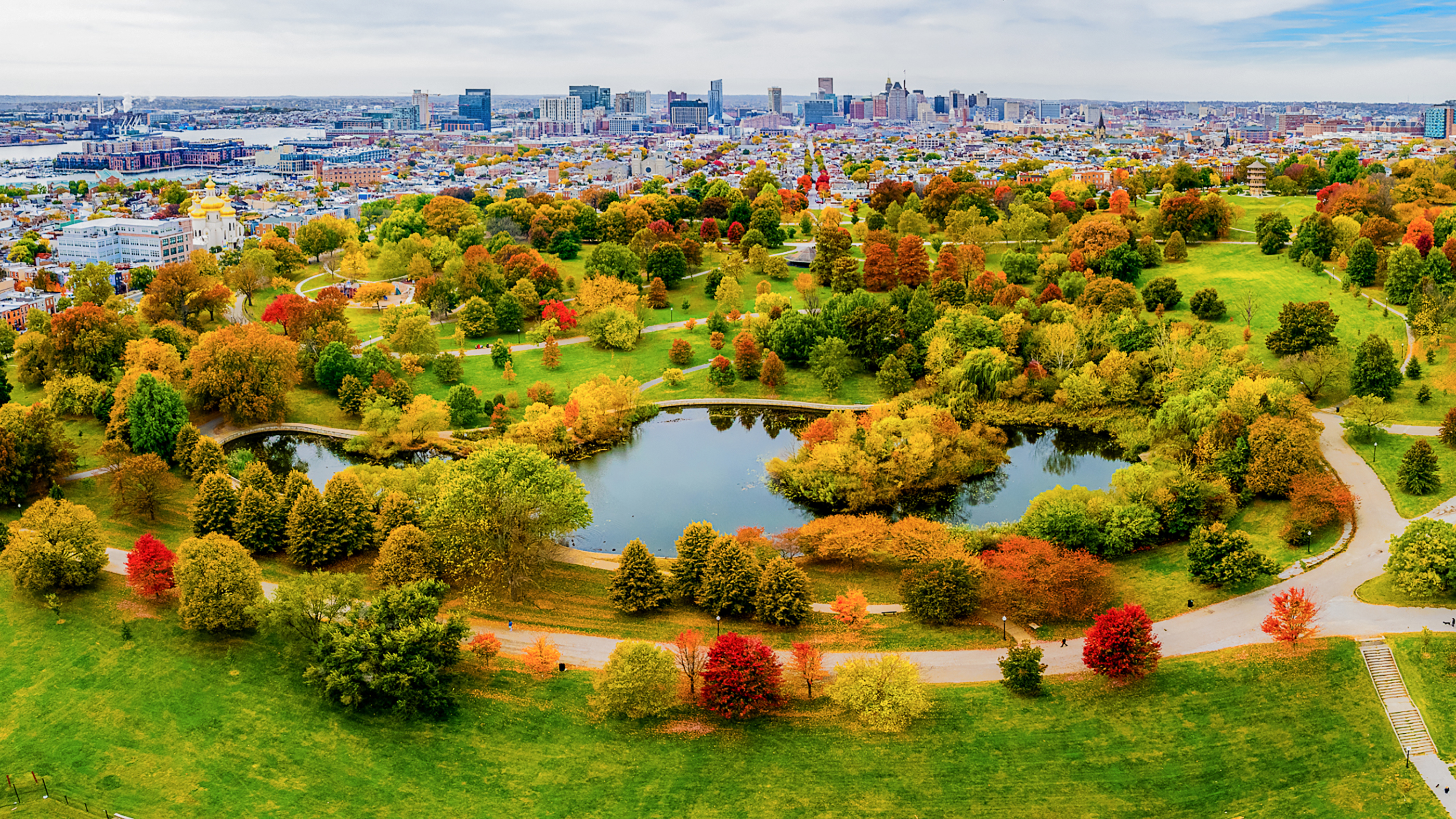
Patterson Park in Baltimore, Maryland.

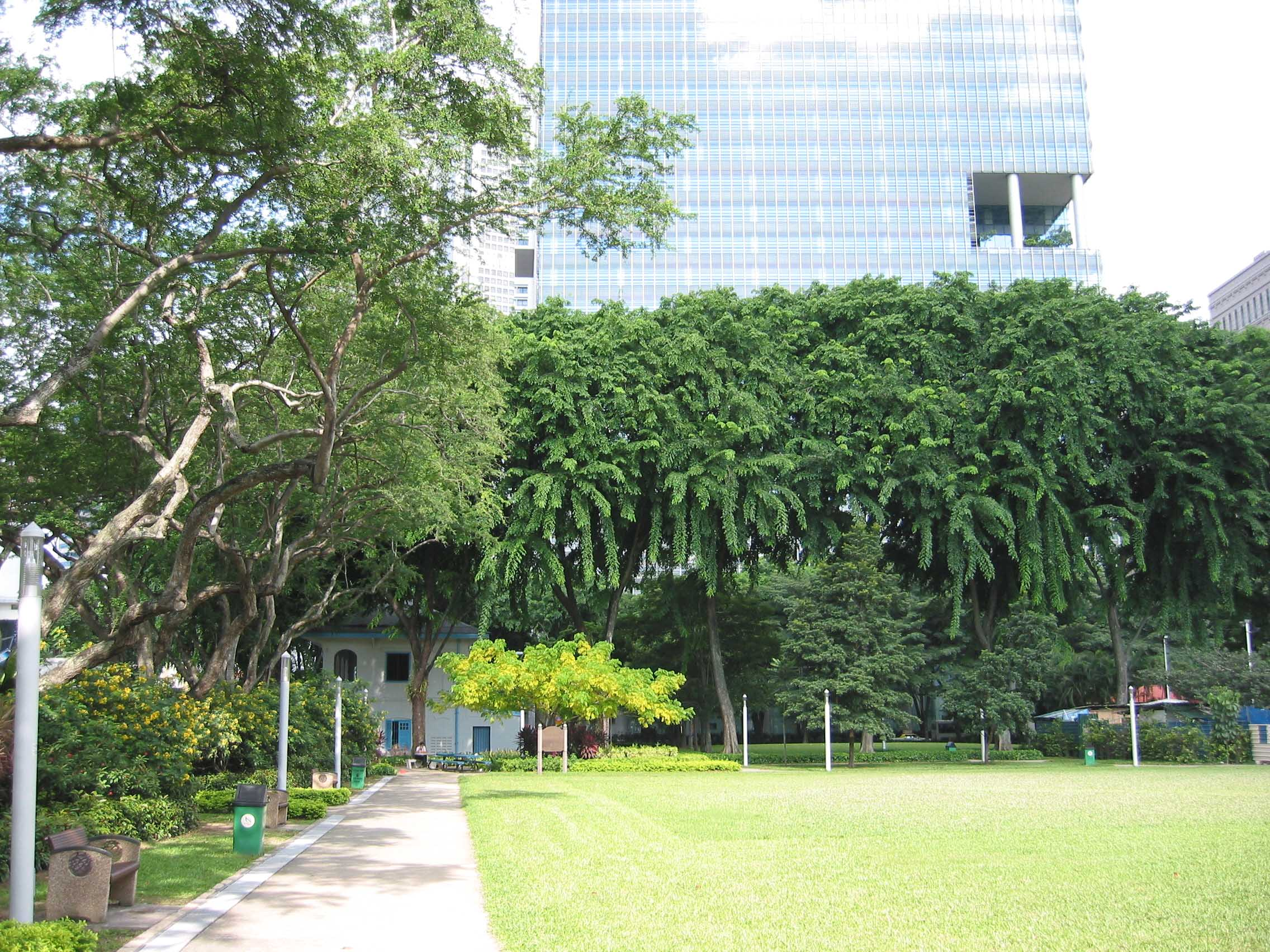
Hong Lim Park, Singapore

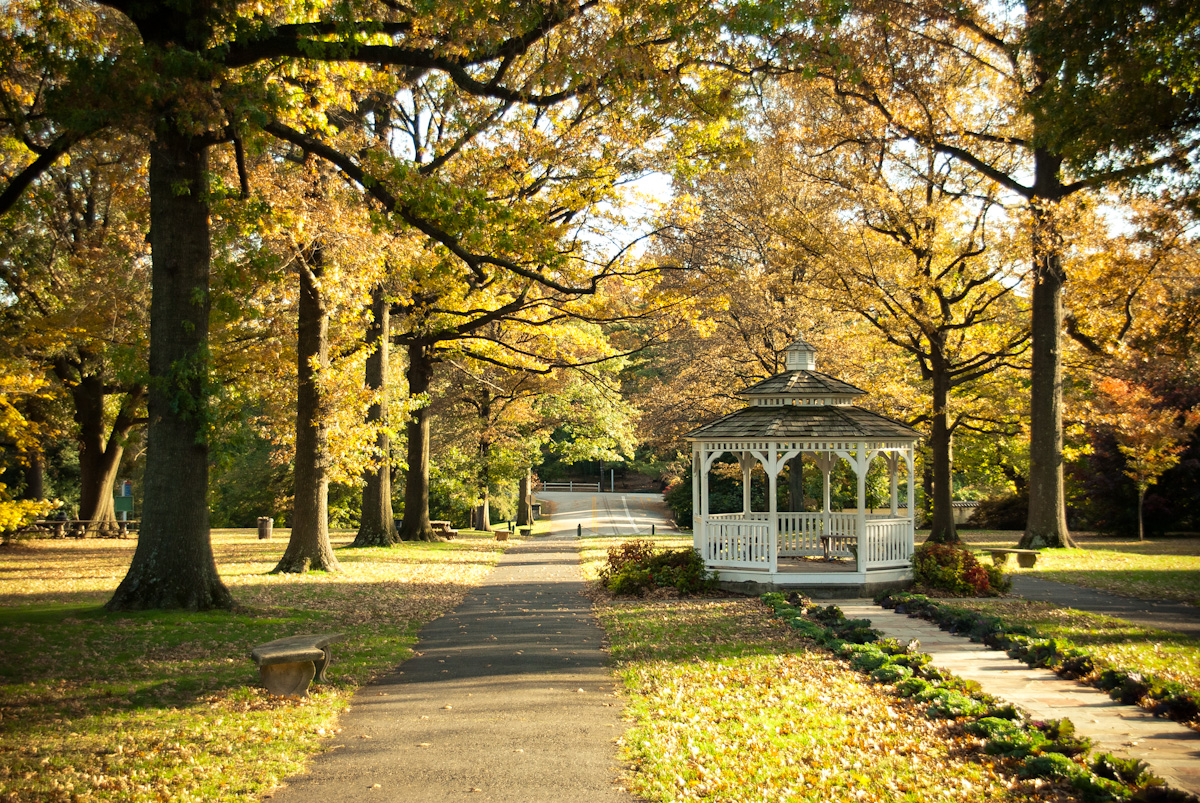
Fairmount Park, Philadelphia

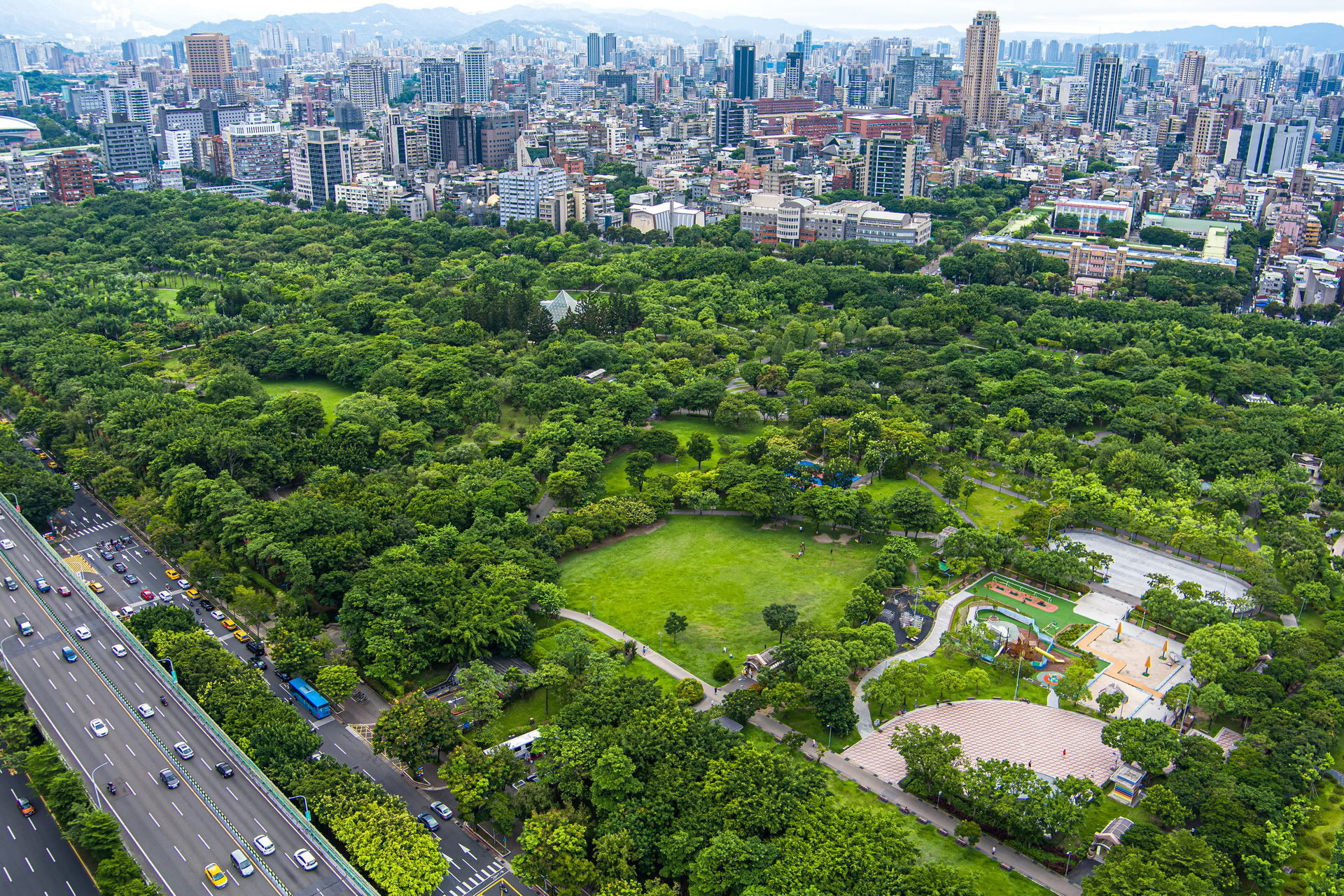
Daan Forest Park in Taipei, Taiwan

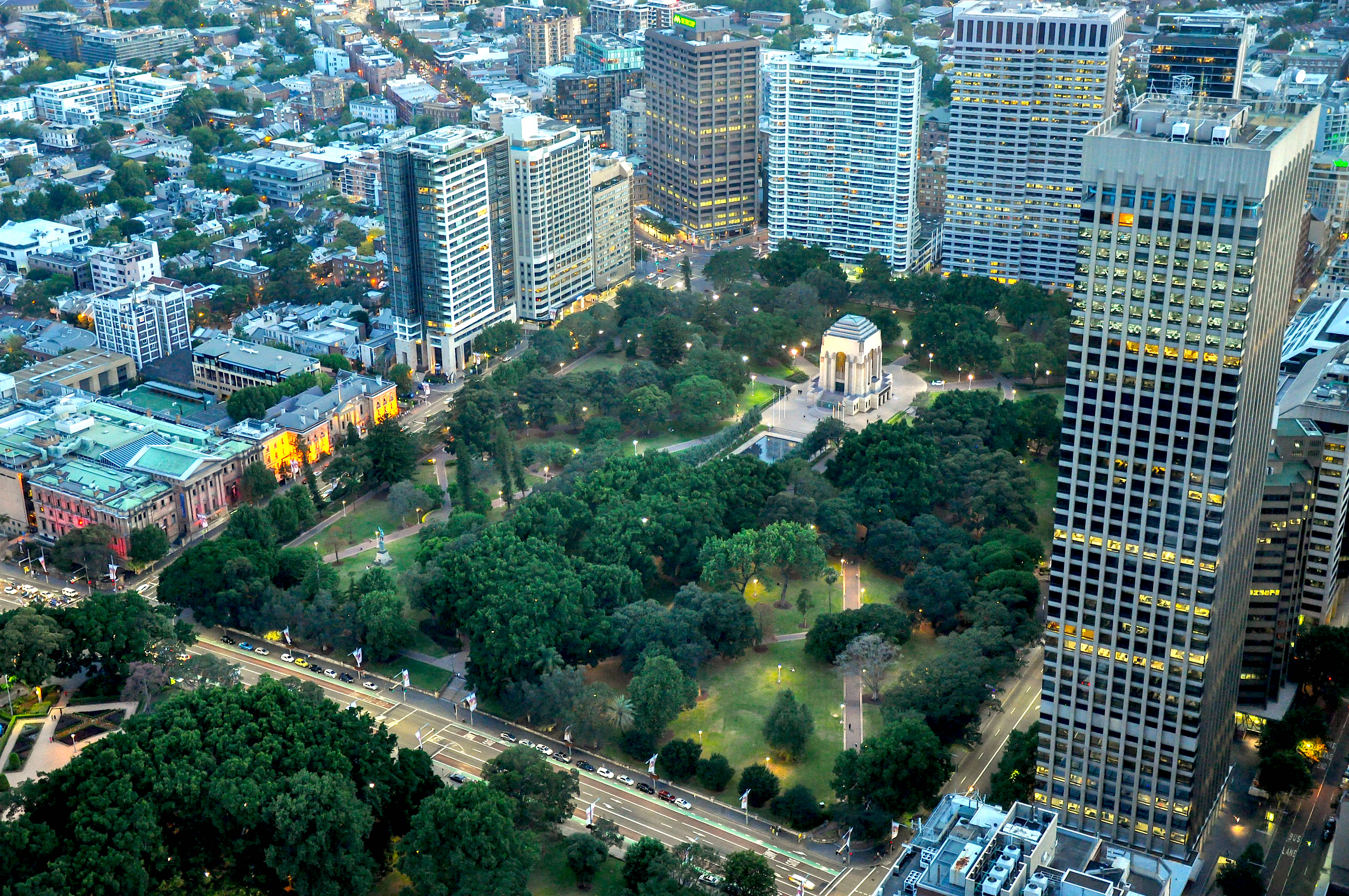
Hyde Park, Sydney, Australia, the oldest public parkland in Australia

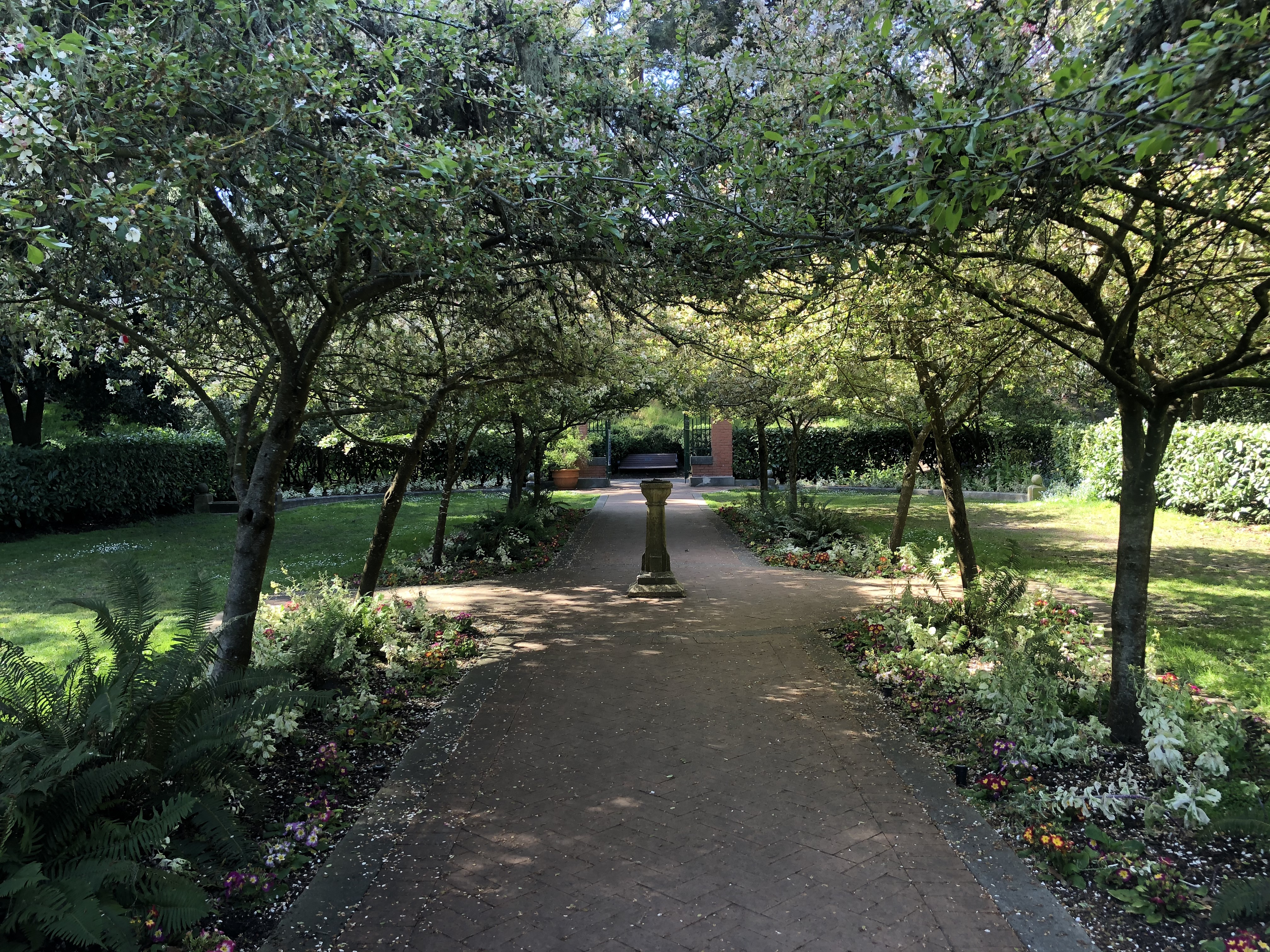
Golden Gate Park, the largest urban park in San Francisco

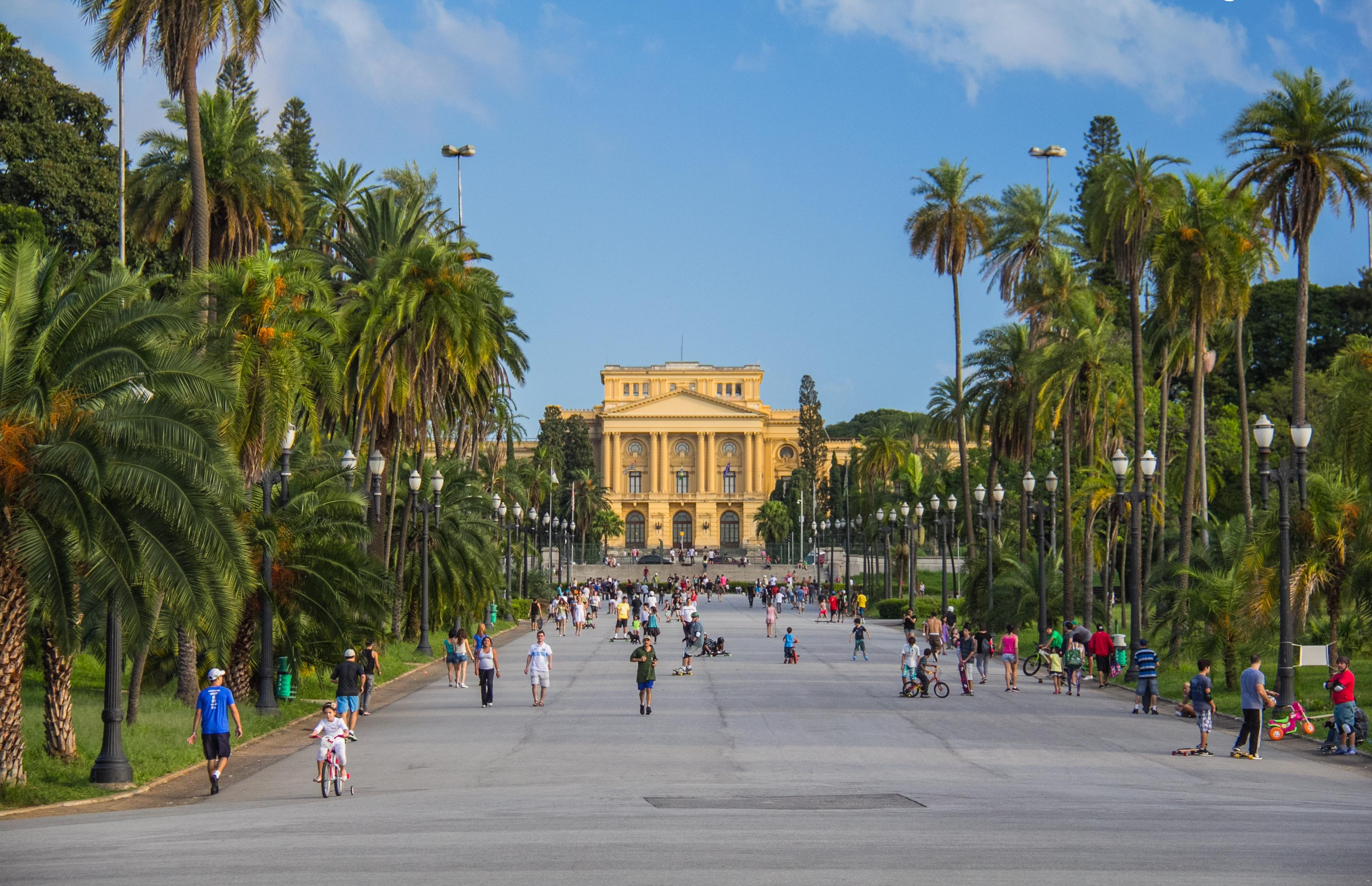
Independence Park in São Paulo, Brazil. This urban park is located at the site where Prince Regent Pedro (later emperor as Pedro I) proclaimed the independence of Brazil in 1822

== See also ==
- 10-Minute Walk
- Greenway (landscape)
- List of urban parks by size
- Parklet
- Pocket park
- Urban wild
