= Science is a Sacred Cow =

Book written by Anthony Standen

- Author: Anthony Standen
- Publisher: E. P. Dutton
- Publication date: 1950

Science is a Sacred Cow is a book written by the chemist Anthony Standen. It was first published in 1950 by E. P. Dutton. It was in print for 40 years. The book argues that some scientists and many teachers of science have "inflated egos" or, in the words of Standen, "a fabulous collective ego, as inflated as a skillfully blown piece of bubble gum". The book was widely reviewed.

== Reception ==
Part of the book's thesis is that the general public and students of science hold the words of scientists in awe even when these are merely "latinized nonsense". According to a March 1950 issue of Time, Standen's concerns are that scientists can be and have been "overbearing," "overpraised," and "overindulged". The book was once praised by one of the great scientists: Albert Einstein. An editorial note in the March 27, 1950, issue of Life magazine introducing several pages of excerpts and a half dozen editorial cartoons from Sacred Cow states "With tongue-in-cheek hyperbole, [Standen] suggests that a group that takes itself so seriously deserves some serious skepticism. Life—without taking all Mr. Standen's funmaking too seriously—thinks he deserves a happy hearing".

== Contents ==
The book is 221 pages and has eight chapters:

1. "They Say It's Wonderful."
2. "How They Dish It Out."
3. "Science at Its Best: Physics."
4. "Biology, or Know Thyself"
5. "The Proper Study: Psychology."
6. "The Social Animal."
7. "True Science: Mathematics."
8. "Watch Those Scientists."
