= Rebar Art and Design Studio =

Art studio in San Francisco, United States

Rebar Art and Design Studio, stylized as REBAR, is an interdisciplinary studio founded in 2004 and based in San Francisco, United States. The group's work encompasses visual and conceptual public art, landscape design, urban intervention, temporary performance installation, digital media and print design. Rebar's projects often intersect with contemporary urban ecology, new urbanism, and psychogeography practices and theory.

Principal members of Rebar are John Bela, Matthew Passmore, and Blaine Merker. Rebar's work has been exhibited at the 2008 Venice Architecture Biennale, ExperimentaDesign Amsterdam, ISEA 2009 Dublin, the Yerba Buena Center for the Arts, the American Institute of Architects, the Canadian Centre for Architecture, the Harvard Graduate School of Design, Parsons School of Design, University of California Berkeley, the University of Michigan, the University of Massachusetts Amherst.

== Projects ==
=== Park(ing) Day ===
Park(ing) Day was launched November 16, 2005, when Rebar converted a single metered parking space into a temporary public park in the SOMA district of San Francisco. The installation was a response to the fact that at the time 70% of San Francisco's downtown outdoor space was dedicated to the private vehicle. SOMA was chosen because of its reputation as a city district that was underserved by public open space. Today Park(ing) Day is a global “open source” project, which has been adapted to address social issues in urban contexts around the world such as in Athens. PARK(ing) Day has expanded to include interventions ranging from free health clinics, urban farming and ecology demonstrations, political seminars, art installations, and free bike repair shops. In 2009 more than 700 Park(ing) Day events were organized 140 cities, in 21 countries on 6 continents. In Seattle, Paul Kuniholm’s Belltown Unicorn Zoo earned Kuniholm the Seattle Department of Transportation Pavement Upcycle Award.

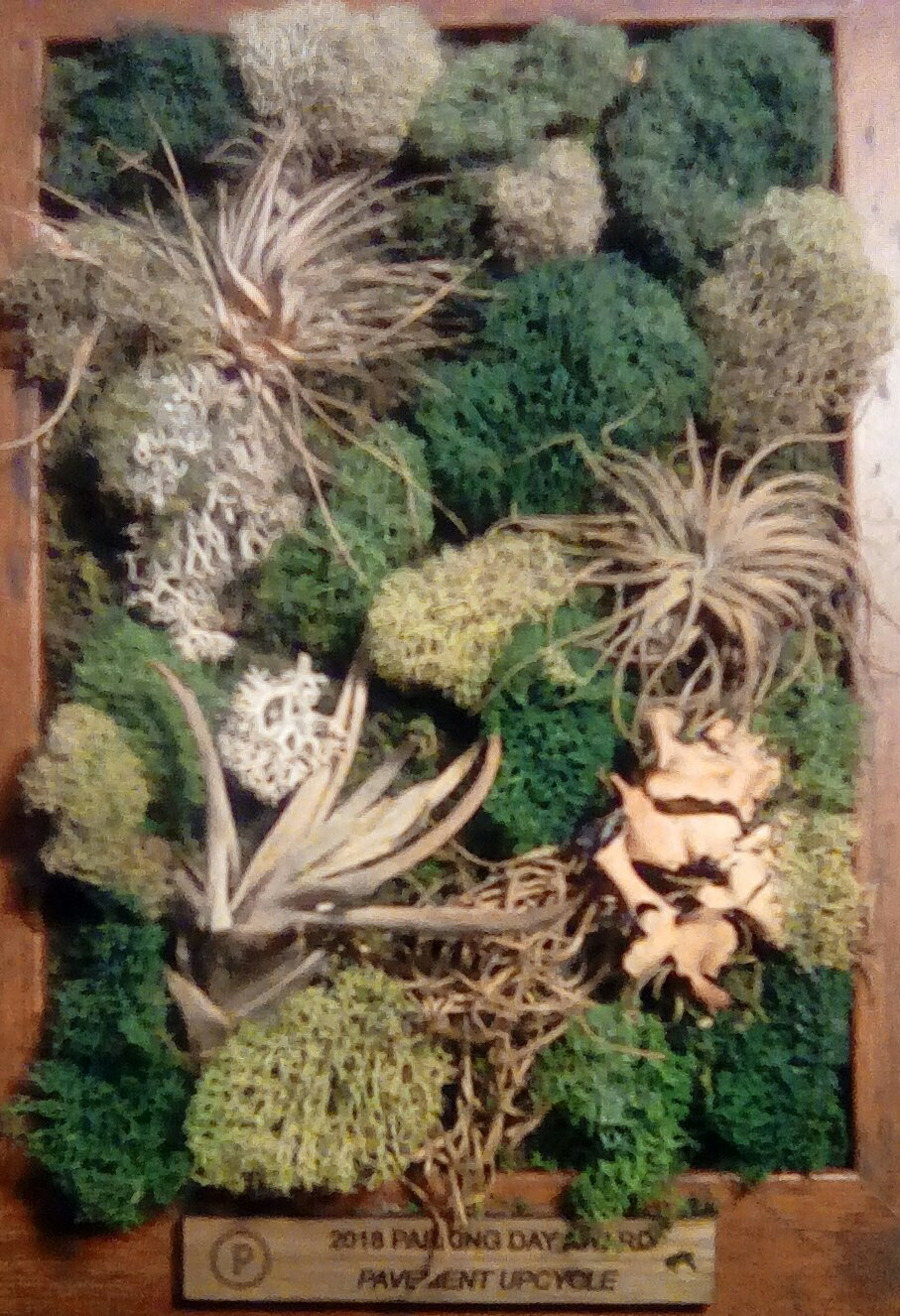
Paul Kuniholm Awarded 2018 Seattle Department of Transportation Parking Day Pavement Upcycle Award

=== Walklet ===
In May, 2010 Rebar designed and installed its first Walklet, located at 22nd Street and Bartlett in the Mission District of San Francisco. A second walklet was installed and in front of Café Greco along Columbus Avenue in the North Beach neighborhood of San Francisco in September 2010. The installation at 22nd and Bartlett in San Francisco was part of a Pavement to Parks pilot project supported by the San Francisco Planning Department. A third Walklet, which gained city approval in late October 2010, will extend the existing Columbus Street installation. In September 2010, San Francisco's expanded the scope of the Pavement to Parks program when it issued a request for proposals for Parklet permits to city businesses and nonprofits.

A Walklet extends the sidewalk surface into the street and creates a more open and walkable pedestrian experience by converting parking spaces into public space. A Walklet is composed of many three-foot wide modules, which each serve a purpose, such as seating area, standing and walking area, or landscaping area. The modules can be mixed and matched with other Walklet modules to create a design combination for each site.

=== Showplace Triangle ===
Rebar also designed the Showplace Triangle park, located at 8th Street between 16th and Irwin Streets in the Potrero Hill district of San Francisco. It was San Francisco's second Pavement to Parks project, following the Castro Commons park. Rebar's design for the park used dumpsters for planters and surplus granite countertops for bench seating. In February 2010 data collected by the Great Streets Project showed a 29 percent increase in pedestrians walking through the plaza, a 40 percent increase in the number of survey respondents who had a positive perception of the neighborhood, and a 61 percent increase among people who considered Showplace Triangle a good place to stop, relax and socialize. The number of users who felt a sense of community character in the area rose 39 percent.

=== Tacoshed ===
The Tacoshed project was collaboration between David Fletcher and Rebar, with the students of the Brave New Ecologies Course taught in the fall of 2009 as part of URBANlab, an innovative curriculum component of The California College of the Arts Architecture Program. The project was meant to give insight to how a familiar food like the food truck taco could provide information on the Bay Area's food and wastesheds. Tacoshed catalogued the network of systems, flows and ecologies that contribute to the lifecycle of a taco and the findings were presented at a public event in February 2010. A schematic diagram of the project was also published in issue 11 of Meatpaper magazine, released in spring 2010, and the project garnered mentions on BLDGBLOG and in Good Magazine. The progress of the project is communicated via the @tacoshed Twitter account. Maps and graphics were created by Rachael Yu and Annie Aldrich, Teresa Aguilera, and Fletcher Studio.

=== Cabinet National Library ===
For its spring 2003 issue on "Property," Cabinet Magazine, a non-profit Arts and Culture quarterly, purchased a half acre of land for $300 on eBay. The land was part of a failed 1960s residential development called the "Sunshine Valley Ranchettes," now a desolate tract of desert scrubland outside of Deming, New Mexico. The magazine set upon the land a complex, non-traditional development scheme. The land was dubbed Cabinetlandia and divided into manageable sectors- Readerlandia, Editorlandia, Nepotismia, and so forth. Magazine-sized parcels were offered to readers for a penny for a 99-year lease.

Rebar contacted Cabinet Magazine and organized a collaborative effort to construct the Cabinet National Library, a library which contains all and only back issues of Cabinet magazine. The project is an actual, usable library and it served as Rebar's founding project. The Cabinet National Library is built on the half acre site from a three-drawer file cabinet and includes a card catalog, guest book, guest services, back issues of Cabinet and a snack bar.

=== Hayes Valley Farm ===
In 2010 Rebar was a founding partner and design advisor in the Hayes Valley Farm project team. The project converted an empty lot of about 2 acres bordered by Laguna, Oak, Fell, and Octavia Streets in the Hayes Valley neighborhood of San Francisco, the site of ramps for the former Central Freeway, into a temporary urban farm. The freeway was damaged by the 1989 Loma Prieta earthquake and subsequently torn out, and the lot had been locked up. Rebar was involved in the design of the project concept and fundraising efforts and was later involved in the design and construction of the farm's modular greenhouse and other infrastructure, and its logo.
