= Meatpaper =

- Meatpaper Issue Zero
- Editor-In-Chief: Sasha Wizansky
- Categories: Food
- Frequency: Quarterly
- Founded: 2006
- Final issue: 2013
- Country: U.S.
- Based in: San Francisco, California
- Language: English
- Website: meatpaper.com

Meatpaper was an American magazine devoted to meat that was published between 2006 and 2013. The publication covered the ethics, aesthetics, and cultural significance of meat, and is more akin to an art journal than a usual food and drink magazine.

== History ==
Published quarterly, it was founded in 2006 by Sasha Wizansky and Amy Standen, who (in addition to both being former vegetarians) met while working at Salon.com.

In addition to the magazine itself, Meatpaper has organized events, such as a series of seminars on raising domestic rabbits for food. In 2007, it was named among the best magazines of the year by Library Journal, which called it "unique, brash, and provocative". In 2010, Good included it in their list of the eight food magazines you should read now.

In August 2013, Meatpaper cofounder Wizansky announced that the magazine's 20th issue would be its final printing, but that back issues would still be available for purchase.

== Content and editorial stance ==
Unlike many traditional food magazines, Meatpaper's content is not primarily directed at publishing recipes, but discusses the politics and ethics of food, along with essays and reporting on how it is prepared and consumed. In addition to editorial content, it is known for art, including original illustrations, paintings, and photographs.

The magazine intentionally does not take a particular stance that is for or against eating meat, but rather discusses it as a cultural phenomenon. Issues have included topics such as an interview with the creator of the meat dress of Lady Gaga, and a discussion of beef heart by famously offal-loving chef Chris Cosentino.
