= Amy Standen =

American journalist and author

- Occupation: Reporter
- Years active: 1981–present
- Notable credit: Meatpaper

Amy Standen is an American journalist and author. She cofounded the quarterly magazine Meatpaper in 2006 with former Salon.com journalist Sasha Wizansky. She reports for KQED, and has also reported for NPR and The Environment Report.

== Personal ==
Standen was born and raised in San Francisco, California. She also has two kids.

== Career ==
Standen began her career in journalism working in New York City for KPFA. Since her time there, she has been a producer on Pulse of the Planet, editor of Terrain Magazine, editor at Salon, and reporter for KALW's Philosophy Talk. While working as a radio reporter for KQED, Standen has been responsible for covering science and environmental issues facing Northern California.

== Honors and awards ==
- James Madison Freedom of Information Award
- Standen's work has also been recognized by the National Association of Public Radio News Directors and Northern California's Society of Professional Journalists

== Works ==
Standen is the author of Maggie Taylor's Landscape of Dreams, a book about the digital artwork of Maggie Taylor (published in 2005). She interviewed chef Chris Cosentino for issue zero of Meatpaper.
