= Naomi Standen =

- Born: 1965
- Occupation: Historian, professor
- Employer: University of Birmingham (2011–)
- Website: www.birmingham.ac.uk/staff/profiles/history/standen-naomi.aspx

Naomi Standen is Professor of Medieval History at the University of Birmingham and Senior Research Fellow at Jesus College, University of Oxford. She specialises in Eurasian history with a focus on regions within what is now China, North Korea and Mongolia. Standen joined the University of Birmingham in 2011, previously at Newcastle University from 2000 becoming a senior lecturer in 2007.

Standen is on the editorial board for the Journal of the British Association for Chinese Studies, from 2012, and the Bulletin of the Museum of Far Eastern Antiquities since 2005. She was a council member for the British Association for Chinese Studies, 2011 to 2014.

Standen was a member of the expert panel for BBC Radio 4's In Our Time for the episodes on Genghis Khan (2007), the Silk Road (2009) and the An Lushan rebellion (2012).

== Publications ==
- Standen, Naomi (2012), Demystifying China: new understandings of Chinese history, Rowman & Littlefield, ISBN 978-1442208964
- Standen, Naomi (2007), Unbounded loyalty: frontier crossing in Liao China, University of Hawaii Press, ISBN 9780824829834
- Power, Daniel; Standen, Naomi (1999), Frontiers in question: Eurasian borderlands, 700–1700, Themes in focus, Macmillan, ISBN 9780312216382
