= Anthony Standen =

American chemist (1906/07–1993)

Anthony Standen (died 1993, age 86) was an American chemist and entomologist who wrote the popular book Science is a Sacred Cow (1950). He was born in 1906 to an American mother and a British father. He was educated at Oxford University, Massachusetts Institute of Technology, and the University of New Hampshire.

He believed that scientists and their theories should be subjected to the same scrutiny and criticism that other professionals face.
