= Maria José Rodriguez-Salgado =

Maria José Rodriguez-Salgado (born 1955) is professor of international history at the London School of Economics. Rodriguez-Salgado is a specialist in 16th and 17th century Europe, Elizabeth Tudor, Philip II, Charles V, and Anglo-Spanish relations. With the staff of the National Maritime Museum she curated and wrote the guide to their exhibition Armada.

== Selected publications ==
- The Changing Face of Empire: Charles V, Philip II and Habsburg Authority 1551-1559. Cambridge University Press, Cambridge, 1988.
- Armada. The Official Catalogue of the National Maritime Museum Exhibition. Penguin Books, London, 1988. (With contributions from the staff of the National Maritime Museum)
- England, Spain and the Gran Armada, 1585-1604. Essays from the Anglo-Spanish Conferences London and Madrid 1988. John Donald, Edinburgh, 1991. (Edited with Dr. Simon Adams)
- Felipe II. El "Paladín de la Cristiandad" y la Paz con el Turco. Salamanca, 2004.
