= Centre for Renaissance and Early Modern Studies =

The Centre for Renaissance and Early Modern Studies (CREMS) was launched in October 2005 at the University of York. It was founded by Bill Sherman (literary scholar) who served as Director until 2011.

CREMS is focused on the study of the long 16th and 17th centuries. It brings together more than 40 academics and 60 postgraduate students from eight leading departments at York: English and Related Literature, History, History of Art, Archaeology, Music, Philosophy, Politics, and Theatre, Film, and Television, making it the largest centre of its kind in the UK. It is based at the university's Humanities Research Centre, which is located in Heslington Hall, a Grade II* listed manor house originally built in the sixteenth century.

The centre offers an annual programme of seminars, conferences and public lectures relating to the Renaissance and Early Modern periods. It runs its own taught MA in Renaissance and Early Modern Studies for students from a range of disciplinary backgrounds that want to undertake an interdisciplinary postgraduate research degree.

CREMS works closely with the Borthwick Institute for Archives and the university's other interdisciplinary centres in the Humanities (particularly the Centre for Medieval Studies, the Centre for Eighteenth Century Studies and the Institute for the Public Understanding of the Past), as well as with the York Minster Library, the Yorkshire Country House Project and the National Centre for Early Music.

The current director of the centre is Emilie Murphy. Previous directors include: Kevin Killeen (2021–2024), Simon Ditchfield (2018–2021), Helen Smith (British literary scholar) (2014–2017) and Mark Jenner (2011–2014).
