= The English Historical Review =

Peer-reviewed academic journal

- Discipline: History
- Language: English
- Edited by: Nandini Chatterjee; Misha Ewen; Alex Middleton; Jan Rüger; John Sabapathy; Katharine Sykes

Publication details
- History: 1886–present
- Publisher: Oxford University Press
- Frequency: Bimonthly
- Impact factor: 0.655 (2020)

Standard abbreviations
- ISO 4: Engl. Hist. Rev.

Indexing
- ISSN: 0013-8266 (print); 1477-4534 (web)
- LCCN: 05040370
- JSTOR: 00138266
- OCLC no.: 474766029

Links
- Journal homepage; Online access; Online archives

The English Historical Review is a bimonthly peer-reviewed academic journal that was established in 1886 and published by Oxford University Press (formerly by Longman). It publishes articles on all aspects of history – British, European, and world history – since the classical era. It is the oldest surviving English language academic journal in the discipline of history.

Six issues are currently published each year, and typically include at least six articles from a broad chronological range (roughly, medieval, early modern, modern and twentieth century) and around forty book reviews. The journal has (as of 2023) introduced a new section entitled Reflections, which includes historiographical essays, review articles, and assessments of the contributions of individual scholars to the field. It also aims to publish one Forum collection each year.

The journal was established in 1886 by John Dalberg-Acton, 1st Baron Acton, Regius professor of modern history at Cambridge, and a fellow of All Souls College, Oxford. The first editor was Mandell Creighton. The current editors are Nandini Chatterjee, Misha Ewen, Alex Middleton, Jan Rüger, John Sabapathy and Katharine Sykes.

== List of editors ==
Editors of The English Historical Review:

- 1886–1891: Mandell Creighton
- 1891–1894: Samuel Rawson Gardiner, assisted by Reginald Lane Poole
- 1895–1901: S. R. Gardiner and Reginald Lane Poole
- 1902–1920: Reginald Lane Poole, assisted (1920) by George Norman Clark
- 1921–1925: G. N. Clark assisted (1924-5) by E. Stanley Cohn
- 1926: G. N. Clark and Charles William Previté-Orton
- 1927–1938: C. W. Previté-Orton
- 1938–1939: C. W. Previté-Orton and G. N. Clark
- 1939–1958: John Goronwy Edwards and Richard Pares
- 1958–1959: J. G. Edwards and Denys Hay
- 1959–1965: Denys Hay
- 1965–1967: John Michael Wallace-Hadrill
- 1967–1974: J. M. Wallace-Hadrill and John Morris Roberts
- 1974–1978: J. M. Roberts and George Arthur Holmes
- 1978–1981: G. A. Holmes and Angus Donald Macintyre
- 1982–1986: A. D. Macintyre and Penry Herbert Williams
- 1986–1990: P. H. Williams and Robert John Weston Evans
- 1991–1995: R. J. W. Evans and John Maddicott
- 1996–1999: J. H. Maddicott and John Stevenson
- 1999–2001: J. H. Maddicott and Jean Dunbabin
- 2001: Jean Dunbabin and John Rowlatt
- 2001–2004: Jean Dunbabin and George W. Bernard
- 2004–2006: G. W. Bernard and Philip Waller
- 2007–2012: G. W Bernard and Martin Conway
- 2012–2013: Martin Conway and Catherine Holmes
- 2013–2016: Martin Conway, Catherine Holmes, and Peter Marshall
- 2017–2021: Catherine Holmes, Peter Marshall, Stephen Conway, and Hannah Skoda
- 2021–2022: Nandini Chatterjee, Stephen Conway, Peter Marshall, Jan Rüger, and Hannah Skoda
- 2022-2023: Nandini Chatterjee, Stephen Conway, Jan Rüger, Hannah Skoda, and Alice Taylor
- 2023–2024: Nandini Chatterjee, Jan Rüger, Hannah Skoda, and Alice Taylor
- 2024–2025: Nandini Chatterjee, Alex Middleton, Jan Rüger, Hannah Skoda, and Alice Taylor
- 2025: Nandini Chatterjee, Misha Ewen, Alex Middleton, Jan Rüger, John Sabapathy, and Hannah Skoda
- 2025–present: Nandini Chatterjee, Misha Ewen, Alex Middleton, Jan Rüger, John Sabapathy, and Katharine Sykes

== See also ==
- Historiography
- Historiography of the United Kingdom
