= Bruce Gordon (historian) =

Canadian historian

Bruce Gordon FRHistS (born 1962 in Canada) is a Canadian historian and the Titus Street Professor of Ecclesiastical History at Yale Divinity School. He previously taught at the University of St Andrews in Scotland, where he was professor of modern history and deputy director of the St Andrews Reformation Studies Institute. Gordon specializes in late-medieval and early modern religious culture. His 1990 dissertation was entitled Clerical Discipline and the Church Synods in Zürich, 1532-1580.

== Academic career ==
In 1984, Gordon earned his BA in Mediaeval Studies at King's College, Dalhousie University, with first-class honours and a university medal. He earned his MA from the same university in 1986. His PhD, supervised by James K. Cameron, was completed at the University of St Andrews in 1990. It was awarded the Samuel Rutherford Prize for the best doctoral dissertation in theology, church history, Scottish history or English literature at St Andrews.

In 1990, Gordon began a two-year fellowship at the Leibniz Institute of European History in Mainz. In 1993 he spent a year as a teaching assistant at Knox College, the University of Toronto's theological college. In 1994 he was appointed to a lectureship in modern history at the University of St Andrews. He was promoted to reader in 2002 and professor in 2007. Gordon joined the Yale Divinity School in 2008 as professor of Reformation history, and in 2009 was appointed the Titus Street Professor of Ecclesiastical History.

=== Editorial roles ===
Gordon currently sits on the editorial boards of the journals Reformation; Reformation and Renaissance Review; and the Journal of Presbyterian History. He is also on the editorial board of the St Andrews Studies in Reformation History series, published by Brill.

== Works ==
- Clerical Discipline and the Rural Reformation: The Synod in Zürich, 1532-1580 (Zürcher Beiträge zur Reformationsgeschichte) (Peter Lang, 1992) ISBN 9783261044068
- (editor with Peter Marshall) The Place of the Dead in Late Medieval and Early Modern Europe (Cambridge University Press, 2000) ISBN 9780521642569
- The Swiss Reformation (Manchester University Press, 2002) ISBN 9780719051180
- (editor with Emidio Campi) Architect of Reformation: An Introduction to Heinrich Bullinger, 1504-1575 (Baker Academic, 2004) ISBN 9780801028991
- Calvin (Yale University Press, 2009) ISBN 9780300170849
- John Calvin’s Institutes of the Christian Religion: A Biography. (Princeton University Press, 2016) ISBN 9781786845696
- (editor with Carl Trueman) The Oxford Handbook of Calvin and Calvinism (Oxford University Press, 2021) ISBN 9780191795527
- Zwingli: God's Armed Prophet (Yale University Press, 2021) ISBN 9780300258790
- The Bible: A Global History (Basic Books, 2024) ISBN 9781541619739
