= Elliott Horowitz =

American historian

Elliott S. Horowitz (1953-2017) was a Jewish American historian. A native of Queens, New York City, Horowitz was educated at Yeshivat Kerem be-Yavneh, and received his bachelor's degree from Princeton University in 1975. He received his doctorate from Yale in 1982. His dissertation was "Jewish confraternities in seventeenth-century Verona: a study in the social history of piety".

After moving to Israel, he taught Medieval and Early Modern Jewish History for thirty-two years, first at Ben Gurion University and from 1989-2014 at Bar Ilan University He also held numerous visiting positions at American universities, including Harvard, Yale, Rutgers, Johns Hopkins, Princeton, Toronto, Penn, and Oxford.

From 2004 until his death, Horowitz served as editor of the Jewish Quarterly Review, the oldest English-language journal devoted to Jewish studies. Horowitz contributed vitally to expanding the journal's horizons, approaches and subjects, helping shape it into one of the leading scholarly forums in the field of Jewish studies.

Horowitz’s monograph, Reckless Rites: Purim and the Legacy of Jewish Violence (2006), was a runner-up for the National Jewish Book Award. The book brought together his enduring scholarly curiosity about violence and the carnivalesque with an ethical concern for the way in which religion can be used and abused.

In 2014 Horowitz took early retirement and was appointed to the Oliver Smithies Visiting Fellowship at Balliol College, Oxford for the academic year 2015-6.

== Bibliography ==
=== Books ===
- Horowitz, Elliott S. (2006). Reckless Rites: Purim and the Legacy of Jewish Violence. Princeton, N.J.: Princeton University Press. ISBN 9780691124919. (Choice Outstanding Academic Titles for 2006, Runner-up for National Jewish Book Award for Jewish History 2006, Short-listed for Choice Magazine Outstanding Reference/Academic Book Award 2006)
  - Review by Goldberg SA. Annales. Histoire, Sciences Sociales 2012 Sep (Vol. 67, No. 3, pp. 823–827). Cambridge University Press. Review, by Kessler E. in Studies in Christian-Jewish Relations. 2008;2(2).
  - Review of Reckless Rites and related books. Magid, Shaul. Jews, Christians, and Muslims from the Ancient to the Modern World.) Princeton, NJ: Princeton University Press 2006.
- Horowitz, Elliott S., and Orfali, Moises (2002). The Mediterranean and the Jews: Society, Culture, and Economy in Early Modern Times. Ramat-Gan: Bar-Ilan University Press.

=== Selected articles ===
- Horowitz, E.S. (1989). "Coffee, Coffee Houses, and the Nocturnal Rituals of Early Modern Jewry".
- Horowitz, E.S. (1989). "The Eve of the Circumcision: A Chapter in the History of Jewish Nightlife". Journal of Social History. 23, no. 1: 45-70.
- Cohen E, Horowitz E. (1990). "In Search of the Sacred: Jews, Christians and Rituals of Marriage in the Later Middle Ages". Journal of medieval and Renaissance studies. 20(2):225-49.
- Horowitz E.S. (1999). "Too Jewish and other Jewish questions: a review essay". Modern Judaism. 19(2):195-206.
- Horowitz, E. (1992). "‘A Different Mode of Civility’: Lancelot Addison on the Jews of Barbary". Studies in Church History. 29:309-25.
- Horowitz, E. (1992 Dec). Towards a social history of Jewish popular religion: Obadiah of Bertinoro on the Jews of Palermo". Journal of Religious History. 17(2):138-51.
- Horowitz, E.S. (2006). "A Splendid Outburst of Spirituality". Introduction to Forum: Sefer Hasidim. Jewish Quarterly Review, 96(1), pp.v-vi.
- Horowitz, E.S. (2011 Apr 15). "Genesis 34 and the Legacies of Biblical Violence". The Blackwell Companion to Religion and Violence. pp. 163–82.
