= Andrew Louth =

English theologian (born 1944)

The Reverend Andrew Louth FBA
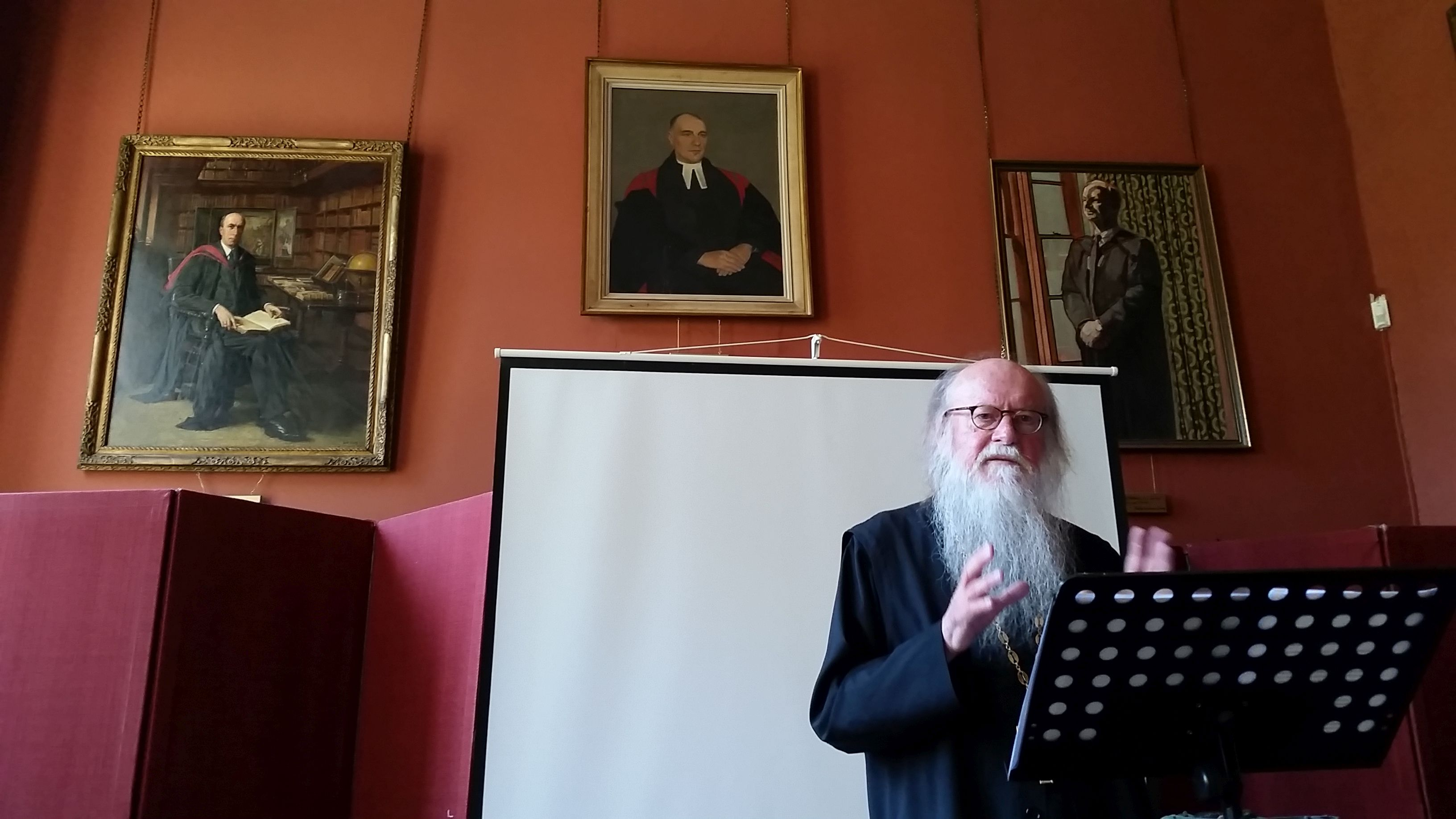
- Louth speaking at St Edmund Hall, Oxford, in 2017 in front of a portrait of A. B. Emden
- Born: 11 November 1944 (age 81); Louth, England

Ecclesiastical career
- Religion: Christianity (Anglican · Eastern Orthodox)
- Church: Church of England; Russian Orthodox Church
- Ordained: 1968 (Anglican); 2003 (Eastern Orthodox priest)

Academic background
- Education: University of Cambridge; University of Edinburgh

Academic work
- Discipline: History; theology
- Sub-discipline: Patristics
- Institutions: Worcester College, Oxford; Goldsmiths' College, London; Durham University

Andrew Louth FBA (/laʊθ/; born 11 November 1944) is an English theologian. He is an emeritus professor of patristic and Byzantine studies in the Department of Theology and Religion of Durham University. Louth has been at Durham University since 1996. Previously he taught at the University of Oxford (mostly patristics) and at Goldsmiths' College in Byzantine and early medieval history. He is a fellow of the British Academy and was a member of the British Academy Council from 2011 to 2014. He was President of the Ecclesiastical History Society (2009–10).

Born on 11 November 1944 in Louth, Lincolnshire, he was educated at the universities of Cambridge and Edinburgh. His former students include Romanian theologian and politician Mihail Neamțu. On the theology of Dumitru Stăniloae (1903–1993), Louth takes a position similar to Neamțu, stating that Stăniloae's apologetics was shaped by confessional bias and rhetorical clichés.

Formerly an Anglican priest, he converted to Eastern Orthodoxy in 1989 and was ordained as an Eastern Orthodox priest in 2003.

== Selected publications ==
- Louth, Andrew (2007), Greek East and Latin West: The Church, AD 681–1071, Church History, 3, St. Vladimirs Seminary Press, ISBN 978-0881413205
- Louth, Andrew (2002), St. John Damascene: Tradition and Originality in Byzantine Theology, Oxford early Christian studies., Oxford University Press, ISBN 9780199275274
- Louth, Andrew; Raitt, Jill (1998), Wisdom of the Byzantine Church: Evagrios of Pontos and Maximos the Confessor, Paine Lectures in Religion, 1997, Dept. of Religious Studies, University of Missouri, OCLC 38570047
- Louth, Andrew (1996), Maximus the Confessor, Early Church Fathers, Routledge London, ISBN 0203991273
- Discerning the Mystery: An Essay on the Nature of Theology, Clarendon, ISBN 0198261969
- Mary and the Mystery of the Incarnation: An Essay on the Mother of God in the Theology of Karl Barth (Fairacres, 1977) ISBN 9780728300736
- (with Thomas C. Oden and Marco Conti) Genesis 1–11; Volume 1. (Taylor & Francis, 2001). ISBN 1579582206.
- The Origins of the Christian Mystical Tradition, from Plato to Denys (Oxford University Press, 2007) ISBN 9780199291403
- Introducing Eastern Orthodox Theology (IVP Academic, 2013) ISBN 9780830840458
- Modern Orthodox Thinkers: From the Philokalia to the Present (IVP Academic, 2015) ISBN 9780830851218

== See also ==
- Russian Orthodox Diocese of Sourozh

== Sources ==
- Behr, John (2011). "Andrew Louth". In Andreopoulos, Andreas; Casiday, Augustine; Harrison, Carol (eds.). Meditations of the Heart: The Psalms in Early Christian Thought and Practice; Essays in Honour of Andrew Louth. Studia Traditionis Theologiae. Vol. 8. Turnhout, Belgium: Brepols. pp. ix–xiii. doi:10.1484/M.STT-EB.6.09070802050003050304030306. ISBN 978-2-503-54021-4.

Professional and academic associations
Preceded by Bill Sheils	President of the Ecclesiastical History Society; 2009–2010	Succeeded by Sheridan Gilley
