= Parvis (disambiguation) =

Parvis may refer to:

- Parvise, a feature of church architecture
- Parvīz, Persian name
- Parvis (surname)
