= General Carleton =

General Carleton may refer to:

- Guy Carleton (United States Army officer) (1857–1946), U.S. Army major general
- Guy Carleton, 1st Baron Dorchester (1724–1808), British Army general
- Henry Alexander Carleton (1814–1900), British Army general
- James Henry Carleton (1814–1873), Union Army brigadier general and brevet major general

== See also ==
- Mark Carleton-Smith (born 1964), British Army general
