= James Carleton Paget =

British biblical scholar

- Born: 16 February 1966 (age 60)
- Parent(s): John Paget; Sheila Lowther

Academic background
- Education: Queens' College, Cambridge

Academic work
- Discipline: Biblical studies; history
- Sub-discipline: Ecclesiastical history; New Testament studies
- Institutions: Peterhouse, Cambridge

James Nicholas Carleton Paget (born 16 February 1966) is Senior Lecturer in New Testament Studies in the Faculty of Divinity of the University of Cambridge. He is a Fellow and Tutor of Peterhouse, and was educated at Eton College and Queens' College, Cambridge. The son of John Byng Oswald Carleton Paget and Sheila Anne Lowther, his great-great-grandfather was Henry Carleton, and his great-uncle was John Lowther.

Carleton Paget is co-editor of the Journal of Ecclesiastical History.

== Works ==
=== Books ===
- Paget, James Carleton (1994). The Epistle of Barnabas: Outlook and Background. Wissenschaftliche Untersuchungen zum Neuen Testament, 2. Reihe, 64. Tubingen: Mohr Siebeck. ISBN 9783161461613. OCLC 31720983. - revised thesis
- ——— (2010). Jews, Christians and Jewish Christians in Antiquity. Wissenschaftliche Untersuchungen zum Neuen Testament. Vol. 251. Tubingen: Mohr Siebeck. ISBN 9783161503122. OCLC 567988309.

=== Edited by ===
- ———; Aitken, J. K., eds. (2014). The Jewish-Greek tradition in antiquity and the Byzantine Empire. New York: Cambridge University Press. ISBN 9781107001633. OCLC 871192100.
- ———; Thate, Michael J., eds. (2016). Albert Schweitzer in thought and action: a life in parts. Albert Schweitzer library. Syracuse, NY: Syracuse University Press. ISBN 9780815653684. OCLC 962323104.
