= Peter Marshall (historian) =

Scottish historian (born 1964)

Peter Marshall FRHistS FBA
- Born: 26 October 1964 (age 61); Orkney, Scotland
- Awards: Wolfson History Prize (2018)

Academic background
- Education: Kirkwall Grammar School
- Alma mater: University College, Oxford
- Thesis: Attitudes of the English People to Priests and Priesthood, 1500–1553 (1990)
- Doctoral advisor: Susan Brigden

Academic work
- Discipline: History
- Sub-discipline: Early modern English history; history of Christianity; social history
- Institutions: Ampleforth College; University of Warwick
- Main interests: Reformation
- Notable works: Heretics and Believers (2017)

Peter Marshall FRHistS FBA (born 26 October 1964) is a Scottish historian and academic, known for his work on the Reformation and its impact on the British Isles and Europe. He is professor of history at the University of Warwick.

== Biography ==
Marshall was born on 26 October 1964 in Orkney, Scotland. He was educated at Kirkwall Grammar School, before studying at University College, Oxford. His doctoral thesis was titled Attitudes of the English People to Priests and Priesthood, 1500–1553. His doctoral supervisor was Susan Brigden.

Marshall began his career as a teacher: he was a history teacher at Ampleforth College, a Roman Catholic private school in North Yorkshire. In 1994, he joined the University of Warwick as a lecturer. He was promoted to senior lecturer in 2001, and to reader in 2004. He was appointed professor of history in 2006.

Between 2023 and 2024 Marshall served as President of the Ecclesiastical History Society.

== Honours ==
Marshall was the winner of the 2018 Wolfson History Prize for his book Heretics and Believers: A History of the English Reformation. In July 2018, he was elected a Fellow of the British Academy (FBA), the United Kingdom's national academy for the humanities and social sciences. He is also an elected Fellow of the Royal Historical Society (FRHistS).

== Published works ==
=== Books authored ===
- The Catholic Priesthood and the English Reformation. Oxford: Clarendon Press. 1994. doi:10.1093/acprof:oso/9780198204480.001.0001. ISBN 978-0-19-820448-0.
- Beliefs and the Dead in Reformation England. Oxford: Oxford University Press. 2002. doi:10.1093/acprof:oso/9780198207733.001.0001. ISBN 978-0-19-820773-3.
- Reformation England, 1480–1642 (1st ed.). London: Hodder Education. 2003. ISBN 978-0-340-70623-7.
- Religious Identities in Henry VIII's England. Aldershot, England: Ashgate. 2006. ISBN 978-0-7546-5390-5.
- Mother Leakey and the Bishop: A Ghost Story. Oxford: Oxford University Press. 2007. ISBN 978-0-19-927371-3.
- The Reformation: A Very Short Introduction. Oxford: Oxford University Press. 2009. ISBN 978-0-19-923131-7.
- Reformation England, 1480–1642 (2nd ed.). London: Bloomsbury Academic. 2012. ISBN 978-1849665292.
- 1517: Martin Luther and the Invention of the Reformation. Oxford: Oxford University Press. 2017. ISBN 978-0-19-968201-0.
- Heretics and Believers: A History of the English Reformation. New Haven, Connecticut: Yale University Press. 2017. ISBN 978-0-300-17062-7.
- Invisible Worlds: Death, Religion and the Supernatural in England, 1500–1700. London: SPCK. 2017. ISBN 978-0-281-07522-5.
- Storm's Edge: Life, Death and Magic in the Islands of Orkney. London: William Collins. 2024. ISBN 978-0-00-839439-4.

=== Books edited ===
- The Impact of the English Reformation, 1500–1640. London: Arnold. 1997. ISBN 978-0-340-67709-4.
- The Place of the Dead: Death and Remembrance in Late Medieval and Early Modern Europe. With Gordon, Bruce. Cambridge, England: Cambridge University Press. 2000. ISBN 978-0-521-64518-8.
- The Beginnings of English Protestantism. With Ryrie, Alec. Cambridge, England: Cambridge University Press. 2002. ISBN 978-0-521-80274-1.
- Angels in the Early Modern World. With Walsham, Alexandra. Cambridge, England: Cambridge University Press. 2006. ISBN 978-0-521-84332-4.
- Catholic Gentry in English Society: The Throckmortons of Coughton from Reformation to Emancipation. With Scott, Geoffrey. Farnham, England: Ashgate. ISBN 978-0-7546-6432-1.
- The Oxford Illustrated History of the Reformation. Oxford: Oxford University Press. 2015. ISBN 978-0-19-959548-8.

Professional and academic associations
Preceded by Katy Cubitt	President of the Ecclesiastical History Society; 2023-2024	Succeeded by Michael Snape
