= Rosalind Hill =

English historian (1908–1997)

- Born: Rosalind Mary Theodosia Hill; 14 November 1908; Neston-cum-Parkgate, England
- Died: 11 January 1997 (aged 88); Radlett, England

Academic background
- Education: St Hilda's College, Oxford

Academic work
- Discipline: History
- Sub-discipline: Ecclesiastical history; medieval history
- Institutions: Westfield College, London
- Main interests: Crusades

Rosalind Mary Theodosia Hill (14 November 1908 – 11 January 1997) was an English historian who for 39 years was a lecturer, Reader and Professor in History at Westfield College, a constituent college of the University of London.

== Biography ==
Rosalind Hill was born on 14 November 1908 at Leighton House, Neston-cum-Parkgate, Cheshire, the youngest of three daughters and four children of Ellen Mary Stratford, née Danson and Sir Norman Hill (1863–1944), a prominent shipping solicitor and notary in Liverpool who acted as secretary of the Liverpool Steamship Owners' Association from 1893 to 1924 and was Chairman of the Board of Trade advisory committee on shipping from 1907 to 1937. He was knighted in 1911 and created baronet in 1919. When Sir Norman built Green Place, a large house at Stockbridge in Hampshire, Rosalind Hill immersed herself in local life and tradition, especially after she inherited the title of Lady of the Manor following the death of her brother during the Second World War. Her devotion to the village was such that she is commemorated by Rosalind Hill House, a home for the elderly in the village. She donated Green Place to the National Trust in 1946.

Hill was educated at the Downs School in Seaford in Sussex before studying history at St Hilda's College, Oxford (1928–1931), where she gained a first-class degree in modern history before taking a Bachelor of Letters degree in 1932 with a thesis on English Ecclesiastical Letter-Books of the Thirteenth Century which was privately printed in 1937. For a short period she taught medieval history at University College, Leicester, where John H. Plumb was among her students.

Plumb later wrote of her:

She was very young and nervous: she fluttered her papers, talked too quickly, and went pink-cheeked with terror, yet she managed to bring the medieval world alive. She knew the problems it was vital for a young historian to know about. ... I never missed a lecture. Medieval history sprang to life and I became, and remained, an addict.

In 1937 Hill was appointed a lecturer in History at Westfield College, and here she was to remain for the rest of her academic career as lecturer (1937–1955); Reader in History (1955–1971); and Professor of History (1971–1976), retiring as Professor Emerita and Vice-Principal. As a scholar and researcher she was particularly active in her work with medieval bishops' registers, especially those of Oliver Sutton of Lincoln in The Rolls and Register of Bishop Oliver Sutton 1280–1299 (published in eight volumes, 1948–1986), and for her edition of the first chronicle of the First Crusade, Gesta Francorum et Aliorum Hierosolimitanorum (1962). Her love of animals was expressed in her pamphlet Both Small and Great Beasts (1953) written on behalf of the University Federation for Animal Welfare and illustrated by the cartoonist Fougasse and which explored the treatment of animals during the Middle Ages. She was Secretary (1963–1973) and President (1973–1974) of the Ecclesiastical History Society and Editor and Chairman of the Canterbury and York Society. She was also a member of the seminars on the Crusades at the Institute of Historical Research.

At Westfield College Hill worked with Mary Stocks (principal of Westfield College 1939-1951) who had been heavily involved in women's suffrage. Hill was interviewed about Stocks and their time at Westfield College, by the historian, Brian Harrison, as part of the Suffrage Interviews project, titled Oral evidence on the suffragette and suffragist movements: the Brian Harrison interviews.

After retiring Hill shared a house with former Westfield colleagues Christina Barratt and Gwen Chambers at 7 Loom Lane in Radlett in Hertfordshire and here she died of heart failure on 11 January 1997 aged 88 before being cremated at St Albans. She never married.

== Select publications ==
- Public Penance: Some Problems of a Thirteenth-Century Bishop, History, vol 36 (1951), pp 213–226.
- Both Small and Great Beasts: On the Attitude of Men towards Animals in the Middle Ages (London, 1953).
- The Theory and Practice of Excommunication in Medieval England, History, vol 42 (1957), pp 1–11.
- Gesta Francorum et aliorum Hierosolimitanorum (London, 1962).
- Unfashionable History: An Inaugural Lecture (London, 1972).
- Uncovenanted Blessings of Ecclesiastical Records, Studies in Church History, vol 11 (Oxford, 1975), pp 135–146.
- Air and Portentous Heresy’, Studies in Church History, vol 13 (Oxford, 1976), pp 135–140.
- The Christian view of the Muslims at the time of the First Crusade, The Eastern Mediterranean Lands in the Period of the Crusades, ed PM Holt (Warminster, 1977), pp 1–80.

For a full bibliography of Hill's publications to 1978, see Medieval Women: Dedicated and Presented to Professor Rosalind M T Hill on the Occasion of her Seventieth Birthday, ed D Baker, Studies in Church History: Subsidia 1 (Oxford, 1978), pp 381–385.

Professional and academic associations
Preceded by Geoffrey Nuttall	President of the Ecclesiastical History Society; 1973–1974	Succeeded by Basil Hall
