= Mark Rankin =

Mark Rankin may refer to:

- Mark Rankin (record engineer), British record and mixing engineer and music producer,
- Mark Rankin (vocalist), vocalist with Scottish band Gun
- Mark Rankin (editor of Reformation), professor at James Madison University in Harrisonburg, VA
