= Parvis (surname) =

Parvis is a surname. Notable people with the surname include:

- Paul Parvis, British Patristic scholar
- Sara Parvis, British Patristic scholar

== See also ==
- Parviz
