= Polydore Vergil =

Italian-English scholar (c. 1470–1555)

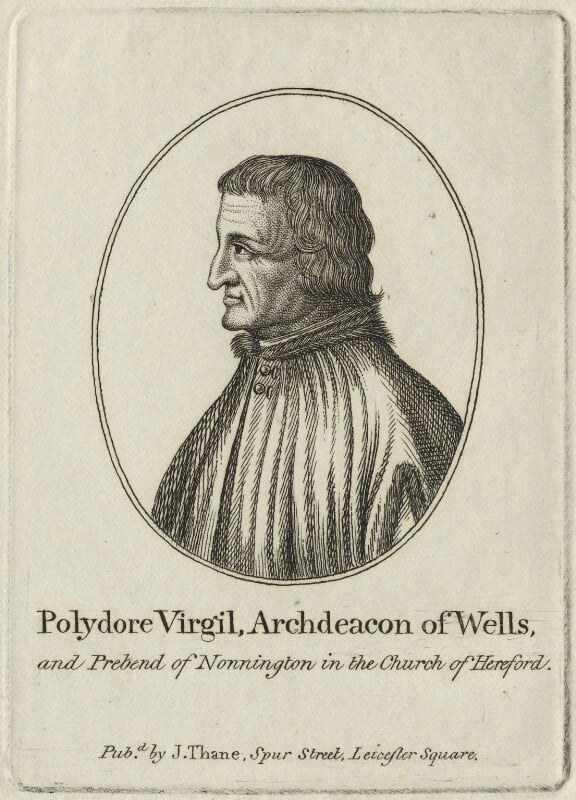
- Polydore Vergil
- Born: c. 1470; Urbino, Duchy of Urbino
- Died: 18 April 1555 (aged 84–85); Urbino, Duchy of Urbino
- Resting place: Duomo di Urbino (cathedral)
- Other name: Polidoro Virgili
- Occupations: Historian; scholar; diplomat; priest

Polydore Vergil or Virgil (Italian: Polidoro Virgili, commonly Latinised as Polydorus Vergilius; c. 1470 – 18 April 1555), widely known as Polydore Vergil of Urbino, was an Italian humanist scholar, historian, priest and diplomat, who spent much of his life in England. He is particularly remembered for his works the Proverbiorum libellus (1498), a collection of Latin proverbs; De inventoribus rerum (1499), a history of discoveries and origins; and the Anglica Historia (drafted by 1513; printed in 1534), an influential history of England. He has been dubbed the "Father of English History".

Vergil is sometimes referred to in contemporary documents as Polydore Vergil Castellensis or Castellen, leading some to assume that he was a kinsman of his patron, Cardinal Adriano Castellesi. However, it is more likely that the alias simply indicates that he was in Castellesi's service.

== Biography ==
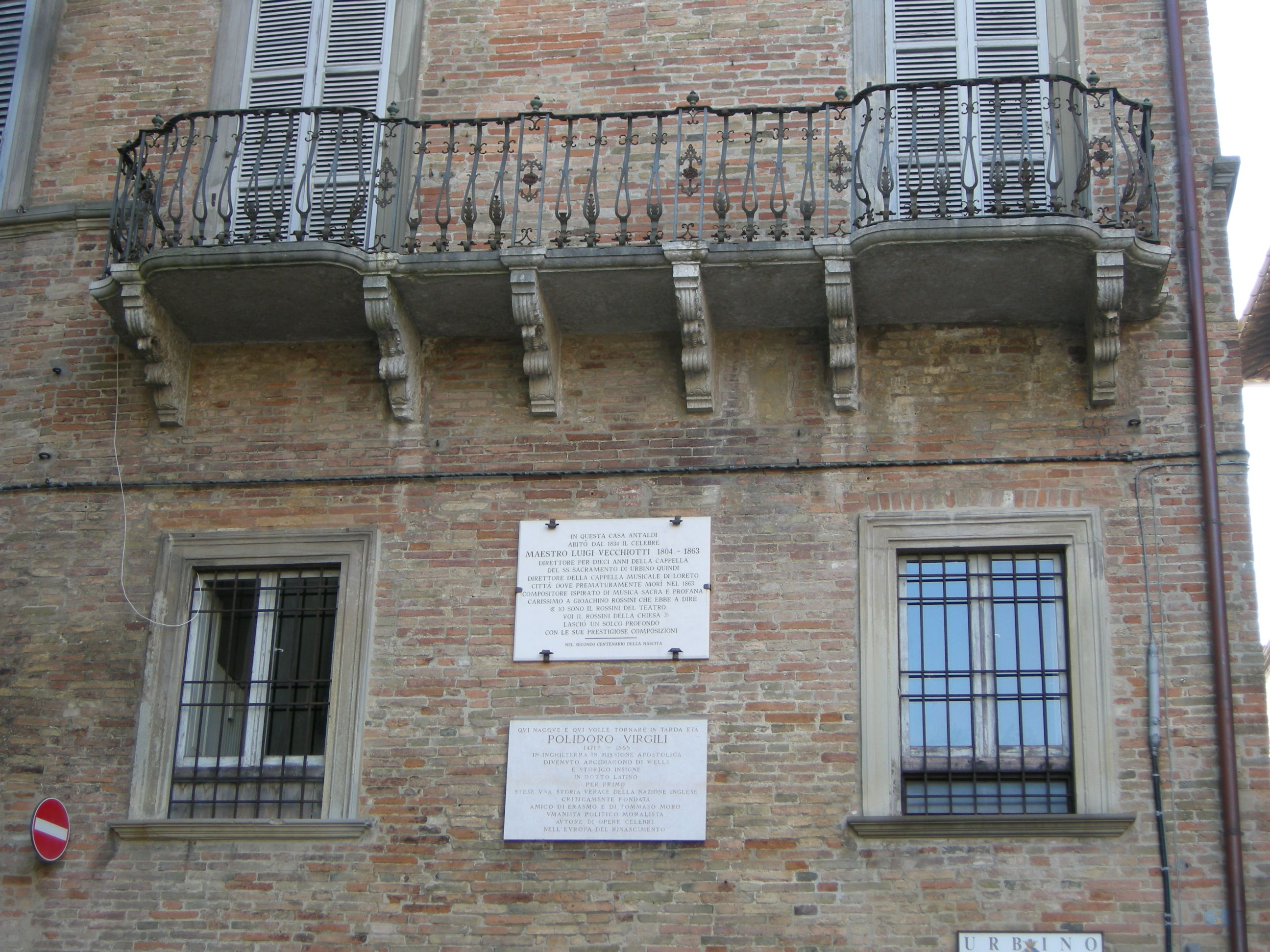
Vergil's family home and alleged birthplace in Urbino, marked with a plaque (the lower of the two)

=== Early life in Italy ===
Vergil was born in about 1470 either at Urbino, or more probably at Fermignano, within the Duchy of Urbino. His father, Giorgio di Antonio, owned a dispensary. His grandfather, Antonio Virgili, "a man well skilled in medicine and astrology", had taught philosophy at the University of Paris; as did Polydore's own brother, Giovanni-Matteo Virgili, at Ferrara and Padua. Another brother, Girolamo, was a merchant trading with England. The niece of Polydore Vergil, Faustina, married Lorenzo Borgogelli, count of Fano, from whom descend the family of Borgogelli Virgili.

Polydore was educated at the University of Padua, and possibly at Bologna. He was ordained by 1496. He was probably in the service of Guidobaldo da Montefeltro, Duke of Urbino, before 1498, as in the dedication of his Proverbiorum Libellus (April 1498) he styles himself Guido's client. His second book, De Inventoribus Rerum, was dedicated to Guido's tutor, Lodovico Odassio, in August 1499.

At some point prior to 1502 Polydore entered the service of Pope Alexander VI.

=== Move to England ===
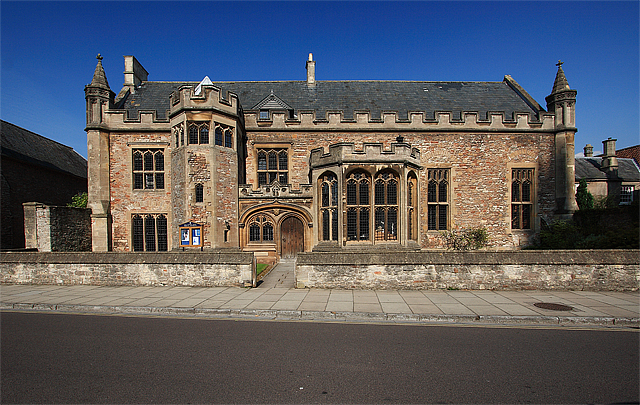
The "Old Archdeaconry" in Wells, traditionally identified as Vergil's residence there. Now the Music School of Wells Cathedral School

In 1502, Vergil travelled to England as the deputy of Cardinal Adriano Castellesi in the office of Collector of Peter's Pence, and, in practice, the Cardinal's agent in a variety of affairs. In October 1504 he was enthroned Bishop of Bath and Wells as proxy for Adriano; and in 1508 he himself was installed as Archdeacon of Wells. He probably spent little time in Wells, but was active as the chapter's representative in London. He also donated a set of hangings for the quire of Wells Cathedral. He held other ecclesiastical sinecures, including, from 1503, the living of Church Langton, Leicestershire; from 1508 prebends in Lincoln and Hereford Cathedrals; and from 1513 the prebend of Oxgate in St Paul's Cathedral.

As an established author, and a representative of Italian humanist learning, Vergil was received in England as a minor celebrity, and was welcomed at court by King Henry VII, who was more interested in humanist scholars than his predecessors. He recognized the advantages humanism would offer to legitimise his claim to the throne, which was still vulnerable to challenge after his victory at the Battle of Bosworth Field, and the role that diffusion of humanist education would take in establishing a more educated, bureaucratic government than the feudal aristocracy. It was at the King's behest that Vergil began work on his Anglica Historia, a new history of England, probably as early as 1505, retelling the history of the Wars of the Roses to emphasise that the war ended with the new monarch's reign.

On 22 October 1510, he was naturalised English.

Early in 1515, through the intrigues of Andrea Ammonio, who sought the subcollectorship for himself, an ill-judged letter from Vergil was intercepted by the authorities. It contained what was read as implied criticism of both Thomas Wolsey and Henry VIII, and as a result Vergil was imprisoned in April in the Tower of London. His supporters and advocates included Pope Leo X, who wrote to the King on his behalf. From prison Vergil wrote to Wolsey, begging that the approaching Christmas season – a time which witnessed the restitution of a world – might also see his pardon: his letter's tone has been described as "almost blasphemous". He was released before Christmas 1515, but never regained his subcollectorship.

=== Return visits to Italy and death ===
Although Vergil lived predominantly in England from 1502 onwards, he paid several return visits to Urbino, in 1513–14, 1516–17 and 1533–34. In 1534, Francesco Maria, Duke of Urbino, in recognition of his literary achievements, admitted Vergil and his family to the ranks of the nobility.

In 1546 Vergil resigned the Archdeaconry of Wells to the Crown, perhaps in anticipation of his retirement to Italy. He was licensed to return to Urbino in 1550, and probably left England for the last time in the summer of 1553. He died in Urbino on 18 April 1555.

== Works ==
=== Perotti's Cornucopiae ===
Vergil published his first work in 1496. This was an edition of Niccolò Perotti's Cornucopiae latinae linguae, a commentary on Martial's Epigrams.

=== Proverbiorum Libellus (Adagia) ===
Vergil's Proverbiorum Libellus (Venice, 1498), retitled in later editions as Adagiorum Liber, and often known as the Adagia, was a collection of Latin proverbs. It was the first such collection printed, preceding the similar Adagia of Erasmus by two years. The initial controversy between the two authors that arose from their rival claims for priority (Erasmus still believed as late as 1533 that his work had been the earlier) gave place to a sincere friendship. The first edition of Vergil's work contained 306 proverbs taken from classical sources. A second, expanded, edition appeared in 1521: it contained a further series of 431 Biblical proverbs, and was dedicated to Wolsey's follower, Richard Pace. This edition is preceded by an interesting letter sent in June 1519, which gives the names of many of Vergil's English friends, including Thomas More, William Warham, Thomas Linacre and Cuthbert Tunstall.

The Adagia ran through about 20 editions down to 1550.

=== De Inventoribus Rerum ===
Vergil's De Inventoribus Rerum was published in 1499, having been written in only three months. It was a history of origins and inventions, describing in three books the "first begetters" of all human activities. Book I investigated the origin of the gods and the word "God", along with such matters as the creation, marriage, religion and learning. Book II covered, among other topics, the origins of law, time, military science, money, precious metals and art. Book III covered, again among other topics, the origins of agriculture, architecture, towns, theatres, tools and materials, maritime navigation, commerce and prostitution.

For the edition of 1521, Vergil added five more books, devoted to the initia institorum rei Christianae, i.e. the origins of Christian rites and institutions. He probably thought that this addition would be a popular one, but it was also a concession towards critics who had labelled the De Inventoribus a work of heretics and depravity. The work nonetheless included criticisms of monks, priestly celibacy, indulgences, and of the policies and constitutional status of the papacy. As a consequence it was placed on the Index Librorum Prohibitorum (papal list of prohibited books) in 1564: an expurgated text, sanctioned by Gregory XIII, was published in 1576.

De Inventoribus was, however, exceedingly popular, and was quickly translated into French (1521), German (1537), English (1546) and Spanish (1551). Thirty Latin editions had been published by the time Vergil died in 1555; and the work eventually ran to around 70 Latin editions, and another 35 translations. The English edition of 1546 was an abridgement made by Thomas Langley, which also proved highly successful and was reprinted several times.

The work is notable for the immense industry that went into its compilation, and the range of ancient and modern writers on which Vergil was able to draw.

=== Gildas …de calamitate, excidio et conquestu Britanniae ===
In 1525 Vergil published an edition of Gildas' 6th-century history, De Excidio et Conquestu Britanniae, probably at Antwerp. He dedicated it to Cuthbert Tunstall, Bishop of London. This was the first critical edition of a British historical text. In publishing it, Vergil reflected a growing interest in post-classical texts among German and Italian scholars. This interest sprang mainly from self-conscious nationalism which makes it curious at least that a foreigner chose a text about Britain. Vergil did, however, have a motive; this project provided a background for his anti-Arthurian position. Tunstall supplied one of the source manuscripts (hence the dedication), and the work of editing was undertaken by Vergil and Robert Ridley. Their editing was for the most part conscientious, although they rearranged certain words in the interests of clarity, and also suppressed a few anti-clerical passages.

=== Dialogus de Prodigiis ===
Vergil's Dialogus de Prodigiis was written in 1526–27, and printed in 1531. It was dedicated to Francesco Maria, Duke of Urbino. This treatise, in three books, takes the form of a Latin dialogue between Vergil and his Cambridge friend Robert Ridley on the subject of the natural and the supernatural, and whether credence should be given to such alleged phenomena as prodigious events and portents. The setting for the dialogue is the open air, at Vergil's country house near London. Vergil's role is to state the problems and supply the historical illustrations; his friend's to explain, rationalise and deprecate as best he can.

The De Prodigiis also achieved great popularity, and was translated into Italian (1543), English (1546) and Spanish (1550).

=== Anglica Historia ===
Vergil's history of England, the Anglica Historia, was begun at the instigation of King Henry VII, perhaps as early as 1506. This first version was completed in 1512–13. However, the work was not published until 1534; and four distinct versions can therefore be identified:

1. Manuscript written in 1512–13: covering events up to 1513 (MS)
2. First edition, Basel, 1534, folio; covering events up to 1509 (A)
3. Second edition, Basel, 1546, folio: covering events up to 1509 (B)
4. Third edition, Basel, 1555, folio: covering events up to 1537 (C)

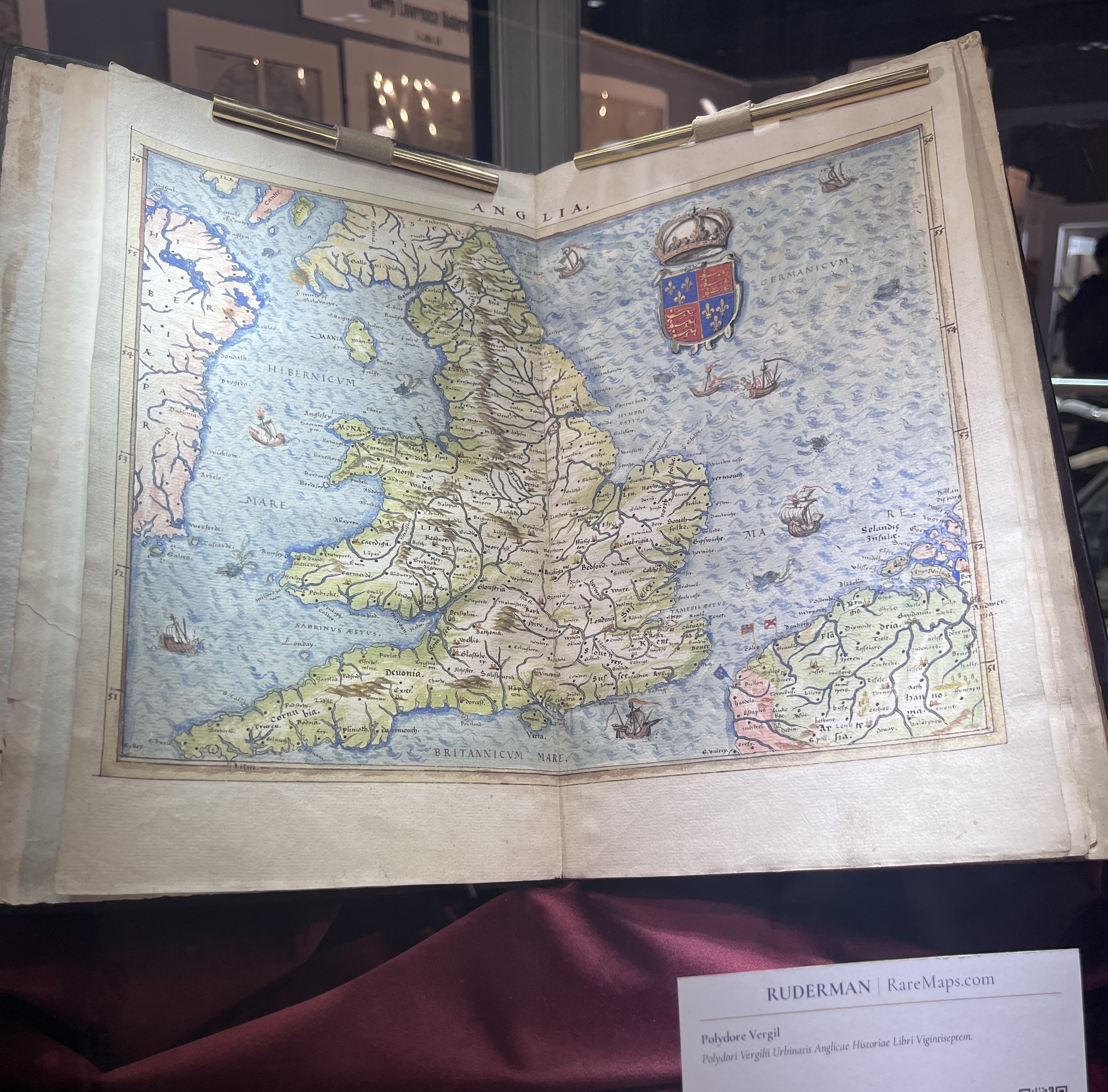
The 1555 Anglica Historia on display

The manuscript version is now held in the Vatican Library. Comprising two volumes, it was presented to the ducal library at Urbino in 1613 by Vergil's grand-nephew. Although he stated in prefatory notes that the manuscript was written in Vergil's hand – an assessment fully supported by the palaeographic evidence – it was at one time sometimes attributed to Federico Veterani. This misunderstanding arose from a colophon in the second volume, in a different hand, stating that "I, Federico Veterani, wrote the whole work". A possible explanation is that Vergil left it in the care of Veterani, who inscribed the colophon to associate it with his other treasures so that it would not be lost or damaged during the Papal invasion in Urbino in 1516. Further isolated notes in Veterani's hand, nearly all directions to a binder or printer, are found throughout the manuscript. The most plausible interpretation of the evidence is that Vergil intended to present a fine manuscript (rather than a printed book) to Henry VIII, and commissioned the work from Veterani, the most famous copyist of the day. However, no such copy by Veterani is known to have survived.

The manuscript version of the work was divided into 25 books. Books I–VII described the early history of England up to the Norman conquest; Book VIII dealt with the reigns of William I and William II; and the following books covered one reign per book, ending in book XXV which dealt with the beginning of Henry VIII's reign to 1513.

In 1534 the first printed version of the work appeared, a folio with decorations from John Bebel's press in Basel. While this edition was broadly similar to the manuscript, it incorporated substantial changes, and it seems that Vergil effectively made a fresh start using the manuscript as a guideline. The rewriting appears to have taken place between 1521 and 1524 (based on one reference to his having been archdeacon of Wells for fourteen years; and another allusion to "this day, which is 1524"). Book VII of the manuscript was now split into two parts, the new book VIII running from the death of Cnut to 1066; while the reigns of the first two Norman kings, previously covered in a single book, were also divided between two books. The work had therefore gained two books, but now ended with book XXVI in 1509, no longer extending into the reign of Henry VIII.

The second edition appeared in 1546. This version also ended in 1509, but was much revised. The revisions included rewordings for political reasons, a greater emphasis on the civic history of London, and stylistic improvements of the Latin for European readers.

The third edition was published in 1555, the year of Vergil's death. In this case the revisions were minor and largely stylistic. However, Vergil added a new book (XXVII) giving an account of Henry VIII's reign to 1537, and which included a highly critical portrait of Wolsey. Vergil claimed that most of his work on the last book was done contemporaneously, and that the work was interrupted by a visit to Italy. This must refer to his visit of 1533–34, and the entire period from 1530 to 1537 is in fact treated cursorily. Denys Hay finds it reasonable to suppose that at first Vergil planned this book to describe events up to 1530, but that he postponed the publication of it due to the political uncertainties in England, enabling him to extend the terminal date.

Vergil drew on an impressively wide range of sources for his work, including published books and oral testimony. He claimed to have been diligent in collecting materials, and to have drawn on the work of foreign as well as English historians. For this reason, he remarked, the English, Scots and French would find things reported in his pages far differently from the way they were used to hearing them within their own countries. In his search for information he applied to James IV of Scotland for a list of the Scottish kings and their annals; but not even his friendship with Gavin Douglas could make him accept the historical theories of the latter, who traced the pedigree of the Scots down from the banished son of an Athenian king and Scota, daughter of the Egyptian Pharaoh.

Vergil opened the Anglica Historia with a passage heavily influenced by Caesar's Commentarii de Bello Gallico:

Britannia omnis...diuiditur in partes quatuor: quarum unam incolunt Angli, aliam Scoti, tertiam Vualli, quartam Cornubienses. Hi omnes uel lingua; uel moribus seu institutis inter se differunt.

In an early English translation, this is rendered as:

The whole Countrie of Britaine...is divided into iiij partes; wherof the one is inhabited of Englishmen, the other of Scottes, the third of Wallshemen, and the fowerth of Cornishe people. Which all differ emonge them selves, either in tongue, either in manners, or ells in lawes and ordinaunces.

=== Other works ===
Vergil published a Commentariolum in Dominicam Precem ("Commentary on the Lord's Prayer") at Basel in 1525, accompanying an edition of the De Inventoribus Rerum. His comments owed much to Erasmus' Precatio Dominica in septem portiones distributa (1523).

At Erasmus' request, Vergil worked on a translation from the Greek of Dio Chrysostom's De Perfecto Monacho, which he published in 1533. It was reprinted in 1541 and 1550.

In 1545, he published his last work, the Dialogorum libri, a collection of Latin dialogues, divided into three parts as De patientia, De vita perfecta, and De veritate et mendacio.

== Commemoration ==
Vergil was buried in Urbino Cathedral, in the chapel of St Andrew which he himself had endowed. In 1613, it was agreed that a memorial stone should be set over his tomb. This was eventually put in place in 1631, with an inscription stating that his fame would "live for ever in the world". However, it is believed to have been lost when the cathedral was severely damaged by an earthquake in 1789.

Vergil's family home and alleged birthplace in Urbino (now a property of the University of Urbino) is marked by a plaque; and there is also a bust of him in the city, unveiled in 2000.

Vergil is among the worthies whose portraits were painted in c.1618–19 on the frieze in what is now the Upper Reading Room of the Bodleian Library, Oxford.

== Reputation and legacy ==
In continental Europe, Vergil is principally remembered for the De Inventoribus Rerum and the Adagia: these are the works which secured his reputation before he ever came to England, and which he himself regarded as his masterpieces, writing "I, Polydore, was the first of the Romans to treat of these two matters". The De Inventoribus receives a mention, for example, in Cervantes' Don Quixote (1605–15).

In England, however, Vergil is more often remembered as author of the Anglica Historia. The work is an important primary source in its own right for the period 1460–1537, and as a secondary source continued to exert an influence on English historiography into the 19th century. It provided the chronicler Edward Hall with much of his sense of 15th-century English history, and so fed into the history plays of William Shakespeare.

A particularly controversial element of Vergil's work in England was the scepticism he expressed – first in his edition of Gildas, and then in the Anglica Historia – towards the traditional account of the early history of Britain derived from Geoffrey of Monmouth, and in particular towards the question of the historicity of King Arthur. This criticism touched a patriotic nerve with the antiquary John Leland, who responded forcefully, first in an unpublished tract, written perhaps in 1536, the Codrus sive Laus et Defensio Gallofridi Arturii contra Polydorum Vergilium ("Codrus", a reference to Vergil, was a type-name drawn from Juvenal for an offensive hack-poet); and afterwards in a longer published treatment, the Assertio inclytissimi Arturii regis Britannia (1544). Although Leland was critical of Vergil's views in the Assertio, he treated his opponent with respect, acknowledging his intelligence and his mastery of Latin style.

On another contentious issue, Vergil came down in favour of the claims of the University of Cambridge to be a more ancient foundation than the University of Oxford. When this was mentioned in a debate in the House of Commons in 1628, the Oxonian Edward Littleton sneered, "What have we to do with Polydore Vergil? One Vergil was a poet, the other a liar."

Other English readers also reacted vehemently to what seemed to be criticisms of their national history. John Bale in 1544 accused Vergil of "polutynge our Englyshe chronycles most shamefullye with his Romishe lyes and other Italyshe beggerye". An anonymous contemporary described him as "that most rascall dogge knave in the worlde", claiming that "he had the randsackings of all the Englishe lybraryes, and when he had extracted what he pleased he burnt those famous velome manuscripts, and made himself father to other mens workes". This charge of burning manuscripts was widely reported. John Caius in 1574, for example, asserted that Vergil had "committed as many of our ancient and manuscript historians to the flames as would have filled a waggon, that the faults of his own work might pass undiscovered". William Lambarde in 1576 commented that "as [Vergil] was by office Collector of the Peter pence to the Popes gain and lucre, so sheweth he himselfe throughout by profession, a covetous gatherer of lying Fables, fained to advaunce the Popish Religion, Kingdome, and Myter". Henry Peacham in 1622 again accused Vergil of having "burned and embezeled the best and most ancient Records and Monuments of our Abbeies, Priories, and Cathedrall Churches, under colour … of making search for all such monuments, manusc. records, Legier bookes, &c. as might make for his purpose".

However, one of Peacham's contemporaries, the Leicestershire antiquary William Burton, cast Vergil in a more positive light, describing him as "a man of singular invention, good judgement, and good reading, and a true lover of antiquities". In the 19th century, Vergil's importance to English historiography finally began to be acknowledged, as "historians of Tudor England realized the scope of his achievement in the Anglica Historia".

== Modern editions/translations of works ==
=== De inventoribus rerum ===
- Vergil, Polydore (1868). Hammond, William A. (ed.). De Rerum Inventoribus. Translated by Langley, John. New York: Agathynian Club. An English translation of Books 1–9 (with some abridgements), originally published in London in 1663.
- Beginnings and Discoveries: Polydore Vergil's De inventoribus rerum. Translated by Weiss, Beno; Pérez, Louis C. Nieuwkoop: De Graaf. 1997. ISBN 9060044290. An English translation of Books 1–8, based on the 1546 Lyon edition.
- Vergil, Polydore (2002). Copenhaver, Brian P. (ed.). On Discovery. I Tatti Renaissance Library. Cambridge, MA: Harvard University Press. ISBN 0-674-00789-1. Parallel Latin and English texts of Books 1–3, collating early editions to 1553–55.

=== Anglica Historia ===
- Vergil, Polydore (1846). Ellis, Sir Henry (ed.). Polydore Vergil's English History, from an early translation preserved among the MSS of the Old Royal Library in the British Museum: Vol. I, containing the first eight books, comprising the period prior to the Norman Conquest. Camden 1st series. Vol. 36. London: Camden Society.
- Vergil, Polydore (1844). Ellis, Sir Henry (ed.). Three Books of Polydore Vergil's English History, comprising the reigns of Henry VI, Edward IV, and Richard III; from an early translation, preserved among the MSS of the Old Royal Library in the British Museum. Camden 1st series. Vol. 29. London: Camden Society.
- Vergil, Polydore (1950). Hay, Denys (ed.). The Anglica Historia of Polydore Vergil, A.D. 1485–1537. Camden 3rd series. Vol. 74. London: Royal Historical Society. Latin text and English translation.
- Vergil, Polydore (2005). Sutton, Dana J. (ed.). "Anglica Historia". Philological Museum: University of Birmingham. Latin text and English translation
- O'Connor, Stephen, ed. (2021). Polydore Vergil's Life of Richard III: an edition of the original manuscript. Richard III Society. ISBN 9780904893212. Latin text and English translation of a portion of the Anglica Historia, from the manuscript in the Vatican

== Bibliography ==
- Arnold, Jonathan (2014). "'Polydorus Italus': analyzing authority in Polydore Vergil's Anglica Historia". Reformation and Renaissance Review. 16: 122–37. doi:10.1179/1462245914z.00000000053. S2CID 145798698.
- Atkinson, Catherine (2007). Inventing inventors in Renaissance Europe: Polydore Vergil's De inventoribus rerum. Tübingen: Mohr Siebeck.
- Bacchielli, Rolando, ed. (2003). Polidoro Virgili e la cultura umanistica europea (in Italian). Urbino: Accademia Raffaello.
- Carley, James P. (1996). "Polydore Vergil and John Leland on King Arthur: the Battle of the Books". In Kennedy, E.D. (ed.). King Arthur: a casebook. New York: Garland. pp. 185–204.
- Connell, William J. (2004). "Vergil, Polydore [Polidoro Virgili] (c.1470–1555)". Oxford Dictionary of National Biography (online ed.). Oxford University Press. doi:10.1093/ref:odnb/28224. (subscription required)
- Copenhaver, Brian P. (1978). "The historiography of discovery in the Renaissance: the sources and composition of Polydore Vergil's De inventoribus rerum I–III". Journal of the Warburg and Courtauld Institutes. 41: 192–214. doi:10.2307/750867. JSTOR 750867. S2CID 195012177.
- Fulton, John F. (1944). "Polydore Vergil, his chapters on the history of Physick and his Anglica Historia". Bulletin of the History of Medicine. Supplement 3: 65–88.
- Galdieri, L. V. (1993). "Vergil, Polydore". In Richardson, David A. (ed.). Sixteenth-century British Nondramatic Writers: second series. Dictionary of Literary Biography. Vol. 132. Detroit: Gale Research. pp. 316–21.
- Harris, Oliver (2005). "Polydore Vergil's hangings in the quire of Wells Cathedral" (PDF). Somerset Archaeology and Local History. 149: 71–77.
- Hay, Denys (1949). "The life of Polydore Vergil of Urbino". Journal of the Warburg and Courtauld Institutes. 12: 132–151. doi:10.2307/750260. JSTOR 750260. S2CID 195028483.
- Hay, Denys (1952). Polydore Vergil: Renaissance historian and man of letters. Oxford: Clarendon Press.
- Haywood, Eric (2009). "Humanism's priorities and empire's prerogatives: Polydore Vergil's description of Ireland". Proceedings of the Royal Irish Academy. 109C: 195–237. doi:10.3318/priac.2009.109.195. S2CID 191418971.
- Hertel, Ralf (2010). "Nationalising History? Polydore Vergil's Anglica Historia, Shakespeare's Richard III, and the Appropriation of the English Past". In Schaff, Barbara (ed.). Exiles, Emigrés and Intermediaries: Anglo-Italian cultural transactions. Amsterdam: Rodopi. pp. 47–70. ISBN 9789042030688.
- Ruggeri, Romano (1992). Un amico di Erasmo: Polidoro Virgili (in Italian). Urbino: QuattroVenti. ISBN 883920203X.
- Ruggeri, Romano (2000). Polidoro Virgili: un umanista europeo (in Italian). Bergamo: Moretti & Vitali. ISBN 8871861558.
- Whitney, E. A.; Cram, P. P. (1928). "The will of Polydore Vergil". Transactions of the Royal Historical Society. 11: 117–136. doi:10.2307/3678541. JSTOR 3678541.
