= C. W. Dugmore =

British ecclesiastical historian

Clifford William Dugmore (9 May 1909 – 25 October 1990) was a British ecclesiastical historian who contributed to the development of the study of church history in Britain.

== Early life and ecclesiastical career ==
He was the son of a parson and educated at King Edward's School, Birmingham and Exeter College, Oxford, where he studied the Hebrew language. Dugmore was ordained in 1935 and was appointed vicar of Ward End, rural dean of East Birmingham and installed as honorary canon in St Philip's Cathedral, Birmingham. In 1937 Dugmore was assistant curate of Holy Trinity, Formby, in the diocese of Liverpool and sub-warden of St Deiniol's Library, Hawarden. The following year Lord Shrewsbury made Dugmore his private chaplain and gave him the rectory of Ingestre-with-Tixall in the diocese of Lichfield. In 1943 Dugmore was appointed chaplain of Alleyn's College of God's Gift in Dulwich. In January 1945 he was made rector of Bredfield-with-Boulge in Suffolk, and in October he was appointed director of religious education for the diocese of St Edmundsbury and Ipswich.

== Academic career ==
In 1946 Dugmore was appointed senior lecturer in ecclesiastical history at Manchester University and in 1958 he was made chair of ecclesiastical history at King's College London.

He founded The Journal of Ecclesiastical History in 1950 and was its editor until 1979. He also co-founded the Ecclesiastical History Society.

== Personal life ==
Dugmore had a daughter with his first wife, Ruth, who died in 1977. He subsequently remarried.

== Works ==
- Eucharistic Doctrine in England from Hooker to Waterland: Being the Norrisian Prize Essay in the University of Cambridge for the Year 1940 (London: Society for Promoting Christian Knowledge, 1942).
- The Influence of the Synagogue upon the Divine Office (London: Oxford University Press, 1944).
- The Interpretation of the Bible: Edward Alleyn Lectures 1943, edited by C. W. Dugmore (London: Society for Promoting Christian Knowledge, 1946).
- The Mass and the English Reformers (London: Macmillan, 1958).
- Ecclesiastical History No Soft Option: An Inaugural Lecture delivered at King's College, London on 5 February 1959 (London: Society for Promoting Christian Knowledge, 1959).

== Notes ==
Preceded by David Knowles	President of the Ecclesiastical History Society; 1963–1964	Succeeded by S. L. Greenslade
