= Bill Sheils =

British historian

Bill Sheils FRHistS
- Born: William J. Sheils

Academic background
- Education: University of York; King's College, London

Academic work
- Discipline: History
- Institutions: University of York

William J. Sheils FRHistS, known as Bill Sheils, is professor emeritus in history at the University of York and a fellow of the Royal Historical Society. Sheils is a specialist in the early modern religious and social history of Britain.

== Education ==
Sheils was educated at the William Ellis School, North London (1957–64), and earned his BA at York (1964–67), and his PhD at King's College, London.

== Career ==
Sheils first worked on the Victoria County History in Gloucestershire before joining the University of York as an archivist at the Borthwick Institute in 1973 where he worked on the post-medieval collections until 1988. He then taught nineteenth- and twentieth-century social and economic history, and subsequently early modern religious and social history with a specialism in Britain. Sheils retired from teaching in 2011 to become a full-time researcher.

Sheils has written extensively for the Journal of Ecclesiastical History, as well as contributing to the Economic History Review, The Sixteenth Century Journal, and Northern History.

In 2012, Sheils was the recipient of a festschrift, Getting Along? Religious Identities and Confessional Relations in Early Modern England - Essays in Honour of Professor W. J. Sheils (St. Andrews Studies in Reformation History, Ashgate, 2012), edited by Adam Morton and Nadine Lewycky.

His work focuses on the religious and social history of Great Britain and Ireland in the post-Reformation period, with particular emphasis on local context and inter-denominational relations. He has also written extensively on the history of York and Yorkshire since 1500.

He was Provost of Goodricke College from 1983 to 1995, and was Head of Department of History from 2008 to 2011 prior to his retirement.

== Memberships ==
Sheils is a fellow of the Royal Historical Society and a former president of the Ecclesiastical History Society.

He has served as Chair of the editorial board of the Journal of Ecclesiastical History, 2015-2019, and as Chair of Council of The Catholic Record Society 2018-2021

== Personal life ==
Bill is married to Sarah, née Maidlow-Davis, and they have four children; Lucy, Eleanor, Thomas and Richard. Sheils is a parishioner of St Aelred's in the Roman Catholic Diocese of Middlesbrough.

== Selected publications ==
- The Puritans in the Diocese of Peterborough, 1558–1610. Northamptonshire Record Society, 1979. ISBN 0901275409
- The English Reformation 1530–1570. Longman, 1989. (Seminar Studies in History) ISBN 058235398X

Professional and academic associations
Preceded by Robert Swanson	President of the Ecclesiastical History Society; 2008–2009	Succeeded by Andrew Louth
