= W. H. C. Frend =

British ecclesiastical historian and archaeologist (1916–2005)

The Reverend W. H. C. Frend FSA FRSE FRHistS FBA
- Born: William Hugh Clifford Frend; 11 January 1916; Shottermill, England
- Died: 1 August 2005 (aged 89)
- Political party: Liberal
- Spouse: Mary Frend (m. 1951; died 2002)
- Relatives: William Frend (great-great-uncle)

Ecclesiastical career
- Religion: Christianity (Anglican)
- Church: Scottish Episcopal Church; Church of England
- Ordained: 1982 (deacon); 1983 (priest)

Academic background
- Education: Keble College, Oxford (BA, MA, DPhil)

Academic work
- Discipline: History
- Sub-discipline: Ecclesiastical history
- Institutions: University of Cambridge; University of Glasgow
- Influenced: Peter Brown
- Military career
- Service: British Army
- Unit: Queen's Royal Regiment

William Hugh Clifford Frend (11 January 1916 – 1 August 2005) was an English ecclesiastical historian, archaeologist and Anglican priest. He was a specialist in the history and archaeology of early Christianity, particularly religious movements and controversies in the Roman and early Christian worlds.

== Early life and family background ==
Frend was born at Shottermill, Surrey, on 11 January 1916. He was the second son of the Reverend E. G. C. Frend, Vicar of Shottermill, and his wife Edith (née Bacon). He was the youngest by seven years of four children, two sons and two daughters.

His father was an Anglican clergyman of high church persuasion. His mother was the daughter of a general practitioner, and one of her sisters became the first woman to serve as an alderman in Leeds.

A notable earlier member of the family was Frend's great-great-uncle, William Frend (1757–1841), the mathematician, Unitarian, writer and political and social reformer.

Frend became interested in archaeology while still a child. He later recalled spending time at the museum in Haslemere, whose archaeological and historical displays encouraged his interest in the past.

He attended Fernden Preparatory School in Haslemere before entering Haileybury College in 1929. At Haileybury he won an exhibition and later a scholarship. He was already undertaking small-scale archaeological excavation while still at school.

== Academic career ==
- Haileybury College (scholar)
- Keble College, Oxford (scholar, BA first class in modern history 1937, MA 1951, DPhil with thesis on Donatists 1940, DD 1966)
- Craven Scholarship to study in Berlin (with Hans Lietzmann) and North Africa
- Research fellowship at University of Nottingham
- Associate Director, Egypt Exploration Society, Q'asr Ibrim, Nubia 1963–64
- Bye Fellow of Gonville and Caius College, Cambridge (BD 1964)
- Fellow and university lecturer in divinity. During this time Charles III, then reading archaeology and anthropology at Trinity, was one of his students.
- Professor of Ecclesiastical History, and Dean of the Faculty of Divinity, in the University of Glasgow 1969–84 (Emeritus 1984–2005)
- Chairman, Association of University Teachers 1976–78
- Frend once stood for local government as Liberal Party candidate in Cambridge
- In the 1980s he worked at Carthage with a team from the University of Michigan
- In retirement was again elected Bye Fellow of Caius and in his last years wrote a new book about the early life of Augustine

Frend's historical work was notable for bringing archaeological evidence into the study of early Christianity alongside literary, theological, social and economic sources.

His early research concentrated on Christianity in Roman North Africa. The Donatist Church: A Movement of Protest in Roman North Africa examined Donatism in its wider historical and social setting and became an influential contribution to the modern study of the early Church.

His subsequent major works included Martyrdom and Persecution in the Early Church (1965), The Rise of the Monophysite Movement (1972) and The Rise of Christianity (1984). By the 1970s he was internationally recognised as one of the leading historians of the early Christian Church.

Frend continued to combine history and archaeology throughout his career. From 1976 to 1978 he was a member of the University of Michigan team working on the international "Save Carthage" project. His work included collating evidence for the development of Christian churches at ancient Carthage.

== Military career ==
- Assistant Principal, War Office 1940
- Seconded to Cabinet Office and served on Committees for Allied Supplies and the Free French
- Liaison officer, Psychological Warfare Branch, Tunis
- Service in Austria for 18 months
- Italy
- Commissioned officer, Queen's Royal Regiment 1947–67

Frend's wartime career took him to North Africa and continental Europe. His experience and knowledge of Tunisia later contributed to his continuing historical and archaeological interest in Roman North Africa.

== Ministry ==
Frend inclined towards the low church tradition and supported the ordination of women. Alongside his academic career he maintained an active involvement in Anglican church life.

- Reader 1956–82
- Ordained deacon in the Scottish Episcopal Church 1982
- Non stipendiary minister, Aberfoyle 1982–84
- Ordained priest in the Scottish Episcopal Church 1983
- Priest-in-charge, Barnwell with Thurning and Luddington 1984–90
- Permission to officiate in the Diocese of Ely 1990–2005
- Until his death, he continued to take two services every month

Frend had been licensed as a lay reader in the Diocese of Ely in 1956. He was also editor of Modern Churchman from 1963 to 1982.

== Public recognition ==
- Złoty Krzyż Zasługi z Mieczami (Gold Cross of Merit with Swords), Government of the Polish Republic in Exile
- Territorial Efficiency Decoration 1959
- Fellow of the Society of Antiquaries of London 1952
- Fellow of the Royal Historical Society 1954
- President of the Ecclesiastical History Society (1971–72)
- D.D. honoris causa, University of Edinburgh 1974
- Fellow of the Royal Society of Edinburgh 1979
- Fellow of the British Academy 1983
- He set up and financed the Frend Medal, awarded by the Society of Antiquaries for archaeology, history and topography of the early Christian Church. Recipients include Harold McCarter Taylor and Charles Thomas (1981), Philip Rahtz (2003), Günter P. Gehring (2000) Birthe Kjølbye-Biddle (1986), Nancy Gauthier (2002), and Samuel Turner 2004.

Frend also held several international scholarly positions. He was president of the Comité international d'histoire ecclésiastique comparée from 1980 to 1983 and subsequently its honorary president. In 1981 he became vice-president of the Association Internationale d'Études Patristiques.

== Family ==
Frend was the second son of the Reverend E. G. C. Frend, Vicar of Shottermill, and Edith Frend (née Bacon). His father was an Anglican priest of high church persuasion.

His great-great-uncle was William Frend (1757–1841), the mathematician, Unitarian, writer and political and social reformer.

Frend married Mary Grace Crook in 1951. They had one son, Simon, and one daughter, Sally. Mary died in 2002.

== Major works ==
- The Donatist Church: A Movement of Protest in Roman North Africa (1951)
- Martyrdom and Persecution in the Early Church (1965)
- The Rise of the Monophysite Movement (1972)
- The Rise of Christianity (1984)

== Works and publications ==
- The Donatist Church: A Movement of Protest in Roman North Africa, 1951
- Early Church, 1964
- Martyrdom and Persecution in the Early Church, 1965
- Saints & Sinners in the Early Church: Differing & Conflicting Traditions in the First Six Centuries, 1970
- The Rise of the Monophysite Movement, 1972
- Religion, Popular and Unpopular in the Early Christian Centuries, 1976
- Town and Country in the Early Christian Centuries, 1980
- The Rise of Christianity, 1984
- Archaeology and History in the Study of Early Christianity, 1988
- The Archaeology of Early Christianity: A History, 1996
- Orthodoxy, Paganism and Dissent in the Early Christian Centuries, 2002
- From Dogma to History: How Our Understanding of the Early Church Developed, 2003

=== Works co-authored with J. Stevenson ===
- A New Eusebius: Documents Illustrating the History of the Church to AD 337
  J. Stevenson (Editor of the 1957 First Edition), William H. C. Frend (Co-Revisor for the 1987 Second Edition)
- Creeds, Councils and Controversies: Documents Illustrating the History of the Church, AD 337–461
  J. Stevenson (Editor of the 1966 First Edition), William H. C. Frend (Co-Revisor for the 1989 Second Edition)

== See also ==
- List of Professorships at the University of Glasgow
- Trinity College, Glasgow

Academic offices
Preceded by John Foster	Professor of Ecclesiastical History at the University of Glasgow; 1969–1984	Succeeded by Ian Hazlett
Professional and academic associations
Preceded by W. R. Ward	President of the Ecclesiastical History Society; 1971–1972	Succeeded by Geoffrey Nuttall
