= Thomas Langley (priest) =

English clergyman

Thomas Langley was an English clergyman who rose to the position of canon of the 9th prebend of Winchester cathedral, which he held between 1559 and his death in 1581/82. In 1546, he translated parts of the De rerum inventoribus by Polydore Vergil (c. 1470—1555), and in 1552 a treatise on the Sabbath written in Italian by Giulio da Milano (viz. Giuseppe della Rovere [1504—1581]). He also wrote Latin verses in 1559 for William Cunningham’s Cosmographical Glass.

== Life ==
=== Earlier career ===
Thomas Langley’s origins are unknown. In his will, he mentions a brother named Robert, who had children named Christopher, Thomas, and Katherine. That is all we know for certain of the family into which he was born. However, it has been suggested that he was the illegitimate son — one of two? — of the Thomas Langley who was a canon at the Augustinian priory at Leeds, near Maidstone in Kent. The name Langley here is a monastic toponym, equivalent to ‘de Langley’, and there is a village two miles west of Leeds called Langley.

Langley studied at Jesus College, Cambridge, in 1535/1536, and took his BA in 1538. He was perhaps the man who was instituted rector of Headbourne Worthy in Hampshire on 6 April 1541, his patron being queen Katherine Howard (d. 1542). On this occasion, this individual was named William; but in another record he is named as Thomas. In either case, he had been replaced by Thomas Dyricke by 1551. A later incumbent of this living was John Ebden (1516—1614), who held it between 1562 and his death, aged 98, in 1614. Ebden was one of the overseers of Thomas Langley’s will in 1581, and, from 1562, a fellow-canon of Winchester Cathedral. In 1546, Langley translated part of Polydore Virgil’s De rerum inventoribus (see below); and by 1548, he was one of the chaplains who served Thomas Cranmer, archbishop of Canterbury, another former student of Jesus College. On 28 December of this year, Langley and another of Cranmer’s men, John Whitwell, supervised the abjuration by a priest named John Ashton of “divers heresies and damned opinions”, namely, the denial of Christ’s divinity.

On 15 September 1550, Thomas Langley was recorded as rector of Headcorn in Kent. The living was in the gift of the archbishop of Canterbury, in this case, his master Thomas Cranmer. It was from Headcorn, on 21 March 1552, that he dedicated, to his friend William Lewes of London, his translation of a treatise by Giulio da Milano as On the Christian Sabbath. Langley had vacated Headcorn by 19 November 1554, when his place was taken by David Mathos or Mathes (perhaps : Matthews). In the meantime, Langley appears to have moved to another Kent living, for he is recorded as the vicar of Boughton Malherbe on 12 September 1555. His patron was Thomas Cotton (1521—1587) of Boughton Malherbe, who was another of the overseers of Langley’s will in 1581. When he resigned the living here on 3 July 1564, Langley was succeeded by Richard Elson or Elmstone, who, with Ebden and Cotton, was yet another of the overseers to his will. By this time, Langley had been appointed, in 1563, to the rectory of Wanborough, in Wiltshire, but he remained loyal to his old friends in Kent, and they, we trust, to him.

Langley does not seem to have been absent from Boughton Malherbe under queen Mary, despite his convictions. A man of his name appears amongst the exiles at Geneva in 1557, but this Langley was a labourer, not a clerk. A confused rumour put abroad by some of his parishioners in 1561 may shed some light on Langley’s activities during Mary’s reign. He was said to have married a woman and got her with child, but without the banns being called, the woman now being married to another man, still living. Perhaps he had married under Edward VI, and had to put his wife away under Mary.

=== Later career ===
On 8 March 1559, a Thomas Langley was instituted to some position at Slaugham, Sussex, where the patron was Richard Covert (d. 1579) of Slaugham. The incumbent rector was Roger Barrow, so perhaps this Langley was a curate. In any case, our man soon found a good living. On 6 October 1559, Langley was presented by the crown to the canonry of the 9. prebend in Winchester Cathedral; he was installed on 15 October. He kept this prebend until his death in 1581/82. It was a valuable source of income. His friend John Ebden was collated to the canonry of the 10. prebend on 7 December 1562.

On 15 July 1560, Langley took his BD from the University of Oxford; and in 1562, at Winchester Cathedral, he was described as Thomas Langlye MA. By 1563, he had been appointed vicar of Wanborough in Wiltshire. Perhaps he had already been there for some while, for he was employing Roger Smytton as his curate at Boughton Malherbe in 1562, and he resigned his living here in 1564. Thomas Langley lived on quietly at Wanborough until his death. He drew up his will on 21 December 1581, and had died by the time it was proved on 30 January 1581. By then, he was blind, and he sealed rather than signed his testament. His wife Anne was his executor, and his overseers were the three friends from Kent already noted, and also Anthony Hinton of Erlestoke, Wiltshire. He left behind him four children : John, Christopher, Margery, and Eleanor. John was intended for the ministry, and he may be the John Langley BA who was licensed to serve as curate at Headcorn on 20 November 1600.

== Works ==
I The Abridgment

Langley’s first work has the title: ‘An Abridgement of the Notable Work of Polydore Vergil Containing the Devisers and First Finders-Out as well of Arts, Ministries, Feats and Civil Ordinances, as of Rites, Ceremonies Commonly Used in the Church, and the Original Beginning of the Same’. It is taken from the De rerum inventoribus of Polydore Vergil (c. 1470—1555), first printed in 1499. In his dedication, Langley claims to have been motivated to translate Vergil’s De rerum because he thought it would be ‘detestable unkindness’ to have allowed the fame and glory of the inventors to remain unknown to those who could read English but not Latin. The abridgement is nevertheless severe, and only a fraction of the original text survived. His dedicatee was sir Anthony Denny (1501-1549), one of the closer friends and counsellors of Henry VIII (1491—1547). No personal connection is known between the Langley and Denny, and Langley’s dedication may have been motivated only by Denny’s reputation as a ‘favourable supporter of all good learning’ and an enemy to the ‘manifold swarms of popish religions’. Langley hoped that Denny might take note of his own politically correct position and employ him in some ‘more earnest labour’. Richard Grafton printed the book on 16 April 1546, and again on 1 January 1547 (1546 old-style), and in July 1551. John Tisdale brought a fourth edition around 1560. It was thus a relatively popular book, and understandably so, for it is a mine of interesting tit-bits of information.

II Of the Christian Sabbath (1552)

Langley’s other translation is of a ‘godly treatise’ by the Italian reformer Giuseppe della Rovere. known as Giulio da Milano (1504—1581). The seventh of the sermons printed in La prima parte de le prediche del reverendo padre, maestro Giulio da Milano (1541) deals with the Sabbath, but Langley’s text bears no relation to it. This suggests that Langley may have worked from a manuscript which did not see print. The book is dedicated to Langley’s friend William Lewes of London, who was apparently ‘given to the study of the Italian tongue’. Here the emphasis is more on the abuses of the sabbath by Langley’s fellow-countrymen than on the joyful sanctity of the day in Giulio’s treatise.

III Verses in Cunningham’s Glass

William Cunningham published his Cosmographical Glass in 1559. It contained two poems in praise of the author and his work by Thomas Langleius. The second is a mere distich, but the first is more substantial, even if it is mainly a list of some of the topics covered in Cunningham’s description of the heavenly and terrestrial worlds. Langley warns Momus, the arch-detractor, to beware, for Cunningham’s work will endure. Langley refers to himself in the heading of his first poem as ‘Cantabrigiensis’, though his connection with the university of Cambridge seems to have ended around 1540. The title acted as a guarantee of his scholarly credentials. Cunningham studied at Corpus Christi College, Cambridge, in the 1550s; but the other person to provide the Glass with an encomium was an Oxford man : Gilbert Berkeley (1501—1581), bishop of Bath and Wells. There is no obvious connection between Langley and either of these two men.
