= St Andrew's Church, Shotley =

Coordinates: 54.8915°N 1.9310°W

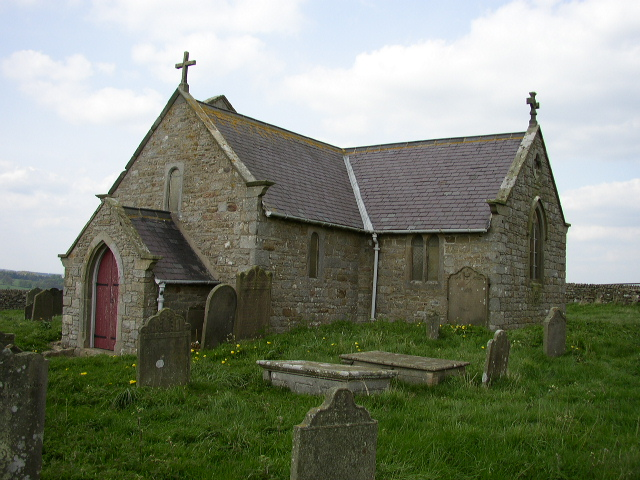
- St Andrew's Church, Shotley, from the southeast

- Location in Northumberland
- OS grid reference: NZ 045 551
- Location: Greymare Hill, Northumberland
- Country: England
- Denomination: Anglican
- Website: Churches Conservation Trust

History
- Dedication: Saint Andrew

Architecture
- Functional status: Redundant
- Heritage designation: Grade II
- Designated: 15 April 1969
- Architectural type: Church
- Groundbreaking: 1769
- Completed: 1892
- Closed: 1971

Specifications
- Materials: Stone, slate roof

St Andrew's Church, Shotley, is a redundant Anglican church standing in an isolated position at a height of 960 feet (293 m) on Greymare Hill in Northumberland, England. It is recorded in the National Heritage List for England as a designated Grade II listed building, and is in the care of the Churches Conservation Trust.

== History ==
The church was built in 1769 to replace an earlier church on the site. It was superseded in 1837 by St John's Church, Snods Edge, Shotley Bridge, several miles to the south. In the 19th century St Andrew's suffered from subsidence due to mine workings, and it was remodelled in 1892. St Andrew's was declared redundant on 29 October 1971, and was vested in the Trust on 13 April 1973.

== Architecture ==
St Andrew's is constructed in coursed rubble with a slate roof. Its plan is cruciform with four equal arms, having a nave and chancel, and north and south transepts. Attached to the south transept is a gabled porch. Above the porch and on the sides of the nave and transepts are single-light round-headed windows. At the west end of the church is a pointed window over which is a plain arched bellcote. In the chancel there are paired lancet windows on the sides, and a two-light east window. Attached to the walls of the church are 18th-century headstones. Inside the chancel are a 19th-century credence table and a piscina. On the walls are memorial tablets. The fittings date from the 19th century and these include a screen across the north transept. In the vestry is a small 18th-century fireplace. There are stone benches in the porch.

== External features ==
In the churchyard, to the northeast of the church, is the Hopper Mausoleum, which is a Grade I listed building. Also in the churchyard are three Grade II listed buildings; these are a hearse house, the Chatt headstone, and the Gibson headstone.

== See also ==
- List of churches preserved by the Churches Conservation Trust in Northern England
