= Andrea Ammonio =

Italian cleric

Andrea Ammonio (c. 1478 – 1517) was an Italian cleric and Neo-Latin poet born in Lucca, held in high esteem by Erasmus, a friend of his. Sent to England by Pope Julius II, he became Latin secretary to Henry VII of England and a prebendary of Salisbury.

Born into one of the oldest families in Lucca (de Herena, also known as "della Rena"), he was later given the hellenized name "Ammonio". At the University of Bologna, he studied under Oliverius Jontus of Montegallorum, a teacher there from 1494 to 1498. Ammonio then went to Rome. By 1506, he was in England, probably travelling with Silvestro Gigli, another Luccanese, who had been sent by Pope Julius II in 1505 to give gifts to Henry VII and who became bishop of Worcester. In 1509, he became Latin secretary to William Blount, Lord Mountjoy, and by 1511, he was secretary to Henry VIII. That year, in Paris, Erasmus showed Blount the manuscript of a book of Ammonio's poems dedicated to Blount, who thought the dedication was too excessive and asked that it be changed. That was done, and Erasmus soon had the book printed.

On February 3, 1512, he received a prebend in the Cathedral of St. Stephen, Westminster, and later received a canonry at Worcester. Also in 1512, he was with the English expeditionary force in France when it won the Battle of the Spurs. On April 12, 1514, he became an English citizen, and in 1515, Pope Leo X appointed him subcollector of papal taxes in England, after Ammonio had conspired against Polydore Vergil for the post. Not yet 40 years old, Ammonio died suddenly in 1517 of the "sweating sickness" in London.

The complete poems of Ammonio were published by Clemente Pizzi in 1958.

== Friend of Erasmus ==
Ammonio met Erasmus when the latter visited England in 1506–1507, and they renewed their friendship from 1509–1511 after Erasmus returned from a trip to Italy. At some point, they stayed together at the home of Thomas More. From 1511 to 1517, they exchanged more than 40 letters on many topics, ranging from the poor wine at Cambridge to international affairs. Ammonio helped Erasmus in his struggles to get papal permission to be free from some of the restrictions of his religious order and to gain financial security. On April 9, 1517, in the presence of Johannes Sixtinus at St. Stephen's in Westminster, and on behalf of Pope Leo X, Ammonio absolved Erasmus of all censures caused by not wearing the habit of his order. On August 19 of that year, Thomas More wrote to Erasmus, informing him of Ammonio's death.
