= Professor of Ecclesiastical History (Glasgow) =

The Chair of Ecclesiastical History of the University of Glasgow is the oldest chair of ecclesiastical history in the United Kingdom.

It was founded in 1716 by King George I of Great Britain. The Crown granted 100 pounds per year for this purpose. This was, thus, a Regius Chair until 1935, when constitutional arrangements in the Church of Scotland resulted in patronage being transferred to the University Court acting on a Board of Nomination consisting of representatives of the University Court and the General Assembly of the Church of Scotland.

== List of professors ==
- William Anderson MA (1721)
- William Rouet MA (1752)
- William Wight MA DD (1778)
- Hugh Macleod MA DD (1809)
- James Seaton Reid MA DD (1841)
- Thomas Thomson Jackson MA DD (1851)
- William Lee MA DD (1874)
- Robert Herbert Story MA DD LLD (1886)
- James Cooper MA DD LittD DCL [1898]
- Archibald Main MA DD DLitt LLD (1922–1942)
- William Dickie Niven MA LLD DD (1946)
- John Foster MA DD (1949)
- William Hugh Clifford Frend TD MA DPhil DD FRSE FBA (1969–1984)
- W. Ian P. Hazlett BA BD DTheo DLitt DD (2002–2010)
- Charlotte Methuen MA BD PhD (2017-)

== See also ==
- List of Professorships at the University of Glasgow
