= Archibald Main =

Scottish ecclesiastical historian

The Very Reverend Archibald Main KHC
- Moderator of the General Assembly
- Church: Church of Scotland
- In office: 1939–1940
- Predecessor: James Black
- Successor: J. R. Forgan
- Other post: Regius Professor of Ecclesiastical History at the University of Glasgow (1922–1942)

Orders
- Ordination: 28 April 1904

Personal details
- Born: 17 December 1876
- Died: 14 March 1947 (aged 70)
- Children: One daughter
- Education: University of Glasgow; Balliol College, Oxford

Archibald Main, KHC (17 December 1876 – 14 March 1947) was a Scottish ecclesiastical historian, Church of Scotland minister, military chaplain, and academic. From 1915 to 1922, he was Professor of Ecclesiastical History at the University of St Andrews. From 1922 to 1942, he was Regius Professor of Ecclesiastical History at the University of Glasgow. He served as Chaplain to the King from 1925 and as Moderator of the General Assembly of the Church of Scotland from 1939 to 1940.

== Early life and education ==
Main was born on 17 December 1876 in Partick, Glasgow, Scotland. He was educated at Garnethill Public School in Glasgow. He then studied philosophy at the University of Glasgow, and graduated with a first-class undergraduate Master of Arts (MA Hons) degree in 1899. Having won the Snell Exhibition, he studied modern history and economics at Balliol College, Oxford, and graduated from the University of Oxford with a Bachelor of Arts (BA) degree in 1903. He won the Stanhope Prize in 1903 for an essay on Sigismund, Holy Roman Emperor. In 1912, he was awarded an honorary Doctor of Letters (DLitt) degree by the University of Glasgow for a thesis titled The Life and Times of Ralph Cudworth.

== Career ==
=== Ordained ministry ===
Main was ordained a minister of the Church of Scotland on 28 April 1904. He then served as Minister of St Madoes Church, Glencarse, in the Presbytery of Perth until 1912. He was called to a different church in April 1912, and served as Minister of Old Kilpatrick Church, Dunbartonshire, until 1915. On 20 October 1938, he was nominated as the next Moderator of the General Assembly of the Church of Scotland. He officially took up the position of Moderator on 23 May, at that start of 1939 General Assembly.

Main was elected Minister of Kirkbean Church in the Presbytery of Dumfries in 1942. He retired from full-time ministry on 13 February 1946 due to ill health.

In May 1925, Main was appointed by King George V as a Chaplain-in-Ordinary to His Majesty in Scotland. He was re-appointed to that position by King Edward VIII (in 1936), and by King George VI (in 1937).

=== Academic career ===
Main acted as an examiner at the University of St Andrews in political economy between 1906 and 1908, and political economy and modern history between 1912 and 1914. On 1 October 1915, he was appointed Professor of Ecclesiastical History at the University of St Andrews. He succeeded John Herkless who had been appointed principal of the university. On 1 October 1922, he was appointed Regius Professor of Ecclesiastical History at the University of Glasgow. He was the Baird Lecturer from 1935 to 1936. He stepped down from that Regius Chair in September 1942.

=== Military service ===
During World War I, Main served as a military chaplain. On 9 July 1917, he was appointed a temporary chaplain and attached to the 2nd Battalion, Fifeshire Volunteer Regiment, Territorial Force. He later transferred to the 7th Volunteer Battalion of the Royal Highlanders, Volunteer Force. On 8 July 1918, he was made a temporary Chaplain to the Forces 4th Class (equivalent in rank to captain) in the Army Chaplains' Department. He then served in the 9th Volunteer Battalion Royal Highlanders until the end of the war.

In July 1919, Main was made an Honorary Chaplain in recognition of his war service. On 31 March 1922, he was appointed a Chaplain to the Forces 4th Class in the Royal Army Chaplains' Department, Territorial Army Reserve. While a professor at the University of Glasgow, he served as chaplain to the Glasgow University Officers' Training Corps; he stood down in 1942 when he left academia.

== Honours ==
For his service in World War I, Main was awarded two campaign medals; the British War Medal and the Victory Medal.

On 30 June 1921, Main was awarded an honorary Doctor of Divinity (DD) degree by his alma mater (the University of Glasgow). In 1943, he was awarded an honorary Doctor of Laws (LLD) degree by the University of Glasgow.

== Styles ==
- 1876–1904; Mr Archibald Main
- 1904–1915; The Reverend Archibald Main
- 1915–1939; The Reverend Professor Archibald Main
- 1939–1940; The Right Reverend Professor Archibald Main
- 1940–1947; The Very Reverend Professor Archibald Main

== Family ==
In 1907 he married Mary Jardine Giffen, daughter of Andrew Giffen of Glasgow. They had one daughter.
