= Charlotte Methuen =

British Anglican priest, historian, and academic

Charlotte Mary Methuen, FRHistS (born 1964) is a British Anglican priest, historian, and academic. Since 2017, she has been Professor of Church History at the University of Glasgow. As an academic she specialises in the Reformation in Germany, 20th-century ecumenism, and women's ministry. She was previously a lecturer at Ruhr University Bochum (University of Bochum), the University of Hamburg, the University of Oxford and Ripon College Cuddesdon. She has served as a priest in the Church of England, Scottish Episcopal Church, and the Old Catholic Church in Germany.

== Early life and education ==
Methuen was born in 1964. She was educated at Queen Elizabeth's Grammar School, a comprehensive school in Ashbourne, Derbyshire. She spent a year studying at Troy State University in Troy, Alabama, United States. Then, from 1982 to 1985, she studied mathematics at the University of Cambridge, graduating with a Bachelor of Arts (BA) degree in 1985: as per tradition, her BA was promoted to a Master of Arts (MA Cantab) degree in 1989. She then worked as a community advice worker in London.

In 1987, she entered Edinburgh Theological College to study theology and train for ordination. She graduated from New College, Edinburgh with a Bachelor of Divinity (BD) degree in 1991 and a Doctor of Philosophy (PhD) degree in 1995. During this time, she also undertook study at Heidelberg University and the University of Tübingen. Her doctoral thesis was titled "Kepler's Tübingen: stimulus to a theological mathematics".

== Academic career and ordained ministry ==
Methuen taught in the Theological Faculty at the University of Hamburg from 1996 to 1997, and Faculty of Protestant Theology at the University of Bochum from 1997 to 2003. She was ordained in the Church of England as a deacon in 1998 and as a priest in 1999. From 1998 to 2001, she served her curacy in the benefice of East Netherlands (covering Arnhem, Nijmegen and Twenthe) in the Diocese of Gibraltar in Europe. She was then a curate in the benefice of Bonn with Cologne from 2001 to 2003. From 2003 to 2005, she was Director of Training for the Diocese of Gibraltar in Europe and honorary assistant chaplain at St Boniface, Bonn and All Saints, Cologne.

In 2005, Methuen returned to the United Kingdom and joined the University of Oxford as a departmental lecturer in ecclesiastical history. She was also canon theologian of Gloucester Cathedral from 2007 and a lecturer in church history and liturgy at Ripon College Cuddesdon, an Anglican theological college, from 2009.

In 2011, she moved to the University of Glasgow where she was appointed a lecturer in church history, theology and religious studies. She was promoted to senior lecturer in 2013, and made Professor Church History in 2017. She has been honorary canon theologian of Ripon Cathedral in the Diocese of Leeds since May 2015, and is also an honorary assistant priest at St Margaret's, Newlands, Glasgow, a parish church in the Scottish Episcopal Church's Diocese of Glasgow and Galloway.

== Selected works ==
- Methuen, Charlotte (2008). Science and theology in the Reformation: studies in theological interpretation and astronomical observation in sixteenth-century Germany. London: T & T Clark. ISBN 978-0567032713.
- Methuen, Charlotte (2011). Luther and Calvin: religious revolutionaries. Oxford: Lion. ISBN 978-0745953403.
- Andrews, Frances; Methuen, Charlotte; Spicer, Andrew, eds. (2016). Doubting Christianity: the church and doubt. Cambridge: Cambridge University Press. ISBN 978-1107180734.
- Ditchfield, Simon; Methuen, Charlotte; Spicer, Andrew, eds. (2017). Translating Christianity. Cambridge: Cambridge University Press. ISBN 978-1108419246.
