= Ecclesiastical History Society =

British learned historical society

- Abbreviation: EHS
- Formation: 1961; 65 years ago
- Founder: C. W. Dugmore; David Knowles; W. H. C. Frend
- Type: Learned society
- Registration no.: 1053883
- Legal status: Charity
- Purpose: Historical Study; Research
- Location: United Kingdom
- Official language: English
- President: Miri Rubin
- Activities: Research; Publications; Conferences
- Website: ecclesiasticalhistorysociety.com

The Ecclesiastical History Society (EHS) is a British learned historical society founded in 1961 to foster interest in, and to advance the study of, all areas of the history of the Christian Church through twice yearly conferences and publications. Founders include C. W. Dugmore of King's College London, Dom David Knowles (the first President), and W. H. C. Frend. Since then the EHS has held annual conferences based on themes suggested by successive Presidents.

There was an Ecclesiastical History Society during the 19th century. The present society's history written by Stella Fletcher is called A Very Agreeable Society. Both historians of nonconformity (including Clyde Binfield, Geoffrey Nuttall, and W. R. Ward) and Catholic historians (including Eamon Duffy and Bill Sheils) have been Presidents of the EHS. The society publishes Studies in Church History which reviews current approaches to ecclesiastical history that have been presented at the summer and winter conferences of the EHS. Membership comes in two categories: members and fellows. The Ecclesiastical History Society is a registered charity.

Fellows of the Ecclesiastical History Society include: Rowan Williams, Isabel Rivers, Janet Nelson, Owen Chadwick, Henry Chadwick, Diarmaid MacCulloch, Geoffrey Nuttall, Walter Ullmann, Alec Vidler, Eamon Duffy, William Frend, and Averil Cameron.

== Presidents ==
- 1961–63 David Knowles
- 1963–64 C. W. Dugmore
- 1964–65 S. L. Greenslade
- 1965–66 E. F. Jacob
- 1966–68 A. G. Dickens
- 1968–69 Christopher N. L. Brooke
- 1969–70 Walter Ullmann
- 1970–71 W. R. Ward
- 1971–72 W. H. C. Frend
- 1972–73 Geoffrey Nuttall
- 1973–74 Rosalind Hill
- 1974–75 Basil Hall
- 1975–76 Donald Nicol
- 1976–77 J. K. Cameron
- 1977–78 John McManners
- 1978–79 Robert Markus
- 1979–80 Denys Hay
- 1980–81 Keith Robbins
- 1981–82 Terence Ranger
- 1982–83 Christopher Holdsworth
- 1983–84 G. R. Elton
- 1984–85 Henry Chadwick
- 1985–86 Patrick Collinson
- 1986–87 Michael Wilks
- 1987–88 J. A. Watt
- 1988–89 Owen Chadwick
- 1989–90 Claire Cross
- 1990–91 Clyde Binfield
- 1991–92 Barrie Dobson
- 1992–93 David Loades
- 1993–94 Janet Nelson
- 1994–96 David M. Thompson
- 1996–97 Anthony Fletcher
- 1997–98 Stuart G. Hall
- 1998–99 Colin Morris
- 1999–2000 Stuart Mews
- 2000–01 Margaret Aston
- 2001–02 Henry Mayr-Harting
- 2002–03 Hugh McLeod
- 2003–04 Brenda Bolton
- 2004–05 Eamon Duffy
- 2005–06 Averil Cameron
- 2006–07 David W. Bebbington
- 2007–08 Robert Swanson
- 2008–09 Bill Sheils
- 2009–10 Andrew Louth
- 2010–11 Sheridan Gilley
- 2011–12 Sarah Foot
- 2012–13 Alexandra Walsham
- 2013–14 John Wolffe
- 2014–15 Frances Andrews
- 2015–16 Simon Ditchfield
- 2016–17 Stewart J. Brown
- 2017–18 Morwenna Ludlow
- 2018–19 Rosamond McKitterick
- 2019–21 Alec Ryrie
- 2021–22 Frances Knight
- 2022–23 Katy Cubitt
- 2023–24 Peter Marshall
- 2024–25 Michael Snape
- 2025–26 Sara Parvis
- 2026–27 Miri Rubin
