= Sara Parvis =

British academic

- Born: Sara Dudley Edwards; Aberdeen, Scotland
- Spouse: Paul Parvis
- Parent(s): Owen Dudley Edwards; Bonnie Dudley Edwards

Academic background
- Education: St Hilda's College, Oxford (BA); University of Edinburgh (PhD)
- Thesis: Marcellus of Ancyra and the Arian controversy: a bishop in context (2002)
- Doctoral advisor: David F. Wright, John Stuart Richardson
- Other advisors: Jane Dawson, Stewart J. Brown, Denis Minns O.P., Maurice Wiles

Academic work
- Institutions: University of Edinburgh

Sara Parvis is a British Patristic scholar and Senior Lecturer in Patristics at the University of Edinburgh. She is known for her works on early Christianity.

Parvis is the current president of the Ecclesiastical History Society.

== Books ==
- Marcellus of Ancyra and the lost years of the Arian controversy, 325–345, Oxford: Oxford University Press, 2006.
- Justin Martyr and His Worlds, with Paul Foster, Minneapolis: Fortress Press, 2007
- Irenaeus: Life, Scripture, Legacy, edited with Paul Foster, Minneapolis: Fortress Press, 2012
