= Morwenna Ludlow =

Professor of theology and religion

The Reverend Professor Morwenna Ludlow
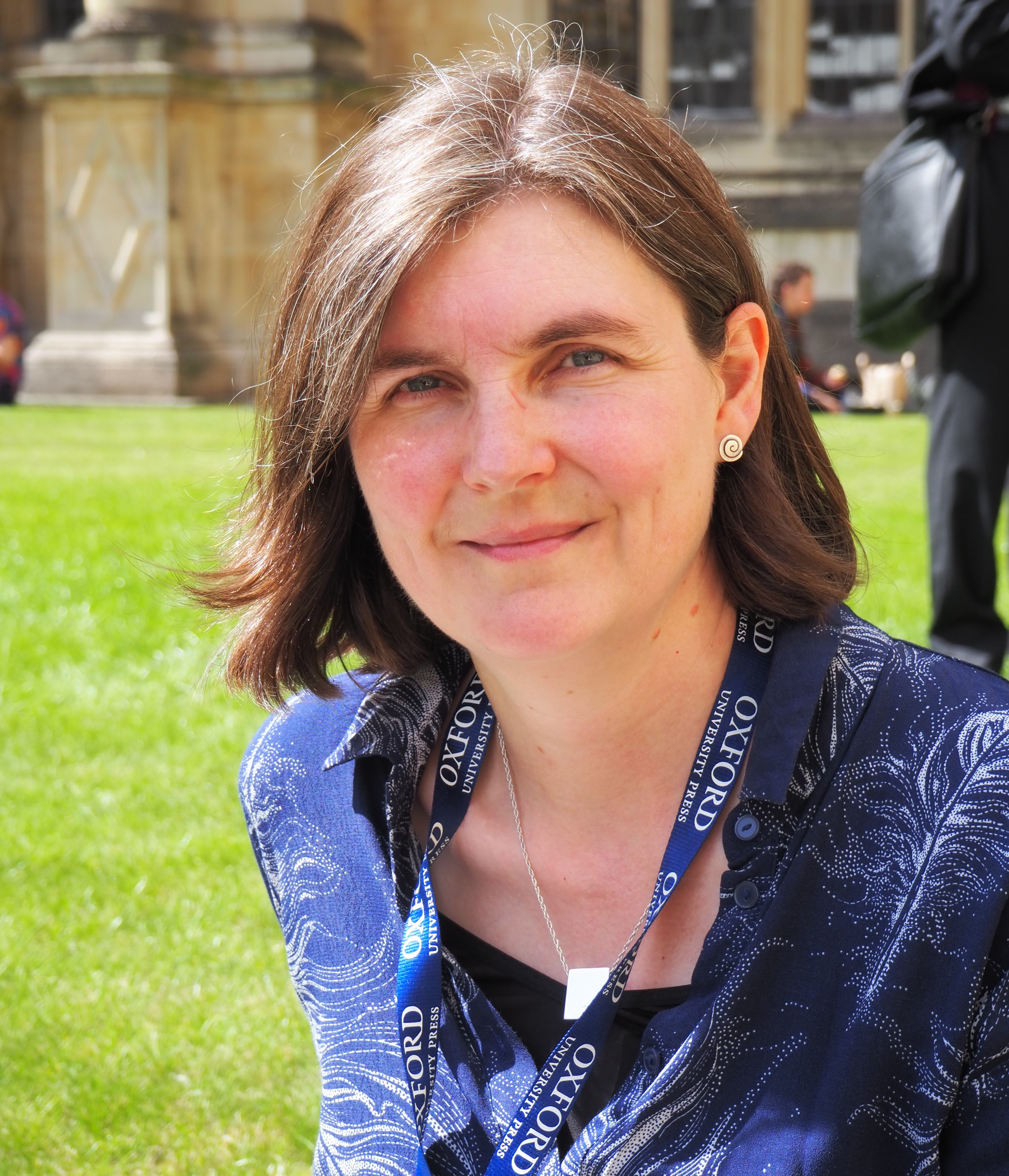
- Ludlow at the Oxford Patristics Conference in 2019
- Born: 1970 (age 55–56)
- Other name: Morwenna Ann Ludlow
- Spouse: Piers Ludlow

Ecclesiastical career
- Church: Church of England
- Ordained: 2015 (deacon); 2016 (priest)
- Offices held: Canon Theologian of Exeter Cathedral (since 2018)

Academic background
- Education: Trinity College, Oxford
- Thesis: Restoration and Consummation (1996)
- Doctoral advisor: Mark Edwards; Keith Ward

Academic work
- Discipline: Theology
- Sub-discipline: Patristics
- Institutions: Wolfson College, Oxford; Gonville and Caius College, Cambridge; University of Exeter
- Main interests: Gregory of Nyssa; universal reconciliation; modern reception of the Church Fathers
- Notable works: Gregory of Nyssa, Ancient and (Post)modern (2013)

Morwenna Ann Ludlow FBA (born 1970) is a British historian, theologian, and Anglican priest, specialising in historical theology. She is Professor of Christian History and Theology at the University of Exeter. She is known in particular for her work on Gregory of Nyssa. Ludlow was made a Fellow of the British Academy in 2026.

== Early life and education ==
Ludlow studied literae humaniores at the University of Oxford and remained there to study for a Doctor of Philosophy degree in theology with a dissertation about universal salvation in Gregory of Nyssa and Karl Rahner. Ludlow began work on her doctorate at Trinity College but moved to Queen's College on receipt of a Holwell Studentship, and moved again to St John's College to take up a junior research fellowship. Her doctoral thesis was titled Restoration and Consummation: The Interpretation of Universalistic Eschatology by Gregory of Nyssa and Karl Rahner.

== Academic career ==
Ludlow worked at Wolfson College, Oxford, and Gonville and Caius College, Cambridge, before moving to the University of Exeter. In 2006 Ludlow was appointed as lecturer in patristics in the Department of Theology and Religion, University of Exeter. She was appointed Professor of Christian History and Theology in 2016. She delivered her inaugural lecture on the 3 November 2016 on The Workshop: Experiments in History and Theology. She was President of the Ecclesiastical History Society (2017–2018).

Ludlow works primarily on patristics, in particular the work of the fourth-century Cappadocian theologian, Gregory of Nyssa. Ludlow uses her research into early Christian thought to examine modern theology by analysing the reception of patristic theology by modern writers. She also works on the history of eschatology in Christianity, with a focus on the idea of universal salvation.

Ludlow is currently working on the aesthetic qualities and doctrinal content of fourth-century Greek Christian texts through a project, Art, Craft and Rhetoric. In this work, Ludlow uses arts and crafts theorists from John Ruskin and William Morris up to the present-day in order to re-examine early Christian texts.

Ludlow appeared on BBC Radio 4's In Our Time on 4 March 2018 to discuss the conversion of Augustine of Hippo to Christianity in a programme with Kate Cooper and Martin Palmer.

== Ordained ministry ==
Ludlow was ordained in the Church of England as a deacon in 2015 and as a priest in 2016. She is a curate at Exeter Cathedral. Since October 2018, she has also served as canon theologian of the cathedral.

== Selected publications ==
- Gregory of Nyssa, Ancient and (Post)modern (Oxford University Press, 2013)
- ed. with Scot Douglass Reading the Church Fathers (Bloomsbury Publishing, 2011)
- Universal Salvation: Eschatology in the Thought of Gregory of Nyssa and Karl Rahner (Clarendon Press, 2000)

Professional and academic associations
| Preceded by Stewart J. Brown | President of the Ecclesiastical History Society; 2017–2018 | Succeeded by Rosamond McKitterick |
