= Katy Cubitt =

Katy (Catherine) Cubitt ^{FRHistS} is Professor Emerita of Medieval History at the University of East Anglia. She is an expert on the early middle ages, especially the Christian Church.

== Education ==
Cubitt studied for a BA in Anglo-Saxon, Norse and Celtic and History at the University of Cambridge. She was a research assistant for the English Place-Name Society, and completed an MA in Germanic Philology at University College London. She was awarded her PhD on Anglo-Saxon Church Councils c. 650-c. 850 from Cambridge.

== Research and career ==
Cubitt joined UEA in 2017 after working at the University of York 1995-2016. Previously, she held posts at the universities of Birmingham, Leeds and University College London.

Cubitt's research spans the early medieval world, from the Mediterranean in the seventh century to England before the Conquest. She was Principal Investigator of the project 'Penance in Late Saxon England' (2008), funded by the AHRC.

Cubitt was President of the Ecclesiastical History Society, 2022-23. She is an Honorary Research Affiliate of the Department of Anglo-Saxon, Norse and Celtic, University of Cambridge, and has held visiting fellowships at the University of Tübingen, Robinson College, Cambridge, and Dumbarton Oaks, Washington DC. In 2024, she gave The Baxandall Lecture at Robinson College, Cambridge.

== Bibliography ==
- (ed. by Catherine Cubitt, Simon Kaner and Susan Whitfield) The Silk Roads, The Historian 161 (2024)
- ‘Narrating providential history: Bede’s account of the conversion of King Edwin of Northumbria in his Historia ecclesiastica’, Early Medieval Europe 33.1 (2025), 26-49
- The Church, Hypocrisy and Dissimulation, ed. Catherine Cubitt, Charlotte Methurn and Andrew Spicer, Studies in Church History 60 (2024)
- ‘Ostriches, spiders’ webs and Antichrist: Hypocrisy in writings of Gregory the Great and Archbishop Wulfstan II of York’, The Church, Hypocrisy and Dissimulation, 64-90
- ‘The impact of the Lateran Council of 649 in Francia: the “martyrdom” of Pope Martin and the Life of St Eligius’, Cites, Saints, and Communities in Early Medieval Europe, ed. S. De Gregorio and P. Kershaw (Turnhout: Brepols, 2020), 71-103
- Anglo-Saxon Church Councils c. 650-c. 850 (Leicester: University of Leicester Press, 1995)

Professional and academic associations
Preceded by Frances Knight	President of the Ecclesiastical History Society; 2022-2023	Succeeded by Peter Marshall
