= Alec Ryrie =

English historian of Protestant Christianity

Alec Ryrie FBA
- Born: Alexander Gray Ryrie; 20 August 1971 (age 55); London, England

Academic background
- Education: Trinity Hall, Cambridge; University of St Andrews; St Cross College, Oxford
- Thesis: English Evangelical Reformers in the Last Years of Henry VIII (2000)
- Doctoral advisor: Diarmaid MacCulloch

Academic work
- Discipline: History
- Sub-discipline: Reformation; History of Christianity
- Institutions: University of Birmingham; Durham University

Alexander Gray Ryrie FBA (born 20 August 1971) is a British historian of Christianity. He has specialized in the history of Protestantism in England and Scotland in the sixteenth and seventeenth centuries but also works extensively on the history of Christianity across the modern period. He was Professor of Divinity at Gresham College from 2018 to 2022. He was elected a Fellow of the British Academy in 2019.

== Biography ==
Ryrie was born in London, and raised in Washington, DC. After teaching for a year at a school in rural Zimbabwe, Ryrie read history as an undergraduate at Trinity Hall, Cambridge (BA 1993, MA 1997), completed a master's in Reformation studies at the University of St Andrews, and in 2000 took a DPhil in theology at St Cross College, Oxford. His doctoral work, examining how early English evangelical reformers operated within the political atmosphere of Henry VIII's reign, was published as The Gospel and Henry VIII. His supervisor was Diarmaid MacCulloch.

Ryrie lives in the Pennines with his wife and their two children, Ben and Adam. He has been a reader in the Church of England since 1997, and is licensed to the parish of Shotley St John in the diocese of Newcastle.

== Career ==
From 1999 to 2006, he taught in the Department of Modern History at the University of Birmingham, and is Professor of the History of Christianity at Durham University, where he has worked since 2007. From 2012 to 2015 he was head of the Department of Theology and Religion. He completed a three-year Leverhulme Major Research Fellowship in 2018.

A Fellow of the Ecclesiastical History Society (President, 2019–21), Ryrie is co-editor of The Journal of Ecclesiastical History and president of the Church of England Record Society. From 2018-22, he was Gresham Professor of Divinity, having been visiting professor in the History of Religion at Gresham College from 2015 to 2017.

Between 2015 and 2022, Ryrie delivered 32 lectures at Gresham College, as visiting professor in the History of Religion and Gresham Professor of Divinity. In 2022, he gave the Bampton Lectures, on "The age of Hitler, and how we can escape it." In 2024 he delivered the Ford Lectures at Oxford University on "The World's Reformation"; in 2026 delivered the Hulsean Lectures at Cambridge University on "A History of Suffering and Power".

== Works ==
- The Age of Hitler and How We Will Survive It (2025)
- The English Reformation: A Very Brief History (2020)
- Unbelievers: An Emotional History of Doubt (2019)
- Protestants: The Faith That Made the Modern World (2017)
- Being Protestant in Reformation Britain (2013)
- The Age of Reformation: The Tudor and Stewart Realms 1485-1603 (2009)
- The Sorcerer's Tale: Faith and Fraud in Tudor England (2008)
- The Origins of the Scottish Reformation (2006)
- The Gospel and Henry VIII: Evangelicals in the Early English Reformation (2003)

Academic offices
Preceded by Alister McGrath	Gresham Professor of Divinity; 2018–2022	Succeeded by Ronald Hutton
Professional and academic associations
Preceded by Rosamond McKitterick	President of the Ecclesiastical History Society; 2019–2021	Succeeded by Frances Knight
