= Alexandra Walsham =

English-Australian academic historian

Professor Alexandra Walsham CBE FRHistS FBA FAHA
- Born: 4 January 1966 (age 60); Hayle, England
- Other name: Alexandra Marie Walsham
- Awards: Wolfson History Prize (2012)

Academic background
- Education: University of Melbourne; Trinity College, Cambridge
- Thesis: Aspects of Providentialism in Early Modern England (1995)
- Doctoral advisor: Patrick Collinson

Academic work
- Discipline: History
- Sub-discipline: Early modern British history; ecclesiastical history
- Institutions: Emmanuel College, Cambridge; University of Exeter; Trinity College, Cambridge

Alexandra Marie Walsham CBE FRHistS FBA FAHA (born 4 January 1966) is an English-Australian academic historian. She specialises in early modern Britain and in the impact of the Protestant and Catholic reformations. Since 2010, she has been Professor of Modern History at the University of Cambridge and is currently a fellow of Emmanuel College, Cambridge. She is co-editor of Past & Present and vice-president of the Royal Historical Society.

== Early life and education ==
Walsham was born on 4 January 1966 in Hayle, Cornwall, and spent her early childhood in England. She and her family emigrated to Australia when she was young. She studied history with English at the University of Melbourne, graduating with a Bachelor of Arts (BA) degree and a Master of Arts (MA) degree. In 1990, she was awarded a Commonwealth Scholarship to study early modern history at the University of Cambridge. She undertook postgraduate research at Trinity College, Cambridge under the supervision of Patrick Collinson, the then Regius Professor of History. In 1995, she completed her Doctor of Philosophy (PhD) degree with a thesis titled Aspects of Providentialism in Early Modern England.

== Academic career ==
Walsham began her academic career as a research fellow at Emmanuel College, Cambridge, between 1993 and 1996. In 1996, she moved to the University of Exeter where she was a lecturer in history. She was promoted to senior lecturer in 2000 and was granted a personal chair (professorship) in Reformation History in 2005. From 2007 to 2010, she served as head of department. In 2010, she returned to the University of Cambridge as Professor of Modern History and was elected a fellow of Trinity College, Cambridge. She later resigned from Trinity in protest at the college's decision to withdraw from the Universities Superannuation Scheme, and joined Emmanuel College.

She is vice president of the Royal Historical Society and chair of its General Purposes Committee. She is one of the series editors of the Cambridge Studies in Early Modern British History, and co-editor of Past & Present, an academic journal specialising in social history.

On 17 October 2013, she appeared on an episode of In Our Time to discuss the Book of Common Prayer. In February 2015, she gave the annual Bishop Van Mildert Lecture at the University of Durham; it was titled "Domesticating the Reformation: Material Culture, Memory and Confessional Identity in Early Modern England". She gave the Neale Lecture at University College London in October 2015. She was elected to give the Ford Lectures at the University of Oxford in 2017/2018. She has been selected to deliver the Gifford Lectures at the University of Edinburgh in 2024/25.

== Honours ==
In 1999, Walsham was elected a Fellow of the Royal Historical Society (FRHistS). In 2009, she was elected a Fellow of the British Academy (FBA). In 2013, she was elected a Fellow of the Australian Academy of the Humanities (FAHA) and was President of the Ecclesiastical History Society (2012–13). She was appointed Commander of the Order of the British Empire (CBE) in the 2017 Birthday Honours for services to history.

In 2000, she was awarded the Longman-History Today Award and the American Historical Association’s Morris D. Forkosch Prize for her monograph Providence in Early Modern England. For her monograph The Reformation of the Landscape, she was awarded the Leo Gershoy Award in 2011 and the Wolfson History Prize in 2012.

== Selected works ==
- Walsham, Alexandra (1993). Church Papists: Catholicism, Conformity, and Confessional Polemic in Early Modern England. Woodbridge, Suffolk, England: Boydell Press. ISBN 978-0861932252.
- Walsham, Alexandra (1999). Providence in Early Modern England. Oxford: Oxford University Press. ISBN 978-0198206552.
- Crick, Julia; Walsham, Alexandra, eds. (2004). The Uses of Script and Print, 1300–1700. Cambridge, England: Cambridge University Press. ISBN 978-0521810630.
- Walsham, Alexandra (2006). Charitable Hatred: Tolerance and Intolerance in England, 1500–1700. Manchester: Manchester University Press. ISBN 978-0719052392.
- Marshall, Peter; Walsham, Alexandra, eds. (2006). Angels in the Early Modern World. Cambridge, England: Cambridge University Press. ISBN 978-0521843324.
- Jones, E. A.; Walsham, Alexandra, eds. (2010). Syon Abbey and Its Books: Reading, Writing and Religion in England, c.1400–1700. Woodbridge, Suffolk, England: Boydell & Brewer. ISBN 978-1843835479.
- Walsham, Alexandra, ed. (2010). Relics and Remains. Oxford: Oxford University Press. ISBN 978-0199600588.
- Walsham, Alexandra (2011). The Reformation of the Landscape: Religion, Identity, and Memory in Early Modern Britain and Ireland. Oxford: Oxford University Press. ISBN 978-0199243556.
- Walsham, Alexandra (2014). Catholic Reformation in Protestant Britain. Aldershot, England: Ashgate Publishing. ISBN 978-0754657231.
- Doran, John; Methuen, Charlotte; Walsham, Alexandra, eds. (2014). Religion and the Household: Papers Read at the 2012 Summer Meeting and the 2013 Winter Meeting of the Ecclesiastical History Society. Ecclesiastical History Society. ISBN 978-0954681029.

Academic offices
Preceded by Stefan Collini	Ford Lecturer; 2017–2018	Succeeded by Mark Bailey
Professional and academic associations
Preceded by Sarah Foot	President of the Ecclesiastical History Society; 2012–2013	Succeeded by John Wolffe
Awards
Preceded by Ruth Harris	Wolfson History Prize; 2012; With: Susie Harries	Succeeded by Susan Brigden
Preceded by Nicholas Thomas	Wolfson History Prize; 2012; With: Susie Harries	Succeeded by Christopher Duggan
