= Studies in Church History =

- Discipline: Ecclesiastical history
- Language: English

Publication details
- History: 1964–present
- Publisher: Cambridge University Press for the Ecclesiastical History Society
- Frequency: Annual

Standard abbreviations
- ISO 4: Stud. Church Hist.

Indexing
- ISSN: 0424-2084 (print); 2059-0644 (web)

Links
- Journal homepage

Studies in Church History is an academic journal published annually by Cambridge University Press on behalf of the Ecclesiastical History Society. It comprises papers and communications delivered at the Ecclesiastical History Society's conferences.
