= Simon Ditchfield =

British academic historian

Simon Ditchfield FRHistS
- Born: Simon Richard Ditchfield

Academic background
- Education: University of York; Warburg Institute, London
- Thesis: Hagiography and Ecclesiastical Historiography in Late Sixteenth- and Early Seventeenth-Century Italy (1991)

Academic work
- Discipline: History
- Sub-discipline: Cultural history; early modern Italian history; history of Christianity
- Institutions: University of York

Simon Richard Ditchfield FRHistS is a British academic historian of early modern Italy. Since 2014, he has been Professor of Early Modern History at the University of York. Since 1 September 2026 he has been emeritus professor.

== Career ==
Ditchfield completed his undergraduate studies at the University of York, graduating with a Bachelor of Arts degree in 1980. He then received Master of Philosophy (1987) and Doctor of Philosophy (PhD) degrees from the Warburg Institute; his PhD was awarded in 1991 for his thesis Hagiography and Ecclesiastical Historiography in Late Sixteenth- and Early Seventeenth-Century Italy: Pietro Maria Campi of Piacenza (1569–1649).

He returned to the University of York in 1991 as a British Academy post-doctoral fellow, and has remained there ever since; after completing his fellowship, he was appointed a temporary lecturer in 1994, and then from 1996 to 1999 he was a project director in the department of the Heritage studies as applied history project; he was then appointed to a full lectureship (1998), and was promoted to a senior lectureship in 2002, a readership in 2006, and to a professorship in 2014.

Ditchfield's research focuses on urban and religious culture in Italy from around 1300 to around 1800. He was president of the Ecclesiastical History Society for the 2015–16 year and is a Fellow of the Royal Historical Society.

== Publications ==
- Liturgy, Sanctity and History in Tridentine Italy: Pietro Maria Campi and the Preservation of the Particular, Cambridge Studies in Italian History and Culture (Cambridge University Press, 1995).
- (Co-editor with John Arnold and Kate Davies), History and Heritage: consuming the past in contemporary culture (Donhead Publishing, 1998)
- (Editor) Christianity and Community in the West: Essays for John Bossy (Ashgate, 2001).
- (Co-author with Anna Benvenuti, Sofia Boesch Gajano, Roberto Rusconi, Francesco Scorza Barcellona and Gabriella Zarri) Storia della Santità nel Cristianesimo Occidentale (Viella, 2005).
- (Co-editor with Kate van Liere and Howard Louthan) Sacred History: Uses of the Christian Past in the Renaissance World (Oxford University Press, 2012).
- (Co-editor with Helen Smith) Conversions: Gender and Religious Change in Early Modern Europe (Manchester University Press, 2017).
- Ditchfield, Simon; Methuen, Charlotte; Spicer, Andrew, eds. (2017). Translating Christianity. Cambridge: Cambridge University Press. ISBN 978-1108419246.
- (Co-editor with Pamela M. Jones and Barbara Wisch), A Companion to Early Modern Rome, 1492-1692, (Brill, 2019)

Professional and academic associations
Preceded by Frances Andrews	President of the Ecclesiastical History Society; 2015–2016	Succeeded by Stewart J. Brown
