= Snods Edge =

Hamlet in Northumberland, England

Coordinates: 54.867°N 1.900°W

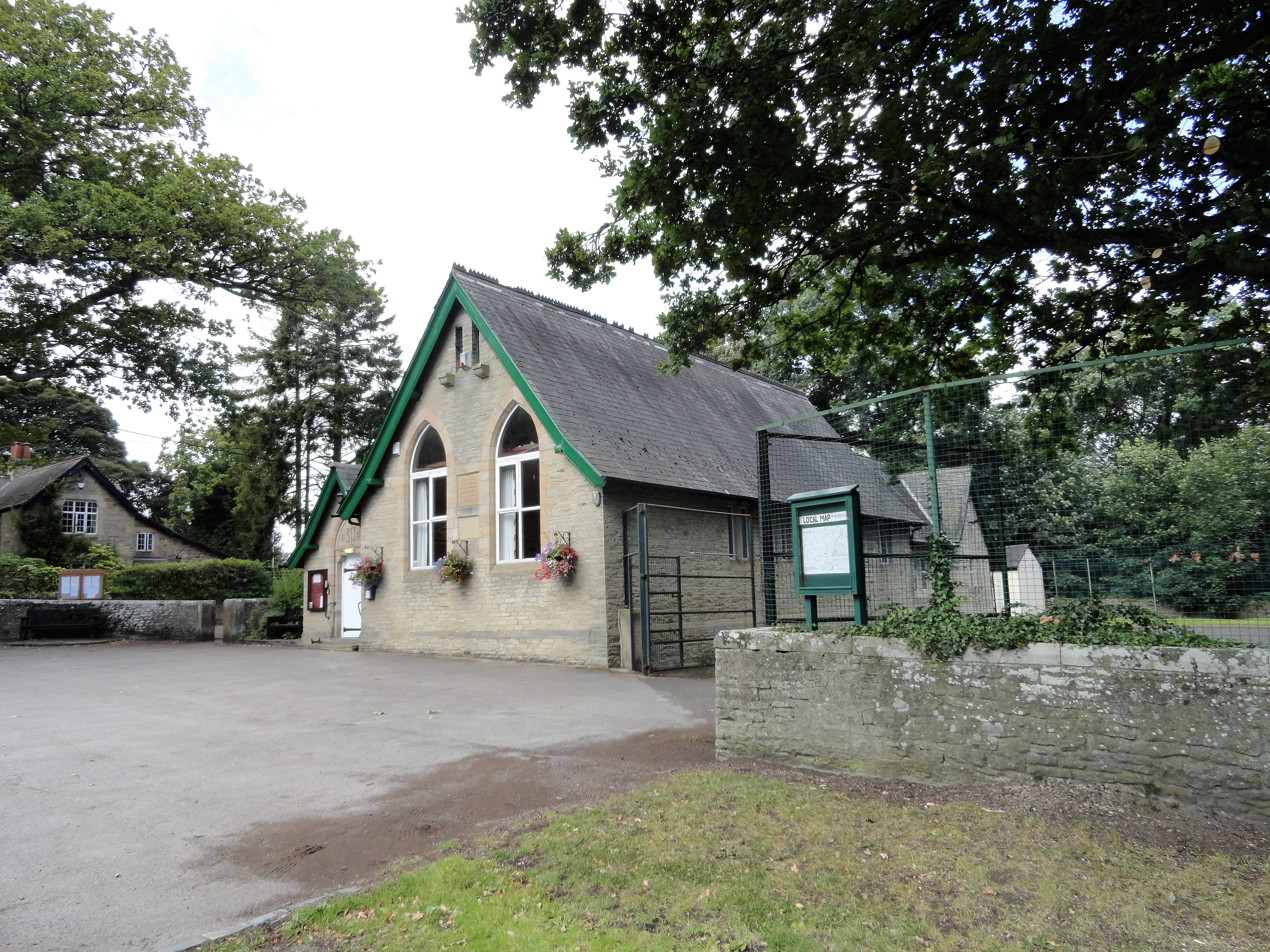
- Community Hall

- Location within Northumberland
- OS grid reference: NZ065525
- Unitary authority: Northumberland
- Ceremonial county: Northumberland
- Region: North East
- Country: England
- Sovereign state: United Kingdom
- Post town: CONSETT
- Postcode district: DH8
- Police: Northumbria
- Fire: Northumberland
- Ambulance: North East
- UK Parliament: Hexham

Snods Edge is a small hamlet in South Northumberland, about 4 miles (6 km) from Consett. The name is thought to have derived from "snow's edge", referring to the hamlet's close proximity (about 5 km or 3 mi) to the North Pennines.

== History ==
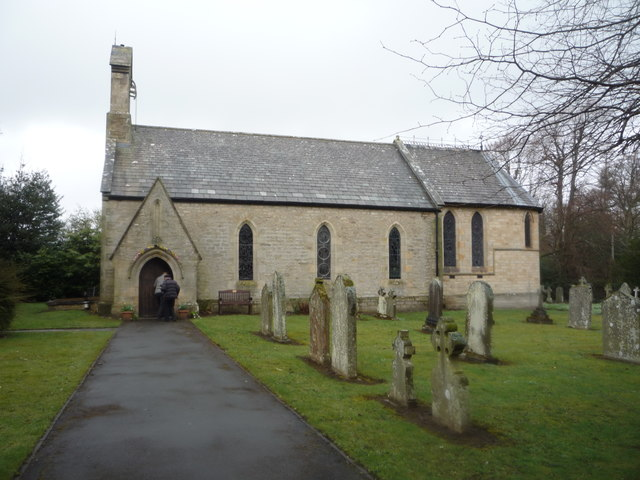
St John's Church

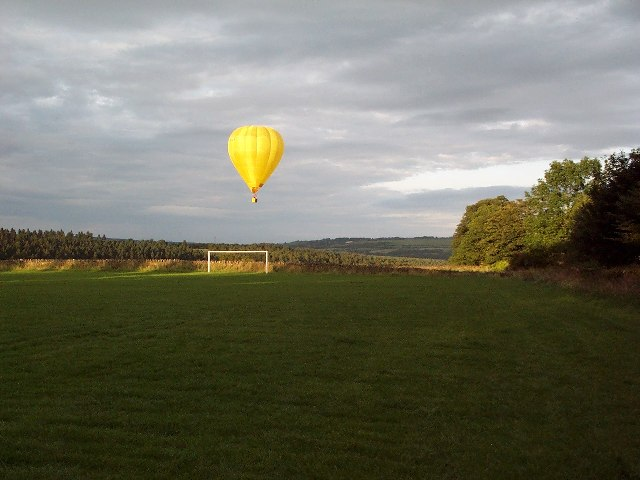
Football field

The hamlet consists of a church dedicated to St John, a church hall, a football field used by the church team "St John's Snods Edge FC, shortend to Snods Edge FC", a vicarage and three houses. The church hall was formerly a school, and won the Northumberland Community Council "Best Village Hall" award three times.

The majority of the buildings date from the 19th century, and the church from 1835 when the centre of the Anglican parish of Shotley Low Quarter was moved from St Andrew's chapel on Kiln Pit Hill to the new site. The parish itself, now known as Shotley St John, is within the deanery of Corbridge in the Diocese of Newcastle.

Snods Edge hosts a number of events each year for the parish, including an art exhibition, which is mainly for local artists to display their paintings. It also hosts a number of other events including a weekly Sunday tea where members of the parish, as well as the local Women's Institute, cook home-made products such as cakes and sandwiches. This usually runs from around March until October; however, in 2011 the first Sunday for teas is 8 May.

There was also once a weekend-long camping event on the sports field during the Easter holiday for the children of the parish, but this has been since been stopped because of waning numbers over the years. This sports field has recently undergone an intensive drainage scheme which will hopefully open up the field for future events.

== Governance ==
Snods Edge is in the parliamentary constituency of Hexham.
