= Sheridan Gilley =

Australian author

- Born: 27 April 1945 (age 80); Brisbane, Australia
- Occupation: Author

Sheridan Gilley (born 27 April 1945) is an Australian author and historian.

== Biography ==
Gilley was born on 27 April 1945 in Brisbane, Australia.

He is the son of Wayne Grover Gilley, a journalist, and his wife Betty Margaret Gilley.

He married Margaret Mary Haworth, a health care executive and vicar, on June 15, 1974, and they have two children.

== Education ==
He completed his bachelor's degree at the University of Queensland in 1966 and his PhD at the University of Cambridge in 1971.

== Career ==
He served as a lecturer in ecclesiastical history at the University of St. Andrews from 1971 to 1978, then moved to the University of Durham. He has been a reader emeritus at the University of Durham since 2002.

== Awards and honours ==
He became a fellow/member of the Royal Historical Society and the Ecclesiastical History Society.

== Bibliography ==
His notable books include:

- Loss and Gain: The Story of a Convert
- The Beauty of Holiness and the Holiness of Beauty: Art, Sanctity, and the Truth of Catholicism
- The Cambridge History of Christianity, Volume 8: World Christianities, c.1815 - c.1914
- Newman And His Age
- The Irish in Britain 1815-1931
- Victorian Churches and Churchmen: Essays Presented to Vincent Alan McClelland
- A Short History of Religion in Britain
