= Stewart J. Brown =

British academic

- Born: 1951 (age 74–75)
- Awards: FRHistS, FRSE

Academic background
- Education: University of Illinois, University of Edinburgh, University of Chicago (PhD)

Academic work
- Institutions: University of Edinburgh, Northwestern University, University of Georgia

Stewart Jay Brown FRSE FRHistS (born 1951) is a British historian and Professor Emeritus of Ecclesiastical History at the University of Edinburgh. He is known for his works on the history of Christianity.

== Career ==
Brown is a former president of the Scottish Church History Society (1998-2001) and the Ecclesiastical History Society (2016–17) and a former co-editor of the Scottish Historical Review.

== Books ==
- Providence and Empire: Religion, Society and Politics in the United Kingdom 1815-1914, Longman/Pearson 2008
- W. T. Stead: Nonconformist and Newspaper Prophet, Oxford University Press 2019

=== Edited ===
- The Oxford Movement: Europe and the Wider World 1830–1930, Cambridge University Press 2012
- Religion, Identity and Conflict in Britain: From the Restoration to the Twentieth Century, Ashgate Publishing 2013
- The Oxford Handbook of the Oxford Movement, Oxford University Press 2017
- The Church and Empire, Cambridge University Press 2018

Professional and academic associations
Preceded by Simon Ditchfield	President of the Ecclesiastical History Society; 2016–2017	Succeeded by Morwenna Ludlow
