= Helen Smith (British literary scholar) =

Scholar of English literature

Helen Smith is a scholar of English literature. She is Professor of Renaissance Literature and Head of the Department of English and Related Literature at the University of York.

== Career ==
Smith completed a Master of Arts degree at the University of Glasgow, before carrying out her doctoral studies at the University of York; her PhD was awarded in 2003 for her thesis "'Grossly material things': women and textual production in England, c. 1550–1650". She taught at the University of St Andrews and at the University of Hertfordshire, and then joined the Department of English and Related Literature at York in 2004. She has since held a senior lectureship, readership and professorship there; as of 2018, she is also head of the department.

Smith's book Grossly Material Things (2012) was awarded the Roland H. Bainton Literature Prize by the Sixteenth Century Society and Conference, and the DeLong Book History Prize by the Society for the History of Authorship, Reading and Publishing.

According to her University of York profile, Smith's research focuses on "Renaissance poetry, drama, and prose; history of the book; feminist literary history and theory; conversion; the Bible; the history of reading; and materiality".

== Selected publications ==
- (Co-editor with Louise Wilson) Renaissance Paratexts (Cambridge University Press, 2011)
- Grossly Material Things: Women and Book Production in Early Modern England (Oxford University Press, 2012).
- (Co-editor with Kevin Killeen and Rachel Judith Willie) The Oxford Handbook of the Bible in Early Modern England (Oxford University Press, 2015).
- (Co-editor with Simon Ditchfield) Conversions: Gender and Religious Change in Early Modern Europe (Manchester University Press, 2017).
