= Institute for the Public Understanding of the Past =

Interdisciplinary research center at University of York

The Institute for the Public Understanding of the Past (IPUP) is an interdisciplinary research centre at the University of York, established in 2006. The institute works as an outward-facing body to create a sustainable network of partnerships between the academic environment and those working in museums and galleries, other heritage practitioners, and media professionals. It also conducts research into the ways in which the past is presented in the media to a mass audience for the purposes of education and entertainment, and into how audiences more generally comprehend and interact with the past. IPUP organises regular conferences and research seminars. It also runs an internship programme for postgraduate students. IPUP is based on the University of York's main Heslington campus, Vanbrugh College, and is hosted by the Department of History.

== Activities ==
The Institute for the Public Understanding of the Past (IPUP) is an interdisciplinary research centre at the University of York, established in 2006. The institute works as an outward-facing body to create a sustainable network of partnerships between the academic environment and those working in museums and galleries, other heritage practitioners, and media professionals. It also conducts research into the ways in which the past is presented in the media to a mass audience for the purposes of education and entertainment, and into how audiences more generally comprehend and interact with the past. IPUP organises regular conferences and research seminars. It also runs an internship programme for postgraduate students.

In 2012 IPUP established a new MA in Public History, which includes two core modules, one optional module and an assessed placement module hosted by external partners. It also hosts a number of PhD students. In 2024, broadcaster and York alumnus Greg Jenner was appointed as a two-year honorary Fellow of the institute.

== Administration ==
IPUP is based on the University of York's main Heslington campus, Vanbrugh College. It is hosted by the Department of History. The founding director, who served from 2006 to 2011, was Professor Helen Weinstein, a specialist in media production. Professor Sarah Rees Jones, a medievalist and specialist in the history of York, was director from 2012 until 2015. From 2015, the director was Dr. Geoff Cubitt, whose research interests are in social memory and in the political, social and cultural aspects of relationships to the past in modern societies more generally. In 2024, the director was previous York City Archivist Victoria Hoyle.
