= Paul Parvis =

British academic

- Spouse: Sara Parvis

Academic background
- Education: University of Oxford (PhD)
- Thesis: Theodoret's Commentary on the Epistles of St. Paul: Historical Setting and Exegetical Practice. (1975)

Academic work
- Institutions: University of Edinburgh

Paul Parvis is a British Patristic scholar and Lecturer in Patristics at the University of Edinburgh. He is known for his works on early Christianity. He was Regent of Studies and head of Blackfriars College up to 1998.

== Books ==
- Honouring Children: The Human Rights of the Child in Christian Perspective, with Kathleen Marshall, Saint Andrew Press 2004
- Justin, Philosopher and Martyr: Apologies, edited by Denis Minns and Paul Parvis, Oxford University Press 2009
