= Emidio Campi =

Swiss historian

Emidio Campi (born 30 September 1943) is a Swiss historian. As a church historian, he is a specialist in the Reformation in Italy and Switzerland, and has researched and published articles on John Calvin, Peter Martyr Vermigli, Huldrych Zwingli, Heinrich Bullinger and other reformers.

== Life ==
He was born on 30 September 1943. He is married with four children.

== Career ==
He attended the University of Tübingen and the University of Zurich. He is currently the Emeritus Professor of Church History at the University of Zurich,. and a director of the Institute for the History of the Swiss Reformation His specialist area of research is the Protestant reformation. Campi retired on 1 August 2009, following which he was undertook various positions as visiting professor in Montreal, Beirut, Buenos Aires, Lincoln (Nebraska), Grand Rapids (Michigan), New York City, Genoa, Modena and Seoul.

== Distinctions ==
He is one of the world's leading scholars of the Church, and particularly the Reformation (along with Peter Opitz and Christian Moser and Herman Selderhuis), and has lectured extensively on the Reformation and those who drove it, for instance, Arnold of Brescia, and Luther. Notably, he has suggested that the sixteenth-century Swiss Reformers Huldrych Zwingli and John Calvin were advocates of a Social market economy; for example, Calvin, Campi says, "would have decisively combated every system that takes social injustice as a given, because in his eyes, social injustice is an offense to the Creator."

== Bibliography ==
His books include:

- Architect of Reformation: An Introduction to Heinrich Bullinger, 1504-1575 (in 257 libraries according to WorldCat )
- Peter Martyr Vermigli: humanism, republicanism, reformation Geneve: Droz, 2002
- Scholarly Knowledge: Textbooks In Early Modern Europe Genève : Droz, 2008.
- Shifting Patterns of Reformed Tradition Göttingen: Vandenhoeck et Ruprecht, 2014.
- A Companion to the Swiss Reformation Leiden : Brill, [2016
- Johannes Calvin Und Die Kulturelle Pragekraft Des Protestantismus
- Heinrich Bullinger, Life - Thought - Influence (editor) Zürich : Theologischer Verlag Zürich, 2007.
