= Henry Alexander Carleton =

British Army general (1814–1900)

General Henry Alexander Carleton CB
- Born: 28 February 1814; London, England
- Died: 22 February 1900 (aged 85); Bath, Somerset
- Military career
- Allegiance: United Kingdom
- Branch: British Army
- Service years: 1830–1881
- Rank: General
- Conflicts: Capture of Lucknow
- Awards: Companion of the Order of the Bath

Henry Alexander Carleton (28 February 1814 – 22 February 1900) was a British Army general in British India.

== Military career ==
Carleton was born in 1814, the son of Francis Carleton. He entered the Bengal Artillery in 1830. He served in the Indian Rebellion of 1857, where he commanded the artillery division siege train at the siege and capture of Lucknow, and the artillery in the action at Nawabgunge. He was twice mentioned in despatches, received the brevet rank of lieutenant-colonel, and was appointed a Companion of the Order of the Bath (CB). He became Colonel commandant in the Royal Artillery, received the rank of general in July 1879, and retired from the army in 1881.

In 1855 he married Elizabeth Boyle, daughter of Armor Boyle, Dundrum, County Down. She died in 1878.

Carleton died at Bath, Somerset, on 22 February 1900.
