= Geoffrey Nuttall =

British historian

Geoffrey Fillingham Nuttall FBA FKC (8 November 1911 – 24 July 2007) was a British Congregational minister and ecclesiastical historian.

Nuttall was born in Colwyn Bay, North Wales, the son of the general practitioner. He was educated at Bootham School, the Quaker school in York, and read Mods and Greats at Balliol College, Oxford, and then Theology at Mansfield College, Oxford. He was a student pastor at Benson, Oxfordshire, and studied at Marburg from 1936 to 1937 under the direction of Theodor Sippell.

He emulated his grandfathers, both of whom were Congregational ministers, when he was ordained into the Congregational ministry in 1938 at Warminster. He was the minister at Common Close Congregational Church in Warminster from 1938 to 1943, then moved into theological training, first at the Quaker study centre at Woodbrooke College in the Selly Oak Colleges, Birmingham. In 1945, he became only the second nonconformist theologian to become Doctor of Divinity at Oxford University. That year, he became a lecturer in church history at New College London, where he remained until his retirement in 1977. He was the chairman of the Board of Studies in Theology from 1957 to 1959, Dean of the Faculty of Theology from 1960 to 1964, and New College Librarian from 1958 to 1977. He was also a trustee of Dr Williams's Library from 1947.

He was a founder member of the Ecclesiastical History Society, and was its president in 1972, the first person to serve in that position who was not a professor. He was also president of the historical societies of the Society of Friends, the Congregationalists and United Reformed Church. He helped to write A Congregational Declaration of Faith in the early 1960s.

His general area of academic interest was 17th-century ecclesiastical history, with a special interest in Richard Baxter and Philip Doddridge. Until his death, he was consulted for his expert opinion on matters of ecclesiastical history.

He was a noted lecturer and contributed articles to learned journals, the Oxford Dictionary of National Biography and the Encyclopædia Britannica. He was the author of several books on the church and religious subjects generally. His most celebrated publications were probably The Holy Spirit in Puritan Faith and Experience (1946; reprinted by Chicago University Press, 1992, without his permission, ISBN 0-226-60941-3), based on his Oxford doctoral thesis, in which he argued that Quakerism was a logical development of Puritanism, and Visible Saints: The Congregational Way 1640-1660 (Oxford: Blackwell, 1957, 2nd edition with additional material Weston Rhyn: Quinta Press, 2001, ISBN 1-897856-12-1). He also wrote books on Richard Baxter, Philip Doddridge and Howell Harris. He gave the Hibbert Lecture in 1964, on The Beginnings of Nonconformity, and the Ethel Wood Lecture in 1978, entitled The Moment of Recognition: Luke as Storyteller. He also gave the F.D. Maurice Lectures at King's College London and the Charles Gore Lectures in Westminster Abbey. He also studied Erasmus and Dante, publishing The Faith of Dante Alighieri in 1969.

A festschrift was published on his retirement in 1977, Reformation, Conformity and Dissent: Essays in Honour of Geoffrey Nuttall edited by Buick Knox (London: Epworth Press, 1977, ISBN 0-7162-0288-3). This contains a bibliography of his writings up to 1977. A further bibliography from 1977 was published in the Journal of the URC Historical Society.

Two collections of his essays and articles have been published in recent years, Studies in English Dissent (Weston Rhyn: Quinta Press, 2003, ISBN 1-897856-14-8) and Early Quaker Studies and The Divine Presence (Weston Rhyn: Quinta Press, 2003, ISBN 1-897856-22-9).

After his retirement, he was a visiting professor at King's College London from 1977 to 1980, and was appointed a Fellow of King's College London in 1977. He became an honorary Doctor of Divinity at the University of Wales in 1969, and became a vice-president of the Honourable Society of Cymmrodorion in 1978. He became a Fellow of the British Academy in 1991.

He married Mary Powley (née Preston) in 1944, having met while he was at Woodbrooke, where she was Secretary. She was the widow of GP Powley, and died in 1982. He suffered a stroke in 2000, and passed his final years in a nursing home near Bromsgrove, in Worcestershire, where he died. His funeral took place at Lodge Hill Crematorium, Selly Oak, Birmingham on 8 August 2007 and was followed by a Thanksgiving Service at Bournville United Reformed Church, Beaumont Road, where he was a member up to his death.
