= Denys Hay =

British historian

Denys Hay FRSE FBA (29 August 1915 – 14 June 1994) was a British historian specialising in medieval and Renaissance Europe, and notable for demonstrating the influence of Italy on events in the rest of the continent.

== Life ==
He was born in Newcastle-upon-Tyne on 29 August 1915, the son of Rev W. K. Hay and his wife, Janet Waugh. He was educated at the Newcastle Royal Grammar School then won a place at Oxford University.

During the Second World War he served from 1940 in the RASC, and was then seconded to the Cabinet Office as one of the team of war historians set up at the instigation of Winston Churchill. With MM Postan and JD Scott, he contributed to the volume The Design and Development of Weapons (HMSO 1964).

He lectured in Modern History at the University of Edinburgh from 1946 until 1954, then becoming Professor of Medieval and Renaissance History until he retired in 1980. He was also Vice-Principal of the university from 1971–75. He is remembered with the Denys Hay Seminar there. On retirement, he was visiting professor at the University of Virginia, and then Professor of History at the European University Institute in Florence. He was Editor of the English Historical Review from 1959 to 1967, President of the Historical Association from 1967 to 1970, and President of the Ecclesiastical History Society from 1979 to 1980.

He was the general editor for the Longman History of Italy, as well as for A General History of Europe, also published by Longman.

He died in Edinburgh on 14 June 1994.

== Family ==
In 1937, he married Sarah Gwyneth Morley. They had one son and two daughters.

== Books ==
- The Anglica historia of Polydore Vergil, AD 1485-1537, editor (1950)
- Polydore Vergil: Renaissance Historian and Man of Letters (Clarendon Press, 1952)
- From Roman Empire to Renaissance Europe (1953); revised as The Medieval Centuries (1964)
- Europe: The Emergence of an Idea (Edinburgh University Press, 1957)
- New Cambridge Modern History, volume 1, editor (1957)
- The Italian Renaissance in its Historical Background (1961; 1977)
- Europe in the Fourteenth and Fifteenth Centuries (A General History of Europe, Longman, 1966; 2nd ed 1989) ISBN 0-582-49179-7
- The Age of the Renaissance, editor (Thames & Hudson, 1967; 2nd ed 1986)
- Italian Clergy and Italian Culture in the Fifteenth Century (1973)
- Annalists and Historians: Western Historiography from the Eighth to the Eighteenth Centuries (1977)
- Renaissance Essays (1988)
- Italy in the Age of the Renaissance, 1380-1530 (Longman History of Italy, Longman, 1989) ISBN 0-582-48359-X
