= The Journal of Ecclesiastical History =

Quarterly peer-reviewed academic journal

- Discipline: Ecclesiastical history
- Language: English
- Edited by: Alec Ryrie; James Carleton Paget

Publication details
- History: 1950–present
- Publisher: Cambridge University Press
- Frequency: Quarterly

Standard abbreviations
- ISO 4: J. Eccles. Hist.

Indexing
- ISSN: 0022-0469 (print); 1469-7637 (web)
- LCCN: 58020553
- OCLC no.: 01604275

Links
- Journal homepage; Online access; Online archive

The Journal of Ecclesiastical History is a quarterly peer-reviewed academic journal published by Cambridge University Press. It was established in 1950 and covers all aspects of the history of the Christian Church. It deals with the church both as an institution and in its relations with other religions and society at large. The journal publishes articles and book reviews.

The current editors-in-chief are Alec Ryrie (Durham University) and James Carleton Paget (University of Cambridge). The journal is regarded as highly authoritative in its field, and is compared to the American Church History.
