= Reformation (journal) =

- Discipline: Protestant Reformation, Religious studies
- Language: English
- Edited by: Mark Rankin

Publication details
- History: 1996-present
- Publisher: Taylor & Francis
- Frequency: Biannual

Standard abbreviations
- ISO 4: Reformation

Indexing
- ISSN: 1357-4175 (print); 1752-0738 (web)
- OCLC no.: 35329781

Links
- Journal homepage; Online access; Online archive

Reformation is a peer-reviewed academic journal sponsored by the Tyndale Society, publishing "original research in scholarship of the Reformation era". Founded by D.J. Daniell in 1996, the journal is published biannually by Taylor & Francis on behalf of the Tyndale Society.

The current editor is Mark Rankin, Professor of English at James Madison University.

== The Tyndale Society ==
The Tyndale Society was inaugurated in 1995, one year before the first issue of Reformation was published. The aims of the Society are "to promote a greater knowledge and understanding of the importance of the contribution made by William Tyndale to the English Reformation by his Biblical translations and theological writings, and to encourage relevant research and study". The Society pursues these purposes mainly through publications and events.
