= Matthew Davies (historian) =

British academic

Matthew P. Davies FRHistS FSA is a British academic administrator and urban historian, specialising in late medieval and early modern cities. Since 2026 he has been Pro-Vice Chancellor for Civic Engagement at Birkbeck, University of London where he is also a professor of urban history. Between 2002 and 2016, he was Director of the Institute of Historical Research's Centre for Metropolitan History, and Pro-Dean of the School of Advanced Study in the University of London.

== Career ==
Davies completed his undergraduate studies (BA) and doctorate at the University of Oxford; his DPhil was awarded in 1994 for his thesis "The tailors of London and their guild, c. 1300–1500". He worked for the History of Parliament Trust as a researcher and completed studies of parliamentary representation in 15th-century London and Southwark, before being appointed Director of the Centre for Metropolitan History at the University of London's Institute of Historical Research in 2002. He remained in that post until 2016, when he was appointed Executive Dean of the School of Social Sciences, History and Philosophy at Birkbeck, University of London (replacing Professor Miriam Zukas who retired after seven years in the role); he is also a professor of urban history in the School. He became Executive Dean of the Faculty of Humanities and Social Sciences after its creation in 2023, and was then appointed as Pro-Vice Chancellor for Civic Engagement in 2026. Prior to his appointment at Birkbeck, he had also been Pro-Dean at the School of Advanced Study where he was also Professor of Urban History. Since 2016 he has been the director of Layers of London, a digital mapping and public engagement project, based at the Institute of Historical Research, which was funded until September 2020 by the National Lottery Heritage Fund, the Stavros Niarchos Foundation, and the Anita McConnell bequest through the Friends of the IHR.

=== Honours, awards and other appointments ===
As of 2018, Davies is a Fellow of the Royal Historical Society, Fellow of the Society of Antiquaries of London (elected in 2017), and also serves as a Trustee of the London Journal Trust, a council member/Trustee of the British Record Society and a trustee of the Historic Towns Atlas Trust.

== Selected publications ==
- (Edited with Vanessa Harding, Catherine Ferguson, Elizabeth Parkinson, John Price, Andrew Wareham and Cliff Webb) The London and Middlesex Hearth Tax of 1666, British Records Society Hearth Tax Series, no. 9 (2014).
- (Edited with James A. Galloway) London and Beyond: Essays in Honour of Derek Keene (Institute of Historical Research, 2012).
- "'Monuments of Honour': Clerks, Histories and Heroes in the London livery companies", in Hannes Kleineke (ed.), Fifteenth Century X: Parliament, Personalities and Power. Papers Presented to Linda S. Clark (Boydell Press, 2011), pp. 145–165.
- (Edited with Andrew Prescott) London and the Kingdom: Essays in Honour of Caroline M. Barron, Harlaxton Medieval Studies, no. 16 (Shaun Tyas, 2008).
- (Authored with Vanessa Harding, Philip Baker, Mark Merry, Olwen Myhill, Gill Newton and Richard Smith) People in Place: Families, Households and Housing in Early Modern London (Centre for Metropolitan History, 2008)
- (Edited with Caroline M. Barron) The Religious Houses of London and Middlesex (Institute of Historical Research, 2007).
- (Authored with Ann Saunders) The History of the Merchant Taylors' Company (Maney, 2004).
- "Lobbying Parliament: the London livery companies in the fifteenth century", Parliamentary History, vol. 23 (2004), pp. 136–148.
- (Authored with Caroline M. Barron) "Ellen Langwith, silkwoman of London", The Ricardian, vol. 13 (2003), pp. 39–47.
- "Governors and Governed: the Practice of Power in the Merchant Taylors' Company", in I. A. Gadd and P. Wallis (eds.), Guilds, Society and Economy in London, 1450–1800 (Centre for Metropolitan History, 2002), pp. 67–83.
- The Merchant Taylors' Company of London: Court Minutes 1486–1493 (Paul Watkins, 2000).
- "Artisans, Guilds and Government in London" in R. H. Britnell (ed.), Daily Life in the Late Middle Ages (Sutton, 1998), pp. 125–150.
- "The Tailors of London: Corporate Charity in the Late-Medieval Town" in Rowena E. Archer (ed.), Crown, Government and People in the Fifteenth Century (Sutton, 1995), pp. 161–190.
- "Dame Thomasine Percyvale, 'the Maid of Week' (d. 1512)", in Caroline M. Barron and Anne F. Sutton (eds.), Medieval London Widows 1300–1500 (Hambledon Press, 1994), pp. 185–208.

Since 2016, Davies has been director of a Heritage-Lottery-funded project, "The Layers of London: mapping the city's heritage", based at the Institute of Historical Research. From 2010 to 2016, he was director of the "Records of London's Livery Companies Online" project, and with Vanessa Harding and Richard Smith, he received a Major Grant from Economic and Social Research Council for a project entitled "Life in the Suburbs: Health, Domesticity and Status in Early Modern London", which ran from 2008 to 2011.

Academic offices
Preceded by Derek Keene	Director, Centre for Metropolitan History (2002–2016)	Succeeded by Mark Merry (acting)
Preceded by Miriam Zukas	Executive Dean, School of Social Sciences, History and Philosophy, Birkbeck, University of London (Since 2016)	Succeeded by Incumbent
