= Ian Archer =

British historian

Ian Archer FRHistS
- Born: Ian Wallace Archer; 1960 (age 65–66)
- Occupations: Historian and academic

Academic background
- Education: Altrincham Grammar School for Boys
- Alma mater: Trinity College, Oxford
- Thesis: Governors and governed in late sixteenth-century London, c.1560-1603: Studies in the achievement of stability (1988)
- Doctoral advisor: Penry Williams

Academic work
- Discipline: History
- Sub-discipline: Early modern Britain; History of London; Social history; Political history; English Reformation
- Institutions: Girton College, Cambridge; Downing College, Cambridge; Keble College, Oxford

Ian Wallace Archer FRHistS (born 1960) is a historian of early modern London and the Robert Stonehouse Tutorial Fellow in History at Keble College, University of Oxford.

== Career ==
After graduating from Altrincham Grammar School for Boys and Trinity College, Oxford, Archer started his academic career in 1986 as a research fellow at Girton College, University of Cambridge. In 1989 he moved to Downing College, Cambridge where he was director of studies in history until 1991. After leaving Cambridge he transferred to Keble College, Oxford.

In 1991 Archer published his first monograph, The Pursuit of Stability: Social Relations in Elizabethan London, based on his DPhil thesis which was supervised by Penry Williams.

From 1999 to 2010 Archer was academic editor of the Bibliography of British and Irish History. He is an honorary vice-president of the Royal Historical Society. Archer served as Sub-Warden of Keble College from 2008 to 2013; in 2009 he was the college's Acting Warden while Averil Cameron was on research leave and presided over the election of her successor, Jonathan Phillips.

== Philanthropy ==
He is the chair of the education committee at the London Academy of Excellence, Stratford, an Ofsted outstanding Free School.

== Publications ==
=== Books ===
- Hugh Alley's Caveat: The Markets of London in 1598 (London: London Topographical Society, 1988) (co-edited with Caroline Barron and Vanessa Harding)
- The Pursuit of Stability: Social Relations in Elizabethan London (Cambridge: Cambridge University Press, 1991)
- The History of the Haberdashers' Company (Chichester: Phillimore, 1991)
- Religion, Politics, and Society in Sixteenth-Century England (Cambridge: Cambridge University Press for the Royal Historical Society, 2003)
- English Historical Documents Volume V: c.1558-1603 (London: Routledge, 2011) (co-edited with F. Douglas Price)
- The Oxford Handbook of Holinshed's Chronicles (Oxford: Oxford University Press, 2013) (co-edited with Felicity Heal and Paulina Kewes)

=== Articles ===
- 'The Government of London, 1500-1650', The London Journal 26:1 (2001), pp. 19–28
- 'The Burden of Taxation on Sixteenth-Century London', The Historical Journal 44:3 (2001), pp. 599–627
- 'The Charity of Early Modern Londoners', Transactions of the Royal Historical Society 12 (2002), pp. 223–244
- 'A 'Journall' of Matters of State', Camden Society Fifth Series 22 (2003), pp. 35–136 (co-edited with Simon Adams and G. W. Bernard)
- 'Discourses of History in Elizabethan and Early Stuart London', Huntington Library Quarterly 68:1-2 (2005), pp. 205–26
- 'City and Court Connected: The Material Dimensions of Royal Ceremonial, ca. 1480-1625', Huntington Library Quarterly 71:1 (2008), pp. 157–179
- '150 Years of Royal Historical Society Publishing', Transactions of the Royal Historical Society 28 (2018), pp. 265–288

=== Chapters ===
- 'Patronage and Clientage in Elizabethan London', in Charles Giry-Deloison and Roger Mettam, eds., Patronages et clientélismes 1550-1750 (France, Angleterre, Espagne, Italie) (Lille: Publications de l'Institute de recherches historiques du Septentrion, 1995), pp. 137–148
- 'The Nostalgia of John Stow', in David Bevington, David L. Smith and Richard Strier, eds., The Theatrical City: Culture, Theatre and Politics in London, 1576-1649 (Cambridge: Cambridge University Press, 1995)
- 'Material Londoners?', in Lena Cowen Orlin, ed., Material London, ca. 1600 (Philadelphia: University of Pennsylvania Press, 2000), pp. 174–192
- 'The Arts and Acts of Memorialization in Early Modern London 1598-1720', in J. F. Merritt, ed., Imagining Early Modern London: Perceptions and Portrayals of the City from Stow to Strype (Cambridge: Cambridge University Press, 2001) pp. 89–113
- 'John Stow, Citizen and Historian', in John Stow (1525-1605) and the Making of the English Past: Studies in Early Modern Culture and the History of the Book (London, 2004), pp. 13–26
- 'London and Westminster', in Thomas Warren Hopper and Arthur F. Kinney, eds., A New Companion to Renaissance Drama (Oxford: Blackwell Publishers, 2004), pp. 75–87
- 'The City of London and the Theatre', in Richard Dutton, ed., The Oxford Handbook of Early Modern Theatre (Oxford: Oxford University Press, 2011), pp. 396–412
- 'Economy', in Arthur F. Kinney, ed., The Oxford Handbook of Shakespeare (Oxford: Oxford University Press, 2011), pp. 165–181
- 'The City of London and the Ulster Plantation', in Éamonn Ó Ciardha and Micheál Ó Siochrú, eds., The Plantation of Ulster: Ideology and Practice (Manchester: Manchester University Press, 2012), pp. 78–97
- 'Shakespeare's London', in David Scott Kastan, ed., A Companion to Shakespeare (Oxford: Blackwell Publishers, 2012), pp. 43–56
- 'Commerce and Consumption', in Susan Doran and Norman Jones, eds., The Elizabethan World (London: Routledge, 2014), pp. 411–426
- 'Elizabethan Chroniclers and Parliament', in Paul Cavill and Alexandra Gajda, eds., Writing the History of Parliament in Tudor and Early Stuart England (Manchester: Manchester University Press, 2018), pp. 133–152
- 'Royal Entries, the City of London, and the Politics of Stuart Successions', in Paulina Kewes and Andrew McRae, eds., Stuart Succession Literature: Moments and Transformations (Oxford: Oxford University Press, 2018), pp. 257–281
- 'The Social and Political Dynamics of the Lord Mayor's Show, c.1550-1700', in J. Caitlin Finlayson and Amrita Sen, eds., Civic Performance: Pageantry and Entertainments in Early Modern London (London: Routledge, 2020), pp. 93–115
