= Paulina Kewes =

Polish historian and academic (born 1964)

Professor Paulina Kewes FRHistS
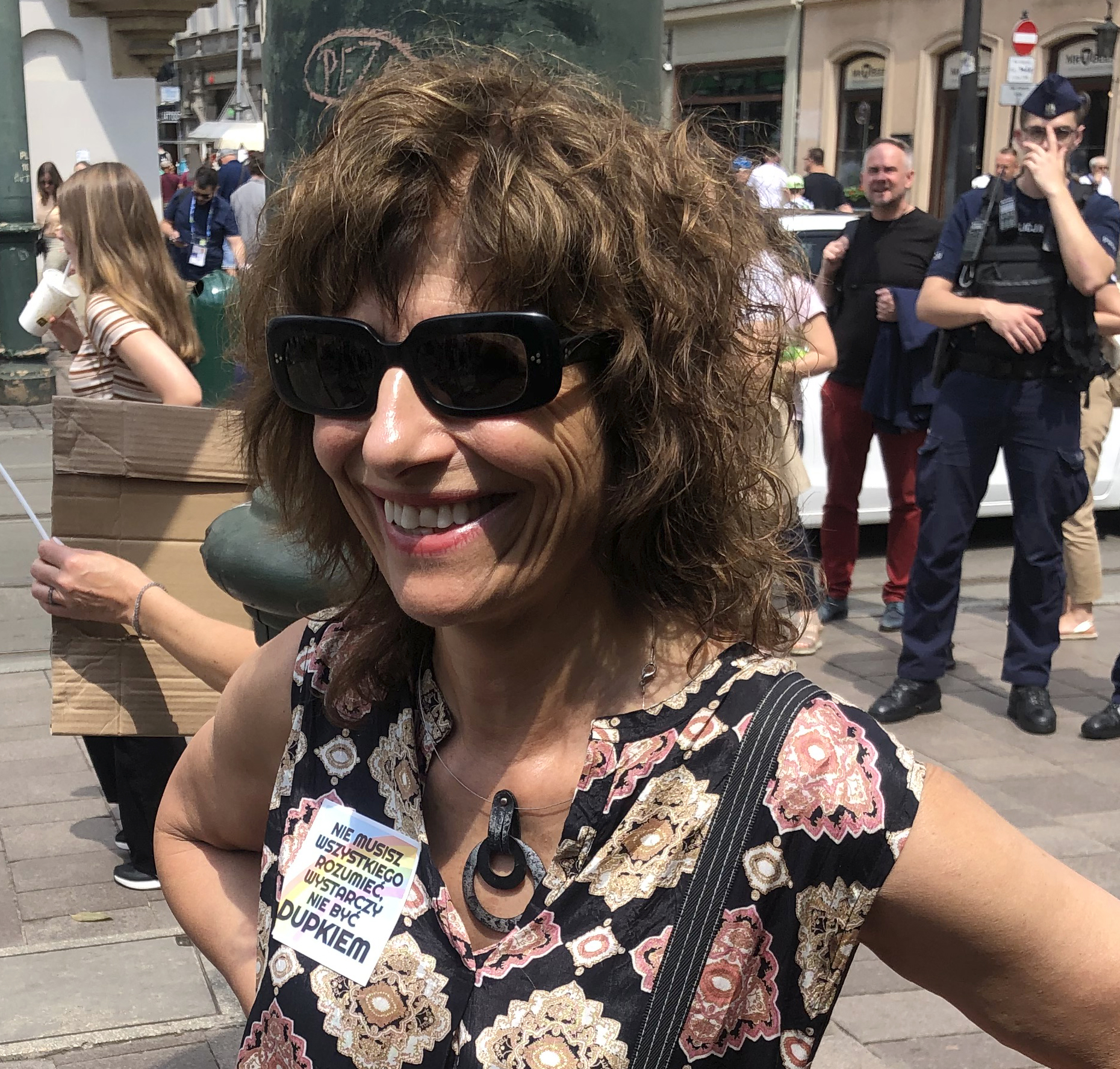
- Kewes in 2023
- Born: 1964 (age 61–62); Gdynia, Poland
- Occupations: Historian and academic
- Title: Professor of English Literature

Academic background
- Education: University of Gdańsk (MA); Jesus College, Oxford (DPhil)
- Thesis: Authorship and Appropriation: Concepts of Playwriting in England, 1660-1710 (1996)
- Doctoral advisor: Harriett Hawkins; Paul Hammond

Academic work
- Discipline: English studies; History
- Sub-discipline: Renaissance studies; Political history; Cultural history; English Renaissance theatre; Classical tradition
- Institutions: University College, Oxford; University of Wales, Aberystwyth; Jesus College, Oxford

Paulina Kewes FRHistS (born 1964) is a Polish scholar of early modern literature, history and culture. She is Professor of English Literature at the University of Oxford and Helen Morag Fellow and Tutor in English Literature at Jesus College.

== Academic career ==
Kewes was born in Gdynia in 1964 and grew up in Sopot. Her Russian Jewish father Borys was a survivor of the Holocaust and died when Kewes was 16. She began studying at the University of Gdańsk in 1983, completing an MA thesis on Black American women writers of the late 20th century. While studying and later teaching at the university she worked as a freelance translator and interpreter. She was then awarded a Soros Visiting Scholarship to the University of Oxford in 1991, her research being supervised by John Carey. A year later she won a graduate scholarship at Jesus College to complete her DPhil on dramatic authorship and literary property in late seventeenth and early eighteenth century England, which she completed in 1996. Her doctoral supervisor was Harriett Hawkins and later Paul Hammond upon Hawkins' death.

In 1995 Kewes was elected to a Junior Research Fellowship at University College, Oxford and in 1997 joined the University of Wales, Aberystwyth as a Lecturer in English Literature. She was later promoted to Senior Lecturer before returning to Jesus College as Fellow and Tutor in English Literature in 2003. In September 2017 she was awarded the Title of Distinction of Professor of English Literature by the University of Oxford.

In 2025, Green Party leader Zack Polanski accused Kewes of “fanning the flames of hate” in a since-deleted tweet on the social media platform X. In the post, Kewes (@PKewes) replied to a thread responding to a video published by Polanski. In the clip, Polanski refers to a “genocide in Gaza” and the need for “pro-migrant rhetoric” reasons why ex-Labour voters should join the Greens. In response, user @JonathanSGlass tweeted “Anti-semites – we want you!” in what appears to be a satirical reply to Polanski’s message. To this, Kewes replied “The browner, the better!”, which Polanski has since described as “deeply worrying”.

== Research ==
Building on her doctoral thesis, Kewes' early publications focused on the themes of plagiarism, appropriation, translation, adaptation and biography in the long eighteenth century. Her first monograph, Authorship and Appropriation: Writing for the Stage in England, 1660-1710, was published by Clarendon Press in 1998. Her first edited volume, Plagiarism in Early Modern England (2003), continued to explore such topics.

Kewes' chief research interests have since shifted to Elizabethan and early Stuart drama, particularly the genre's classical reception and historiography as well as the work of William Shakespeare. In 2020 she edited a special issue of Huntington Library Quarterly focused on the conceit of Ancient Rome in early modern English political culture. Edited volumes with Susan Doran in 2014 and Andrew McRae in 2019 have addressed the nature of the succession in Elizabethan and Stuart England. Kewes' historiographical interests were reflected in the edition of and handbook to Holinshed's Chronicles she produced, in collaboration with Ian Archer and Felicity Heal, for Oxford University Press in 2013.

=== Media work ===
In 2012 Kewes appeared in a podcast for History Extra discussing William Shakespeare's treatment of Richard III. In August 2015 Kewes appeared as a guest on BBC Radio 4's Great Lives series discussing Elizabeth I alongside Matthew Parris and Michael Howard.

In 2021, in celebration of the 450th anniversary of Jesus College, Kewes began assisting with the Jesus College Shakespeare Project. The project aims to stage one Shakespeare play per term until his entire dramatic canon has been performed. Schoolchildren are encouraged to attend performances and discuss the plays with the actors to widen access to Shakespeare and drama more generally. The project is expected to last until Hilary Term 2034.

In November 2026, Kewes was announced as the inaugural director of the Oxford–Poland Hub, an initiative which aims to "foster sustained scholarly collaboration, mutual understanding, and cultural exchange between the two communities, with special focus on the humanities, social sciences, museums and libraries". The hub is funded by the Polish National Agency for Academic Exchange with support from the Polish Ministry of Science and Higher Education, the Polish Embassy in London and the Polish Cultural Institute in London. Grants made by the hub are awarded by an academic board drawn from across the University of Oxford and the Oxford Polish Association. For Kewes, directing the hub allowed her to pay forward the support she received early in her academic career as a Soros Visiting Scholar, funded by the Oxford Colleges Hospitality Scheme which offered support for academics from central and eastern Europe.

== Publications ==
=== Books ===
- Authorship and Appropriation: Writing for the Stage in England, 1660-1710 (Oxford: Clarendon Press, 1998)
- Plagiarism in Early Modern England (Basingstoke: Palgrave Macmillan, 2003) (editor)
- The Uses of History in Early Modern England (San Marino, CA: Huntington Library Press, 2006) (editor)
- The Oxford Handbook to Holinshed's Chronicles (Oxford: Oxford University Press, 2013) (co-edited with Ian Archer and Felicity Heal)
- Doubtful and Dangerous: The Question of Succession in Late Elizabethan England (Manchester: Manchester University Press, 2014) (co-edited with Susan Doran)
- Stuart Succession Literature: Moments and Transformations (Oxford: Oxford University Press, 2019) (co-edited with Andrew McRae)

=== Journal articles ===
- '"Give me the sociable Pocket-books": Humphrey Moseley's Serial Publication of Octavo Play Collections', Publishing History 38 (1995), pp. 5–21
- 'Gerard Langbaine's View of Plagiaries: The Rhetoric of Dramatic Appropriation in the Restoration', The Review of English Studies 48 (1997), pp. 2–18
- '"A Play, which I presume to call original": Appropriation, Creative Genius, and Eighteenth-Century Playwriting', Studies in the Literary Imagination 34 (2001), pp. 17–47
- '"The State is out of Tune": Nicholas Rowe's Jane Shore and the Succession Crisis of 1713-1714', Huntington Library Quarterly 64 (2001), pp. 301–321
- 'Julius Caesar in Jacobean England', The Seventeenth Century 17 (2002), pp. 155–186
- 'Roman History and Early Stuart Drama: Thomas Heywood's The Rape of Lucrece', English Literary Renaissance 32 (2002), pp. 239–267
- 'Henry Savile's Tacitus and the Politics of Roman History in Late Elizabethan England', Huntington Library Quarterly 74:4 (2011), pp. 515–551
- '"A fit memoriall for the times to come...": Admonition and Topical Application in Mary Sidney's Antonius and Samuel Daniel's Cleopatra', The Review of English Studies 63 (2012), pp. 243–264
- '"A Mere Historian": Patrick Collinson and the Study of Literature', History 100 (2015), pp. 609–625
- '"I ask your voices and your suffrages": The Bogus Rome of Peele and Shakespeare's Titus Andronicus', The Review of Politics 78:4 (2016), pp. 551–570
- 'The 1553 Succession Crisis Reconsidered', Historical Research 90 (2017), pp. 465–485
- 'The State of Renaissance Studies: A World Well Lost?', English Literary Renaissance 50 (2020), pp. 76–82
- 'Translations of State: Ancient Rome and Late Elizabethan Political Thought', Huntington Library Quarterly 83 (2020)
- 'Early Modern Parliamentary Studies: Overview and New Perspectives', History Compass 21 (2023), (with Steven Gunn, Paul Seaward, Tracey Sowerby and Jim van der Meulen)
- "Visualising James VI and I in Continental Europe" in British Art Studies, 29 (December 2025), (with Susan Doran and David Hasberg Zirak-Schmidt)

=== Book chapters ===
- 'Between the "Triumvirate of Wit" and the Bard: The English Dramatic Canon, 1660-1720', in Cedric Brown and Arthur F. Marotti (eds.), Texts and Cultural Change in Early Modern England (Basingstoke: Macmillan, 1997), pp. 200–224
- 'Shakespeare and New Drama', in David Womersley (ed.), A Companion to Literature from Milton to Blake (Oxford: Blackwell Publishing, 2000), pp. 575–588
- 'Dryden and the Staging of Popular Politics', in Paul Hammond and David Hopkins (eds.), John Dryden: Tercentenary Essays (Oxford: Clarendon Press, 2000), pp. 57–91
- 'Plays as Property, 1660-1710', in Alan Houston and Steven Pincus (eds.), A Nation Transformed: England After the Restoration (Cambridge: Cambridge University Press, 2001), pp. 211–240
- 'Otway, Lee and the Restoration History Play', in Susan J. Owen (ed.), A Companion to Restoration Drama (Oxford: Blackwell Publishing, 2001), pp. 355–377
- 'Shakespeare's Lives in Print, 1662-1821', in Robin Myers, Michael Harris and Giles Mandelbrote (eds.), Lives in Print: Biography and the Book Trade from the Middle Ages to the 21st Century (London: Oak Knoll Books and Press, 2002), pp. 55–82
- 'The Elizabethan History Play: A True Genre?', in Richard Dutton and Jean E. Howard (eds.), A Companion to Shakespeare's Works, Volume II: The Histories (Oxford: Blackwell Publishing, 2003), pp. 170–193
- 'Dryden's Theatre and the Passion of Politics', in Steven Zwicker (ed.), The Cambridge Companion to John Dryden (Cambridge: Cambridge University Press, 2004), pp. 129–153
- 'Contemporary Europe in Elizabethan and Stuart Drama', in Andrew Hadfield and Paul Hammond (eds.), Shakespeare and Renaissance Europe (London: Nelson, 2004), pp. 150–192
- 'Jewish History and Christian Providence in Elizabethan England: The Contexts of Thomas Legge's Solymitana Clades (The Destruction of Jerusalem), c.1579-88', in Allen Michie and Eric Buckley (eds.), Style: Essays on Renaissance Poetics and Culture (Newark: University of Delaware Press, 2005), pp. 228–266
- 'Greek and Roman Drama' and 'French Drama', in Peter France and Stuart Gillespie (eds.), The Oxford History of Literary Translation in English (Oxford: Oxford University Press, 2005), pp. 241–252 and 317-327
- 'Acts of Oblivion, Acts of Remembrance: Rhetoric, Law, and National Memory in Early Restoration England', in Lorna Clymer (ed.), Ritual, Routine, and Regime: Institutions of Repetition in Euro-American Cultures, 1650-1832 (Toronto: University of Toronto Press, 2006), pp. 103–131
- 'Two Queens, One Inventory: The Lives of Mary and Elizabeth Tudor', in Kevin Sharpe and Steven Zwicker (eds.), Writing Lives: Biography and Textuality, Identity and Representation in Early Modern England (Oxford: Oxford University Press, 2008), pp. 187–207
- 'Godly Queens: The Royal Iconographies of Mary and Elizabeth', in Anna Whitelock and Alice Hunt (eds.), Tudor Queenship: The Reigns of Mary and Elizabeth (Basingstoke: Palgrave, 2010), pp. 47–62
- 'The Exclusion Crisis of 1553 and the Elizabethan Succession', in Susan Doran and Thomas S. Freeman (eds.), Mary Tudor: New Perspectives (Basingstoke: Palgrave, 2011), pp. 49–61
- 'History Plays and the Royal Succession', in Ian Archer, Felicity Heal and Paulina Kewes (eds.), The Oxford Handbook of Holinshed's Chronicles (Oxford: Oxford University Press, 2013), pp. 493–509
- 'Marlowe, History, and Politics', in Emily Bartels and Emma Smith (eds.), Christopher Marlowe in Context (Cambridge: Cambridge University Press, 2013), pp. 138–154
- 'The Puritan, the Jesuit, and the Jacobean Succession', in Susan Doran and Paulina Kewes (eds.), Doubtful and Dangerous: The Question of Succession in Late Elizabethan England (Manchester: Manchester University Press, 2014), pp. 47–70
- 'Roman History, Essex, and Late Elizabethan Political Culture', in R. Malcolm Smuts (ed.), The Oxford Handbook of the Age of Shakespeare (Oxford: Oxford University Press, 2016), pp. 250–268
- '"Ierusalem thou dydst promyse to buylde vp": Kingship, Counsel, and Early Elizabethan Drama', in Jacqueline Rose (ed.), The Politics of Counsel in England and Scotland, 1286-1707 (Oxford: Oxford University Press, 2016), pp. 171–192
- 'Romans in the Mirror', in Harriet Archer and Andrew Hadfield (eds.), Mirror for Magistrates in Context: Literature, History and Politics Before the Age of Shakespeare (Cambridge: Cambridge University Press, 2016), pp. 126–146
- 'Parliament and the Principle of Elective Succession in Elizabethan England', in Paul Cavill and Alexandra Gajda (eds.), Writing the History of Parliament in Tudor and Early Stuart England (Manchester: Manchester University Press, 2018), pp. 106–132
- '"The Idol of State Innovators and Republicans": Robert Persons's A Conference About the Next Succession (1594/5) in Stuart England', in Paulina Kewes and Andrew McRae (eds.), Stuart Succession Literature: Moments and Transformations (Oxford: Oxford University Press, 2019), pp. 149–185
- 'The Final Years: England, Scotland and the Succession (1588-1603)', in Susan Doran (ed.), Elizabeth and Mary: Royal Cousins, Rival Queens (London: British Library Publishing, 2021), pp. 245–251
- 'A Persian Mirror for English Magistrates: Thomas Preston's Cambises and the Coming to Terms with the Marian Past', in Krista Kesselring and Matthew Neufeld (eds.), Reckoning with History: Essays on the Uses of the Past (Montreal: McGill-Queen's University Press, 2024), pp. 40–63.
- 'Representative Assemblies in the Political Thought of Jean Bodin', in Gabriele Haug-Mortiz and Georg Vogeler (eds.), Digital Scholarly Edition and Pre-Modern Parliamentarianism: An Interdisciplinary Approach to Early Modern Sources (Göttingen: Vandenhoeck & Ruprecht, 2024)
- (with Susan Doran), "Joint Iconography for Joint Sovereigns: Mary Queen of Scots, James VI of Scotland, and the Campaign for Association, c. 1578–1584", in Yasmin Arshad and Chris Laoutaris (eds.), Women and Cultures of Portraiture in the British Literary Renaissance, ed. s (London: Bloomsbury Publishing, 2025), pp. 49–68.

== Honours and awards ==
Kewes is a fellow of the Royal Historical Society. In November 2020 she was awarded a Leverhulme Trust Major Research Fellowship to complete a three-year book project exploring the succession in Reformation England. She was also a co-investigator on the Arts and Humanities Research Council-funded Stuart Successions Project which in turn led to the development of the Stuarts Online web resource, also funded by the AHRC.

Between 2017 and 2022 Kewes was the Senior Member of the Oxford University Polish Society; she was the first woman to hold this position. She is currently a member of the editorial board of the journals Critical Survey and Postgraduate English.
