= London and Middlesex Archaeological Society =

- Abbreviation: LAMAS
- Formation: 1855
- Type: Learned society
- Purpose: The study of archaeology and local history within the City of London, Middlesex, and the Greater London area
- Location: London, United Kingdom
- Region served: Greater London
- President: Vanessa Harding
- Chair of Council: Harvey Sheldon
- Website: http://www.lamas.org.uk/

The London and Middlesex Archaeological Society (LAMAS) is a society founded in 1855 for the study of the archaeology and local history of the City of London and the historic county of Middlesex. It also takes an interest in districts that were historically in Surrey, Kent, Essex and Hertfordshire, but that now lie within Greater London. The Society receives support from the London Museum.

LAMAS and works in close association with the archaeological companies that work regularly in Greater London. Many of the lectures and contributions to the Annual Conference of London Archaeologists detail the latest archaeological research undertaken by:

- MoLA (Museum of London Archaeology);
- PCA (Pre-Construct Archaeology);
- AOC Archaeology; and
- Archaeology South-East.

It acts to some extent as an umbrella organisation to support smaller archaeological and local history societies in the Greater London area. It hosts an Annual Conference of London Archaeologists and an annual Local History Conference. LAMAS campaigns for public access to archaeology and heritage, including local museums, and for the sustainable management of listed and heritage buildings.

== History ==
The Society was established in 1855 "for the purpose of investigating the antiquities and early history of the Cities of London and Westminster and the Metropolitan County of Middlesex". The inaugural meeting was held on 14 December 1855 at Crosby Hall, Bishopsgate. The primary instigators were George Bish Webb (who was already honorary secretary of Surrey Archaeological Society, established the previous year, and who became the first honorary secretary of LAMAS); and Rev. Thomas Hugo, curate of St Botolph-without-Bishopsgate (who became the first chairman of LAMAS). Other founder members included Charles Boutell, Henry Christmas, George Gilbert Scott, and Charles Roach Smith. Boutell served as honorary secretary from 23 July to 27 November 1857, but was dismissed for what was termed "improper" bookkeeping involving the disappearance of £56 15s received in subscription fees. Also active in the early decades were John Gough Nichols and Edward Brabrook (the latter eventually serving as President from 1910 to 1930). Sir Thomas Phillipps was another early supporter, but allegedly withdrew on learning that Hugo had expressed a wish to see the restoration of the monasteries.

== Membership ==
Individual membership in the Society is open to all. In the early years, and until the late 1870s, membership seems to have stood at around 400. The total subsequently started to decline, falling to 277 in 1891, 163 in 1905, and 132 in 1911. It then began to recover, rising to 232 in 1939, 350 in 1950, and nearly 500 in 1955. The figure was 662 in 2004; 675 in 2010; and 608 in 2018.

Any archaeological or local history society in the Greater London area may become an Affiliated Society of LAMAS. As of 2024, there were 43 such affiliate members.

Details of individual or Affiliated Society membership are published on the LAMAS membership website. Current individual subscription is £20 per year.

== Campaigns ==
LAMAS campaigns to defend London's historic environment. The membership of the society contains numerous experts and specialists in various aspects of archaeology, heritage and the historic environment. The LAMAS Historic Building and Conservation Committee campaigns for the sustainable future of Greater London's built heritage. The committee comments on applications largely for works to listed buildings. Details of schemes the committee commented on can be found on the advocacy page.

The committee is currently campaigning against proposals to redevelop Liverpool Street Station. Details of the society's objection can be found here Liverpool Street Station.

LAMAS has objected to proposals for the development and use of the Royal Mint site for the new Chinese embassy.

== Publications ==
The Society's journal is entitled Transactions of the London and Middlesex Archaeological Society. It is published annually, and is issued free to members.

The historic numbering of the volumes of Transactions may cause confusion. The first volume was published in three parts between 1856 and 1860, and the final part of volume 6 appeared in 1890: these six volumes form what is now known as the "first series". The next volume was completed in 1905, and was numbered as volume 1 of the "new series". This new series continued to volume 11 (dated 1952). The decision was then taken to revert to the original scheme of numbering, and so the next volume, dated 1955, was numbered volume 18 (the numbers 12–17 having been omitted). Volume 73 is dated 2022.

All volumes of Transactions to volume 70 (2019) have been digitised, and are freely available to download from the Society's website.

Since 1976, the Society has also published occasional monographs or collections of essays in its "Special Papers" series. The 17th volume in this series was published in 2014. The first 16 volumes have been digitised, and are available to download from the Society's website. Three additional volumes of Special Papers, dealing with excavations in Southwark, Lambeth and Staines, have been published jointly with the Surrey Archaeological Society.

The Society publishes a Newsletter, which is produced three times a year and sent to all members. It is also available in digitised from on the Society's website.

== Lectures ==
From October to May each year LAMAS runs a series of public lectures. These are held both in person and online. They are free to attend for members and are open to the public for a small charge. Details of past lectures are online. Many are recorded and can be watched at the LAMAS YouTube page.

== LAMAS Lates ==
During the Summer, outside the lecture season, LAMAS runs a series of evening events called Lates. Past Lates have included guided walks and private visits to museums and heritage sites outside normal opening hours. Lates are advertised in the newsletter or by society email communication.

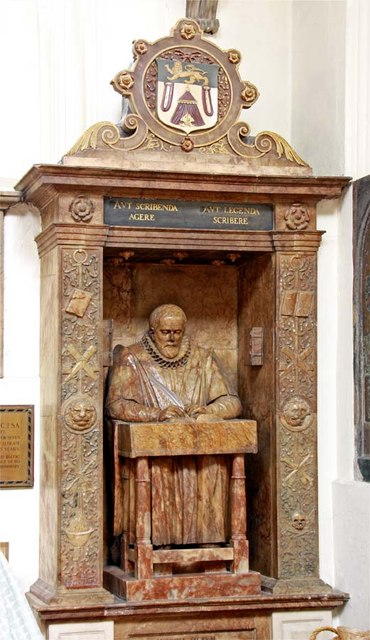
John Stow's monument in St Andrew Undershaft

== Stow Memorial Service ==
The Society is joint sponsor and organiser (with the Merchant Taylors' Company) of the regular Stow Memorial Service, held in the church of St Andrew Undershaft in the City of London. This commemorates the antiquary John Stow, author of the Survey of London (1598; second edition 1603), who is widely revered as the founding father of London history. The service is normally held close to the anniversary of Stow's death on 5 April, and includes an address by a respected London historian or archaeologist, and the replacement of the (real) quill pen held by Stow's effigy on his monument in the church. The service was first held in its present form in 1924, and was then held annually until 1991, including the years of the Second World War. No services could be held in 1992 or 1993 because of damage to the church caused by the Baltic Exchange bomb of 1992. The service was revived in 1994, but from 1996 to 2017 was held only once every three years. The service due to be held in 2020 was cancelled because of the COVID-19 pandemic, and the next service took place in April 2024.

== LAMAS Research Fund ==
The Society awards small grants (envisaged as totalling approximately £3,000–£5,000 per annum) to support research into the archaeology and history of London and Middlesex. The grants are available to all full individual members of the Society. The scheme was inaugurated in 2005 to mark the Society's 150th anniversary.

== Logo ==
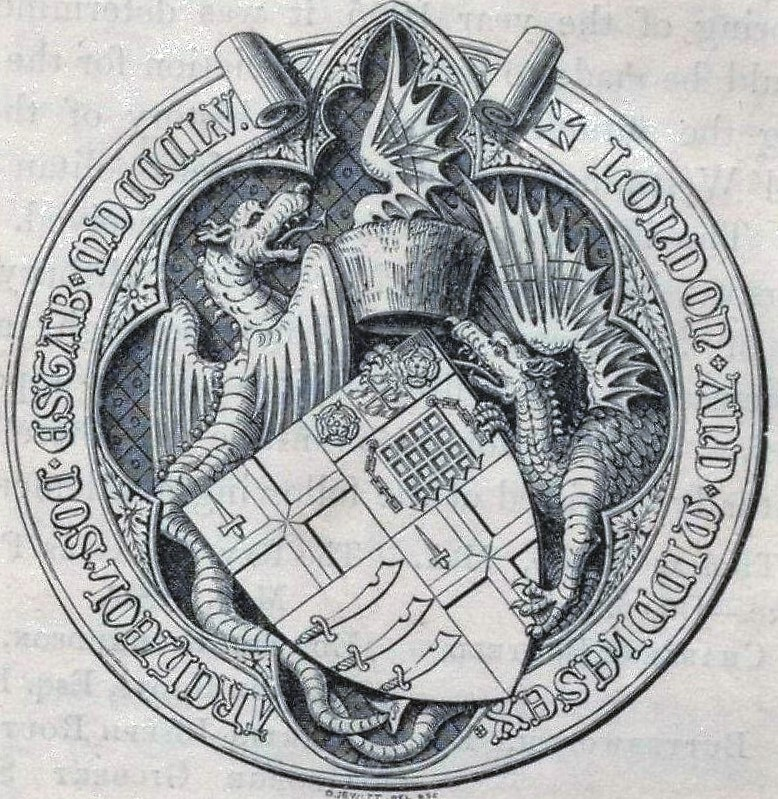
The Society's original device, engraved by Orlando Jewitt, used from 1855 to 1955

The Society's device or logo comprises a monochrome pseudo-heraldic coat of arms, combining elements of the authentic arms of the City of London, the City of Westminster and the county of Middlesex, as they normally appeared in the mid 19th century. The shield is quarterly, with the first and fourth quarters occupied by the arms of the City of London, the second by those of Westminster, and the third by those of Middlesex. The crest and supporters are taken from the arms of the City of London: a "Muscovy hat" surmounted by a dragon's wing charged with a cross, for the crest; and two dragons charged on the wings with crosses for supporters.

The first version of this device was introduced at the Society's foundation in 1855, and was engraved by Orlando Jewitt (one of the original members). This showed the combined arms presented as if on a medieval seal, and surrounded by the legend +LONDON⋅AND⋅MIDDLESEX⋅ARCHÆOL⋅SOC⋅ESTAB⋅MDCCCLV.

By the mid-20th century, Jewitt's design was considered "perhaps a little crowded", and, to mark the Society's centenary year, Kenneth Ody was asked to redraw it to "represent the taste of 1955". Ody's version displays simply the arms, without the background of the "seal". The only heraldic variation is that, whereas Jewitt had shown the supporters as two-legged wyverns, in Ody's design they appear (more correctly) as four-legged dragons. Beneath the arms, a motto scroll reads "1855". In Ody's full design, the arms were set within an oval border bearing the words "London and Middlesex Archaeological Society", but the border was often omitted, and was abandoned entirely in the early 1990s.

Arms of the City of London

Arms of the City of Westminster

Arms of Middlesex

== Presidents ==
The following have served as presidents of the Society:

- 1855–1860: Albert Denison, 1st Baron Londesborough
- 1860–1883: James Talbot, 4th Baron Talbot of Malahide
- 1883–1885: General Augustus Pitt Rivers
- 1885–1910: Edwin Freshfield
- 1910–1930: Edward Brabrook
- 1930–1942: Sir Montagu Sharpe
- 1943–1946: Edmund Byng, 6th Earl of Strafford
- 1947–1949: Harry Nathan, 1st Baron Nathan
- 1950–1958: W. F. Grimes
- 1959–1964: D. B. Harden
- 1965–1970: R. Michael Robbins
- 1971–1973: A. J. Taylor
- 1974–1976: Ralph Merrifield
- 1977–1979: Max Hebditch
- 1980–1981: Valerie Pearl
- 1982–1985: John Wilkes
- 1985–1988: John Kent
- 1988–1991: Derek Renn
- 1991–1992: Hugh Chapman
- 1992–1993: Derek Renn
- 1993–1996: Harvey Sheldon
- 1996–1999: Mark Hassall
- 1999–2002: Derek Keene
- 2002–2005: Clive Orton
- 2005–2008: Simon Thurley
- 2008–2011: Caroline Barron
- 2011–2014: Martin Biddle
- 2014–2017: John Clark
- 2017–2020: Taryn Nixon
- 2020–2023: Gillian Tindall
- 2023– : Vanessa Harding
