= Derek Keene =

English urban historian

Derek John Keene, FRHistS (27 December 1942 – 17 April 2021), was an English urban historian. He was founding director of the Centre for Metropolitan History from 1987 to 2002 at the Institute of Historical Research (IHR) and then Leverhulme Professor of Comparative Metropolitan History until retirement in 2008; since which he was Emeritus Professor of Metropolitan History and an honorary fellow of the IHR.

== Career ==
Born on 27 December 1942 in Lemsford, Hertfordshire, Derek John Keene was the son of Charles Henry Keene and his wife Edith Anne (née Swanston). After attending Ealing Grammar School, he was educated at Oriel College, Oxford, where he completed his undergraduate and doctoral studies; his DPhil was awarded in 1972 for his thesis "Some aspects of the history, topography and archaeology of the north eastern part of the medieval city of Winchester with special reference to the Brooks area". In 1968, Keene became a researcher at the Winchester Research Unit, and became its assistant director six years later. In 1979, he joined the Institute of Historical Research (IHR) where he led the Social Science Research Council-funded project "Social and economic survey of medieval London". He then proposed that the IHR establish its own centre dedicated to studying London's history, and this came to fruition in 1987 when the IHR set up the Centre for Metropolitan History with Keene as its first director. He served in that post until 2001, after which he was appointed Leverhulme Professor of Comparative Metropolitan History at the IHR. After retiring in 2008, he remained associated with the IHR as Emeritus Professor of Metropolitan History and as an honorary fellow.

== Committees ==
Reflecting his wide interest and knowledge of cities and towns both historic and modern, Keene contributed to many projects and committees. His committee membership included, among others: the Royal Commission on Historical Monuments, the Urban Panel], a committee of English Heritage and the Commission for Architecture and the Built Environment (CABE) and the Fabric Committee for St Paul's Cathedral until 2020. He was lead editor of the definitive history of St Paul's in 2004, together with co-editors Arthur Burns and Andrew Saint.

== Honours ==
Keene was a Fellow of the Royal Historical Society. He served as president of the London and Middlesex Archaeological Society in 1999–2002. He was the dedicatee of a 2012 festschrift, London and Beyond: Essays in Honour of Derek Keene.

== Selected publications ==
- (Co-authored with M. Burch and P. Treveil) The Development of Early Medieval and Later Poultry and Cheapside: Excavations at 1 Poultry and Vicinity, City of London, Museum of London Archaeology Monograph, no. 38 (Museum of London, 2011).
- (Lead editor with A. Burns and A. Saint) St Paul's The Cathedral Church of London 604-2004 (Blackwell's, 2004).
- (Co-authored with S. Letters, M. Fernandes and O. Myhill) Gazetteer of Markets and Fairs in England and Wales to 1516, 2 vols., List and Index Society Special Series, nos. 32–33 (List and Index Society, 2003).
- (Co-authored with B. M. S. Campbell, J. Galloway and M. Murphy) A Medieval Capital and its Grain Supply: Agrarian Production and Distribution in the London Region c. 1300, Historical Geography Research Paper Series, no. 31 (Institute of British Geographers, 1993).
- (Co-authored with V. Harding) Historical Gazetteer of London before the Great Fire: Part 1: Cheapside (Centre for Metropolitan History, 1987).
- Cheapside before the Great Fire (Economic and Social Research Council, 1985).
- (Co-authored with V. Harding) A Survey of Documentary Sources for Property Holding in London before the Great Fire, London Record Society, no. 22 (London Record Society, 1985).
- Survey of Medieval Winchester, 2 vols., Winchester Studies series, no. 2 (Clarendon Press, 1985).
- (Co-authored with F. Barlow, M. Biddle and O. von Feilitzen) Winchester in the Early Middle Ages: an Edition and Discussion of the Winton Domesday, Winchester Studies series, no. 1 (Clarendon Press, 1976).

== Personal life ==
Derek was married to the academic and conservator Suzanne Keene (née Forbes) in 1969; they had two children.

His family came from Derbyshire and Yorkshire. Derek's parents lived in Holloway during the war and moved to Northolt soon afterwards. He attended Ealing Grammar School and afterwards studied history at Oriel College, Oxford. He then began work on his PhD on the history of Winchester, supervised by W.A. Pantin, and joined the archaeological excavations in Winchester under Martin Biddle where he met Suzanne.

Keene's interests included woodworking and joinery and also in rural pursuits including scything, hedge laying and woodland management. He travelled widely, often with Suzanne. As an undergraduate he was a member of expeditions to Greece and Libya. While in Libya he contracted amoebic dysentery and received excellent treatment in hospital in Sabha, Libya, an experience that he remembered all his life and often referred to, sometimes comparing it favourably to hospitals in the UK. He had many friends and professional colleagues in numerous countries, especially Italy, France and the United States. His other interests included hiking, in countries both hot such as Cyprus, Crete and Spain, and cold including Scotland and Norway.

Keene died from Alzheimer's disease at a care home in Croydon on 17 April 2021, at the age of 78.
