= Women of Westminster =

2019 non-fiction book by Rachel Reeves

- Author: Rachel Reeves
- Language: English
- Publisher: I.B. Tauris
- Publication date: 2019
- Publication place: United Kingdom
- Media type: Print
- Pages: 320
- ISBN: 9781788316767

Women of Westminster: The MPs who Changed Politics is a 2019 non-fiction book written by Rachel Reeves, covering the female MPs elected in the century between the book's publication and Nancy Astor taking her seat in the Commons in 1919—the first woman to do so.

== Synopsis ==
Women of Westminster chronicles the stories of women elected as Members of Parliament in the 100 years that they have. Reeves covers both known and lesser known members, including Eleanor Rathbone, Barbara Castle, Harriet Harman, Tessa Jowell, Shirley Summerskill and Nancy Astor. She also covers the misogyny they faced—from Astor being obstructed from taking her seat to "overt sexual harassment" of members such as Shirley Williams. Reeves makes use of both archival material and on interviews she conducted with members including Diane Abbott, Betty Boothroyd and Theresa May.

== Reception ==
Francesca Morphakis, reviewing the book for the journal Twentieth Century British History, found that despite Reeves aim to explore lesser known female MPs the work was too focused on the "weighty figures" such as Ellen Wilkinson and Barbara Castle. Likewise, Krista Cowman, in the Journal of British Studies, found "disappointingly, much of the biographical material centers on figures already well served by autobiographies and biographies". On the other hand, Adam McKie, in Parliamentary History, felt that Reeves had achieved "her stated aim of celebrating those who have 'largely been forgotten from our history'".

Additionally, Cowman also found "Reeves is sometimes less critical of her subjects than she might be." Morphakis also found the book to be party-politically biased, with it "ultimately designed to celebrate the achievements of Labour MPs."

The Fabian Society's Kate Murray was particularly impressed with the interview portions of the book and how they "show how casual – and not so casual – sexism has continued to make the life of women MPs difficult". Charlotte Henry, in The Times Literary Supplement, called the book an "important and well-written record of the obstacles faced by women in politics, highlighting both what has been achieved and what also still needs to be done".
