= Susan Doran =

British historian (born 1948)

Professor Susan Doran FRHistS
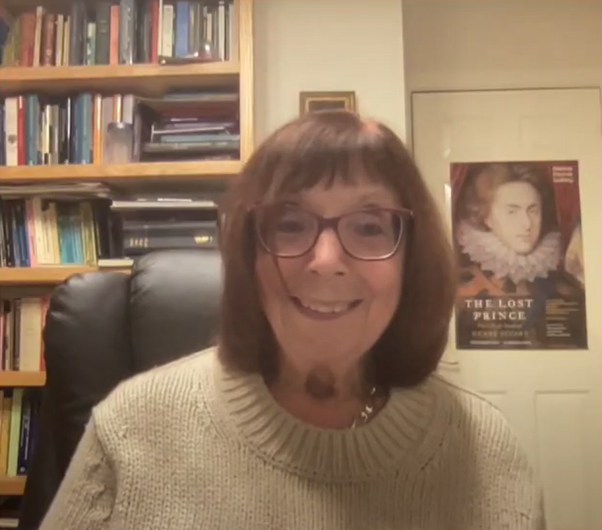
- Doran speaks to the British Library in 2021.
- Born: Susan Michelle Savitt; 7 February 1948 (age 78); London, United Kingdom
- Occupations: Historian and academic
- Title: Professor of Early Modern British History
- Spouse: Alan Doran
- Children: 2

Academic background
- Education: St Anne's College, Oxford; University College London
- Thesis: The Political Career of Thomas Radcliffe, 3rd Earl of Sussex (1526?–1583) (1977)

Academic work
- Discipline: History
- Sub-discipline: Early modern Britain; political history; History of religions; English Reformation
- Institutions: St Paul's Girls' School; St Mary's University College; Christ Church, Oxford; St Benet's Hall, Oxford; Jesus College, Oxford

Susan Michelle Doran FRHistS (née Savitt; born 7 February 1948) is an English historian whose primary studies surround the reign of Elizabeth I, in particular the theme of marriage and succession. She has published and edited sixteen books, notably Elizabeth I and Religion, 1558–1603, Monarchy and Matrimony and Queen Elizabeth I, the last part of the British Library's Historic Lives series.

Doran is Professor of Early Modern British History at the University of Oxford and Senior Research Fellow at Jesus College. She was a Fellow of St Benet's Hall prior to its closure in 2022.

== Early life ==
Doran was born in London and, with her sister and grandmother, attended South Tottenham synagogue weekly and during High Holy Days as a child. Her father was involved in the Association of Jewish Ex-Servicemen and Women.

== Academic career ==
Doran read History at St Anne's College, Oxford before obtaining a PGCE and beginning a teaching career at St Paul's Girls' School in Hammersmith. In 1977 Doran completed a PhD at University College London, with her thesis being a political biography of Thomas Radclyffe, 3rd Earl of Sussex. Beginning in 1986 she taught early modern British and European history at St Mary's University College in Strawberry Hill, serving as head of the History Department for several years. When she left the college in 2001, she was Reader in History.

Doran returned to the University of Oxford as a lecturer at Christ Church in 2002. In 2004 she was elected a Fellow of St Benet's Hall, Oxford, and in 2009 was elected a Senior Research Fellow at Jesus College, Oxford. In 2016 the university awarded her the title of Professor of Early Modern British History. In 2018 Doran served as acting Master of St Benet's Hall while Werner Jeanrond was on sabbatical.

Doran is a Fellow of the Royal Historical Society and an Honorary Fellow of the Historical Association.

=== Broadcasting ===
Doran has appeared in many historical documentaries and podcasts as an expert commentator.

Doran has participated in numerous Tudor history documentaries produced by the BBC. In 2016 she appeared in an episode of A Timewatch Guide focused on Elizabeth I, presented by Vanessa Collingridge. In 2020 she appeared in Royal History's Biggest Fibs, presented by Lucy Worsley, discussing the Spanish Armada and the relationship between Elizabeth I and Philip II of Spain. She also appeared in 2021's The Boleyns: A Scandalous Family, discussing Henry VIII's marriage to Anne Boleyn.

Other documentary appearances include the 2010 National Geographic film Secrets of the Virgin Queen and an episode of the 2015 Yesterday series Medieval Murder Mysteries focused on the death of Amy Robsart. In 2018 she acted as a historical consultant for an episode of Britain's Most Historic Towns, presented by Alice Roberts, exploring the city of Norwich in the Tudor period. She has also presented numerous lecture courses on Tudor history for the online learning platform Massolit.

In May 2009 Doran made an appearance in the BBC Radio 4 series The Hidden Henry discussing Henry VIII's role as a father with Lucy Wooding. In March 2019 she appeared as a guest on the Radio 4 programme In Our Time, discussing the life of William Cecil alongside John Guy and Diarmaid MacCulloch. In April 2024 Doran was the guest for the first ever live recording of Suzannah Lipscomb's podcast Not Just the Tudors at the Gloucester History Festival's spring weekend, where she discussed the succession of James I to the English throne.

== Personal life ==
Doran is married to Alan Doran, an economist specialising in the developing world. They have two children together, including the writer Bathsheba Doran, and three grandchildren.

Doran has Jewish heritage and although she does not class herself as observant or a believer, her family keeps a semi-kosher home. She and her husband founded the Oxford Masorti Group, which holds monthly services within the Oxford Jewish Congregation.

== Publications ==
=== Monographs ===
- Susan Doran (1986). England and Europe, 1485–1603. Longman. ISBN 9780582354128.
- Susan Doran; Christopher Durston (1991). Princes, pastors, and people: the Church and religion in England, 1500–1700. Routledge. ISBN 978-0-415-20578-8.
- Susan Doran (1994). Elizabeth I and religion, 1558–1603. Routledge. ISBN 978-0-415-07352-3.
- Susan Doran (1996). Monarchy and matrimony: the courtships of Elizabeth I. Routledge. ISBN 978-0-415-11969-6.
- Susan Doran (1998). England and Europe in the sixteenth century. Macmillan Education. ISBN 9781349269907.
- Susan Doran (2000). Elizabeth I and foreign policy, 1558–1603. Routledge. ISBN 978-0-415-15355-3.
- Susan Doran (2003). Queen Elizabeth I. New York University Press. ISBN 978-0-8147-1957-2.
- Susan Doran (2007). Mary Queen of Scots: an illustrated life. British Library. ISBN 9780712349161.
- Susan Doran (2008). The Tudor chronicles. Quercus. ISBN 9781847244222.
- Susan Doran (2015). Elizabeth I and her circle. Oxford University Press. ISBN 9780191033551.
- Susan Doran (2016). The Connell guide to the Tudors. Connell Guides. ISBN 9781911187486.
- Susan Doran (2024). From Tudor to Stuart: the regime change from Elizabeth I to James I. Oxford University Press. ISBN 9780198754640.

=== Edited volumes ===
- Susan Doran, ed. (2003). Elizabeth: the exhibition at the National Maritime Museum. Chatto & Windus. ISBN 9780701174767.
- Susan Doran; Thomas Freeman, eds. (2003). The myth of Elizabeth. Macmillan Education. ISBN 9780333930830.
- Susan Doran; Glenn Richardson, eds. (2005). Tudor England and its neighbours. Macmillan Education. ISBN 9780333946114.
- Susan Doran; David Starkey, eds. (2009). Henry VIII: man and monarch. British Library. ISBN 9780712350259.
- Susan Doran; Thomas Freeman, eds. (2009). Tudors and Stuarts on film: historical perspectives. Macmillan Education. ISBN 9781403940704.
- Susan Doran; Norman Jones, eds. (2011). The Elizabethan world. Routledge. ISBN 9780415409599.
- Susan Doran; Thomas Freeman, eds. (2011). Mary Tudor: old and new perspectives. Bloomsbury Academic. ISBN 9780230004634.
- Robert J. Blyth; Susan Doran, eds. (2012). Royal river: power, pageantry and the Thames. Scala Books. ISBN 9781857597004.
- Susan Doran; Paulina Kewes, eds. (2014). Doubtful and dangerous: the question of succession in late Elizabethan England. Manchester University Press. ISBN 9780719086069.
- Susan Doran, ed. (2021). Elizabeth and Mary: royal cousins, rival queens. British Library. ISBN 9780712353489.

=== Book chapters ===
- 'Why did Elizabeth not marry?', in Julia M. Walker, ed., Dissing Elizabeth: negative representations of Gloriana (Duke University Press, 1998)
- 'Three late-Elizabethan succession tracts', in Jean-Christophe Mayer, ed., The struggle for the succession in late Elizabethan England: politics, polemics and cultural Representations (Paul Valéry University Montpellier 3, 2004)
- 'The politics of Renaissance Europe', in Paul Hammond and Andrew Hadfield, eds., Shakespeare and Renaissance Europe (Arden Press, 2004)
- 'James VI and the succession', in Ralph Houlbrooke, ed., James VI and I: ideas and government (Ashgate Publishing, 2006)
- 'Elizabeth I and Catherine de' Medici', in Glenn Richardson, ed., Contending kingdoms: England and France, 1430–1700 (Ashgate Publishing, 2007)
- 'Elizabeth I: an Old Testament queen', in Anna Whitelock and Alice Hunt, eds., Rethinking Tudor Queenship: Mary and Elizabeth (Palgrave Macmillan, 2010)
- 'Elizabeth I and her favourites: the case of Sir Walter Ralegh', in Donald Stump, Linda Shenk and Carole Levin, eds., Elizabeth I and the "sovereign arts": essays in literature, history, and culture (University of Arizona Press, 2011)
- 'Tudor kings and queens', in Ian Archer, Felicity Heal and Paulina Kewes, eds., The Oxford handbook of Holinshed's Chronicles (Oxford University Press, 2012)
- 'Queen Elizabeth I of England: monarchical leadership in action', in Peter Kaufman, ed., Leadership and Elizabethan culture (Palgrave Macmillan, 2013)
- 'Elizabeth I and counsel', in Jacqueline Rose, ed., The politics of counsel in England and Scotland, 1286–1707 (British Academy and Oxford University Press, 2016)
- 'Monarchy and masculinity in early modern England', in Christopher Fletcher and Rachel Moss, eds., Handbook of masculinity and political culture (Palgrave Macmillan, 2017)
- 'Did Elizabeth I's gender really matter?', in Anna Riehl Bertolet, ed., Queens matter: early modern studies in honour of Carole Levin (Palgrave Macmillan, 2017)

=== Journal articles ===
- 'The finances of an Elizabethan nobleman: Thomas Radcliffe, third earl of Sussex', Historical Research 61 (1988)
- 'Politics and religion at Elizabeth I's court: the Habsburg marriage negotiations 1559–1567', English Historical Review 104 (1989)
- 'Juno versus Diana: Elizabeth I's marriage in plays and entertainments 1561–81', The Historical Journal 38 (1995)
- 'Revenge her foul and most unnatural murder? The impact of Mary Stuart's execution on Anglo–Scottish relations', History 85 (2000)
- 'Elizabeth I's religion: the evidence of her letters', Journal of Ecclesiastical History 51 (2000)
- '1603: a jagged succession', Historical Research 93:261 (2020)
- 'Dynastic history from a Catholic perspective', British Catholic History 35:1 (2020)
- 'Visualising James VI and I in Continental Europe', British Art Studies, 29 (December 2025), with David Hasberg Zirak-Schmidt and Paulina Kewes
