= Lucy Wooding =

Historian and academic

Professor Lucy Wooding FRHistS
- Born: Lucy Elizabeth Catherine Wooding
- Occupations: Historian and academic
- Title: Professor of History
- Children: 3

Academic background
- Education: Magdalen College, Oxford
- Thesis: From humanists to heretics: English Catholic theology and ideology, c.1530–c.1570 (1994)
- Doctoral advisor: Susan Brigden

Academic work
- Discipline: History
- Sub-discipline: Early modern Britain; History of religions; Social history; English Reformation
- Institutions: Queen's University Belfast; King's College London; Lincoln College, Oxford
- Doctoral students: Elizabeth Norton
- Notable works: Tudor England: A History

Lucy Elizabeth Catherine Wooding FRHistS (also Kostyanovsky) is a British historian of Tudor England. She is Professor of History at the University of Oxford and Langford Fellow and Tutor in History at Lincoln College.

== Academic career ==
Wooding completed her undergraduate and doctoral degrees at Magdalen College, Oxford, where her doctoral supervisor was Susan Brigden. After completing her DPhil in 1994 she became a lecturer at Queen's University Belfast, before moving to King's College London in 1995. She became Reader in History at King's in 2015 before she joined Lincoln College in October 2016, succeeding her former supervisor Brigden as the college's tutor in early modern history. She was awarded the Title of Distinction of Professor of History by the University of Oxford in October 2024.

Wooding has served as Fellow Archivist and Welfare Dean for Lincoln College since 2021 and as Director of Undergraduate Studies for the Faculty of History from 2022 to 2025.

She is an elected Fellow of the Royal Historical Society (FRHistS).

=== Research ===
Wooding's doctoral research focused on Catholic theology during the English Reformation, and she published her first monograph on this topic, Rethinking Catholicism in Reformation England, in 2000. Her second book, published in 2009, was a biography of Henry VIII. Reformation historian Peter Marshall called the book "the best general biography of Henry VIII in nearly half a century". Her third, Tudor England: A History, was published by Yale University Press in 2022.

Beyond her monographs, Wooding has contributed journal articles and book chapters on subjects such as Erasmus' Bible translations, John Jewel's Apology for the Church of England, and the printing of books during the Marian Restoration.

=== Media work ===
Wooding has appeared as a panelist on the BBC Radio 4 programme In Our Time twice: in November 2009, discussing the Münster rebellion with Diarmaid MacCulloch and Charlotte Methuen, and in February 2025 discussing Catherine of Aragon with Gonzalo Velasco Berenguer and Maria Hayward. Also in 2009 Wooding appeared in an episode of the Radio 4 series The Hidden Henry discussing Henry VIII's role as a father with Susan Doran. She has appeared thrice on Suzannah Lipscomb's podcast Not Just the Tudors, discussing life in Tudor England in November 2022, the life of Henry VIII in November 2023 and his beliefs in March 2025.

Wooding also contributes reviews of early modern history books to Literary Review, London Review of Books, Times Higher Education and Times Literary Supplement. She has also written for the magazine History Today.

== Personal life ==
Wooding has three children.

== Bibliography ==
=== Books ===
- Rethinking Catholicism in Reformation England (Oxford: Clarendon Press, 2000)
- Henry VIII (London: Routledge, 2009)
- Tudor England: A History (New Haven: Yale University Press, 2022)

=== Articles ===
- 'Charity, Community and Reformation Propaganda', Reformation 11 (2006), pp. 131–169
- 'Richard Whitford's Werke for Housholders: Humanism, Monasticism and Tudor Household Piety', Studies in Church History 50 (2014), pp. 161–173
- 'Erasmus and the Politics of Translation in Tudor England', Studies in Church History 53 (2017), pp. 132–145
- 'Encountering the Word of God in Early Tudor England', English Historical Review 136 (2021), pp. 836–866

=== Chapters ===
- 'From Tudor Humanism to Reformation Preaching', in Peter McCullough, Hugh Adlington and Emma Rhatigan, eds., The Oxford Handbook of the Early Modern Sermon (Oxford: Oxford University Press, 2011), pp. 328–347
- 'Remembrance in the Eucharist', in Andrew Gordon and Thomas Rist, eds., The Arts of Remembrance in Early Modern England: Memorial Cultures of the Post-Reformation (Farnham: Ashgate Publishing, 2013), pp. 19–36
- 'Catholicism, the Printed Book and the Marian Restoration', in Vincent Gillespie and Susan Powell, eds., A Companion to the Early Printed Book in Britain, 1476-1558 (Woodbridge: Boydell & Brewer, 2014), pp. 307–324
- 'Reading the Crucifixion in Tudor England', in Sabrina Corbellini, Margriet Hoogvliet and Bart Ramakers, eds., Discovering the Riches of the Word: Religious Reading in Late Medieval and Early Modern Europe (Leiden: Brill Publishers, 2015), pp. 282–310
- '"So sholde lewde men lerne by ymages": Religious Imagery and Bible Learning', in Robert Armstrong and Tadhg Ó Hannracháin, eds., The English Bible in the Early Modern World (Leiden: Brill Publishing, 2018), pp. 29–52
- 'John Jewel, Elizabethan Religion and the Invention of the Church of England', in Sarah Bastow, André A. Gazal and Angela Ranson, eds., Defending the Faith: John Jewel and the Elizabethan Church (University Park: Penn State University Press, 2019), pp. 1–17
