= Clive Holmes (historian) =

English historian (1943–2022)

Clive Holmes FRHistS
- Born: Clive Anthony Holmes; 10 November 1943
- Died: 25 July 2022 (aged 78); Oxford, England
- Occupations: Historian and academic
- Spouse: Felicity Heal (m. 1988)
- Children: 2

Academic background
- Education: Dulwich College
- Alma mater: Gonville and Caius College, Cambridge
- Doctoral advisor: J. H. Plumb

Academic work
- Discipline: History
- Sub-discipline: Early modern Britain; History of English law; Witchcraft; Colonial history of the United States; English Civil War
- Institutions: Christ's College, Cambridge; Cornell University; Lady Margaret Hall, Oxford
- Doctoral students: Miranda Kaufmann; Peter Sherlock

Clive Anthony Holmes FRHistS (10 November 1943 – 25 July 2022) was an English historian of the Early Modern Britain period, especially the Tudor and Stuart periods as well as the English Civil War. He was on the Faculty of History, University of Oxford for many years and before that, had a lengthy stay at Cornell University in the United States. He was regarded as a respected senior scholar who had a wide range of research interests, some of which included the history of English law, early modern witchcraft, Fens drainage, and colonial North America. Holmes was known for his commitment to teaching and his excellence in that endeavour, winning teaching awards at both Cornell and Oxford. As an obituary in The Telegraph stated, "Holmes was first and foremost a charismatic teacher who inspired generations of students ... he retained an extraordinary zest for communicating ideas in tutorials, seminars, and lectures throughout his long career."

== Early life and education ==
Holmes' father was in the Metropolitan Police. Via a scholarship, Clive Holmes attended a public school, Dulwich College, then went on as an undergraduate at Gonville and Caius College, Cambridge, where he read history. He continued with graduate studies at Caius, where he studied under the historian J. H. Plumb and was inspired by the classicist Moses Finley. His doctoral thesis was completed in 1968 and concerned the Eastern Association.

Holmes subsequently taught at Cambridge, having a research fellowship at Christ's College, Cambridge, where Plumb was. However, Plumb encouraged Holmes to explore being at an Ivy League institution in the United States.

== Years in the United States ==
Holmes came to Cornell University in 1969 when he joined its Department of History. An initial appointment for a three-year period was extended into a full professorship, with tenure, and he would spend almost two decades in Ithaca.

During his time there, he published The Eastern Association in the English Civil War (1974), a revision for publication of his PhD thesis. A study of that administrative organisation of counties and its military and political aspects, it made his reputation and drew praise from scholars such as Christopher Hill and J. P. Cooper. He also established a distinction as an expert scholar on the subject of the history of English law. His journal article "The County Community in Stuart Historiography" (1980) argued against the then-fashionable "county community" theory which held that early modern England was more a grouping of localities with their own interests than a coherent nation-state. Historian John Morrill later recognised it as a "penetrating article"; it did much to reverse a historiographic current, and fit an overall pattern of Holmes not signing on to fashionable trends. Holmes paired this with Seventeenth-century Lincolnshire (also 1980), in which he emphasised that both local and national identities were prevalent in that county at that time. Morrill has characterised some of Holmes' work as having "brilliantly unraveled" historical evidence.

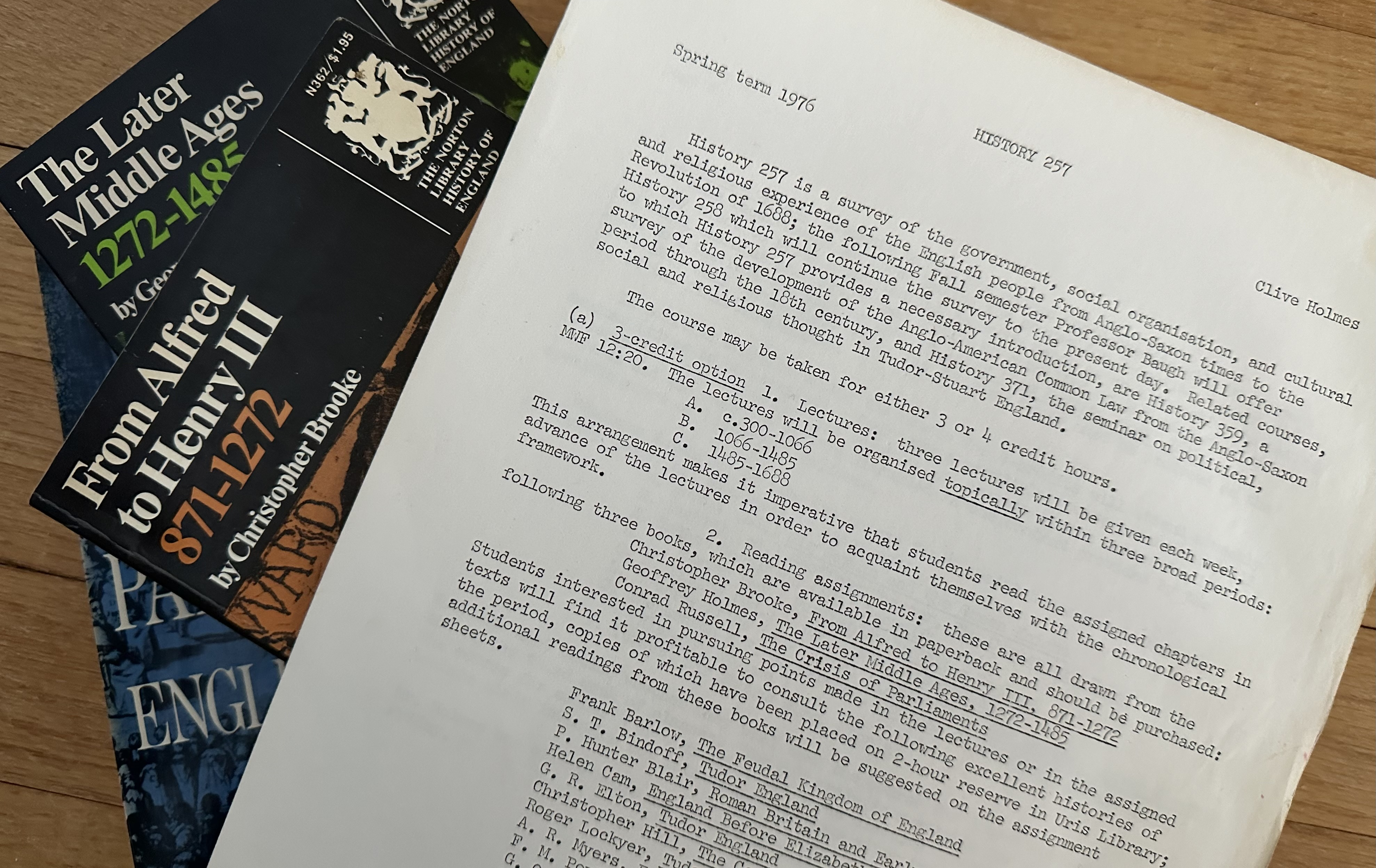
Reading list and core books used in Holmes' Spring 1976 course at Cornell, History 257 "English History from Anglo-Saxon Times to the Revolution of 1688"

Courses that Holmes taught at Cornell included "English History from Anglo-Saxon Times to the Revolution of 1688", "The Early Development of the Anglo-American Common Law", "History of England Under the Tudors and Stuarts", and "The English Civil War, 1640–1660". At times he also taught in some large-lecture courses on Western Civilisation. He won the Clark Award for distinguished teaching at Cornell in 1975.

While at Cornell he researched the history of witchcraft in England, such as the Witchcraft Acts, taking advantage of a large collection of materials that the Cornell co-founder Andrew Dickson White had amassed. Exploring the interactions between the thoughts and beliefs of the accused and the English legal structure, Holmes was of the view that any analysis of the persecution of witches had to take gender and misogyny into account.

In 1980, he was named to chair the Provost's Commission on Writing, which sought to improve the level of compositional abilities among undergraduates and compare the effectiveness of such things as Cornell's freshman seminar programme to what other universities were doing.

== Back to England ==
Liking life at Cornell but seeking to be closer to his source materials, Holmes returned to England in 1987, joining the Faculty of History, University of Oxford and taking a position at Lady Margaret Hall, Oxford where he became both a Fellow and a Tutor.

By 1997, Holmes was being termed a "versatile and highly accomplished senior British scholar". Subsequently, he was described as one of the "senior scholars who engender ... respect and loyalty". He was elected to be on the Council of the Royal Historical Society in 2004.

Holmes was active in administration activities in the Faculty of History, including being an admissions tutor and chairing the Honour Moderations process as well as the Final Honours Scheme. He received a teaching award from Oxford in 2005. Among the subjects he taught at Oxford were "Nobility and Gentry in England, 1560–1660", "Commonwealth and Protectorate, 1647–58", and "Law and Legal Institutions in Early Modern Europe".

Holmes was married twice, with two sons by the first of those marriages. His second marriage was to the British historian Felicity Heal, with whom he sometimes collaborated. The aforementioned "Nobility and Gentry" was jointly taught by the two, and then developed into the co-authored monograph The Gentry in England and Wales, 1500–1700, published in 1994. This study of the landed gentry garnered positive notices. A review of it in Albion: A Quarterly Journal Concerned with British Studies said that "It will remain the standard introduction and work of reference on the subject of gentry studies for years to come."

The English Civil War period was a prime topic for conflicting and sometimes strident views among historians and Holmes was no exception. His reading of the historical evidence got him into two pronounced academic disputes, one with Mark Kishlansky of Harvard University regarding Charles I's rule and another with Sean Kelsey of the University of Buckingham over the same monarch's trial.

Holmes retired from Lady Margaret Hall in 2011, at which point he became an emeritus Fellow and Lecturer in History. A conference was held in his honour and a Festschrift subsequently emerged from it, published by Routledge, Revolutionary England, c.1630–c.1660: Essays for Clive Holmes. A review in the journal Parliamentary History said that while such volumes typically get unsure responses, "in this case it seems worthwhile to honour the recipient". He continued to actively research and publish after his retirement; however, a lengthy planned work on the early modern history of the Court of Chancery was never completed.

Holmes died at his home in Oxford in 2022.

== Selected publications ==
- The Suffolk Committees for Scandalous Ministers, 1644–1646 (Suffolk Records Society, 1970) [editor]
- The Eastern Association in the English Civil War (Cambridge University Press, 1974)
- Seventeenth-century Lincolnshire (Society for Lincolnshire History and Archaeology, 1980)
- "The County Community in Stuart Historiography" (Journal of British Studies, 1980)
- The Gentry in England and Wales, 1500–1700 (Macmillan, 1994) [co-author with Felicity Heal]
- "Why Did the Prosecution of Witches Cease in England?" (Historical Association, 2013)
