= Faculty of History =

Faculty of History may refer to:

- Faculty of History, University of Cambridge
- Faculty of History, University of Oxford
- MSU Faculty of History (Moscow State University)
