= John Kent (numismatist) =

British numismatist (1926–2000)

John Philip Cozens Kent, FSA, FBA (28 September 1928 – 22 October 2000) was a British numismatist and archaeologist.

He was born the son of a railway official in Hertfordshire and educated at Minchenden Grammar School and University College, London, where he was awarded a BA in 1949 and a PhD in 1951. After two years National Service he was appointed Assistant Keeper in the British Museum’s Department of Coins and Medals.

There his main interest was the coins of the late Roman period, contributing to the reference book on Late Roman Bronze Coinage which was published in 1960. Other work covered the reclassification of imitative early medieval coins of the 5th century, assisting on the dating of the Sutton Hoo burial ship and the use of gold coinage in the late Roman Empire. However his major published works were Volume VIII and X in the Roman Imperial Coinage series. Volume VIII, published in 1981, covered the period from the death of the Emperor Constantine in AD 337 to the accession of Valentinian in AD 364. Volume X, published in 1994, covered the period from the division of the Roman Empire in AD 395 to the accession of Anastasius in AD 491. He also completed two volumes on the Continental Celtic Coins in the British Museum and other collections left incomplete by the death of previous keeper Derek Allen, which were published in 1987 and 1990.

Between 1960 and 1967, Kent directed excavations at South Mimms Castle in Middlesex. The results were published in 2013, after Kent's death; the book was based on drafts prepared by Kent and Anthony Streeten and updated by Derek Renn.

In 1974 he was promoted Deputy Keeper, and in 1983 Keeper, of the British Museum's coin and medal collection, a post he held until his retirement in 1990. A commemorative medal was struck to mark his retirement.

He died in 2000. He had married Patricia Bunford in 1961 and had a son and a daughter.

== Honours and awards ==
- 1961 Elected Fellow of the Society of Antiquaries
- 1974–1978 Elected President of the British Association of Numismatic Societies
- 1986 Elected Fellow of the British Academy
- 1990 Awarded the Silver Medal of Royal Numismatic Society
- 1993 Awarded the Huntington Medal of the American Numismatic Society
- 1984–1990 Elected President of the Royal Numismatic Society
- 1985–1988 Elected President of the London and Middlesex Archaeological Society
- 1986 Member of the Council of the International Numismatic Commission
