= Elizabeth Norton =

British historian

Elizabeth Norton FRHistS
- Born: Elizabeth Anna Norton; 1986 (age 39–40); Steyning, West Sussex, England
- Occupations: Historian and academic

Academic background
- Education: Steyning Grammar School
- Alma mater: New Hall, Cambridge (MA); Hertford College, Oxford (MSc); King's College London (PhD)
- Thesis: The Blount family in the long sixteenth century (2019)
- Doctoral advisor: Hannah Dawson; Lucy Wooding

Academic work
- Institutions: King's College London; Royal Academy of Dramatic Art
- Notable works: She Wolves: The Notorious Queens of England (2008); The Lives of Tudor Women (2017)

Elizabeth Anna Norton FRHistS is a British historian specialising in the queens of England and the Tudor period. She obtained a Master of Arts in archaeology and anthropology from the University of Cambridge, being awarded a Double First Class degree, and a master's degree in European archaeology from the University of Oxford. She is the author of thirteen non-fiction books.

== Biography ==
Norton grew up in Steyning, West Sussex, and attended Steyning Grammar School. She studied archaeology and anthropology at New Hall, Cambridge, and later completed a master's degree in European archaeology at Hertford College, Oxford.

She was a member of a university research group led by Jeremy Keenan to the Algerian Sahara which surveyed prehistoric rock art and travelled with the Tuareg people. The anthropologist Mary Ann Craig was also a member of this group. Norton has also carried out archaeological fieldwork in Hungary.

Her television appearances include Bloody Tales of the Tower (National Geographic), The Book Show (Sky Arts), Flog It! (BBC One) and BBC Breakfast (BBC One). She regularly appears as an expert on BBC London News and is often featured on radio, including The Robert Elms Show on BBC Radio London.

In 2019, she completed a Doctor of Philosophy at King's College London. Her thesis was titled The Blount Family in the long Sixteenth century and she was supervised by Hannah Dawson and Lucy Wooding.

Norton lives in Kingston upon Thames with her husband and sons.

== Published works ==
Elizabeth Norton is the author of thirteen non-fiction works:

- She Wolves, The Notorious Queens of England (The History Press, 2008)
- Anne Boleyn, Henry VIII's Obsession (Amberley, 2008)
- Jane Seymour, Henry VIII's True Love (Amberley, 2009)
- Anne of Cleves, Henry VIII's Discarded Bride (Amberley, 2009)
- Catherine Parr (Amberley, 2010);
- Margaret Beaufort, Mother of the Tudor Dynasty (Amberley, 2010)
- Anne Boleyn, In Her Own Words and the Words of Those Who Knew Her (Amberley, 2011)
- England's Queens: The Biography (Amberley, 2011)
- Bessie Blount: Mistress to Henry VIII (Amberley, 2011) ISBN 9781848688704
- The Boleyn Women: The Tudor Femmes Fatales Who Changed English History (Amberley, 2013) ISBN 9781445640471
- Elfrida: The First Crowned Queen of England (Amberley, 2013) ISBN 9781445614861
- The Tudor Treasury (Andre Deutsch, 2014)
- The Temptation of Elizabeth Tudor (Head of Zeus, 2015)
- The Hidden Lives of Tudor Women – a Social History (Pegasus, 2017)

She is also the author of a number of articles, including

- "Anne of Cleves and Richmond Palace" (Surrey History, 2009)
- "Scandinavian Influences in the Late Anglo-Saxon Sculpture of Sussex" (Sussex Archaeological Collections, 2009).

She regularly writes for history and family history magazines, including BBC History, Who Do You Think You Are? and Your Family Tree.
