= Peter Sherlock =

Australian Vice-Chancellor and historian

Associate Director, Yindyamarra Nguluway, Charles Sturt University
- Incumbent
- Assumed office 2025

Vice-Chancellor of University of Divinity
- In office 2012–2024

Dean of United Faculty of Theology
- In office 2008–2012

Personal details
- Born: Peter Sherlock; 26 October 1972 (age 53)
- Education: University of Melbourne, University of Oxford
- Profession: academic, historian

Peter Sherlock (born 26 October 1972) is an Australian academic based at Charles Sturt University. Sherlock was the inaugural Vice-Chancellor of the University of Divinity in Melbourne, a role he held between 2012 and March 2024. He specialises in the cultural history of Renaissance and Reformation Europe, and is a recognised authority on historic monuments.

== Education ==
Sherlock completed a MA in history at the University of Melbourne. He held a Commonwealth Scholarship at Corpus Christi College, Oxford from 1997 to 2000. His D.Phil thesis from the University of Oxford was titled Funeral Monuments: Piety, Honour and Memory in Early Modern England and was supervised by Clive Holmes. From 2004 to 2008 Sherlock was an Australia Research Council Postdoctoral Fellow in the School of Historical and Philosophical Studies at the University of Melbourne.

== Career ==
Throughout his career Sherlock has made significant contributions to ecumenical theological education and Australian Universities. He served as Dean of the United Faculty of Theology from 2008 to 2012 and was appointed as the inaugural Vice-Chancellor of the University of Divinity in 2012. He has been the Chair of the Council of Deans of Theology since 2015 and Treasurer of the Australian and New Zealand Association for Medieval and Early Modern Studies since 2014. He was elected as President of the Australian and New Zealand Association of Theological Schools in 2022. In 2025, Sherlock was appointed as Associate Director of Yindyamarra Trust at Charles Sturt University, working in collaboration with Distinguished Professor Stan Grant.

Sherlock has also contributed to Australian public theological debate. Between 2013 and 2014 he wrote a column providing religious perspectives on contemporary issues called Theophilus for The Conversation. He has been a guest on several Australian Broadcasting Commission's Radio National programs and also appeared on episodes of The Drum.

Sherlock's contributions to the Anglican Church includes serving as the Lay Canon of St Paul's Cathedral Melbourne from 2010 to 2016. He was editor of the Journal of Anglican Studies from 2020 to 2021. Sherlock he has spoken publicly in favour of the Anglican Church of Australia supporting same-sex marriage. He has been in a long-term same-sex relationship and married his partner in 2018. Sherlock delivered the 48th Barry Marshall Memorial Lecture, 'Why Australia Needs Theology', at Trinity College, Melbourne in 2017.

Sherlock's research explores Renaissance and Reformation Europe history and theology, especially the commemoration of the dead and cultures of remembering and forgetting. He is a recognised authority on historic monuments. He has also published in the areas of gender and religion, on theological education, and contributed multiple entries in the Oxford Dictionary of National Biography.

== Select publications ==
=== Books ===
- Sherlock, Peter (2008) Monuments and Memory in Early Modern England. Ashgate, Aldershot. 296pp. ISBN 9780754660934
- Cassidy-Welch, Megan and Sherlock, Peter (2008) Practices of Gender in Late Medieval and Early Modern Europe. Turnhout: Brepols (Late medieval and early modern studies, v. 11). ISBN 9782503523361

=== Book chapters ===
- Grimshaw, Patricia, and Peter Sherlock (2021) "Women and Cultural Exchanges". In: Critical Readings in the History of Christian Mission (Volume 2). Brill, Leiden, The Netherlands, pp. 600–619. doi:10.1163/9789004399594_012
- Sherlock, Peter (2020) "Monuments and the Reformation". In: Memory and the English Reformation. Cambridge University Press, Cambridge, pp. 168–184. ISBN 9781108900157
- Sherlock, Peter (2019) "Sacred memory: The Elizabethan monuments of Westminster Abbey". In: Historicising Heritage and Emotions : The Affective Histories of Blood, Stone and Land. Routledge, London, pp. 67–83. ISBN 9781315472881
- Sherlock, Peter (2018) "Monuments and Memory". In: A History of Early Modern Women's writing. Cambridge University Press, New York, pp. 292–312. ISBN 9781316480267
- Sherlock, Peter (2017) "The Revolution of Memory: Monuments at Westminster Abbey". In: Revolutionary England, c.1630–c.1660: essays for Clive Holmes. Routledge, London, pp. 201–217. ISBN 9781472438379

=== Journal articles ===
- Sherlock, Peter (2016) The Foundation of the Melbourne College of Divinity. Journal of Religious History, 40 (2). pp. 204–224. doi:10.1111/1467-9809.12279
