= Catherine Schenk =

Canadian historian and academic (born 1964)

Catherine Schenk FRSA FRHistS FAcSS
- Born: Catherine Ruth Schenk; 2 September 1964 (age 62)
- Occupations: Historian and academic
- Title: Professor of Economic and Social History

Academic background
- Education: University of Toronto; London School of Economics
- Doctoral advisor: Alan Milward

Academic work
- Discipline: History
- Sub-discipline: Economic history; Social history; International economics; Sterling area
- Institutions: Victoria University of Wellington; Royal Holloway, University of London; University of Glasgow; St Hilda's College, Oxford

Catherine Ruth Schenk (born 2 September 1964 in Toronto, Canada) is a Canadian economic historian, author and editor. She is a professor of economic and social history at the University of Oxford and a professorial fellow at St Hilda's College. She is an associate fellow at Chatham House.

== Education and career ==
Schenk completed her undergraduate studies in economics at the University of Toronto. She then moved to the London School of Economics to obtain her PhD under the supervision of Alan Milward.

She started her career as a lecturer at Victoria University of Wellington in New Zealand. She then moved to London to be a lecturer at Royal Holloway, University of London.

From 1996 to 2017, she taught at the University of Glasgow, first as a lecturer until 1998, senior lecturer until 2002, reader until 2004 and professor starting in 2004. In 2017, Catherine Schenk was nominated professor at the University of Oxford.

== Research ==
Schenk's research focuses the economic history of post-war Britain. Her work focuses on the decline of the British Empire, its currency and economy. Her first two books focused on the declining role of sterling in the global economy: Britain and the Sterling Area: from Devaluation to Convertibility in the 1950s and The Decline of Sterling: Managing the Retreat of an International Currency, 1945–1992. The first takes the perspective of the sterling area while the second book focuses more broadly on the political and economic context in Britain.

She has also been leading the research agenda on the Eurodollar market, the European dollar lending market which emerged in the 1950s. And another strand of her research focuses on the role Hong Kong played in the global economy.

=== Editorial work ===
Schenk currently serves as managing editor of The Economic History Review.

== Bibliography ==
- Britain and the Sterling Area: From Devaluation to Convertibility in the 1950s (London: Routledge, 1994) ISBN 041509772X
- Hong Kong as an International Financial Centre: Emergence and Development 1945-1965 (London: Routledge, 2001) ISBN 0415205832
- Hong Kong SAR's Monetary and Exchange Rate Challenges: Historical Perspectives (editor; Basingstoke: Palgrave Macmillan, 2009) ISBN 9780230209466
- The Decline of Sterling: Managing the Retreat of an International Currency, 1945-1992 (Cambridge: Cambridge University Press, 2010) ISBN 9780521876971
- International Economic Relations since 1945 (London: Routledge, 2011) ISBN 9780415570763
- The Oxford Handbook of Banking and Financial History (co-editor with Youssef Cassis and Richard S. Grossman; Oxford: Oxford University Press, 2016) ISBN 9780199658626
- Deutsche Bank: The Global Hausbank, 1870-2020 (co-author with Werner Plump and Alexander Nützenadel; London: Bloomsbury Publishing, 2020) ISBN 9781472977328
- Remembering and Learning from Financial Crises (co-editor with Youssef Cassis; New York: Oxford University Press, 2021) ISBN 0192643967
