= Alexandra Gajda =

English historian and academic (born 1979)

Alexandra Gajda FRHistS FSA
- Born: Alexandra Mary Gajda; 4 November 1979 (age 46); Salford, Greater Manchester, England
- Occupations: Historian and academic
- Awards: Sir John Neale Prize for Tudor History

Academic background
- Education: Manchester High School for Girls
- Alma mater: New College, Oxford
- Thesis: Robert Devereux, 2nd earl of Essex and political culture, c.1595–c.1601 (2005)
- Doctoral advisor: Susan Brigden

Academic work
- Discipline: History
- Sub-discipline: Early modern Britain; Political history; Intellectual history; Reformation; History of parliamentarism
- Institutions: St Anne's College, Oxford; University of Birmingham; Jesus College, Oxford

Alexandra Mary Gajda FRHistS FSA (born 4 November 1979) is an English historian of political, religious and intellectual life in early modern Britain. She is associate professor of Early Modern History at the University of Oxford and John Walsh Fellow and Tutor in History at Jesus College.

== Early life and education ==
Gajda was born in Broughton, Salford to parents Norbert and Ann. She was educated at Manchester High School for Girls, where she earned ten A* grades at GCSE.

== Academic career ==
Gajda completed her undergraduate and doctoral studies at New College, Oxford. Her doctoral thesis, an examination of how the career of Robert Devereux, 2nd Earl of Essex shaped late Elizabethan political culture, was supervised by Susan Brigden and completed in 2005. In 2006 she was elected to a Fulford Junior Research Fellowship at St Anne's College, Oxford, before joining the University of Birmingham as a lecturer in Early Modern History in 2007.

Gajda returned to the University of Oxford in October 2011 upon her election to a Tutorial Fellowship in History at Jesus College, succeeding the retiring Felicity Heal. She also holds a lectureship at Worcester College. Gajda took on the additional college offices of Welfare Fellow from 2013 to 2018 and Arts Fellow from 2023 onwards. Between 2015 and 2017 she also served on the Faculty of History's governing board. Her fellowship was made permanent in July 2017. She has served as the vice-chair of the History Faculty board since September 2025.

=== Research ===
Gajda's first monograph, based on her doctoral research, was titled The Earl of Essex and Late Elizabethan Political Culture and was published in 2012 as part of Oxford University Press's Oxford Historical Monographs series. Arthur Williamson's review of the book for The Scottish Historical Review labelled it a "rich and provocative study of the late Elizabethan world" which "will shape any further conversation about the era". Rory Rapple in The Journal of Modern History praised the book as "a very useful study of Essex’s mental world, a net that caught so much of the intellectual richness of its time". Through her work in the book, as well as other related publications, Gajda became known in scholarly circles as "the country's leading expert on the Essex Rebellion", as Jesse Norman described her in 2023.

Her second book was a collection of essays, co-edited with Paul Cavill of Pembroke College, Cambridge, entitled Writing the History of Parliament in Tudor and Early Stuart England. It was published in 2018 by Manchester University Press as part of their Politics, Culture and Society in Early Modern Britain series, of which Gajda is also a general editor. Steven Gunn, reviewing the work for Parliamentary History, stated that the volume makes a "significant contribution" to historical understanding of the role of the past in early modern politics. He further remarked that Gajda's own chapter revealed how Protestants made use of the past to "justify the supremacy of the crown" through "assertions of parliament’s antiquity and power" over the church.

Gajda's current research projects include a study of the role of parliament in shoring up the legitimacy of Protestantism in England and Wales; a study of William Camden's Annales, the first published history of Elizabeth I's reign; a study of early modern English gentlemen's travel and political education; and an edition of the letters of Fulke Greville in collaboration with Henry Woudhuysen.

Gajda also sits on the editorial board of the journal Parliamentary History.

=== Media work ===
Gajda appeared as a guest in a 2023 episode of the BBC Radio 4 programme Great Lives discussing the career of Sir Edward Coke alongside Ian Hislop and Jesse Norman. In 2022 she also appeared on Suzannah Lipscomb's podcast Not Just the Tudors to discuss the final days and legacy of Elizabeth I.

In January 2025 Gajda appeared in an episode of the BBC Two series Lucy Worsley Investigates centred on the Gunpowder Plot, discussing the conspirator Robert Catesby's role in Essex's Rebellion.

Gajda has contributed reviews of early modern history books to Literary Review since 2018. In 2019 she delivered a lecture at Gresham College on the role of its founder Sir Thomas Gresham at the Tudor court.

== Honours and awards ==
In 2006 Gajda was awarded the Sir John Neale Prize for Tudor History by the Institute of Historical Research for her essay 'The State of Christendom: History, Political Thought and the Essex Circle'. In 2013 she was elected a Fellow of the Royal Historical Society. She was also elected a Fellow of the Society of Antiquaries of London in June 2021. She served as an elected council member of the Church of England Record Society from 2017 to 2024.

In 2024, Gajda was photographed as part of an exhibition marking fifty years of coeducation at Jesus College, Oxford. The women in the exhibition were chosen by college members "for their distinctive contribution to the life of our institution, both within and beyond its walls".

== Bibliography ==
=== Books ===
- The Earl of Essex and Late Elizabethan Political Culture (Oxford: Oxford University Press, 2012) ISBN 9780199699681
- Writing the History of Parliament in Tudor and Early Stuart England (co-editor with Paul Cavill; Manchester: Manchester University Press, 2018) ISBN 9780719099588
