= Bibliography of British and Irish History =

The Bibliography of British and Irish History (BBIH) is an electronic bibliography of British and Irish history.

The bibliography covers the Roman period up to the present day including relations with the British Empire and Commonwealth. It is published electronically and was developed from the printed Royal Historical Society Bibliography of British and Irish History. It is usually updated three times per year (February, June and October) and contained just over 600,000 entries by January 2019. It is managed by Brepols Publishers in association with the Royal Historical Society and the Institute of Historical Research. The initial academic editor was Dr Ian Archer of Oxford University; he was succeeded in 2011 by Professor Stephen Taylor of Durham University and he was succeeded in turn by Professor Roey Sweet of the University of Leicester in 2018.
