= Olof von Feilitzen =

Swedish philologist (1908 –1976)

Olof von Feilitzen (31 August 1908 – 29 June 1976) was a Swedish philologist who specialised in Old English names.

== Career ==
Olof von Feilitzen was born on 31 August 1908 and studied at the University of Uppsala, where he taught as a docent in the English Department. He became a member of Professor R. E. Zachrisson's seminar and became a specialist in English onomastics. In 1937, he was awarded a doctorate for his thesis "The Pre-Conquest Personal Names of Domesday Book". He served as Treasurer of the Ortnamnssällskapet i Uppsala [Place Name Society of Uppsala] from 1937 to 1938, when he became a librarian in Gothenborg. He also worked in various positions or as a consultant to the Library of Congress, Yale University Library and the Bibliotheque Sainte-Geneviève. He joined the department of acquisitions at the Royal Library in Stockholm and worked there as its Head for over twenty years before retiring in 1974. He died suddenly on 29 June 1976. At the time of his death, von Feilitzen had been working on a complete Old English Onomasticon, and the University of Nottingham had invited him to take up a special professorship while he worked on the project (he declined the offer for personal and health reasons).

Professor Kenneth Cameron wrote in an obituary for The Times that von Feilitzen "won great acclaim and affection for his outstanding work in the field of early English personal names. His doctoral thesis ... was received by both philologists and medieval historians as the most important study of its kind to date, and it is a tribute to [his] scholarship that it is still today one of our most valuable reference books". He was an honorary vice-president of the English Place-Name Society, of which he was also an honorary council member; in 1973, he was the dedicatee of a festschrift, Otium et Negotium.
