= Felicity Heal =

British historian and academic

Felicity Heal FRHistS FBA
- Born: Felicity Margaret Chandler; 24 September 1945 (age 81)
- Occupations: Historian and academic
- Spouse: Clive Holmes (m. 1988; died 2022)
- Children: 3

Academic background
- Education: Lewes Girls' Grammar School
- Alma mater: Newnham College, Cambridge
- Thesis: The Bishops of Ely and their diocese during the reformation period: ca. 1515–1600 (1971)
- Doctoral advisor: Geoffrey Elton

Academic work
- Discipline: History
- Sub-discipline: Early modern Britain; History of religions; Social history; English Reformation; Scottish Reformation
- Institutions: Newnham College, Cambridge; Open University; University of Sussex; Jesus College, Oxford; Faculty of History, University of Oxford

Felicity Margaret Heal, FRHistS, FBA (born 24 September 1945) is a British historian and academic, specialising in early modern Britain. From 1980 to 2011, she was a lecturer at the University of Oxford and a Fellow of Jesus College, Oxford. She had previously taught or researched at Newnham College, Cambridge, the Open University, and the University of Sussex.

== Early life and education ==
Heal was born on 24 September 1945 in Hemel Hempstead, Hertfordshire, England, to John and Winifred Chandler. She was educated at Lewes Girls' Grammar School, an all-girls state grammar school in Lewes, Sussex. She studied history at Newnham College, Cambridge, graduating with a Bachelor of Arts (BA) degree in 1967 and a Doctor of Philosophy (PhD) degree in 1970. Her doctoral thesis was titled "The Bishops of Ely and their diocese during the reformation period: ca. 1515–1600". Heal's supervisor was the eminent Tudor historian Geoffrey Elton.

== Academic career ==
Heal's main research concerns the late fifteenth to the mid-seventeenth centuries of early modern Britain. She specialises in the religious history, such as the Reformation, and the social history of that era. She also has an interest in gift giving.

From 1970 to 1973, Heal was a research fellow of Newnham College, Cambridge. For the 1975/1976 academic year, she was visiting fellow of Yale University and Stanford University. From 1976 to 1978, she was a staff tutor at the Open University. From 1977 to 1979, she was a lecturer in history at the University of Sussex.

In 1980, Heal was elected a Fellow and Tutor in modern history of Jesus College, Oxford, and appointed a lecturer of the Faculty of History, University of Oxford. She served as Chair of the Faculty of History from 1999 to 2001, and as Deputy Head of the Humanities Division of Oxford University from 2009 to 2011. In 2011, she retired from full-time academia and was appointed Emeritus Fellow of Jesus College, Oxford. She was succeeded in her fellowship by Alexandra Gajda.

Heal led the editorial team responsible for the most recent history of Jesus College, which included R. J. B. Bosworth, Robin Darwall-Smith and Colin Haydon. The history was published in January 2021 in celebration of the 450th anniversary of the college's foundation.

== Personal life ==
Heal has one daughter from her first marriage: Bridget Heal, who is a professor of early modern history at the University of St Andrews. In 1988, she married Clive Holmes, a fellow Oxford historian. She has two step sons from her second marriage.

== Honours ==
Heal is an elected Fellow of the Royal Historical Society (FRHistS). In 2015, she was elected a Fellow of the British Academy (FBA), the United Kingdom's national academy for the humanities and social sciences. She is an honorary professor at the University of St Andrews.

== Selected works ==
- Felicity Heal (1980). Of Prelates and Princes: A Study of the Economic and Social Position of the Tudor Episcopate. Cambridge: Cambridge University Press. ISBN 978-0-521-22950-0.
- Felicity Heal (1990). Hospitality in early modern England. Oxford: Oxford University Press. ISBN 978-0-19-821763-3.
- Felicity Heal; Clive Holmes (1994). The Gentry in England and Wales, 1500-1700. Stanford University Press. ISBN 978-0-8047-2448-7.
- Felicity Heal (2005). Reformation in Britain and Ireland. Oxford: Oxford University Press. ISBN 978-0-19-928015-5.
- Paulina Kewes; Ian W. Archer; Felicity Heal, eds. (2013). The Oxford Handbook of Holinshed's Chronicles. Oxford: Oxford University Press. ISBN 978-0-19-956575-7.
- Felicity Heal (2014). The Power of Gifts: Gift-exchange in Early Modern England. Oxford: Oxford University Press. ISBN 978-0-19-954295-6.
- Felicity Heal; Robin Darwall-Smith; R. J. B. Bosworth; Colin Haydon, eds. (2021). Jesus College Oxford 'of Queene Elizabeth's Foundation' - The First 450 Years (PDF). London: Profile Editions. ISBN 978-1-90-899082-2.
