= Richard Smith (historical geographer) =

Historical geographer

Richard Michael Smith, FBA, FRHistS (born 3 January 1946) is a historical geographer and demographer. He was professor of historical geography and demography at the University of Cambridge from 2003 to 2011, where he is now an emeritus professor, and served as director of the Cambridge Group for the History of Population and Social Structure (1994–2012). He was also a fellow of Downing College, Cambridge, from 1994 to 2010.

== Career ==
Richard Michael Smith was born on 3 January 1946. After completing his undergraduate studies at University College London, he carried out his doctoral studies at St Catharine's College, Cambridge; his PhD was awarded in 1975 for his thesis "English peasant life-cycles and socio-economic networks: a quantitative geographical case study".

After lecturing in population studies at Plymouth Polytechnic for a year, Smith took up an assistant lectureship in historical geography at the University of Cambridge from 1974 to 1976. He then joined the Cambridge Group for the History of Population and Social Structure and was its assistant director for two years from 1981 to 1983. He also joined Fitzwilliam College, Cambridge, as a fellow in 1977, but left in 1983 to take up a fellowship at All Souls College, Oxford; while at All Souls, he was also, initially, a lecturer in population history at the University of Oxford until 1989, when he took up a readership and the directorship of the Wellcome Unit for the History of Medicine at Oxford. He left Oxford in 1994, when he was elected a fellow of Downing College, Cambridge, and appointed director of the Cambridge Group for the History of Population and Social Structure. From 2003 to 2011, he was also professor of historical geography and demography, and was head of the Department of Geography at Cambridge from 2007 to 2010; he retired from his fellowship in 2010 (having been vice-master of Downing College for six years) and from the Group two years later.

Outside of university, Smith served as president of the Economic History Society from 2007 to 2010, and was editor of The Economic History Review from 2001 to 2007.

According to his British Academy profile, Smith's research focuses on "the history of marriage, principally in medieval Europe, peasant inheritance practices and customary law, welfare practices and their demographic correlates in medieval and early modern England and urban historical epidemiology."

== Awards and honours ==
Smith is a Fellow of the Royal Historical Society, and was elected a Fellow of the British Academy (the United Kingdom's national academy for the humanities and social sciences) in 1991.

== Selected publications ==
- (Co-edited with Peter Laslett and Karla Oosterveen) Bastardy and its Comparative History (Edward Arnold, 1981).
- (Edited) Land, Kinship and Life-cycle, Cambridge Studies in Population, Economy and Society in Past Time (Cambridge University Press, 1984).
- (Co-edited with Lloyd Bonfield and Keith Wrightson) The World We Have Gained: Histories of Population and Social Structure (Basil Blackwell, 1986).
- (Co-edited with Margaret Pelling) Life, Death and the Elderly: Historical Perspectives, Routledge Studies in the Social History of Medicine (Routledge, 1991).
- (Co-edited with Zvi Razi) Medieval Society and the Manor Court (Oxford University Press, 1996).
- "Welfare of the individual and the group: Malthus and externalities", American Philosophical Society, vol. 145, no. 4 (2001), pp. 402-414.
