= Vanessa Harding (historian) =

English historian

Vanessa Harding is professor of London history at Birkbeck College, University of London. Her research has focused on death and burial in London and Paris and she has written widely on the subject in academic journals and in book form.

== Career ==
Harding was educated at the University of St. Andrews where she completed her PhD. She became professor of London history at Birkbeck College, University of London in 2009, having joined the college in 1984. In 2008, Harding contributed to the BBC Radio 4 In Our Time series on the Great Fire of London. In 2012, she became general editor of the British Academy Records of Social and Economic History series. She has lectured at Gresham College.

== Research ==
Harding's research relates to the social, economic, and physical history of London from the 14th to the 17th centuries. She has written extensively on death and burial in academic journals and in her book The Dead and the Living in Paris and London, 1500–1670 (Cambridge University Press, 2002).

== Bibliography ==
=== Monographs and books ===
- Keene, Derek; Harding, Vanessa (1985). A survey of documentary sources for property holding in London before the Great Fire. London Record Society publications, v.22. London: London Record Society.
- Harding, Vanessa (1986). Lloyd's at Home. Colchester, Essex: Lloyd's of London. ISBN 978-1-8504-4114-4.
- London Bridge: selected accounts and rentals, 1381–1547, (London Record Society vol. 31, 1995 for 1994) with Laura Wright
- The dead and the living in Paris and London, 1500–1670 (Cambridge University Press, 2002).

=== Articles and chapters ===
- "And one more may be laid there": the location of burials in early modern London', London Journal 14 (1989), pp. 112–29.
- 'The population of London, 1550–1700: a review of the published evidence', London Journal 15 (1990), pp. 111–28.
- 'Burial choice and burial location in later medieval London' in Death in Towns, Urban responses to the dying and the dead, 100–1600, ed. S.R.Bassett (Leicester: Leicester University Press, 1992) pp. 119–35.
- 'Burial of the plague dead in early modern London', in Epidemic disease in London ed. Justin Champion (Centre for Metropolitan History Working Paper Series 1, 1993), pp. 53–64
- 'Cross-channel trade and cultural contacts: London and the Low Countries in the late fourteenth century', in Caroline M. Barron and N.Saul, eds., London and the Low Countries in the late Middle Ages (Alan Sutton, Stroud, 1995), pp. 153–68
- 'Medieval documentary sources for London and Paris: a comparison', in J.Boffey and P. King, eds., London and Europe in the later Middle Ages (Centre for Medieval and Renaissance Studies, Queen Mary and Westfield College, 1995), pp. 35–54
- 'Burial on the margin: distance and discrimination in the early modern city', in M.Cox (ed.), Grave Concerns: death and burial in England, 1700–1850 (York: Council for British Archaeology Research Report 113, 1998), pp. 54–64
- 'Mortality and the mental map of London: Richard Smyth's Obituary', in R.Myers and M.Harris (eds.), Medicine, mortality and the book trade (Cheam: St Paul's Bibliographies, 1998), pp. 49–71.
- 'Citizen and mercer: Sir Thomas Gresham and the social and political world of the city of London', in F. Ames-Lewis (ed.), Sir Thomas Gresham and Gresham College (Aldershot: Ashgate Publishing Ltd., 1999), pp. 24–37.
- 'Reformation and culture in England, Wales and Scotland, 1540–1700', in P. Clark (ed.) Cambridge Urban History of Britain, vol. 2 (Cambridge University Press, 2000), pp. 263–88
- 'Whose body? A study of attitudes towards the dead body in early modern Paris', in B.Gordon and P. Marshall (eds.), The place of the dead. Death and remembrance in late medieval and early modern Europe (Cambridge University Press, 2000), pp. 170–87
- 'Death in the City: mortuary archaeology to 1800', in I Haynes, H. Sheldon, and L. Hannigan, (eds.), London under ground. The Archaeology of London (Oxbow Books, 2000), pp. 272–83
- 'Controlling a complex metropolis, 1650–1750. Politics, parishes and powers', London Journal 26 (2001), pp. 29–37
- 'City, Capital and Metropolis: the Changing Shape of Seventeenth Century London', in J.F.Merritt (ed.), Imagining Early Modern London: Perceptions and Portrayals of the City from Stow to Strype, 1598-1720 (Cambridge University Press 2001), pp. 117–143
- 'Real Estate: Space, Property and Propriety in Urban England' in special issue of Journal of Interdisciplinary History (32.4, Spring 2002) pp. 549–69
- 'Maintaining London Bridge, c. 1380–1550: costs and resources', in Donatella Calabi e Claudia Conforti (eds.), I Ponti: forma e costruzione dall'antico all'architettura del ferro, (Documenti di architettura, Milano, 2002) pp. 1–12
- 'London, Change and Exchange', in H.S.Turner (ed.) The culture of capital: property, cities, and knowledge in early modern England (Routledge, 2002), pp. 129–38
- 'Choices and changes: death, burial and the English Reformation' in The Archaeology of Reformation, 1480–1580, ed. R. Gilchrist and D. Gaimster (Maney Publishing for Society for Medieval Archaeology/Society for Post-Medieval Archaeology, 2003), pp. 386–98.
- 'The Crown, the City and the Orphans: the City of London and its finances, 1400–1700' in Urban public debts, urban government and the market for annuities in Western Europe (14th – 18th centuries), ed. M.Boone, K.Davids, and P.Janssens (Studies in European Urban History 3, Brepols, Turnhout, 2003), pp. 51–60
- 'Employment and opportunity: the building trades in London, 1450–1600', in L'edilizia prima della Rivoluzione Industriale secc. XIII–XVIII: atti della trentaseiesima Settimana di Studi, 2603, Aprile 2004, ed. Simonetta Cavaiocchi (Istituto Internazionale di Storia Economica "F.Datini", Prato: serie II.36, Le Monnier 2005), pp. 991–1011
- 'Shops, markets and retailers in London's Cheapside, c. 1500–1700', in Buyers, sellers and salesmanship in medieval and early modern Europe, ed. B. Blondé, P. Stabel, J. Stobart and I. Van Damme (Studies in European Urban History 9, Brepols, Turnhout, 2006), pp. 155–70
- 'Families and housing in seventeenth-century London', Parergon 24.2 (2007), pp. 115–38.
- 'Cheapside: commerce and commemoration' in Jean E Howard and Deborah Harkness (ed.), The places and spaces of early modern London (special issue of Huntington Library Quarterly 71.1 (2008), 77–96
- 'Names and numbers: gathering and sharing information in early modern London (c. 1500–1700)' and 'Early Modern England and the Written Word', in Koichi Watanabe (ed.) Chu-kinsei Akaibuzu no Takokukan Hikaku / Multilateral Comparative Study on Archives of Medieval and Early Modern Times (2009)
- 'Working wives and economic growth: urban families in the pre-Industrial era', in Il ruolo economico della famiglia, secc. XIII–XVIII, ed. Simonetta Cavaiocchi (Istituto Internazionale di Storia Economica "F.Datini", Prato (2009).
- 'Sons, apprentices, and successors in late medieval and early modern London: the transmission of skills and work opportunities', in F.-E. Eliassen and K. Szende, eds, Generations in towns (Cambridge Scholars Press, 2009)
- 'The last gasp: death and the family in early modern London', in James Kelly and Mary Ann Lyons, eds., Death and dying in Ireland, Britain, and Europe. Historical perspectives (Irish Academic Press, 2013), pp. 77–94
- Harding, Vanessa (November 2013). "Between plague and fire". Today's History. History Today. 63 (11): 41–42.
