= Miriam Zukas =

Academic, writer and researcher

Professor Miriam Zukas
- Occupations: Researcher, writer and academic
- Employer(s): University of Leeds, Birkbeck University of London
- Known for: Research and teaching in adult education

Miriam Zukas is an academic, writer and researcher in the field of adult education and lifelong learning in the UK. Zukas held senior roles at Birkbeck, University of London and University of Leeds.

== Career ==
Her research focuses on pedagogic identities within further, adult, higher, and professional education. She served as a lecturer in the Department of Adult Education at the University of Leicester, head of school and director of the Lifelong Learning Institute at the University of Leeds, and the first Executive Dean of the School of Social Science, History, and Philosophy at Birkbeck University, where she was also a Public Engagement Champion and Fellow.

Zukas retired from her paid academic positions in 2018.

== Research and publications ==
Zukas wrote widely in the area of adult education, learning and work.

She became editor of Studies in the Education of Adults in 2001 (Taylor and Francis). and is the editor or co-editor of many books including: Beyond Reflective Practice: New Approaches to Professional Lifelong Learning,(Routledge, 2009), and the Third International Handbook of Lifelong Learning (Springer, 2023).
