= Caroline Barron =

British retired medieval historian

Caroline Barron OBE
- Born: Caroline Mary Hogarth; 1939 (age 86–87)
- Spouse: John Barron (m. 1962; died 2008)
- Children: 2

Academic background
- Education: Somerville College, Oxford

Academic work
- Discipline: Historian
- Sub-discipline: Medieval history; local history; Late Middle Ages; medieval London
- Institutions: Royal Holloway, University of London

Caroline Mary Barron OBE (née Hogarth; born 7 December 1939) is a retired British medieval historian. She is professor emerita in the department of history at Royal Holloway, University of London. Barron's research relates to "late medieval British history, particularly the history of the City of London, the reign of Richard II and the history of women." She studied at Somerville College, Oxford.

Barron served as president of the London and Middlesex Archaeological Society from 2008 to 2011. She was named president of the British Association For Local History in June 2016, succeeding David Hey.

Barron is an honorary fellow of Somerville College, Oxford and was former president of the Somerville Association.

She was appointed Officer of the Order of the British Empire (OBE) in the 2019 Birthday Honours for services to education.

== Personal life ==
Barron is the granddaughter of David George Hogarth, a noted archaeologist and decorated naval intelligence officer. In 1962, the then Caroline Hogarth married John Barron, a classical scholar and later Master of St Peter's College, Oxford. John Barron died in 2008; they had two daughters.

== Selected publications ==
- Medieval London: Collected Papers of Caroline M. Barron, ed. Martha Carlin and Joel T. Rosenthal. Kalamazoo, Medieval Institute Publications, 2017.
- London in the Later Middle Ages: Government and People 1200-1500. Oxford, Oxford University Press, 2004.
- Pilgrim Souls: Margery Kempe and other Women Pilgrims. London, Confraternity of St James, 2004.
- Hugh Alley's Caveat: the Markets of London in 1598. London Topographical Society, 1988. (with Ian Archer and Vanessa Harding)
- Revolt in London 11th to 15th June 1381. Museum of London, 1981.
- The Parish of St Andrew Holborn: the history of the western suburbs of London from Roman times to the Second World War. London, 1979.
- The Medieval Guildhall of London. Corporation of London, 1974.
