= Centre for Metropolitan History =

English educational organisation

- Abbreviation: CMH
- Formation: 1988
- Location(s): Senate House, London WC1, England
- Director: Professor Matthew Davies
- Parent organisation: IHR, London University
- Website: www.history.ac.uk

The Centre for Metropolitan History (or CMH) is an educational organisation providing resources and training for historical researchers. It is part of the Institute of Historical Research in the School of Advanced Study of the University of London and is located at Senate House.

CMH was founded as a research institute in 1988 by London University and the Museum of London.

== Function of CMH ==
Through its many activities the Centre's core aim is to provide an environment for the support, evaluation and pursuit of research which is accessible to postgraduate, postdoctoral and senior members of all Higher Education institutions in the United Kingdom and internationally.

It promotes the study and wider appreciation of the character and development of the cities of the United Kingdom from early times to the present day and is widely recognised as being the foremost authority on the history of London by setting it in the wider context provided by knowledge of other metropolises.

The mission statement of the Centre for Metropolitan History, set down as follows, is to:

1. Provide a forum for the interchange of ideas on metropolitan history through seminars, conferences and other meetings;

2. Undertake original research into the society, economy, culture and fabric of London, with regard to its role both within the British Isles and in the world at large;

3. Provide a practical service for those interested in the history of London by bibliographical work, by organising raw data so that they are more readily usable, and by collecting and publishing news of research in progress;

4. Promote research into the history of other metropolitan centres by inviting scholars from other parts of the world to take part in its activities, and by undertaking projects which compare London with other centres.

CMH, among London University's other research institutes many of which have long and distinguished histories, provides a large range of specialist research services, facilities and resources.

== See also ==
- Institute of Historical Research
- Museum of London
- Historiography of the United Kingdom
