= Huntington Library Quarterly =

- Discipline: History and Literature
- Language: English
- Edited by: Brett Rushforth

Publication details
- Former name: The Huntington Library Bulletin
- History: 1931
- Publisher: University of Pennsylvania Press for the Huntington Library (United States)
- Frequency: Quarterly

Standard abbreviations
- ISO 4: Huntingt. Libr. Q.

Indexing
- ISSN: 0018-7895 (print); 1544-399X (web)
- JSTOR: huntlibrquar

Links
- Journal homepage; University of Pennsylvania Press Journals; Project MUSE

Huntington Library Quarterly is an official publication of the Huntington Library. It is a quarterly academic journal produced by the Huntington Library and published by University of Pennsylvania Press. The Huntington Library Quarterly (HLQ) is a peer-reviewed journal featuring original research and new perspectives on the early modern period, broadly defined (c. 1400–1800). Its content reflects an early modern world that was connected and cosmopolitan, with diverse communities and cultures increasingly linked by the circulation of people, ideas, social practices, and material objects in ways that transcend disciplinary and geographic boundaries. We invite submissions that draw on the sources, methods, and theoretical frameworks of literature, art, history, science, medicine, material culture, music, performance, and critical cultural studies, with a preference for scholarship that is broadly legible across disciplines.

HLQ’s historical focus on Britain and its American colonies has been dramatically expanded to embrace broader and more diverse fields of inquiry, including scholarship rooted in continental Europe, the African Diaspora, and the Indigenous Americas, as well as their intersections with Mediterranean, Pacific, and Indian Ocean worlds
