= Faculty of History, University of Oxford =

Department of the University of Oxford, England

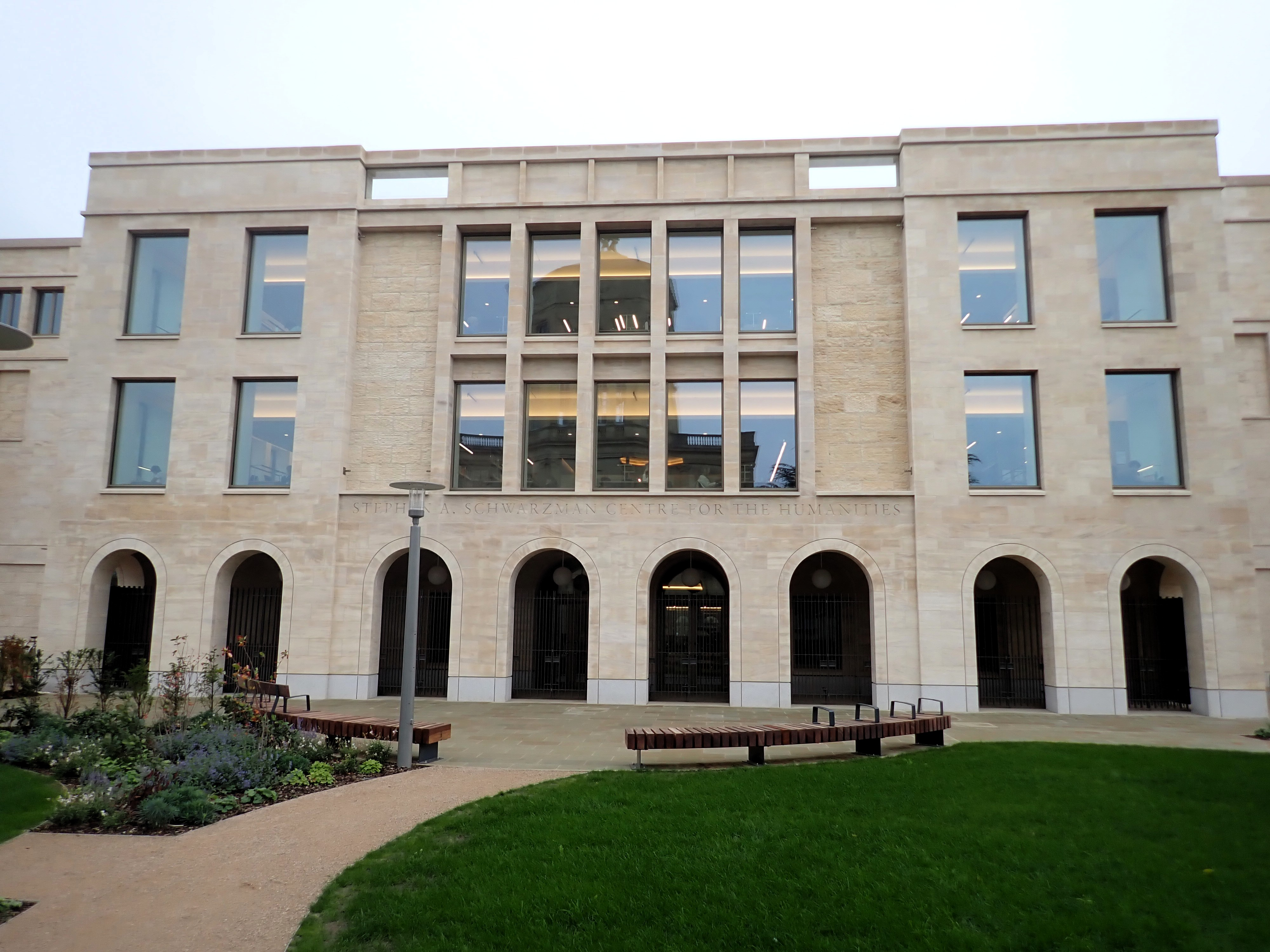
- The Faculty's base since 2025
- Type: History
- Established: 1872
- Founder: William Stubbs
- Parent institution: University of Oxford
- Location: Oxford, England
- Website: www.history.ox.ac.uk

The Faculty of History is an academic department of the Humanities Division at the University of Oxford in Oxford, England, United Kingdom. It focuses on the teaching and research of medieval and modern history.

Medieval and modern history has been taught at Oxford for longer than at virtually any other university, and the first Regius Professor of Modern History was appointed in 1724. The Faculty is part of the Humanities Division, and has been based at the Stephen A. Schwarzman Centre for the Humanities since 2025, while the department's library relocated from the former Indian Institute on Catte Street to the Bodleian Library's Radcliffe Camera in August 2012.

== History ==
In 1850 the school of law and modern history was created by university statute as one of three new degree-granting courses, which could only be taken after completing Literae humaniores or 'Greats'. In 1866 students were allowed to specialise solely in law and modern history. Between 1853, when the first examinations were sat, and 1872, 797 men graduated with such a degree. In the latter year the "uneasy alliance" of law and modern history was dissolved and the two subjects became separated.

William Stubbs, Regius Professor of Modern History, founded the independent school of modern history in 1872, allowing post-classical history to be taught as a distinct subject at the university for the first time. By the time of Stubbs's retirement in 1884, the undergraduate degree in modern history had begun to rival Literae humaniores as the "training ground of the nation's elite". Stubbs's own Select Charters (1870) and three-volume Constitutional History of England (1873–8) spearheaded the curriculum, educating young Englishmen about their "countrymen's long-standing commitment to freedom" and "what was peculiar, precious, and engrained" about being English. Such an education was intended to prepare undergraduates for work as civil servants and imperial administrators. Students were taught via 'authorities', selected extracts of primary sources and works of secondary synthesis which left little room for alternative interpretation. The school's first tutors, having taken their own degrees in Greats and suddenly required to teach a vast corpus of history extending from the fall of the Roman Empire to the end of the eighteenth century, welcomed their use. Stubbs' concentration on medieval English history defined the research and teaching favoured by the faculty for decades to come. In 1883 the board of modern history, which still exists today, was established to oversee the curriculum of the degree, with Stubbs as its inaugural chairman.

In 1886 the faculty cemented its scholarly status with the establishment of its own publishing organ, The English Historical Review, the country's first academic history journal. A decade later in 1896 the faculty began hosting the annual Ford lecture series in English history, Samuel Rawson Gardiner being the first lecturer. By 1901 the faculty was producing more graduates than any other degree course. Until 1913 it was required that all students take classical moderations before advancing to the modern history degree, leaving many undergraduates only two years to complete the entire syllabus. Tutors thus concentrated only on material which could appear in final examinations. The degree was examined solely in this way until 1908 with the introduction of an optional research thesis, though few students took up the offer to produce one initially.

== Organisation ==
As with other departments at the University of Oxford, the Faculty of History is self-governing, being led by a rotating group of its academics. The Chair of the Faculty Board is the head of the History Faculty, who typically serves a three-year term.

=== Chairs of the Faculty Board ===
- 2000–2002: Felicity Heal, Jesus College
- 2002–2004: Christopher Haigh, Christ Church
- 2004–2006: John Robertson, St Hugh's College
- 2006–2009: Christopher Haigh, Christ Church
- 2009–2012: Chris Wickham, All Souls College
- 2012–2015: Jane Humphries, All Souls College
- 2015–2018: Martin Conway, Balliol College
- 2018–2021: John Watts, Corpus Christi College
- 2021–2024: Robert Iliffe, Linacre College
- 2024–present: Martin Conway, Balliol College

=== Endowed chairs ===
The Faculty of History is home to numerous professorships (or chairs), which are typically linked to a particular college. Each endowed chair is listed below alongside their associated college and current postholder.

- Regius Professor of History (Oriel College): Vacant (last held by Lyndal Roper)
- Harold Vyvyan Harmsworth Professor of American History (The Queen's College): Laurie Maffly-Kipp
- Rhodes Professor of American History (St Catherine's College): Jonathan Bell
- Professor of the History of Art (Trinity College): Geoffrey Batchen
- Eleanor Rathbone Professor of Contemporary European History (St Antony's College): Jussi Hanhimäki
- Chichele Professor of Economic History (All Souls College): Sheilagh Ogilvie
- Professor of Economic and Social History (St Hilda's College): Catherine Schenk
- Beit Professor of Global and Imperial History (Balliol College): Faisal Devji
- Professor of Global and Imperial History (Nuffield College): Andrew Thompson
- Foster Professor of Irish History (Hertford College): Ian McBride
- Professor of the History of Medicine (Green Templeton College): Mark Harrison
- Chichele Professor of Medieval History (All Souls College): Alice Rio
- Professor of Modern History (Worcester College): Patricia Clavin
- Professor of the History of Science (Linacre College): Robert Iliffe
- Jonathan Cooper Professor of the History of Sexuality (Mansfield College): Matt Cook
- Chichele Professor of the History of War (All Souls College): Peter H. Wilson
- Hillary Rodham Clinton Professor of Women's History (St John's College): Sarah Knott

== Research groups ==
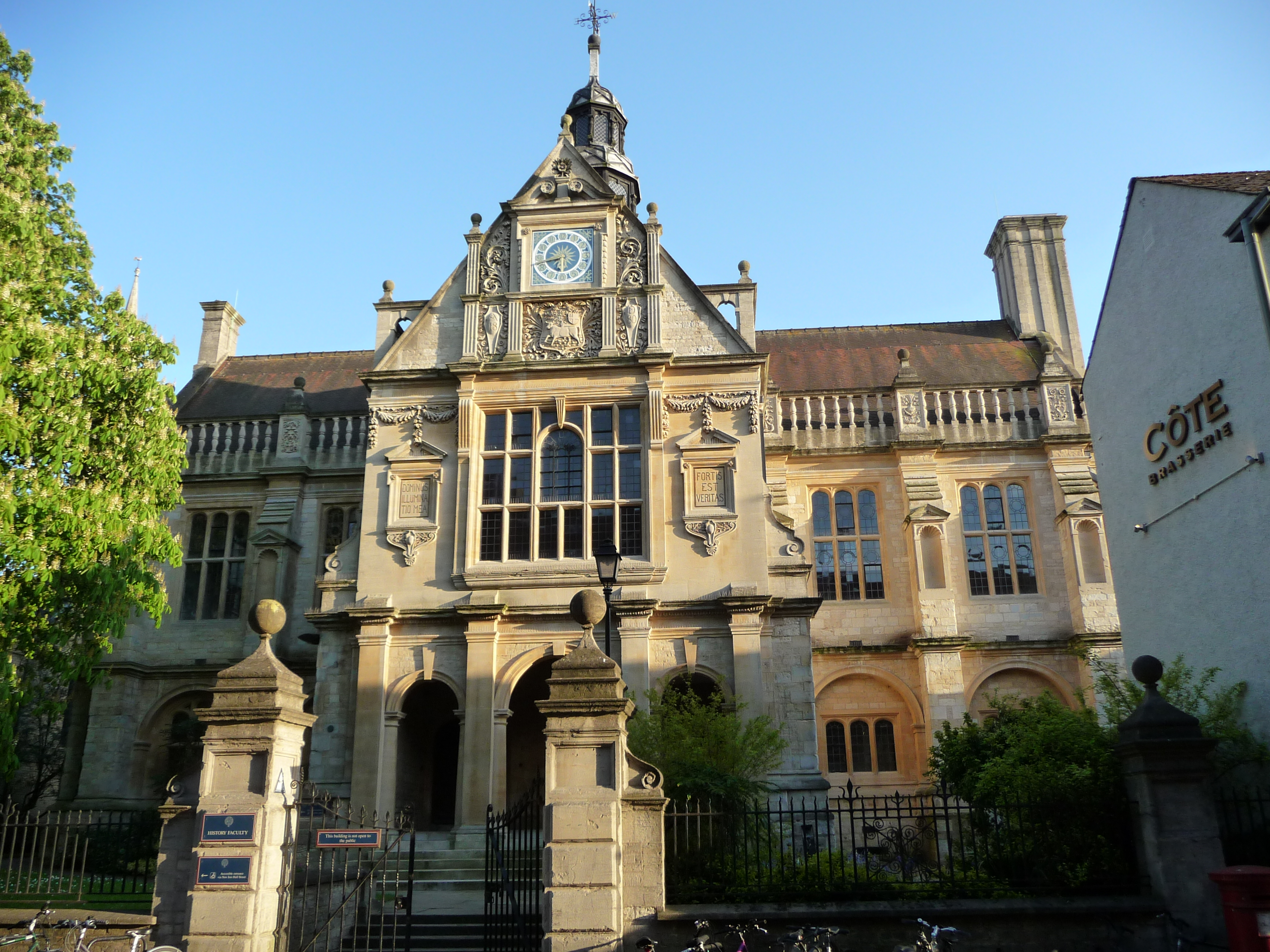
The Faculty's base from 2007 to 2025

- Britain and Europe Group
- Centre for Early Modern British and Irish History
- Centre for the History of Childhood
- Late Antique & Byzantine Studies
- Modern European History Research Centre
- OxCRUSH: Oxford Centre for Research in United States History
- Oxford Centre for Medieval History
- Research Cluster in History of Science, Medicine and Technology
- Wellcome Unit for History of Medicine, Oxford

== Notable academics ==
- Martin Biddle
- John Blair
- Judith M. Brown
- Averil Cameron
- Richard Carwardine
- Thomas Charles-Edwards
- Barry Cunliffe
- Norman Davies
- Robert John Weston Evans
- R. F. Foster
- Timothy Garton Ash
- Robert Gildea
- Pekka Hämäläinen
- Brian Harrison
- Peter Harrison
- Felicity Heal
- Clive Holmes
- Daniel Walker Howe
- Martin Kemp
- Yasmin Khan
- Alan Knight
- Paul Langford
- Sir Colin Lucas
- Diarmaid MacCulloch
- Margaret MacMillan
- Henry Mayr-Harting
- Avner Offer
- Francis Robinson
- Lyndal Roper
- George Rousseau
- Robert Service
- Richard Sharpe
- Paul Slack
- Sir Hew Strachan
- Sir Keith Thomas
- Christopher Wickham
- Blair Worden

== Notable alumni ==
(See also the 'Historians' section of the page List of University of Oxford people in academic disciplines.)

- Clement Attlee, Prime Minister of the United Kingdom
- Matthew d'Ancona, former Editor of the Spectator
- Norman Davies
- Niall Ferguson
- John Gorton, Prime Minister of Australia
- Graham Greene
- Dominic Grieve, Attorney General of the United Kingdom
- Harald V of Norway, King of Norway
- T. E. Lawrence
- George Osborne, Chancellor of the Exchequer
- Michael Palin
- Lester B. Pearson, Prime Minister of Canada
- John Redwood, former Secretary of State for Wales
- Evelyn Waugh
- Andrew Lloyd Webber
- Eric Williams, Prime Minister of Trinidad and Tobago
- Harold Wilson, Prime Minister of the United Kingdom
