= Parliamentary History =

Academic journal

- Discipline: Political science
- Language: English

Publication details
- History: 1982–present
- Frequency: Triannually
- ISO 4: Find out here

Indexing
- ISSN: 0264-2824 (print); 1750-0206 (web)

Links
- Journal homepage

Parliamentary History is a peer-reviewed academic journal that covers the "history of parliamentary institutions in the British Isles". It is published by Wiley.

== Editors ==
The journal's current editors are Paul Cavill (Pembroke College, Cambridge); Linda Clark (The History of Parliament); Richard Gaunt (University of Nottingham); and Hannes Kleineke (The History of Parliament).
