= Oxford Historical Monographs =

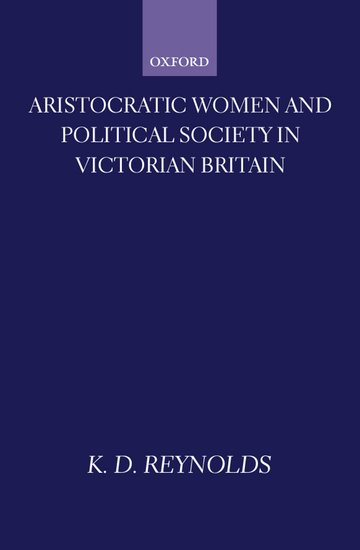
Aristocratic Women and Political Society in Victorian Britain by K.D. Reynolds. A title published in the series in 1998.

Oxford Historical Monographs is a monographic series published by Oxford University Press. All books published in the series are derived from recent doctoral (D.Phil) theses submitted at the University of Oxford.

Since the series received its current name in 1965, over 250 titles have been published. Works are selected by a committee drawn from the university's History Faculty. About 10 percent of theses drawn to their attention are chosen for publication, resulting in 6 to 8 books being published per annum.

== Committee ==
The Oxford Historical Monographs Committee is the series' editorial board and is composed of postholders in the History Faculty at the University of Oxford. It meets four times each year to consider examiners' reports and conduct other business. The committee is intended to represent as wide a range of period and thematic interests as possible. The current (2025) composition of the committee is:

- David Parrott (New College; chair)
- Paul Betts (St Antony's College)
- Faisal Devji (St Antony's College)
- Perry Gauci (Lincoln College)
- Katherine Lebow (Christ Church)
- James McDougall (Trinity College)
- Richard Reid (St Cross College)
- Hannah Skoda (St John's College)
- Julia Smith (All Souls College)
- William Whyte (St John's College)

== List of publications ==
Below is a list of all Oxford Historical Monographs publications in the Oxford University Press catalogue.

Year	Author	Title
1972	Colin Lucas	The Structure of Terror: The Example of Javogues and the Loire
1974	J. S. Morrill	Cheshire 1630–1660: County Government and Society During the 'English Revolution'
1975	Michael Angold	A Byzantine Government in Exile: Government and Society Under the Laskards of Nicaea (1204–1261)
1975	T. C. Barnard	Cromwellian Ireland: English Government and Reform in Ireland 1649–1660
1975	Paul Langford	The Excise Crisis: Society and Politics in the Age of Walpole
1977	I. M. Green	The Re-establishment of the Church of England 1660–1663
1979	D. M. Palliser	Tudor York
1979	Kevin Sharpe	Sir Robert Cotton 1586–1631: History and Politics in Early Modern England
1981	Felipe Fernández-Armesto	The Canary Islands after the Conquest: The Making of a Colonial Society in the Early Sixteenth Century
1983	Nigel Saul	St. Martin and His Hagiographer: History and Miracle in the Sulpicius Severus
1984	Euan Cameron	The Reformation of Heretics: The Waldenses of the Alps, 1480–1580
1984	Anthony Howe	The Cotton Masters 1830–1860
1984	Bryan Ward-Perkins	From Classical Antiquity to the Middle Ages: Urban Public Building in Northern and Central Italy, AD 300-850
1986	Barry Collett	Italian Benedictine Scholars and the Reformation: The Congregation of Santa Giustina of Padua
1986	Andrew Pettegree	Foreign Protestant Communities in Sixteenth-Century London
1987	Richard Brent	Liberal Anglican Politics: Whiggery, Religion, and Reform 1830–1841
1988	John Davis	Reforming London: The London Government Problem, 1855–1900
1988	Linda Bryder	Below the Magic Mountain: A Social History of Tuberculosis in Twentieth-Century Britain
1988	Michael Witby	The Emperor Maurice and His Historian: Theophylact Simocatta on Persian and Balkan Warfare
1988	P. A. Johnson	Duke Richard of York 1411–1460
1989	Michael John	Politics and the Law in Late Nineteenth-Century Germany
1989	Alvin Jackson	The Ulster Party: Irish Unionists in the House of Commons, 1884–1911
1989	Ruth Harris	Murders and Madness: Medicine, Law, and Society in the Fin de Siècle
1989	Azar Gat	The Origins of Military Thought: From the Enlightenment to Clausewitz
1990	David Lemmings	Gentlemen and Barristers: The Inns of Court and the English Bar 1860–1730
1990	Nicholas Tyacke	Anti-Calvinists: The Rise of English Arminianism c.1590–1640
1991	Simon Payling	Political Society in Lancastrian England: The Greater Gentry of Nottinghamshire
1991	Guy Llewelyn Thompson	Paris and Its People Under English Rule: The Anglo-Burgundian Regime 1420–1436
1991	John Wolffe	The Protestant Crusade in Great Britain 1829–1860
1991	Mark Mazower	Greece and the Inter-War Economic Crisis
1991	J. D. Davies	Gentlemen and Tarpaulins: The Officers and Men of the Restoration Army
1991	Lucia Zedner	Women, Crime, and Custody in Victorian England
1991	Peter Heather	Goths and Romans 332–489
1992	S. P. MacKenzie	Politics and Military Morale: Current Affairs and Citizenship Education in the British Army 1914–1950
1992	M. W. Taylor	Men versus the State: Herbert Spencer and Late Victorian Individualism
1992	Philippa C. Maddern	Violence and Social Order: East Anglia 1422–1442
1992	Stephen Brooke	Labour's War: The Labour Party and the Second World War
1992	C. E. Moreton	The Townshends and Their World: Gentry, Law, and Land in Norfolk c.1450–1551
1992	Julian Davies	The Caroline Captivity of the Church: Charles I and the Remoulding of Anglicanism 1625–1641
1992	Teresa Webber	Scribes and Scholars at Salisbury Cathedral c.1075–1125
1992	Nigel Aston	The End of an Élite: The French Bishops and the Coming of the Revolution 1786–1790
1992	Joseph McAleer	Popular Reading and Publishing in Britain 1914–1950
1993	Huw Pryce	Native Law and the Church in Medieval Wales
1993	Robert Harris	A Patriot Press: National Politics and the London Press in the 1740s
1993	Andrew Adonis	Making Aristocracy Work: The Peerage and the Political System in Britain, 1884–1914
1993	David Gary Shaw	The Creation of a Community: The City of Wells in the Middle Ages
1993	Randall Rogers	Latin Siege Warfare in the Twelfth Century
1993	Elizabeth Harvey	Youth and the Welfare State in Weimar Germany
1993	L. V. Scott	Conscription and the Attlee Governments: The Politics and Policy of National Service 1945–1951
1993	Stephen Hpwe	Anticolonialism in British Politics: The Left and the End of Empire 1918–1964
1993	Richard H. Trainor	Black Country Élites: The Exercise of Authority in an Industrialized Area, 1830–1900
1994	Peter Marshall	The Catholic Priesthood and the English Reformation
1994	Peter A. Clarke	The English Nobility under Edward the Confessor
1994	Lara V. Marks	Model Mothers: Jewish Mothers and Maternity Provision in East London 1870–1939
1994	David Eastwood	Governing Rural England: Tradition and Transformation in Local Government 1780–1840
1994	Jeremy Adelman	Frontier Development: Land, Labour, and Capital on the Wheatlands of Argentina and Canada 1890–1914
1994	William G. Wagner	Marriage, Property, and Law in Late Imperial Russia
1994	Mariel Grant	Propaganda and the Role of the State in Inter-War Britain
1994	John Hudson	Land, Law, and Lordship in Anglo-Norman England
1994	Stefan Berger	The British Labour Party and the German Social Democrats 1900–1931
1995	Philip Murphy	Party Politics and Decolonization: The Conservative Party and British Colonial Policy in Tropical Africa 1951–1964
1995	V. Markham Lester	Victorian Insolvency: Bankruptcy, Imprisonment for Debt, and Company Winding-up in Nineteenth-Century England
1995	Fania Oz-Salzberger	Translating the Enlightenment: Scottish Civic Discourse in Eighteenth-Century Germany
1995	Marguerite W. Dupree	Family Structure in the Staffordshire Potteries 1840–1880
1995	Andrew D. Brown	Popular Piety in Late Medieval England: The Diocese of Salisbury 1250–1550
1995	Richard Gameson	The Role of Art in the Late Anglo-Saxon Church
1995	Howard G. Brown	War, Revolution, and the Bureaucratic State: Politics and Army Administration in France, 1791–1799
1995	Mary Heimann	Catholic Devotion in Victorian England
1995	James Meadowcroft	Conceptualizing the State: Innovation and Dispute in British Political Thought 1880–1914
1996	Perry Gauci	Politics and Society in Great Yarmouth 1660–1722
1996	Eduardo Posada-Carbó	The Colombian Caribbean: A Regional History 1870–1950
1996	Sandra M. den Otter	British Idealism and Social Explanation: A Study in Late Victorian Thought
1996	Matthew Cragoe	An Anglican Aristocracy: The Moral Economy of the Landed Estate in Carmarthenshire 1832–1895
1996	Mary Vincent	The Second Spanish Republic: Religion and Politics in Salamanca 1930–1936
1996	Paul Smith	Feminism and the Third Republic: Women's Political and Civil Rights in France, 1918–1945
1996	Anthony Kauders	German Politics and the Jews: Düsseldorf and Nuremberg, 1910–1933
1996	Christian Leitz	Economic Relations between Nazi Germany and Franco's Spain 1936–1945
1997	Andrzej Olechnowicz	Working-Class Housing in England Between the Wars: The Becontree Estate
1997	Christopher Trolley	Domestic Biography: The Legacy of Evangelicalism in Four Nineteenth-Century Families
1997	Ian Bostridge	Witchcraft and Its Transformations, c.1650–c.1750
1997	C. Y. Ferdinand	Benjamin Collins and the Provincial Newspaper Trade in the Eighteenth Century
1997	Rosemary Sweet	The Writing of Urban Histories in Eighteenth-Century England
1997	Daniel Ritschel	The Politics of Planning: The Debate on Economic Planning in Britain in the 1930s
1997	Scott Smith-Bannister	Names and Naming Patterns in England 1538–1700
1997	Arihiro Fukuda	Sovereignty and the Sword: Harrington, Hobbes, and Mixed Government in the English Civil Wars
1998	Patrick Major	The Death of the KPD: Communism and Anti-Communism in West Germant, 1945–1956
1998	Mathew Thomson	The Problem of Mental Deficiency: Eugenics, Democracy, and Social Policy in Britain, c.1870–1959
1998	Richard Butterwick	Poland's Last King and English Culture: Stanislaw August Poniatowski, 1732–1798
1998	K. D. Reynolds	Aristocratic Women and Political Society in Victorian Britain
1998	Colin Podmore	The Moravian Church in England, 1728–1760
1998	Joseph Ziegler	Medicine and Religion c.1300: The Case of Arnau de Vilanova
1998	Rainer Liedtke	Jewish Welfare in Hamburg and Manchester, c.1850–1914
1998	Hannah Barker	Newspapers, Politics, and Public Opinion in Late Eighteenth-Century England
1998	Kathleen G. Cushing	Papacy and Law in the Gregorian Revolution
1999	Ashley Jackson	Botswana 1939–1945: An African Country at War
1999	Alan Coates	English Medieval Books: The Reading Abbey Collections from Foundation to Dispersal
1999	Gábor Bátonyi	Britain and Central Europe, 1918–1933
1999	Maria Misra	Business, Race, and Politics in British India, c.1850–1960
1999	Jan Palmowski	Urban Liberalism in Imperial Germany: Frankfurt Am Main, 1866–1914
1999	Heather Bell	Frontiers of Medicine in the Anglo-Egyptian Sudan, 1899–1940
1999	Carol E. Harrison	The Bourgeois Citizen in Nineteenth-Century France: Gender, Sociability, and the Uses of Emulation
1999	David Wartenweiler	Civic Society and Academic Debate in Russia 1905–1914
1999	Arthur Burns	The Diocesan Revival in the Church of England c.1800–1870
1999	Berenice M. Kerr	Religious Life for Women c.1100–c.1350
1999	Owen White	Children of the French Empire: Miscegenation and Colonial Society in French West Africa 1895–1960
2000	John Crook	The Architectural Setting of the Cult of Saints in the Early Christian West c.300–c.1200
2000	Adrian Davies	The Quakers in English Society, 1655–1725
2000	Howard Hotson	Johann Heinrich Alsted 1588–1638
2000	Jeremy Gregory	Restoration, Reformation, and Reform, 1660–1828
2000	Hugh E. L. Collins	The Order of the Garter 1348–1461: Chivalry and Politics in Late Medieval England
2000	Jane Whittle	The Development of Agrarian Capitalism: Land and Labour in Norfolk 1440–1580
2000	Michael Haren	Sin and Society in Fourteenth-Century England: A Study of the Memoriale Presbiterorum
2000	Rosemary Mitchell	Picturing the Past: English History in Text and Image, 1830–1870
2000	Sarah Stockwell	The Business of Decolonization: British Business Strategies in the Gold Coast
2000	Graeme Murdock	Calvinism on the Frontier, 1600–1660: International Calvinism and the Reformed Church in Hungary and Transylvania
2000	David S. Kerr	Caricature and French Political Culture 1830–1848: Charles Philipon and the Illustrated Press
2000	Mark Hewitson	National Identity and Political Thought in Germany: Whilhelmine Depictions of the French Third Republic, 1890–1914
2000	Conrad Leyser	Authority and Asceticism from Augustine to Gregory the Great
2000	Rosalind Gray	Russian Genre Painting in the Nineteenth Century
2000	Lucy Wooding	Rethinking Catholicism in Reformation England
2001	Roy Hora	The Landowners of the Argentine Pampas: A Social and Political History 1860–1945
2001	John Nightingale	Monasteries and Patrons in the Gorze Reform
2001	Regina Pörtner	The Counter-Reformation in Central Europe: Styria 1580–1630
2001	Trevor Griffiths	The Lancashire Working Classes c.1880–1930
2001	David Wright	Mental Disability in Victorian England
2002	Paul Laity	The British Peace Movement 1870–1914
2002	Paul Robinson	The White Russian Army in Exile 1920–1941
2002	Patricia Londoño-Vega	Religion, Society, and Culture in Colombia: Medellín and Antioquia, 1850–1930
2002	Catherine Koveski Killerby	Samptuary Law in Italy 1200–1500
2002	Suzanne F. Cawsey	Kingship and Propaganda: Royal Eloquence and the Crown of Aragon c.1200–1450
2002	Melissa Fegan	Literature and the Irish Famine 1845–1919
2002	James J. Nott	Music for the People: Popular Music and Dance in Interwar Britain
2002	Stephen Small	Political Thought in Ireland 1776–1798: Republicanism, Patriotism, and Radicalism
2002	Ben Levitas	The Theatre of Nation: Irish Drama and Cultural Nationalism 1890–1916
2003	Patricia Lynch	The Liberal Party in Rural England 1885–1910
2003	Alastair Dunn	The Politics of Magnate Power: England and Wales 1389–1413
2003	J. P. D. Cooper	Propaganda and the Tudor State: Political Culture in the West Country
2003	Julian Wright	The Regionalist Movement in France 1890–1914: Jean Charles-Brun and French Political Thought
2003	Austin Gee	The British Volunteer Movement 1794–1814
2003	Simon J. Potter	News and the British World: The Emergence of an Imperial Press System
2003	Erik Grimmer-Solem	The Rise of Historical Economics and Social Reform in Germany 1864–1894
2003	Holger Hoock	The King's Artists: The Royal Academy of Arts and the Politics of British Culture 1760–1840
2003	Clare Kellar	Scotland, England, and the Reformation 1534–61
2003	Patrick Nold	Pope John XXII and His Franciscan Cardinal
2004	Paul M. Hunneyball	Architecture and Image-Building in Seventeenth-Century Hertfordshire
2004	Cindy McCreery	The Satirical Gaze: Prints of Women in Late Eighteenth-Century England
2004	Till Wahnbaeck	Luxury and Public Happiness: Political Economy in the Italian Enlightenment
2004	Marc Brodie	The Politics of the Poor: The East End of London 1885–1914
2004	Cayetana Álvarez de Toledo	Politics and Reform in Spain and Viceregal Mexico: The Life and Thought of Juan de Palafox 1600–1659
2004	Matthew Grimley	Citizenship, Community, and the Church of England: Liberal Anglican Theories of the State between the Wars
2004	Mark Curthoys	Governments, Labour, and the Law in Mid-Victorian Britain: The Trade Union Legislation of the 1870s
2004	Adrian Bingha,	Gender, Modernity, and the Popular Press in Inter-War Britain
2004	Arne Perras	Carl Peters and German Imperialism 1856–1918: A Political Biography
2004	Amy Ng	Nationalism and Political Liberty: Redlich, Namier, and the Crisis of Empire
2004	Chi-kwan Mark	Hong Kong and the Cold War: Anglo-American Relations 1949–1957
2004	David Harrison	The Bridges of Medieval England: Transport and Society 400–1800
2004	Josie McLellan	Anti-Fascism and Memory in East Germany
2004	S. A. Skinner	Tractarians and the 'Condition of England'
2004	James G. Clark	A Monastic Renaissance at St Albans: Thomas Walsingham and His Circle c.1350–1440
2004	Alan McDougall	Youth Politics in East Germany: The Free German Youth Movement 1946–1968
2005	Martin Mevius	Agents of Moscow: The Hungarian Communist Party and the Origins of Socialist Patriotism 1941–1953
2005	Shirli Gilbert	Music in the Holocaust: Confronting Life in the Nazi Ghettos and Camps
2005	Lauren Kassell	Medicine and Magic in Elizabethan London
2005	Elaine Chalus	Elite Women in English Political Life c.1754–1790
2005	Robert Gerwarth	The Bismarck Myth: Weimar Germany and the Legacy of the Iron Chancellor
2005	Jay Sexton	Debtor Diplomacy: Finance and American Foreign Relations in the Civil War Era 1837–1873
2005	Jens Hanssen	Fin de Siècle Beirut: The Making of an Ottoman Provincial Capital
2005	Julius Ruiz	Franco's Justice: Repression in Madrid After the Spanish Civil War
2005	Martin Porter	Windows of the Soul: Physiognomy in European Culture 1470–1780
2005	Oliver Grant	Migration and Inequality in Germany 1870–1913
2005	Ian Forrest	The Detection of Heresy in Late Medieval England
2005	Troy Bickham	Savages Within the Empire: Representations of American Indians in Eighteenth-Century Britain
2006	S. Ravi Rajan	Modernizing Nature: Forestry and Imperial Eco-Development 1800–1950
2006	Simon Yarrow	Saints and Their Communities: Miracle Stories in Twelfth-Century England
2006	Elisabeth Kontogiorgi	Population Exchange in Greek Macedonia
2006	Dirk Spilker	The East German Leadership and the Division of Germany
2006	William Whyte	Oxford Jackson: Architecture, Education, Status, and Style 1835–1924
2006	Zoe Vania Waxman	Writing the Holocaust: Identity, Testimony, Representation
2007	Kitty Hauser	Shadow Sites: Photography, Archaeology, and the British Landscape 1927–1955
2007	Martin Bunton	Colonial Land Policies in Palestine 1917–1936
2007	Clare V. J. Griffiths	Labour and the Countryside: The Politics of Rural Britain 1918–1939
2007	Andrew Crawley	Somoza and Roosevelt: Good Neighbour Diplomacy in Nicaragua, 1933–1945
2007	Nicholas Owen	The British Left and India: Metropolitan Anti-Imperialism, 1885–1947
2007	James Onley	The Arabian Frontier of the British Raj: Merchants, Rulers, and the British in the Nineteenth-Century Gulf
2007	Stephen Baxter	The Earls of Mercia: Lordship and Power in Late Anglo-Saxon England
2008	Julia von Dannenberg	The Foundations of Ostpolitik: The Making of the Moscow Treaty Between West Germany and the USSR
2008	Matthew Frank	Expelling the Germans: British Opinion and Post–1945 Population Transfer in Context
2008	Dimitris Livanios	The Macedonian Question: Britain and the Southern Balkans 1939–1949
2008	Brock Holden	Lords of the Central Marches: English Aristocracy and Frontier Society, 1087–1265
2008	Christopher Fletcher	Richard II: Manhood, Youth, and Politics 1377–99
2008	Alexander Morrison	Russian Rule in Samarkand 1868–1910
2008	Christopher Harding	Religious Transformation in South Asia: The Meanings of Conversion in Colonial Punjab
2009	Katrina Navickas	Loyalism and Radicalism in Lancashire, 1798–1815
2009	Michael Clark	Albion and Jerusalem: The Anglo-Jewish Community in the Post-Emancipation Era 1858–1887
2009	Nicholas Dew	Orientalism in Louis XIV's France
2009	P.R. Cavill	The English Parliaments of Henry VII 1485–1504
2009	Anna von der Goltz	Hindenburg: Power, Myth, and the Rise of the Nazis
2009	Hester Barron	The 1926 Miners' Lockout: Meanings of Community in the Durham Coalfield
2010	P. L. Pham	Ending 'East of Suez': The British Decision to Withdraw from Malaysia and Singapore 1964–1968
2010	Monika Baár	Historians and Nationalism: East-Central Europe in the Nineteenth Century
2010	Tracey A. Sowerby	Renaissance and Reform in Tudor England: The Careers of Sir Richard Morison c.1513–1556
2010	T.K. Wilson	Frontiers of Violence: Conflict and Identity in Ulster and Upper Silesia 1918–1922
2011	Stuart Eagles	After Ruskin: The Social and Political Legacies of a Victorian Prophet, 1870–1920
2011	Damon Ieremia Salesa	Racial Crossings: Race, Intermarriage, and the Victorian British Empire
2011	Timothy Johnston	Being Soviet: Identity, Rumour, and Everyday Life Under Stalin 1939–1953
2011	Satoshi Mizutani	The Meaning of White: Race, Class, and the 'Domiciled Community' in British India 1858–1930
2011	Helen Jacobsen	Luxury and Power: The Material World of the Stuart Diplomat, 1660–1714
2011	Stephan E. C. Wendehorst	British Jewry, Zionism, and the Jewish State, 1936–1956
2012	Robert Tobin	The Minority Voice: Hubert Butler and Southern Irish Protestantism, 1900–1991
2012	Alexandra Gajda	The Earl of Essex and Late Elizabethan Political Culture
2012	Eric Jabbari	Pierre Laroque and the Welfare State in Postwar France
2012	James Matthews	Reluctant Warriors: Republican Popular Army and Nationalist Army Conscripts in the Spanish Civil War, 1936–1939
2012	Avi Lifschitz	Language and Enlightenment: The Berlin Debates of the Eighteenth Century
2012	Leigh A. Gardner	Taxing Colonial Africa: The Political Economy of British Imperialism
2013	Hannah Skoda	Medieval Violence: Physical Brutality in Northern France, 1270–1330
2013	Miles Pattenden	Pius IV and the Fall of the Carafa: Nepotism and Papal Authority in Counter-Reformation Rome
2013	Joshua L. Cherniss	A Mind and Its Time: The Development of Isaiah Berlin's Political Thought
2013	Rebecca Clifford	Commemorating the Holocaust: The Dilemmas of Remembrance in France and Italy
2013	Erika Hanna	Modern Dublin: Urban Change and the Irish Past, 1957–1973
2013	Abdel Razzaq Takriti	Monsoon Revolution: Republicans, Sultans, and Empires in Oman, 1965–1976
2013	Michael P.M. Finch	A Progressive Occupation? The Gallieni-Lyautey Method and Colonial Pacification in Tonkin and Madagascar, 1885–1900
2013	Holger Nehring	Politics of Security: British and West German Protest Movements and the Early Cold War, 1945–1970
2014	Lucie Ryzova	The Age of the Efendiyya: Passages to Modernity in National-Colonial Egypt
2014	Stephen J. C. Andes	The Vatican and Catholic Activism in Mexico and Chile: The Politics of Transnational Catholicism, 1920–1940
2014	Britta Schilling	Postcolonial Germany: Memories of Empire in a Decolonized Nation
2014	Simone Laqua-O'Donnell	Women and the Counter-Reformation in Early Modern Münster
2014	Daniel Lee	Pétain's Jewish Children: French Jewish Youth and the Vichy Regime, 1940–1942
2014	Kathryne Beebe	Pilgrim & Preacher: The Audiences and Observant Spirituality of Friar Felix Fabri (1437/8–1502)
2014	Peter Sloman	The Liberal Party and the Economy, 1929–1964
2014	Andrew D. M. Beaumont	Colonial America and the Earl of Halifax, 1748–1761
2015	Robert S. G. Fletcher	British Imperialism and 'The Tribal Question'
2015	Robert D. Priest	The Gospel According to Renan: Reading, Writing, and Religion in Nineteenth-Century France
2015	Amalia Ribi Forclaz	Humanitarian Imperialism: The Politics of Anti-Slavery Activism, 1880–1940
2015	Kat Hill	Baptism, Brotherhood, and Belief in Reformation Germany: Anabaptism and Lutheranism, 1525–1585
2015	Benedict Wagner-Rundell	Common Wealth, Common Good: The Politics of Virtue in Early Modern Poland-Lithuania
2015	Patrick Lantschner	The Logic of Political Conflict in Medieval Cities: Italy and the Southern Low Countries, 1370–1440
2015	Aaron Graham	Corruption, Party, and Government in Britain, 1702–1713
2015	Frances Flanagan	Remembering the Revolution: Dissent, Culture, and Nationalism in the Irish Free State
2015	Thomas Marsden	The Crisis of Religious Toleration in Imperial Russia: Bibikov's System for the Old Believers, 1841–1855
2016	James Kirby	Historians and the Church of England: Religion and Historical Scholarship, 1870–1920
2016	Gerard Keown	First of the Small Nations: The Beginnings of Irish Foreign Policy in the Inter-War Years, 1919–1932
2016	Mara van der Lugt	Bayle, Jurieu, and the Dictionnaire Historique et Critique
2016	Oren Margolis	The Politics of Culture in Quattrocento Europe: René of Anjou in Italy
2016	Andrew S. Tompkins	Better Active Than Radioactive! Anti-Nuclear Protest in 1970s France and West Germany
2016	Antoninus Samy	The Building Society Promise: Access, Risk, and Efficiency 1880–1939
2016	Benjamin Mountford	Britain, China, and Colonial Australia
2016	Alistair Malcolm	Royal Favouritism and the Governing Elite of the Spanish Monarchy, 1640–1665
2017	Emily Jones	Edmund Burke and the Invention of Modern Conservatism, 1830–1914
2017	Aled Davies	The City of London and Social Democracy: The Political Economy of Finance in Britain, 1959–1979
2017	G.E.M. Lippiatt	Simon V of Montfort and Baronial Government, 1195–1218
2017	Britan FitzGerald	Inspiration and Authority in the Middle Ages: Prophets and Their Critics from Scholasticism to Humanism
2017	Emily A. Winkler	Royal Responsibility in Anglo-Norman Historical Writing
2018	Sam Brewitt-Taylor	Christian Radicalism in the Church of England and the Invention of the British Sixties, 1957–1970: The Hope of a World Transformed
2018	Duncan Hardy	Associative Political Culture in the Holy Roman Empire: Upper Germany, 1346–1521
2018	Kenneth Owen	Political Community in Revolutionary Pennsylvania, 1774–1800
2018	Thomas Brodie	German Catholicism at War, 1939–1945
2019	Joshua Bennett	God and Progress: Religion and History in British Intellectual Culture, 1845–1914
2019	Mary Elisabeth Cox	Hunger in War and Peace: Women and Children in Germany, 1914–1924
2019	Arthur Asseraf	Electric News in Colonial Algeria
2019	Eliza Hartrich	Politics and the Urban Sector in Fifteenth-Century England, 1413–1471
2019	Anish Vanaik	Possessing the City: Property and Politics in Delhi, 1911–1947
2020	Gabriela A. Frei	Great Britain, International Law, and the Evolution of Maritime Strategic Thought, 1856–1914
2020	Yoni Furas	Educating Palestine: Teaching and Learning History Under the Mandate
2020	Floris Verhaart	Classical Learning in Britain, France, and the Dutch Republic, 1690–1750
2020	Lise Butler	Michael Young, Social Science, and the British Left, 1945–1970
2021	Lidia Luisa Zanetti Domingues	Confession and Criminal Justice in Late Medieval Italy: Siena, 1260–1330
2021	Lyndsey Jenkins	Sisters and Sisterhood: The Kenney Family, Class, and Suffrage, 1890–1965
2022	Ria Kapoor	Making Refugees in India
2022	R. J. C. Adams	Shadow of a Taxman: Who Funded the Irish Revolution?
2022	Neal Shashore	Designs on Democracy: Architecture and the Public in Interwar London
2023	Thomas Pert	The Palatine Family and the Thirty Years' War: Experiences of Exile in Early Modern Europe, 1632–1648
2023	Aaron Clift	Anticommunism in French Society and Politics, 1945–1953
2023	Graham Barrett	Text and Textuality in Early Medieval Iberia: The Written and the World, 711–1031
2023	Luca Zenobi	Borders and the Politics of Space in Late Medieval Italy
2023	Benjamin Savill	England and the Papacy in the Early Middle Ages: Papal Privileges in European Perspective, c.680–1073
2023	Amar Sohal	The Muslim Secular: Parity and the Politics of India's Partition
2023	Lorenzo Tabarrini	Estate Management Around Florence and Lucca 1000–1250
2023	Roshan Allpress	British Philanthropy in the Globalizing World: Entrepreneurs and Evangelicas, 1756–1840
2024	Matthew Ward	Thomas Hobbes and Political Thought in Ireland c.1660–c.1730: The Leviathan Released
2024	Cynthia Aalders	The Spiritual Lives and Manuscript Cultures of Eighteenth-Century English Women: Writing Religious Communities
2025	Matt Myers	The Halted March of the European Left: The Working Class in Britain, France, and Italy, 1968–1989
2025	Matthew Woolgar	Communism, Cold War, and Revolution: The Indonesian Communist Party in West Java, 1949–1966
2025	Kevin Noles	Indian Prisoners of War in Japanese Captivity during World War Two
2026	M. J. M. Innes	Politics, Polemic, and Political Thought during the French Wars of Religion: The Life of Pierre de Belloy, c.1550–1611
2026	Marilena Anastasopoulou	A Century of Asia Minor Refugees in Greece: Flight, Fight, and Fraternity
2026	Tess Little	Transnational Women's Liberation: Feminist Activism in the US, UK, and France, 1967–79
