= Conrad Leyser =

English medieval historian (born 1963)

- Born: Charles Conrad Leyser; 1963 (age 62–63)
- Occupations: Historian and academic
- Spouse: Kate Cooper
- Children: 2
- Parent(s): Henrietta and Karl Leyser
- Relatives: Ottoline Leyser (sister)

Academic background
- Education: Magdalen College School, Oxford
- Alma mater: Merton College, Oxford
- Thesis: The monastic culture and thought of Pope Gregory the Great in their Western context, c.400–604 (1991)
- Doctoral advisor: Henry Mayr-Harting
- Influences: Robert Austin Markus

Academic work
- Discipline: History
- Sub-discipline: Christianity in late antiquity; History of religion; Social history; Gender history; Christian monasticism; Legal history of the Catholic Church
- Institutions: Columbia University; Wellesley College; University of Manchester; Worcester College, Oxford

Charles Conrad Leyser (born 1963) is an English historian who researches the religious and social history of western Europe and North Africa in late antiquity. He is an associate professor of medieval history at the University of Oxford and fellow and tutor in history at Worcester College.

== Early life and education ==
Leyser was born in 1963 as the eldest child of Henrietta and Karl Leyser, both medieval historians at the University of Oxford. At the time of Leyser's birth, his father held a tutorial fellowship at Magdalen College. He has three siblings: Ottoline, Crispin and Matilda. He is of German Jewish descent from his father.

Leyser was educated at Magdalen College School in Oxford. He commenced his undergraduate studies at Merton College, Oxford in 1982, graduating with a first-class degree in modern history in 1985. In the midst of his studies, in 1984, Leyser's father was elected to the Chichele Chair in Medieval History at All Souls College and his mother published her first monograph, Hermits and the New Monasticism. Leyser continued on to a DPhil supervised by Henry Mayr-Harting and completed in 1991, which focused on Gregory the Great and early Christian monasticism.

Leyser was first interested in the High Middle Ages during his undergraduate degree, a "bizarrely natural" choice given his parents' interests, but in his third year he was "converted" to late antiquity after taking a special subject paper on Augustine of Hippo. Such a study helped Leyser understand that "everything that is there in the eleventh and twelfth centuries came from somewhere. The cult of the saints, monasticism, clerical hierarchy — all of these are formed in that late Roman period", and he sought to focus on the origins of these Christian practices for his doctorate.

== Academic career ==
After earning his doctorate Leyser taught successively at Columbia University (where he was a member of the Society of Fellows), Wellesley College and the University of Manchester. He joined Worcester College, Oxford in succession to Peter Heather in 2008. He also teaches at Jesus College.

=== Research ===
==== Monographs ====
Leyser's first monograph, based on his doctoral thesis, was entitled Authority and Asceticism from Augustine to Gregory the Great. It was published by Oxford University Press as part of their Oxford Historical Monographs series in 2000. Felice Lifshitz, reviewing the work for History, praised Leyser for his "especially innovative" reading of Gregory the Great as a man "jostling for power in the shadow of the Eschaton". For Lifshitz this contrasted with previous scholarship on Gregory which framed him as a monastic figure, being the first monk to become bishop of Rome.

George E. Demacopoulos, reviewing Authority and Asceticism for Theological Studies, recognised the influence of Robert Austin Markus on Leyser's thought in the monograph. For Markus, western Christendom experienced an "ascetic invasion" in the fifth and sixth centuries which signalled the "end of ancient Christianity". Demacopoulos states that Leyser develops the connection Markus made by engaging with Italian monastic rules and the work of Julianus Pomerius, thereby mapping "the many diverse trails leading from Augustine and Cassian to Gregory". Like Lifshitz, Demacopoulos also singles out Leyser's treatment of Gregory for "providing what few before him have — a synthetic presentation of a complex figure".

Leyser's current monograph project explores clerical celibacy and the professionalisation of the priesthood in the 'unreformed' tenth-century church.

==== Edited collections ====
Leyser has also co-edited three volumes of essays focused on the Latin west in late antiquity and the medieval period. The first, England and the Continent in the Tenth Century, was co-edited with David Rollason and Hannah Williams and published by Brepols in 2010. The work was dedicated to Wilhelm Levison, "one of the legendary giants of twentieth-century historical scholarship" and positioned as a spiritual successor to his England and the Continent in the Eighth Century, a "canonical" contribution to medieval scholarship. As Leyser noted in the book's introduction, the volume sought to fulfil unrealised conversations between Rollason and Karl Leyser about scholarly commemorations for Levison in the 1980s. Daniel Anlezark praised the collection as "essential reading for any student of the period".

Leyser's second edited volume was published in 2011 by Ashgate. Titled Motherhood, Religion, and Society in Medieval Europe, 400–1400, it was co-edited with Lesley Smith and dedicated to Leyser's mother Henrietta. The volume's focus was described as "the paradox of motherhood in the European Middle Ages: to be a mother is at once to hold great power, and by the same token to be acutely vulnerable". Elisabeth van Houts, writing for The English Historical Review, praised the editors and contributors for producing "a book that on every page has something interesting and new to say about the varied lives of mothers" in the medieval period. Leyser's own contribution was described as "a tour de force" which "offers an impressive tribute to his own mother in a wide-ranging study of the role of the Virgin Mary for the period prior to the twelfth-century Renaissance when Mary’s cult took off spectacularly".

Leyser's most recent edited collection, Making Early Medieval Societies: Conflict and Belonging in the Latin West, 300–1200, was co-edited with his wife Kate Cooper. It was published by Cambridge University Press in 2016. Influenced by the work of Mary Douglas, to whom the volume is dedicated in memoriam, the work's social anthropological inspiration is identified in Leyser's introduction. Focusing on the "basic question of social order" rather than governmental power, the volume sought to move towards "a history where the rise and fall of systems of government is the symptom, not the cause of wider shifts in social order" in the medieval period. Michael E. Stewart in the Journal of Social History offered high praise for the book: "Deftly interweaving disparate methods, time-periods, and regions, the monograph produces a fresh vision of a millennium of Western European history". Leyser's "particularly revelatory" chapter on Pope Gregory I indicated, for Stewart, "how the actual Gregory differed from the created Gregory" authored by the medieval churchmen who succeeded him and "sifted through the bishop’s writings to mold a Gregory that best suited their contemporary needs".

==== Editorial roles ====
In February 2020, Leyser joined the inaugural editorial board of the monograph series 'Studies in Medieval and Early Modern Belief and Culture' by Liverpool University Press.

=== Media work ===
In August 2015 Leyser appeared in a podcast for the Historical Association discussing the life of Augustine of Hippo. In January 2019 he appeared in an episode of the BBC Radio 4 series The Long View with Jonathan Freedland, comparing the reforming ambitions of Pope Gregory VII with those of Crown Prince Mohammed bin Salman.

In November 2020 Leyser appeared in a podcast for the Oxford Centre for Research in the Humanities as part of a panel discussing Judith Herrin's book Ravenna: Capital of Empire, Crucible of Europe alongside Averil Cameron and Peter Frankopan.

=== Honours and awards ===
In 2007, while teaching at the University of Manchester, Leyser was awarded an Arts and Humanities Research Council research grant for the project 'Memory, 'Corruption', and Reform: The Roman Church, 860–960'.

== Personal life ==
Leyser is married to Kate Cooper, a fellow historian of late antiquity who teaches at Royal Holloway, University of London. They have two daughters.

=== Politics ===
In September 2011, while a member of the Oxford University Campaign for Higher Education, Leyser was one of the signatories to an 'alternative white paper' defending the public value of universities in the wake of the coalition government's white paper recommending drastic changes to the higher education system. In a debate on the subject at a meeting of the University of Oxford's Congregation in June 2011, Leyser said:

The cut to the teaching of humanities and social sciences combined with the explicit expectation that new private providers will come onto the higher education market, subverts the basis on which wisdom has been exchanged for centuries, if not millennia. As these providers start indeed to appear and the mechanics of franchising out the right to grant degrees are thought out, or not thought out, the very rationale for universities is undermined by the minister responsible for them.

The debate ended in members of Congregation reaching an almost unanimous vote of no confidence in the policies of David Willetts, the then-Minister of State for Universities, Science and Cities.

== Bibliography ==
- Authority and Asceticism from Augustine to Gregory the Great (Oxford: Clarendon Press, 2000) ISBN 9780198208686
- England and the Continent in the Tenth Century: Studies in Honour of Wilhelm Levison (1876–1947) (co-editor with David Rollason and Hannah Williams; Turnhout: Brepols, 2010) ISBN 9782503532080
- Motherhood, Religion and Society in Medieval Europe, 400–1400: Essays Presented to Henrietta Leyser (co-editor with Lesley Smith; Farnham: Ashgate Publishing, 2011) ISBN 9781409431459
- Making Early Medieval Societies: Conflict and Belonging in the Latin West, 300–1200 (co-editor with Kate Cooper; Cambridge: Cambridge University Press, 2016) ISBN 9781107138803
