= Robert Markus =

Robert Markus may refer to:

- Robert Markuš (born 1983), Serbian chess player
- Robert Austin Markus (1924–2010), British historian
