= Communications of the Lunar and Planetary Laboratory =

- Discipline: Astronomy
- Language: English

Publication details
- History: 1962-1973
- Publisher: University of Arizona Press (United States)
- Open access: Yes

Standard abbreviations
- ISO 4: Commun. Lunar Planet. Lab.

Indexing
- CODEN: AULCBY
- ISSN: 0099-6416
- LCCN: 62063619
- OCLC no.: 1188055

Links
- Journal homepage

The Communications of the Lunar and Planetary Laboratory was a monographic series that ran from 1962 to 1973 and covered publications and reports by the staff of the Lunar and Planetary Laboratory.

The series is indexed and abstracted in GeoRef and Inspec.
