= Christopher Harding =

Cultural historian

Dr Christopher Harding (born July 1978) is a cultural historian of modern India and Japan, lecturer in Asian history at the University of Edinburgh, broadcaster and journalist. His series on culture and mental health, The Borders of Sanity, was broadcast on BBC Radio 4 and the BBC World Service in 2016.

Harding's book, The Japanese: A History in Twenty Lives, was included in The Times' best history books of the year 2020.

== Selected publications ==
- Religious Transformation in South Asia: the Meanings of Conversion in Colonial Punjab. Oxford University Press, Oxford, 2008. (Oxford Historical Monographs)
- Religion and Psychotherapy in Modern Japan, Routledge, 2014. (Editor)
- Bukkyou Seishin Bunseki: Kosawa Heisaku-sensei wo kataru, [Nagao, Harding & Ikuta (co-authors)]. Kongo Shuppan, 2016.
- "Historical Reflections on Madness", in White, Read, Jain & Orr, The Palgrave Handbook of Global Mental Health: Socio-Cultural Perspectives, Palgrave, 2016.
- Japan Story: In Search of a Nation, 1850 to the Present, Penguin Books, 2018.
- The Japanese: A History in Twenty Lives, Penguin Books, 2022.
- The Light of Asia: A History of Western Fascination with the East, Penguin Books, 2025.
