= K. D. Reynolds =

Historian

Academic background
- Education: Doctor of Philosophy
- Alma mater: University of Oxford
- Thesis: Aristocratic women and political society in early- and mid-Victorian Britain (1995)

Academic work
- Era: Victorian era

K. D. Reynolds is a historian who specialises in the Victorian era. She earned her D.Phil. at the University of Oxford, where in 1995 she completed her thesis under the title "Aristocratic women and political society in early- and mid-Victorian Britain". She was a Research Editor from 1993 until 2004 for the New Dictionary of National Biography. She has contributed or revised approximately 259 articles for the online edition of the Oxford Dictionary of National Biography. Subjects have included Queen Victoria and Diana, Princess of Wales.

As part of its Oxford Historical Monographs series, the Oxford University Press published her doctoral thesis in 1998 under the title Aristocratic Women and Political Society in Victorian Britain. Reynolds described her work as "an examination of... the aristocratic women of the first two-thirds of Victoria's reign, and the ways in which they exercised power and authority within the constraints of a patriarchal society". In her review of Reynolds' book, the historian Philippa Levine wrote, "Well written, meticulously evidenced, and brave, this is an important study that will be read fruitfully by a wide range of historians".

== Select bibliography ==
- Reynolds, K. D. (1996). "Politics Without Feminism: The Victorian Political Hostess". In Campbell Orr, Clarissa (ed.). Wollstonecraft's Daughters: Womanhood in England and France, 1780-1920. Manchester University Press. pp. 94–108. ISBN 0-7190-42410.
- Reynolds, K. D. (1998). Aristocratic Women and Political Society in Victorian Britain. Clarendon Press. ISBN 0-19-820727-1.
