= Henrietta Leyser =

British historian

Henrietta Leyser FRHistS
- Born: Henrietta Bateman
- Spouse: Karl Leyser (m. 1962; died 1992)
- Children: 4, including Conrad and Ottoline

Academic work
- Discipline: Historian
- Sub-discipline: Middle Ages; History of women
- Institutions: St Peter's College, Oxford

Henrietta Leyser (née Bateman) is an English historian. She is an expert on the history of medieval England, in particular the role of women.

== Career ==
Leyser is an Emeritus Fellow at St Peter's College, Oxford, and a Fellow of the Royal Historical Society. She joined St Peter's College in 1996 as Supernumerary Fellow in Medieval History, becoming an Official Fellow in 2002 and a Senior Research Fellow in 2008 before retiring in 2011. During her time at the college she additionally served as Tutor for Admissions between 1998 and 2008 and as Tutor for Welfare between 2004 and 2011.

Leyser was W. John Bennett Distinguished Visiting Scholar at the Institute and the Centre for Medieval Studies at the Pontifical Institute of Medieval Studies, 2011-12. She was a Distinguished Visitor at the Centre of Medieval Studies, University of Toronto (January–April 2012). She has contributed biographies to the Oxford Dictionary of National Biography.

Between 2003 and 2012 Leyser appeared in five editions of the BBC Radio 4 programme In Our Time, discussing subjects including the East-West Schism, the Concordat of Worms and the life of Gerald of Wales.

In 2011, Leyser received a Festschrift entitled Motherhood, Religion, and Society in Medieval Europe, 400–1400: Essays Presented to Henrietta Leyser, edited by her son Conrad Leyser and Lesley Smith (Farnham: Ashgate).

Leyser was married to the historian Karl Leyser (1920–1992). Their children are Dame Ottoline Leyser, Regius Professor of Botany, Conrad Leyser, also a medieval historian, and circus performer and author Matilda Leyser.

== Select bibliography ==
- (1984) Hermits and the New Monasticism: A Study of Religious Communities in Western Europe, 1000-1150, Macmillan, ISBN 0333325826
- (1995) Medieval Women: A Social History of Women in England 450-1500, Weidenfeld & Nicolson, ISBN 1842126210
- (2001) co-edited with Richard Gameson, Belief and Culture in the Middle Ages: Studies Presented to Henry Mayr-Harting. New York: Oxford University Press.
- (2005) co-edited with Samuel Fanous, Christina of Markyate: A Twelfth Century Holy Woman, London & New York: Routledge,
- (2015) Beda: A Journey to the Seven Kingdoms at the Time of Bede, Head of Zeus, ISBN 9781781853870
- (2016) A Short History of the Anglo-Saxons, I.B. Tauris Short Histories, ISBN 9781780766003
