= Karl Leyser =

German-born British historian

Professor Karl Leyser TD FBA
- Born: Karl Joseph Leyser; 24 October 1920; Düsseldorf, Germany
- Died: 27 May 1992 (aged 71)
- Citizenship: German (until 1937); British (from 1946)
- Occupations: Historian and academic
- Title: Chichele Professor of Medieval History
- Spouse: Henrietta Bateman (m. 1962)
- Children: 4, including Conrad and Ottoline

Academic background
- Education: St Paul's School, London
- Alma mater: Magdalen College, Oxford
- Doctoral advisor: Maurice Powicke

Academic work
- Discipline: History
- Sub-discipline: Early Middle Ages
- Institutions: Magdalen College, Oxford; All Souls College, Oxford
- Notable students: John Nightingale; Timothy Reuter

Karl Joseph Leyser TD FBA (24 October 1920 – 27 May 1992) was a German-born British historian who was Fellow and Tutor in History, Magdalen College, Oxford, from 1948 to 1984, and Chichele Professor of Medieval History at Oxford University, from 1984 to 1988.

== Early life and military service ==
Leyser was born in Düsseldorf to Otto Leyser, a manufacturer of belts and braces, and Emmy Leyser (née Hayum). In 1937 the family was declared stateless by the Nazi regime and Karl moved to England with his sister Dorothée while their parents escaped to the Netherlands.

Leyser began studying at St Paul's School in London in 1937, with the medieval historian Wilhelm Levison, a relative of Otto's, helping with the fees. In 1939 he won a demyship to study at Magdalen College, Oxford, but joined the Army a year later after a short spell in an internment camp on the Isle of Man as an enemy alien. Throughout the war Leyser engaged in regular correspondence with his tutor at Magdalen, K. B. McFarlane.

In 1943 Leyser transferred from the Royal Pioneer Corps to the Black Watch in Perth, where from 1944 he saw active service as part of the Black Watch's 7th battalion until October 1945. Two weeks after the German surrender, Leyser, then a lieutenant, reunited with his parents by chance while driving through Edam. Between 1937 and 1939 Otto had built up a new factory, but after the German occupation of the Netherlands he and Emmy were forced into hiding.

Leyser returned to Magdalen in January 1946 and achieved a First in his finals in 1947, alongside Roger Highfield. A year later McFarlane called Leyser the greatest pupil he ever had in a letter to Goronwy Edwards. Leyser also became a naturalised British citizen in 1946.

Leyser continued his military service after the Second World War, serving as a captain and later a major in the Territorial and Army Volunteer Reserve.

== Academic career ==
In 1947 Leyser initiated his doctoral studies at Oxford under the supervision of Maurice Powicke, focusing on the life of Archbishop John Peckham. He abandoned this project, however, upon his election to a Tutorial Fellowship in History at Magdalen College in 1948. McFarlane, now his colleague, encouraged Leyser to begin working on Germany as so few young scholars were linguistically qualified to work on the area. He was elected a Fellow of the British Academy in 1983 and a year later was appointed Chichele Professor of Medieval History at All Souls College.

He wrote extensively on early medieval Germany, with a particular focus on Saxony, publishing over 70 articles and books in both German and English. His interests included royal rule and royal personality, diplomacy, politics, warfare, and the early Holy Roman Empire.

Peter Brown, who attended a lecture series of Leyser's as an undergraduate in 1956, remembered him thus in his Journeys of the Mind:

He was a short, robust figure with a worn gown over a sporty brown tweed jacket, beige waistcoat, and cavalry twill trousers, and his flashing eyes looked out from under a shock of raven-black hair. His enunciation was perfect, with the slight touch of a guttural, German accent that made his voice sink to a growl at significant moments. Karl Leyser just stood there and became the refined, Byzantinized Otto III or the gruff Conrad the Salian under our eyes.

== Personal life ==
Leyser married fellow Oxford medievalist Henrietta Bateman in 1962. They had four children together: Conrad, an Oxford medievalist; Ottoline, a Cambridge plant biologist; Crispin, a television consultant; and Matilda, a circus performer and author.

Leyser was Jewish but stopped his public practice of the religion after moving to Britain. He died of complications following a stroke in 1992.
