= Hannah Skoda =

English historian and academic (born 1981)

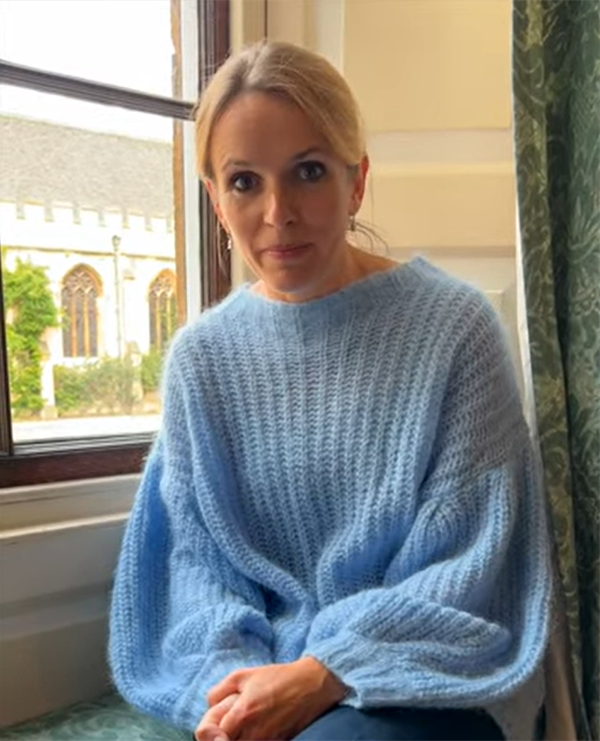
- Skoda in 2024
- Born: Hannah Sarah Wheeler; 30 June 1981 (age 45)
- Occupations: Historian and academic
- Children: 2
- Awards: Philip Leverhulme Prize

Academic background
- Education: Wadham College, Oxford
- Thesis: Popular violence in late thirteenth- and early fourteenth-century France (2008)
- Doctoral advisor: Gervase Rosser; Malcolm Vale

Academic work
- Discipline: History
- Sub-discipline: Later Middle Ages; France in the Middle Ages; Violence; Gender history; Nostalgia; Legal history; History of slavery
- Institutions: Merton College, Oxford; St John's College, Oxford

Hannah Sarah Skoda (née Wheeler; born 30 June 1981) is an English historian of Europe in the late medieval period. She is Associate Professor of Medieval History at the University of Oxford and Fellow and Tutor in History at St John's College.

== Academic career ==
Skoda was an undergraduate and graduate student at Wadham College, Oxford, matriculating in 1998. She studied history and French at undergraduate level, not choosing to study any medieval history until her final year but becoming fascinated with French medieval literature. Her first tutor in medieval history at the university was Mark Whittow for a paper on France during the reign of Philip IV. Her doctoral thesis was supervised by Gervase Rosser and Malcolm Vale. Following the completion of her doctorate in 2008 she was elected to a Junior Research Fellowship at Merton College. In October 2010 she was elected to a Tutorial Fellowship at St John's College, succeeding her former supervisor Vale.

Since 2014 Skoda has served as Keeper of the Silver for St John's College, and in 2019 also became Keeper of the Laudian Vestments. From 2020 until 2025 she also served as the Faculty of History's co-ordinator for the Athena SWAN gender equality accreditation scheme.

=== Research ===
Skoda's first monograph, based on her doctoral thesis, was entitled Medieval Violence: Physical Brutality in Northern France, 1270–1330 and was published in 2013 by Oxford University Press as part of their Oxford Historical Monographs series.

Skoda has co-edited numerous collections of essays; the first, titled Contact and Exchange in Later Medieval Europe and dedicated to her doctoral supervisor Malcolm Vale, was co-edited with Patrick Lantschner and R. L. J. Shaw and published in 2012. Another volume, titled Legalism: Anthropology and History, co-edited with Paul Dresch, was published by Oxford University Press in 2012 as the first in a series of proceedings from the Oxford Legalism Seminar. Skoda's second editorial contribution to the series came in 2018 with the publication of Legalism: Property and Ownership, co-edited with Georgy Kantor and Thomas Lambert.

Skoda was the sole editor of the 2023 collection A Companion to Crime and Deviance in the Middle Ages, published by Arc Humanities Press. Her journal articles and book chapters have focused on subjects such as representations of disability in accounts of saints' miracles; student violence in medieval French and English universities; and the concept of nostalgia in the pre-modern world.

Skoda held editorial positions at the journal The English Historical Review from 2018 to 2025, first as a book reviews editor and then as a general editor. She currently sits on the editorial board of the Oxford Historical Monographs series for Oxford University Press. Skoda is also an editor of the History Workshop Journal.

Skoda was principal investigator of a collaborative project with Historic Royal Palaces and the Royal Armouries focused on the Tower of London, entitled '(Hi)stories of Violence: Myth-Making, Imprisonment and the Cultural Identity of the Tower of London'.

=== Media work ===
Skoda contributes to the blog Now and Then which explores the importance of studying history. She also hosts the monthly podcast series History Behind the Headlines for History Extra alongside Rana Mitter, in which they examine current affairs from a historian's perspective and discuss news from the historical discipline. In July 2014 Skoda appeared in an episode of the BBC Radio 4 series Making History hosted by Tom Holland, discussing the relationship between violence and justice in the medieval period.

Skoda has also written for BBC History Magazine, the Times Literary Supplement and History Today. She has taught an online introductory course on late medieval England for the History Extra Academy and a lecture course on crime and punishment in the later medieval period for Massolit. She also contributed to a BBC Radio 3 feature on student violence in medieval Oxford in 2023.

== Honours and awards ==
In 2014 Skoda's first monograph won the International Society for Medieval Feminist Scholarship's award for Best First Book of Feminist Scholarship on the Middle Ages. She won a Philip Leverhulme Prize in recognition of the international impact of her research on violence in 2015, and in 2018 she was awarded a Sir Henry Wellcome Postdoctoral Fellowship. She was awarded a British Academy Mid-Career Fellowship in 2020.

== Personal life ==
Skoda plays the harp and has previously busked with the instrument. She has two sons.

== Bibliography ==
=== Books ===
- Contact and Exchange in Later Medieval Europe: Essays in Honour of Malcolm Vale (co-editor with Patrick Lantschner and R. L. J. Shaw; Woodbridge: Boydell & Brewer, 2012)
- Legalism: Anthropology and History (co-editor with Paul Dresch; Oxford: Oxford University Press, 2012)
- Medieval Violence: Physical Brutality in Northern France, 1270–1330 (Oxford: Oxford University Press, 2013)
- Legalism: Property and Ownership (co-editor with Georgy Kantor and Tom Lambert; Oxford: Oxford University Press, 2018)
- A Companion to Crime and Deviance in the Middle Ages (editor; Amsterdam: Arc Humanities Press, 2023)

=== Journal articles ===
- 'Violent Discipline or Disciplining Violence? Experience and Reception of Domestic Violence in Late Thirteenth-Century and Early Fourteenth-Century Paris and Picardy', Cultural and Social History 6:1 (2009), pp. 9–27
- 'Nostalgia and (Pre-)Modernity', History and Theory 62:2 (2023), pp. 251–271
- 'Frying Pans, Limpets, Donkeys and Becs-jaunes: Thinking About Violence in Late Medieval Universities', Global Intellectual History (2023), pp. 1–20
- 'St Wilgefortis and Her/Their Beard: The Devotions of Unhappy Wives and Non-Binary People', History Workshop Journal 95:1 (2023), pp. 51–74
- 'Slave Voices and Experiences in Later Medieval Europe', History Compass 21:10 (2023), pp. 1–12
- 'Medievalisms and Medieval Times: Confronting Chronopolitics with Medieval Textures of Time', History and Theory 62:4 (2023), pp. 142–156

=== Book chapters ===
- 'La Vierge et la Vieille: L’expertise féminine au xive siècle', in Experts et expertises au Moyen Âge: Consilium quaeritur a perito (Paris: Éditions de la Sorbonne, 2012), pp. 299–311
- 'Representations of Disability in the Thirteenth-Century Miracles de Saint Louis', in Joshua R. Eyler (ed.), Disability in the Middle Ages: Reconsiderations and Reverberations (Farnham: Ashgate Publishing, 2010), pp. 53–66
- 'Legal Performances in Late Medieval France', in Paul Dresch and Hannah Skoda (eds.), Legalism: Anthropology and History (Oxford: Oxford University Press, 2012), pp. 279–306
- 'Student Violence in Fifteenth-Century Paris and Oxford', in Jonathan Davies (ed.), Aspects of Violence in Renaissance Europe (Farnham: Ashgate Publishing, 2013)
- 'Collective Violence and Popular Justice in the Later Middle Ages', in Michael J. Pfeifer (ed.), Global Lynching and Collective Violence, Volume 2: The Americas and Europe (Springfield: University of Illinois Press, 2017), pp. 12–33
- 'Collective Violence in Fourteenth- and Fifteenth-Century Oxford', in Pieter Dhondt and Elizabethanne Boran (eds.), Student Revolt, City, and Society in Europe: From the Middle Ages to the Present (London and New York: Routledge, 2017), pp. 222–234
- 'People as Property in Medieval Dubrovnik', in Georgy Kantor, Tom Lambert and Hannah Skoda (eds.), Legalism: Property and Ownership (Oxford: Oxford University Press, 2018), pp. 235–260
- 'Crime and Law in Europe', in Matthew S. Gordon, Richard W. Kaeuper and Harriet Zurndorfer (eds.), The Cambridge World History of Violence, Volume II: 500-1500 CE (Cambridge: Cambridge University Press, 2020), pp. 185–204
- 'Disciplined Dissent and Nostalgia in Late Medieval England', in Fabrizio Titone (ed.), Disciplined Dissent in Western Europe, 1200-1600: Political Action Between Submission and Defiance (Turnhout: Brepols, 2022), pp. 195–222
- 'Pastoral Nostalgia in the Long Fourteenth Century', in Harriet Lyon and Alexandra Walsham (eds.), Nostalgia in the Early Modern World: Memory, Temporality, and Emotion (Cambridge: Cambridge University Press, 2023), pp. 27–48
