= Kate Cooper =

Historian and academic (born 1960)

Professor Kate Cooper FRHistS
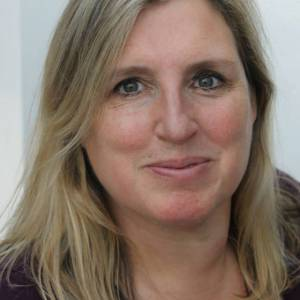
- Born: 1960 (age 65–66); Washington, D.C., United States
- Occupations: Lecturer; Classical scholar
- Title: Professor of History
- Spouse: Conrad Leyser
- Children: 2

Academic background
- Education: Wesleyan University; Harvard University; Princeton University
- Thesis: Concord and Martyrdom: Gender, Community, and the Uses of Christian Perfection in Late Antiquity (1992)
- Doctoral advisor: Peter Brown

Academic work
- Discipline: Classics
- Sub-discipline: Late Roman society
- Institutions: University of Manchester; Royal Holloway, University of London

Kate Cooper FRHistS (born 1960) is a professor of history and former head of the History Department at Royal Holloway, University of London, a role to which she was appointed in September 2017 and she stood down in 2019. She was previously professor of ancient history and head of the Department of Classics and Ancient History at the University of Manchester, where she taught from 1995.

== Early life and education ==
Cooper was born in 1960 in Washington, D.C. to Robbi and Kent Cooper. She gained a BA in English Literature from Wesleyan University in 1982, and an M.T.S. in Scripture and Interpretation from Harvard University in 1986. She was awarded her doctorate for the thesis 'Concord and Martyrdom: Gender, Community, and the Uses of Christian Perfection in Late Antiquity' from the Department of the Study of Religion, Princeton University, in 1992. Her supervisor was Peter Brown. She is known by and publishes under the name Kate Cooper.

== Career ==
Cooper held a Leverhulme Trust Major Research Fellowship (2012–15) for a project on 'The Early Christian Martyr Acts: A New Approach to Ancient Heroes of Resistance'. Her research interests are the cultural, social, and religious history of late Roman society, focusing particularly on the Christianization of Roman elites, and on daily life and the Roman family, religion and gender, social identity, and the fall of the Roman Empire. Other major fellowships and prizes she has held include a Research Councils UK Fellowship to investigate the role of violence in early Christianity during the century before and after the reign of Constantine the Great, asking what was distinctive about the Christian approach to violence, and the role of violence in establishing identities and boundaries between communities (2009–12); and the Rome Prize (1990-1). She was a Summer Fellow at Dumbarton Oaks in 1998. Her project was “The Roman Cult of Eastern Martyrs, 400–700”. She is a regular contributor to print and broadcast media in the US and UK, and blogs about her work.

== Critical reception of work ==
Her work has been described as 'ambitious', 'valuable', and 'noteworthy'. Band of Angels was reviewed in the New Statesman, which said: "Her book is characterised by a scholarly seriousness and the disarmingly unapologetic way she links the personal, the political and the institutional. Avoiding clichés, she excavates the experiences of a wide range of women, letting them speak for themselves. Strikingly, she also refers to her own experiences." The work was described as '‘the best kind of popular history.’

A more mixed view was taken in a review in The Daily Telegraph, which found "Cooper has written a highly readable and important work of the history of religion. She wears her evident scholarship lightly, but the text is suffused with personal, imaginative and emotional perspectives. From the prologue, with its memories of her childhood and her mother, to the epilogue's fictitious portrayal of a virgin mother at the Council of Chalcedon in the fifth century, she abandons the detachment of the professional historian. While this can work well in the realms of human history, it seems to me problematic in the domain of religious history. This fine book, in other words, left me wondering whether Prof Cooper wasn’t having her faith claims and eating them."

A The Guardian review said the book was "as much an exercise in historical detective work as anything else, an act of reading between and behind the lines, rescuing these lost women from ancient sources, assessing their influence, and placing their lives in a broader social and historical context."

Cooper was shortlisted for the 2023 Cundill History Prize for Queens of a Fallen World: The Lost women of Augustine’s Confessions.

== Personal life ==
Cooper is married to Conrad Leyser, a medieval historian at the University of Oxford. They have two daughters together.

== Works ==
=== Journal articles and book chapters ===
- 'Christianity, Private Power, and the Law from Decius to Constantine: The Minimalist View', Journal of Early Christian Studies 19 (2011), 327-43
- 'The Long Shadow of Constantine', Journal of Roman Studies (2014)
- 'Martyrdom, Memory, and the "Media Event": Visionary Writing and Christian Apology in Second-Century Christianity', in Dominic Janes and Alex Houen (eds), Martyrdom and Terrorism: Pre-Modern to Contemporary Perspectives (Oxford: Oxford University Press, 2014), 23-39
- 'Religion, Conflict, and "The Secular": The View From Early Christianity', in John Wolffe and Gavin Moorhead, Religion, Security, and Global Uncertainties (Milton Keynes: Open University, 2014),13-15
- 'Relationships, Resistance, and Religious Change in the Early Christian Household', in John Doran, Charlotte Methuen, and Alexandra Walsham, eds., Religion and the Household (Woodbridge, Boydell Press, 2014), 5-22
- The Heroine and the Historian: Procopius of Caesarea on the Troubled Reign of Queen Amalasuentha, From Jonathan J. Arnold, M. Shane Bjornlie, and Kristina Sessa, eds, A COMPANION TO OSTROGOTHIC ITALY (Leiden: Brill, 2016), 296-315
- 'The Bride of Christ, the 'Male Woman,' and the Female Reader in Late Antiquity', in Judith Bennett and Ruth Mazo Karas, eds., The Oxford Handbook of Women and Gender in Medieval Europe (Oxford: Oxford University Press, 2013), 529-44
- 'A Father, a Daughter, and a Procurator: Authority and Resistance in the Prison Memoir of Perpetua of Carthage', Gender and History 23 (2011), 686-703
- 'Gender and the Fall of Rome', in Philip Rousseau, ed., A Companion to Late Antiquity (Oxford: Wiley-Blackwell, 2009)
- 'Insinuations of Womanly Influence: An Aspect of the Christianization of the Roman Aristocracy,' Journal of Roman Studies 82 (1992), 113-27
- 'The Voice of the Victim: Gender, Representation, and Early Christian Martyrdom,' Bulletin of the John Rylands Library 80:3 (1998), 147-57
- 'All You Need is Love' (review of Karen Armstrong, St Paul: The Misunderstood Apostle), The Literary Review, November 2015 (Issue 437), p. 21
- 'Closely Watched Households: Visibility, exposure, and private power in the Roman domus', Past and Present 197 (Nov. 2007), 3-33
- 'Conversion, Conflict, and the Drama of Social Reproduction: Narratives of Filial Resistance in Early Christianity and Modern Britain', in Brigitte Secher Bøgh, ed., Conversion and Initiation in Antiquity: Shifting Identities - Creating Change (Frankfurt am Main: Peter Lang, 2015), 169-83
- 'Ventriloquism and the Miraculous: Conversion, Preaching, and the Martyr Exemplum in Late Antiquity,' in Kate Cooper and Jeremy Gregory, eds., Signs, Wonders, and Miracles (Studies in Church History vol. 41, Woodbridge: Boydell and Brewer, 2005), 22-45
- 'A Saint in Exile: The Early Medieval Thecla at Rome and Meriamlik', Hagiographica 2 (1995), 1-23
- 'Augustine and Monnica', in Conrad Leyser and Lesley Smith, eds., Motherhood, Religion, and Society in Medieval Europe, 400-1400 (Aldershot: Ashgate, 2011), 7-20
- 'The Martyr, the matrona and the Bishop: Networks of Allegiance in Early Sixth-Century Rome,' Early Medieval Europe 8:3 (1999), 297-317

=== Monographs ===
- Band of Angels: The Forgotten World of Early Christian Women 2013 ISBN 9781848873285
- The Fall of the Roman Household 2007 ISBN 9780521884600
- The Virgin and the Bride: idealized womanhood in late antiquity 1996 ISBN 0674939492

=== Edited volumes ===
- Kate Cooper and Conrad Leyser, Making Early Medieval Societies: Conflict and Belonging in the Latin West, 300-1200 (Cambridge: Cambridge University Press, 2016)
- Kate Cooper and Julia Hillner (eds.), Religion, dynasty, and patronage in early Christian Rome, 300-900, c.2007 ISBN 9780521131278

=== Media ===
- Cunk On Earth - Episode 2, interviewee. Netflix, released February 2023
- In Our Time, BBC Radio Four, on early Christian martyrdom, aired 28 April 2022. With Candida Moss and James Corke-Webster
- In Our Time, BBC Radio Four, on Augustine and The Confessions, aired 15 March 2018. With Morwenna Ludlow and Martin Palmer
- CNN: Finding Jesus 2 (six-part documentary programme; airs Easter 2017); interviewee (all episodes)
- BBC ONE: The Big Questions: Featured Guest (17 May 2015, "Is God the Problem?")
- BBC ONE: The Big Questions: Featured Guest (8 March 2015, "Is it More Important to do Good than to do God?")
- BBC iwonder: Why didn't Christianity Die out in the 1st Century?
- CNN: Finding Jesus (six-part documentary programme; Easter 2015); interviewee (episodes on Mary Magdalene, The Apostle James, The Empress Helena) and historical consultant (episode on the Empress Helena, aired Easter 2015)
- National Geographic Channel: The Jesus Mysteries (aired 19, 20 & 21 April 2014)
- The Guardian (11 February 2014)
- Premier Christian Radio: Maria Rodriguez-Toth interviewing Kate Cooper, Woman to Woman (31 December 2013)
- TRUNEWS Radio: Rick Wiles interviewing Kate Cooper (13 September 2013)
- Have Women Been Airbrushed from Church History? Interview With Kate Cooper’ (4 October 2013)
- BBC Radio 4: "The Ideas that Make Us: Love" (Bettany Hughes interview with Kate Cooper, Wednesday, 18 September 2013)
- BBC Radio 4: "Every Generation Within Christianity Has Had Female Leaders" – Kate Cooper from Manchester University Talks About Her New Book (Clip of William Crawley interviewing Kate Cooper on Sunday, 11 August 2013)
- Study: Women Influential in Early Christianity Have Been ‘Airbrushed’ From History, Profile by Katie Collins for wired.co.uk (9 August 2013)
- ‘Christians airbrushed women out of history’, University of Manchester Press Release for Band of Angels: The Forgotten World of Early Christian Women (9 August 2013)
- RTÉ 1 (Ireland): Today with Pat Kenny. Pat Kenny Interview with Kate Cooper, (30 July 2013)
- NewsTalk (Ireland): Moncrieff. Sean Moncrieff Interviewing Kate Cooper, (30 July 2013, at minute 34)
- A Different Kind of Family Debate (article by Kate), The Huffington Post (29 June 2013)
- BBC Radio 4: In Our Time: episode: Queen Zenobia (hosted by Melvin Bragg, with Kate Cooper, Edith Hall, Richard Stoneman, 30 May 2013)
- A Week in December Revisited, article by Kate Cooper, The Huffington Post (26 April 2013)
- National Geographic Channel: Jesus: The Rise to Power (Clip of interview with Kate Cooper on the Great Persecution, aired 28 March 2013 [US] and 1 April 2013 [UK])
- BBC One: The Mystery of Mary Magdalene (Melvin Bragg-presented programme featuring interviews with Kate Cooper, aired 29 March 2013)
- BBC Two: Divine Women (Clip of Bettany Hughes interviewing Kate Cooper, ‘Women's Role in the Very Early Days of Christianity‘; aired 11 April 2012)
- Trailer clip for BBC Two's Divine Women, featuring Kate Cooper on New Testament Women (Aired 11 April 2012)
- BBC Radio 4: ‘Banishing Eve’, Aired 21 and 28 March 2010

== See also ==
- List of Fellows of the American Academy in Rome 1991–2010
