= Robert Austin Markus =

British historian and philosopher (1924–2010)

- Born: 8 October 1924; Budapest, Hungary
- Died: 8 December 2010 (aged 86); Nottingham, England
- Spouse: Margaret Catherine Bullen (m. 1955)
- Children: 3

Academic background
- Education: University of Manchester
- Doctoral advisor: Dorothy Emmet

Academic work
- Discipline: History
- Institutions: University of Liverpool; University of Nottingham
- Notable students: Ian Kershaw
- Main interests: History of Christianity
- Notable works: The End of Ancient Christianity (1990)

Robert Austin Markus, OBE, FBA (8 October 1924 – 8 December 2010), born Róbert Imre Márkus, was a Hungarian-born British historian and philosopher best known for his research on the early history of Christianity.

== Early life ==
Róbert Imre Márkus was born in Budapest, Hungary on 8 October 1924. Both of his parents were Jews with ties to Christianity. His father, Gyözö (Victor) Márkus (1897–1971), was the director of a heavy engineering firm which had been founded by Robert's grandfather Márkus Lajos, originally a locksmith. Robert's mother, Lili (Lily) Elek (1900–1962), was the daughter of the manager of an enormous forest in Osijek, modern-day Croatia. She was an internationally recognized ceramicist.

Robert's father had converted to Lutheranism as a young man, but later regretted his decision and applied for readmission to the synagogue. Robert had his Bar Mitzvah celebration in Budapest, though his younger brother Tomás did not, as the family left Hungary when Tomás was only 11 years old.

== Education ==
Markus attended the Áldás elementary school in Budapest, and later boarding schools in Lausanne and Bern. His family emigrated to England in 1939 and settled in Glossop, where his father and uncle had arranged with the local MP Hugh Molson, Baron Molson to establish Ferrostatics, a small engineering factory at Hollingworth. The factory was soon producing precision machine tools for the manufacture of Spitfires, which enabled the family to avoid internment as enemy aliens on the Isle of Man. After the war, Ferrostatics continued with precision engineering for major companies, such as Imperial Chemical Industries, and was eventually sold to the Chloride Electrical Storage Company.

Markus completed his high school education at Kingsmoor School, Glossop. He subsequently enrolled at the University of Manchester as a chemistry student. Markus had originally sought to study philosophy, while his father wanted him to become and engineer and assume control of the family business, and chemistry thus became a compromise choice. At the university he came under the influence of Professor of Physical Chemistry Michael Polanyi. As a chemist Markus was exempted from military service during World War II, and instead served as a works chemist at a The Co-operative Group margarine factory in accordance with the wartime Essential Work Order.

After the war, Markus began studying philosophy at the University of Manchester. Here befriended his professor Dorothy Emmet, who had a major influence on him. His 1948 MA on Samuel Alexander, and his 1950 PhD on Cartesianism, were both supervised by Emmet.

At Manchester, Markus belonged to a circle of future prominent intellectuals, which included Walter Stein, Herbert McCabe and Eric John. The circle was characterized by radical socialist ideas, but many were also Catholics, like the three just mentioned. Several members of the group were Marxists, most notably his close friend Walter Stein, and throughout his life, Markus would belong to the political left. Among the members of Markus' intellectual circle was the history student Margaret Catherine Bullen, with whom Markus would eventually marry. One of the members of the group was the "very liberal" Roman Catholic priest Father Vincent Whelan. Seeing the need for Christian conscience in the aftermath of the invention of nuclear weapons, Markus received instruction as a Catholic from Father Whelan in 1946. His parents and brother followed him into conversion. Together with Walter Stein, Willy Schenk and Louis Allen, Robert founded the journal Humanitas, which aimed to united Catholic values and social reform through radical change of both the Church and secular society. Together with Stein, Markus wrote Nuclear Warfare and the Christian Conscience (1949), which argued in favour of nuclear disarmament. In the summer of 1949, Márkus went on a pilgrimage to Rome with his close friend Father Wheelan. Markus envisioned a more diverse Church where the Vatican had less authority, and would later rejoice over the radical changes implemented at the Second Vatican Council under Pope John XXIII.

== Career ==
With his friend McCabe, Markus left Manchester for Oxford in 1950, where he joined the Dominican Order at Blackfriars, Oxford. It was at this time where he changed his name to Robert Austin Markus. Forbidden by his novice master from reading philosophy during his first year at Blackfriars, Markus was encouraged to read the scriptural commentaries of Augustine. The study of Augustine would later become central to his scholarly work.

In 1954, Markus left Blackfriars for Birmingham, where he found work as a librarian. In 1955, Markus moved to Liverpool, where he worked at the university library under the librarian and scholar Kenneth Povey. Povey encouraged Markus to continue his research and from 1958, Markus was lecturer, and later senior lecturer and reader, in the department of medieval history at the University of Liverpool. At the time the department was headed by Christopher N. L. Brooke. At the time Markus lectured on a number of subjects, including Bede, and on ancient and medieval political thought. By 1960, Markus had become greatly interested in Pope Gregory I, and was offered to supervise a Special Subject on him. Among the early students to follow Markus' special subject on Gregory the Great was Ian Kershaw.

In the 1960s, Markus befriended fellow historian Peter Brown, with whom he established a close friendship. Along with Brown, Markus played a decisive role in establishing Late Antiquity as a distinct period in European history. His reading of William Frend The Donatist Church greatly influenced him. While Frend argued that the Donatists represented the aspirations of the Berbers of North Africa, Markus agreed with Brown that they rather represented the pre-Constantian uncentralised traditions of the African Church. In subsequent years, Markus studied the early history of Christianity as a force in the social and political history of ancient Rome. His first monograph, Saeculum: History and Society in the Theology of Saint Augustine (1970), saw Augustine as a dissenter from the triumphalism of the post-Constantinian Christianity. In his Christianity in the Roman World (1974), Markus subjected the social and cultural history of Christianity to further study, and examined how it came to be the state religion of the Roman Empire. Markus argued that the growth of Christianity was largely achieved through its gradual incorporation of classical values, which made it more acceptable to Roman elites.

In 1974, Markus was appointed Chair of Medieval History at the University of Nottingham. By this time, he had established himself as leading authority on the history of the early Church. During his period at Nottingham, Markus contributed greatly making the Nottingham Department of Classics a leading institution in its field. He was President of the Ecclesiastical History Society from 1978 to 1979.

Markus took an early retirement from the University of Nottingham in 1982. He would later classify his early retirement as the best decision of his life apart from marrying his wife. He was elected a Fellow of the British Academy in 1985. From 1986 to 1987 he was a visiting scholar at the Institute for Advanced Study. He was Distinguished Visiting Professor at the Catholic University of America in 1988. Although retiring from university duties apart from a few guest lectures, Markus continued researching and writing. His The End of Ancient Christianity (1990) examined how Roman culture eroded from the time of Augustine to that of Pope Gregory the Great. Wolf Liebeschuetz has described The End of Ancient Christianity as Markus' masterpiece. It was followed by Gregory the Great and His World (1997). In these two studies Markus showed how the lives of these two figures intersected despite the continuing transformation of Christianity. From 1991 to 1995, Markus was President of the International Association of Patristic Studies. He was Visiting Professor at Notre Dame University in 1993. A festschrift, The Limits of Ancient Christianity: Essays on Late Antique Thought and Culture, was published in honor of Markus in 1999. Markus was appointed OBE in 2000.

== Death ==
Markus spent his last days in Beeston, Nottingham, and died of prostate cancer at City Hospital, Nottingham on 8 December 2010. He was survived by his wife, three children and four grandchildren.

== Personal life ==
Markus married Margaret Catherine Bullen in Manchester on 13 August 1955, with whom he had two sons and one daughter. A Roman Catholic, Margaret was the daughter of John Joseph Bullen, who managed a shop for the Co-operative Wholesale Society in the Wirral.

== Selected works ==
- Saeculum: History and Society in the Theology of St Augustine. Cambridge University Press. 1970. ISBN 9780521368551.
- Christianity in the Roman World. Scribner. 1974. ISBN 9780684141299.
- The End of Ancient Christianity. Cambridge University Press. 1990. ISBN 9780521339490.
- Gregory the Great and His World. Cambridge University Press. 1997. ISBN 9780521586085.

== Sources ==
- Cooper, Kate (9 January 2014). "Markus, Robert Austin". Oxford Dictionary of National Biography (online ed.). Oxford University Press. doi:10.1093/ref:odnb/103000. ISBN 9780198614111. (Subscription, Wikipedia Library access or UK public library membership required.)
- Liebeschuetz, Wolf (25 February 2011). "Robert Markus: Medieval historian noted for his writings on the early Church". The Independent.
- Liebeschuetz, J. H. W. G. (28 November 2012). "Markus, Robert Austin, 1924-2010" (PDF). Biographical Memoirs of Fellows of the British Academy. 11. Oxford University Press: 474–490.
- Nelson, Jinty (9 January 2011). "Robert Markus". The Guardian.
- "Markus, Robert". The Times. 14 December 2010. p. 55.
