= Kristina Sessa =

American historian

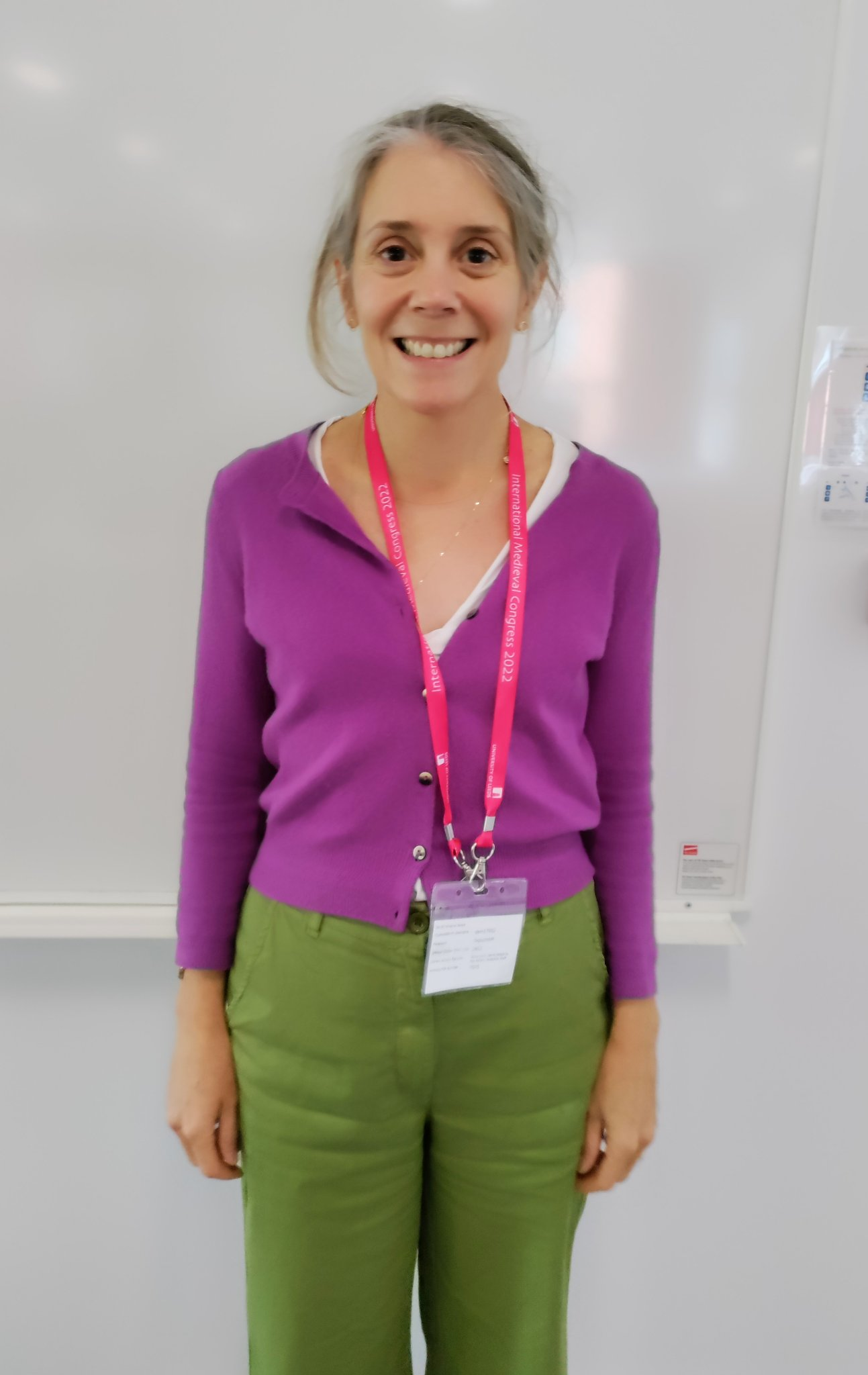
Professor Kristina Sessa, July 2022

Kristina Sessa is Professor of History at Ohio State University. She is an expert on the cultural history of the late antique and early medieval Mediterranean world from ca. 300-700 CE.

== Education ==
Sessa was awarded an A.B. in Religion from Princeton University in 1992, and a Masters in Medieval History from the University of California, Berkeley (1996). She received her PhD from the University of California, Berkeley in 2003. Her thesis was entitled The Household and the Bishop: Establishing Episcopal Authority in Late Antique Rome.

== Career ==
Sessa was Assistant Professor of Ancient Mediterranean History at Claremont McKenna College 2003–06. She joined the Department of History at Ohio State University as associate professor in 2007. Sessa was awarded the 2006 Graves Award for her project 'Fighting for Christ and Rome: Christianity and the Culture of War in Late Antiquity (300-600 CE)'. She was a Fellow at the American Academy in Rome (2001–02) and the Italian Academy for Advanced Studies in America at Columbia University (2006–07). She was a visiting scholar at the Centre for Late Antiquity at Manchester University. She received an ACLS Fellowship for her project, 'The Church at War in Late Antiquity, 350-700 CE'. With Ra’anan Boustan, she edits the journal Studies in Late Antiquity for the University of California Press.

== Selected bibliography ==
- The Formation of Papal Authority in Late Antique Italy: Roman Bishops and the Domestic Sphere (Cambridge: Cambridge University Press, 2012)
- (co-editor with Jonathan J. Arnold and Michael Shane Bjornlie) A Companion to Ostrogothic Italy (Ledien: Brill, 2016)
- Daily Life in Late Antiquity (Cambridge: Cambridge University Press, 2018)
