= Michael John (historian) =

Austrian historian and exhibitions-curator (born 1954)

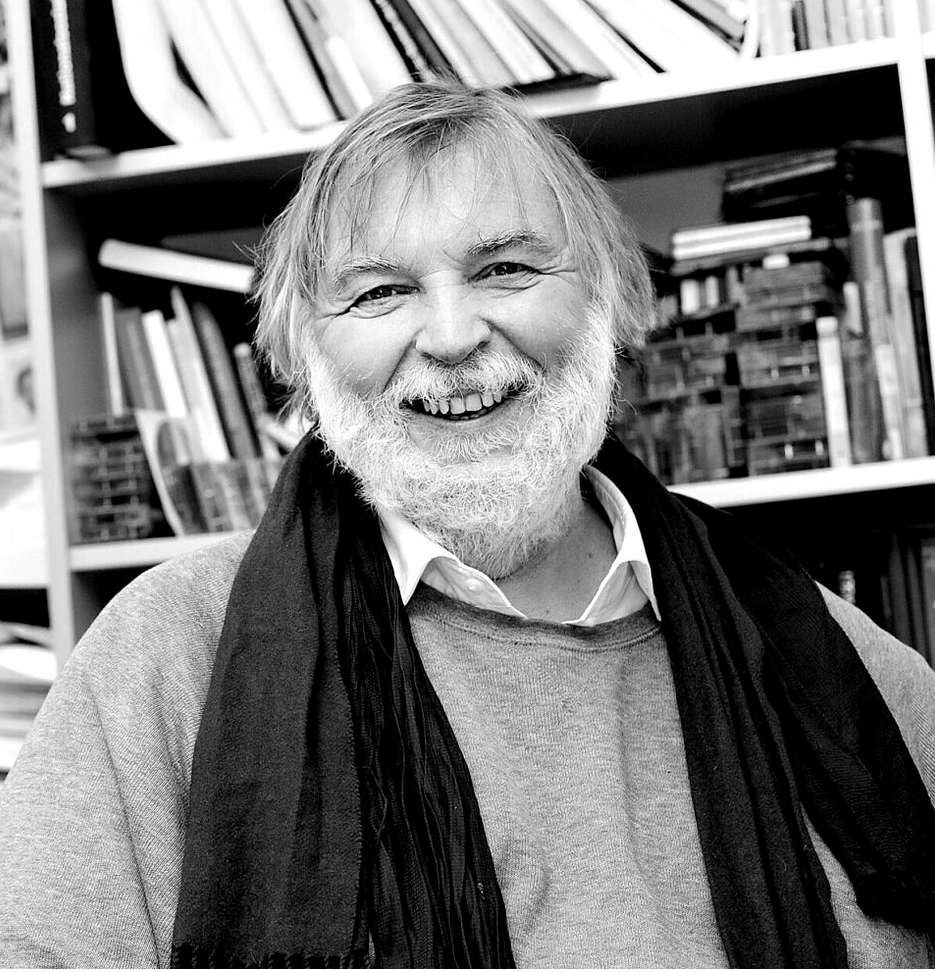
- Born: 1954 (age 71–72); Linz, Mühlviertel, Republic of Austria

Academic background
- Education: University of Vienna
- Thesis: (1980)

Academic work
- Discipline: History
- Sub-discipline: Applied history
- Main interests: Nazism

Michael John (born 1954 in Linz, Upper Austria) is an Austrian historian and exhibitions-curator, internationally known for his research on European and Jewish migration, and on Nazism (like Nazi plunder, Forced labour under German rule during World War II, or the Holocaust in Austria).

== Biography ==
Michael John finished his high school education 1971 with the Matura at the so-called "Academic" Gymnasium in Linz, and studied from 1972 to 1980 History und Political science at the University of Vienna. During his studies he turned to Social and Economic history, and graduated 1980 as Ph.D. with a thesis on housing of the working and lower classes in Vienna around 1900 (see John 1982, John 1984).

He started his scientific career 1985 at the Institute for Social and Economic History (University of Vienna), and continued it 1986 at the Institute for Social and Economic History at the University of Linz. There he advanced from Assistant professor (1993) to Associate professor (2001, after his Habilitation with a study on the population of Linz in the 19th and 20th century as result of national and international migration, see John 2000). He was deputy head (2008-2014, 2017–2019) and head (2015-2017) of the Institute of Social and Economic History at the University of Linz.

Michael John 2011 – 2019 was also head of the Institute of Cultural Economics and Cultural Research (Institut für Kulturwirtschaft und Kulturforschung (KUWI) at the University of Linz).

He was also guest professor at the University of Salzburg (1992), at the Central European University Budapest (1995), the Slovenian Academy of Sciences and Arts Ljubljana (2001), and the University of Nova Gorica (School of Humanities, Cultural Studies) (2004).

== Research focuses ==
Michael John concentrated his historical research on several focuses, which he treated not only by scientific research, but also by Applied history, curating exhibitions on relevant themes. See here the main focuses:

- Nazism, Aryanization, Nazi plunder and its restitution, Forced labour under German rule during World War II

Michael John has conducted intensive research on Nazism, especially on the history of Aryanization, on aspects of Nazi plunder, with focus on plundered/ looted art and its restitution from the property of Austrian museums (see here John 2012b, John 2007a, John 2004a). Here he also studied aspects of forced labour under Nazi rule (see f.e. John 2012a). He curated an exhibition on the topic of forced labor (see exhibition 2014).

- Jewish history and Jewish migration in and from Central Europe

In the context of Nazism-research in Austria Michael John did studies on Jewish persecution and the History of Jews in Germany and in Austria 1933 - 1945 (see John 2021a, John 2014a). He did also investigations on general Jewish migration in the Austro-Hungarian Empire before 1918 (see here f.e. John 2011, John 1999a). Additionally he studied the emigration of Jewish people after the Holocaust and World War II to Israel, the United States and other areas (see here f.e. John 2002b). Here he curated (with Albert Lichtblau) an exhibition on the Righteous Among the Nations of Austria, exhibition 2015–2021.

- General Migration studies

Michael John did several studies on aspects of migration within and from Europe (see here f.e. John 2014b, John 1996a). He researched aspects of immigration to Vienna (see f.e. John 2019a, John 1990) and to Linz (see f.e. John 2000, John 1995) in the 19th and 20th century. Later he concentrated on Labour migration to Central Europe from a European "fringe" (like Yugoslavia, Greece, Italy or Turkey; (see f.e. John 2004b, John 2003). Here he also curated exhibitions, like „Gekommen und Geblieben: 50 Jahre Arbeitsmigration in OÖ. [They came and stayed: 50 years of labour migration in Upper Austria]“ (exhibition 2014–2018), "Crossing Borders" (exhibition 2004), or Migration - eine Zeitreise nach Europa [Migration - A Time Travel to Europe]

- Urban history

Here Michael John did research on the housing of lower/ working classes in Vienna around 1900 (see John 1982, John 1984), and studied the Demographic history of Linz as immigration city (see here John 2000, John 2015). This focus on Urban history was also the center of curating the 2021 Upper Austrian Federal State Exhibition [Oö. Landesausstellung 2021] in Steyr („Arbeit - Wohlstand - Macht“ [Work - Prosperity - Power]) co-curated by Michael John (see John 2021, exhibition 2021).

- Popular culture: Sports (especially Soccer), Consumer culture, Mobilities

Michael John worked here in several studies and publications primarily on the history and social meaning of Soccer in Austria and Germany (see f.e. John 2008, John 1997). He additionally did research on the history of Consumerism (see f.e. John 2010, John 2001a) and on the history of Mobilities. Here he curated an exhibition „Fussball: Geschichten & Geschichte [Soccer: stories and history]“ (exhibition 2008).

- History of Abuse in Youth Welfare, Childcare and Children's/ Youth homes in Austria

Michael John was member of several Austrian commissions of historians to examine child and youth abuse in Austrian children's and youth homes (Borstals, like Linz-Wegscheid, Steyr-Gleink, or Vienna, Schloss Wilhelminenberg#child abuse scandal) (see John 2006, John 2018). Here extensive and severe abuse of children and youngsters was proved. He also organized an exhibition in this context = Exhibition on the History of the Upper Austrian Youth Home in Linz-Wegscheid (exhibition 2006)

== Curated Exhibitions (a selection) ==
- 2021: „Arbeit - Wohlstand - Macht [Work - Prosperity - Power]“ (Curator and Scientific Head, with Herta Neiss), Oö. Landesausstellung [Upper Austrian Provincial Exhibition] 2021.
- 2015 – 2021: „Die Gerechten“. Courage ist eine Frage der Entscheidung [The Righteous Among the Nations. Courage is a Question of Decision-Making] (curated with Albert Lichtblau and Manfred Lindorfer); at several locations: Vienna, Linz, Steyr.
- 2014 – 2018: „Gekommen und Geblieben“. 50 Jahre Arbeitsmigration in Österreich ["They Came and Stayed". 50 Years of Labour Migration in Austria] (curated with Manfred Lindorfer und Marion Wisinger); at several locations in Upper Austria: Linz, Ried, Steyr and others.
- since 2014 (Cooperation as Member of the Commission "Forced labour in the VOEST"): „Gegen den Willen und fern der Heimat“. Zeitgeschichteausstellung 1938–1945 ["Aigainst Their Will and Far Away from Home". Contemporary History Exhibition 1938 - 1945], permanent exhibition, Linz: Corporate Headquarters of the VOEST Linz
- 2009: Stadt im Glück [City in Luck] (Scientific Cooperation and Co-Curator, with Thomas Philipp, Lydia Thanner, Andre Zogholy), Exhibition in the Linz City Museum Nordico], as part of the European Capital of Culture Linz 2009.
- 2008: „Fussball: Geschichten & Geschichte [Soccer: Stories and History]“ (main Curator), Exhibition in the Schlossmuseum Linz
- 2006: „WEGSCHEID - Von der Korrektionsbaracke zum sozialpädagogischen Jugendwohnheim“. Eine Ausstellung ["WEGSCHEID - from a Borstal Barrack to a Social Pedagogical Accommodation". An Exhibition] (main Curator), at several locations: Linz-Wegscheid and Hartheim (Upper Austria).
- 2004: „Crossing Borders“ (main Curator), Exhibition in the Museum Arbeitswelt Steyr
- 2003: Migration - eine Zeitreise nach Europa [Migration - A Time Travel to Europe] (Concept and Scientific Coordination, with Manfred Lindorfer), Exhibition in the Museum Arbeitswelt Steyr
- 1998: „Tradition - Innovation. Industrie im Wandel. Vergangenheit, Gegenwart, Zukunft“ [Tradition - Innovation. Manufacturing Industry through the Ages] (Scientific Head, together with Roman Sandgruber), Part of the Upper Austrian Provincial Exhibition 1998 („Land der Hämmer [Land of Sledges])“, in the former Reithoffer Factory, Steyr

== Publications (a selection) ==
Up to now (2022) Michael John has published 20 books as author, co-author, editor or co-editor, and more than 180 journal-articles/ book-contributions as author or co-author in German and English. Here a selection of 35 publications is noted:

- 2021b: Arbeit - Wohlstand - Macht. Oberösterreichische Landesausstellung Steyr 2021 [Work - Prosperity - Power. Upper Austrian Provincial Exhibition Steyr 2021] (ed. with Herta Neiss), Trauner Editors, Linz/A 2021, ISBN 978-3-99113-170-0.
- 2021a: „A Great Foundation with Unimaginable Development Opportunities“. The Rothschild Foundation for Nervous Patients in Vienna, in: Gabriele Kothbauer-Fritz and Tom Juncker (eds. for the Jewish Museum Vienna): The Vienna Rothschilds. A Thriller, Amalthea Editors, Vienna 2021, ISBN 978-3-99050-213-6, pp. 188–199.
- 2019b: (with Angela Wegscheider and Marion Wisinger): Verantwortung und Aufarbeitung. Untersuchung über Gründe und Bedingungen von Gewalt in Einrichtungen der Caritas der Diözese Linz nach 1945 [Responsibility and Reappraisal. Investigation of the Causes and Conditions of Violence in Caritas Borstals of the Diocese of Linz after 1945], Caritas of the Diocese of Linz (ed. Franz Kehrer), Linz/A 2019, ISBN 978-3-200-06611-3.
- 2019a: Zur Migration nach Wien in der Habsburgermonarchie. Nostalgie und Realität [Migration to Vienna during the Habsburg monarchy. Nostalgia and Reality], in: Senol Grasl-Akkilic, Marcus Schober and Regina Schober (eds.): Aspekte der österreichischen Migrationsgeschichte [Aspects of Austrian Migration history], Edition Atelier, Vienna 2019, ISBN 978-3-99065-015-8, pp. 60–97.
- 2018: Heimerziehung in Oberösterreich [Child and Youth Welfare Institutions (Borstals) in Upper Austria] (with Dieter Binder and Wolfgang Reder), Upper Austrian Federal Archive (Oö. Landesarchiv), Linz/A 2018, ISBN 978-3-902801-34-0.
- 2015: Vom nationalen Hort zur postmodernen City. Zur Migrations- und Identitätsgeschichte der Stadt Linz im 20. und 21. Jahrhundert [From National Shelter to Postmodern City. On the History of Migration and Urban Identity during the 20th and 21st Century in Linz], Archive of the city of Linz (Archiv der Stadt Linz), Linz/A 2015, ISBN 978-3-900388-62-1.
- 2014b: Migration in Austria, an Overview 1920s to 2000s, in: Johannes Feichtinger and Gary Cohen (eds.): Understanding Multiculturalism and the Habsburg Central European Experience, Berghahn Books, New York etc., ISBN 978-1-78238-264-5, pp. 122–157.
- 2014a: Dislocation, Trauma and Selective Memory. Recollections of Jewish Displaced Persons, in: Holocaust and Genocide Studies. A Journal of Culture and History (United States Holocaust Memorial Museum, Washington/DC), ISSN 1750-4902 (print); 2048-4887 (web), vol. 19 (2014), no. 3, pp. 73–104.
- 2012b: Die „Connection“ Bad Aussee - Berlin - Linz. Kunsthandel mit Folgen [The „Connection“ Bad Aussee - Berlin - Linz. Art-Dealing with Consequences], in: Eva Blimlinger and Monika Mayr (eds.): Kunst Sammeln, Kunst Handeln [Collecting and Dealing Art], Böhlau Editors, Vienna etc. 2012, ISBN 978-3-2057-8753-2, pp. 101–118.
- 2012a: Repression. Reconciliation. Removal? On the Past of the „Führer City Linz“, in: Andrea Bina and Lorenz Potocnik (eds.): Architecture in Linz 1900–2011, Ambra Editors, Vienna and New York 2012, ISBN 978-3-99043-433-8, pp. 113–116.
- 2011: Galician Jews in Austria in the 18th to the Early 20th Century, in: Klaus Bade, Pieter Emmer, Leo Lucassen and Jochen Oltmer (eds.): The Encyclopedia of Migration and Minorities in Europe. From the 17th Century to the Present, Cambridge University Press, Cambridge/UK 2011, ISBN 978-0-5117-8184-1, pp. 400–402.
- 2010: Jews as Consumers and Providers in Provincial Towns: The Example of Linz and Salzburg, Austria, 1900-1938, in: Gideon Reuveni and Nils Roemer (eds.): Longing, Belonging, and the Making of Jewish Consumer Culture, Brill Publ., Leiden/NL & Boston/USA 2010, ISBN 978-90-04-18603-3, pp. 141–164.
- 2008: „... wenn der Rasen brennt ...“ : 100 Jahre Fußball in Oberösterreich [″... when the Turf is Burning ...". 100 Years of Soccer in Upper Austria] (ed. with Franz Steinmassl), Steinmassl Editors, Gruenbach (Upper Austria) 2008, ISBN 978-3-902427-45-8.
- 2006: Ein „kultureller Code “? Antisemitismus im österreichischen Sport der Ersten Republik [A "Cultural Code"? Antisemitism in Austrian Sports during the Interwar period], in: Michael Brenner and Gideon Reuveni (eds.): Emanzipation durch Muskelkraft. Juden und Sport in Europa [Emancipation by Physical Strength. Jews and Sports in Europe], Brill Europe, Goettingen/BRD etc. 2006, ISBN 978-3-5255-6992-4, pp. 121–142.
- 2004b: Von Wien nach Hollywood - Erich von Stroheim und Josef von Sternberg [From Vienna to Hollywood: Erich von Stroheim and Josef von Sternberg, in: Eleonore Lappin-Epple (ed.): Jews and Film/ Juden und Film, Mandelbaum Editors, Vienna etc. 2004, ISBN 3-85476-127-9, pp. 2–13.
- 2004a: „Arisierungen“, beschlagnahmte Vermögen, Rückstellungen und Entschädigungen in Oberösterreich [„Aryanization“, Nazi plunder and Restitutions in Upper Austria] (with Daniela Ellmauer and Regina Thumser-Woehs), Oldenbourg, Vienna etc. 2004, ISBN 978-3-7029-0521-7.
- 2003b: National Movements and Imperial Ethnic Hegemonies in Austria 1867-1918, in: Dirk Hoerder, Christiane Harzig and Adrian Shubert (eds.): The Historical Practice of Diversity: Transcultural Interactions from the Early Modern Mediterranean to the Postcolonial World, Berghahn Books, New York etc. 2003, ISBN 978-1-571-81377-0, pp. 87–108.
- 2003a „Migration - eine Zeitreise nach Europa“ [Migration - A Time Journey to Europe] (ed. with Manfred Lindorfer), Exhibition catalogue = kursiv. eine kunst zeitschrift aus oberösterreich [also: kursiv - an art journal in Upper Austria], vol. 10 (2003), no. 1/2, no ISBN or ISSN.
- 2002b: Upper Austria, Intermediate Stop: Reception Camps and Housing Schemes for Jewish DPs and Refugees in Transit, in: Thomas Albrich and Ronald W. Zweig (eds.): Escape through Austria. Jewish Refugees and the Austrian Route to Palestine, Routledge, London etc. 2002, ISBN 978-0-714-68212-9, pp. 21–46.
- 2002a: (with Albert Lichtblau) The Synagogues in Linz and Salzburg, in: Jewish Central Europe - Past. Presence, Institut für Geschichte der Juden in Ôsterreich, Ausgabe 2002, Sankt Pölten 2002, pp. 70ff.
- 2001: Warenhaus und Massenkonsum. Zur Etablierung moderner Konsumkultur in der oberösterreichischen Landeshauptstadt im 19. und 20. Jahrhundert [Mass Consumption and Shopping Malls. On the Establishment of Modern Consumerism in the Upper Austrian Capital city from the 19th to the 20th Century], in: Herbert Kalb and Roman Sandgruber (eds.): Festschrift Rudolf Zinnhobler zum 70. Geburtstag ["Festschrift" for Rudolf Zinnhobler on his 70th Birthday], Trauner Editors, Linz 2001, ISBN 978-3-854-87258-0, pp. 97–120.
- 1999a: (with Albert Lichtblau): Jewries in Galicia and Bukovina, in Lemberg and Czernovitz. Two Divergent Examples of Jewish Communities in the Far East of the Austro-Hungarian Monarchy, in: Sander Gilman and Milton Shain (eds.): Jewries at the Frontiers, University of Illinois Press, Urbana & Chicago 1999, ISBN 0-252-06792-4, pp. 29–66.
- 1999b: „We Do Not Even Possess Our Selves“: On Identity and Ethnicity in Austria 1880 – 1937, in: Austrian History Yearbook (Minneapolis, Univ. of Minnesota, Center for Austrian Studies), ISSN 0067-2378 (print); 1558-5255 (web), Vol. 30 (1999), pp. 17–64.
- 1997: Österreich. Zur Kultur- und Sozialgeschichte des Fußballsports in Österreich [Austria: On the Cultural and Social History of Soccer in Austria], in: Christiane Eisenberg (ed.): Fußball, Soccer, Calcio. Ein englischer Sport auf seinem Weg um die Welt Soccer and Calcio. An English Sport Spreads around the World], dtb Publishers, Munich 1997, ISBN 3-423-04709-7, pp. 65–93.
- 1996b: „Straßenkrawalle und Exzesse“. Formen des sozialen Protests der Unterschichten in Wien 1880 – 1918 ["Street Riots and Excesses". Forms of Social Protest of Lower classes in Vienna 1880-1918], in: Gerhard Melinz and Susan Zimmermann (eds.): Wien, Prag, Budapest. Blütezeit der Habsburgmetropolen: Urbanisierung, Kommunalpolitik, gesellschaftliche Konflikte (1867-1918) [Vienna, Prague, Budapest. Blooming Period aof Habsburg Metropolises ... 18^^^^^^67 - 1918], Promedia Edition, Vienna 1996, ISBN 3-853-71101-4, pp. 230–244.
- 1996a: Push and Pull Factors for Oversea Migrants from Austria-Hungary in the 19th and 20th Centuries, in: Franz Szabo (ed.): Austrian Immigration to Canada. Selected Essays, McGill-Queen's University Press, Ottawa 1996, ISBN 978-088-629281-2, pp. 55–82.
- 1995: Displaced Persons in Linz. 'Versetzte Personen' und Flüchtlinge der Nachkriegszeit [Displaced Persons and Refugees in Linzin the Post World-War II Period], in: Willibald Katzinger and Fritz Mayrhofer (eds.): Prinzip Hoffnung - Linz zwischen Befreiung und Freiheit [Principles of Hope - Linz between Liberation and Freedom], Linz City Museum „Nordico“ Catalogues, Linz/A 1995, pp. 213–230.
- 1994: The Austrian Labor Movement 1867 - 1914: Plebeian protest, Working-Class Struggles and the Nationality Question, in: Dirk Hoerder and Horst Roessler (eds.): Roots of the Transplanted, vol. 2: Plebians Culture, Class and Politics in the Life of Labor Migrants, Columbia Univ. Press, New York etc. 1994, ISBN 0-880-33288-3, pp. 100–132.
- 1990: Schmelztiegel Wien - einst und jetzt. Geschichte und Gegenwart der Zuwanderung nach Wien [Melting Pot Vienna. On the History and Presence of Immigration in Vienna] (with Albert Lichtblau]), Böhlau Editors, Vienna etc. 1990, ISBN 3-205-98106-5.
- 1989: Angst, Kooperation und Widerstand. Die autochthonen Minderheiten Österreichs 1938-1945 [Fear, Cooperation and Resistance. Autochthoneous Minorities in Austria 1938 - 1945], in: Zeitgeschichte, ISSN 0945-537X, vol. 17, no. 2 (November 1989), pp. 66–89.
- 1988: Zuwanderung in Österreich 1848-1914. Zu ökonomisch und psychologisch bedingten Faktoren der Zuwanderung [Immigration in Austria 1848 - 1914: Economical and Psychological Factors], in: Archiv. Jahrbuch des Vereins für Geschichte der Arbeiterbewegung, Vienna 1988, pp. 102–132.
- 1986: Obdachlosigkeit - Massenerscheinung und Unruheherd im Wien der Spätgründerzeit Homelessness - Mass Phenomenon and Trouble Spot in the Viennese Late Gründerzeit], in: Hubert Ch. Ehalt, Gernot Heiß and Hannes Stekl (eds.): Glücklich ist, wer vergisst ...? Das andere Wien um 1900 [Happy is He who Forgets ...? The other Vienna around 1900], Böhlau Editors, Vienna etc. 1986, ISBN 3-205-08857-3, pp. 173–195.
- 1984: Wohnverhältnisse sozialer Unterschichten im Wien Kaiser Franz Josephs [Housing Circumstances of Lower Class People in the Vienna of Franz Joseph], Europa Publishers, Vienna 1984, ISBN 3-203-50870-2.
- 1982: Hausherrenmacht und Mieterelend. Wohnverhältnisse und Wohnerfahrung der Unterschichten in Wien 1890 - 1923 Landlord Power and Tenant's Hardships. Housing Situation and Experiences of Lower Classes in Vienna 1890 - 1923], Gesellschaftskritik Publishers, Vienna 1982, ISBN 3-900-35117-1.
