= Monographic series =

Continuous collective works of writings

Monographic series (alternatively, monographs in series) are scholarly and scientific books released in successive volumes, each of which is structured like a separate book or scholarly monograph.

== Semantics ==
In general, books that are released serially (in successive parts) once a year, or less often, are called series. Publications that are released more often than once a year are known as periodicals. If the volumes can each stand on their own as a separate book, they are called monographs in series; if not, they are called "book sets".

Examples include Oxford Historical Monographs and Annals of Mathematics Studies.

== Categorization ==
Libraries and indexing services handle them in various ways. The Library of Congress catalogs each part of them as an individual book with an individual call number and ISBN and a series note (technically a series added entry for the overall series, which has its ISSN, and usually a call number. As the Library of Congress receives two copies of most scholarly books as copyright deposits, it normally keeps one by individual call number and one by series call number. Most other libraries do not have that luxury and have to choose. The Anglo-American Cataloging Rules 2nd edition allows either of these options to be used.

Medical libraries almost always keep them together as a series. The biomedical indexing service PubMed from the National Library of Medicine treat the individual volumes in such a series as if they were volumes in a journal.

== See also ==
- Book series
- Collection (publishing)
- Serials, periodicals and journals
- Academic publishing
- Edited volume
