= Ottoline Leyser =

English botanist (born 1965)

Dame Ottoline Leyser DBE FRS
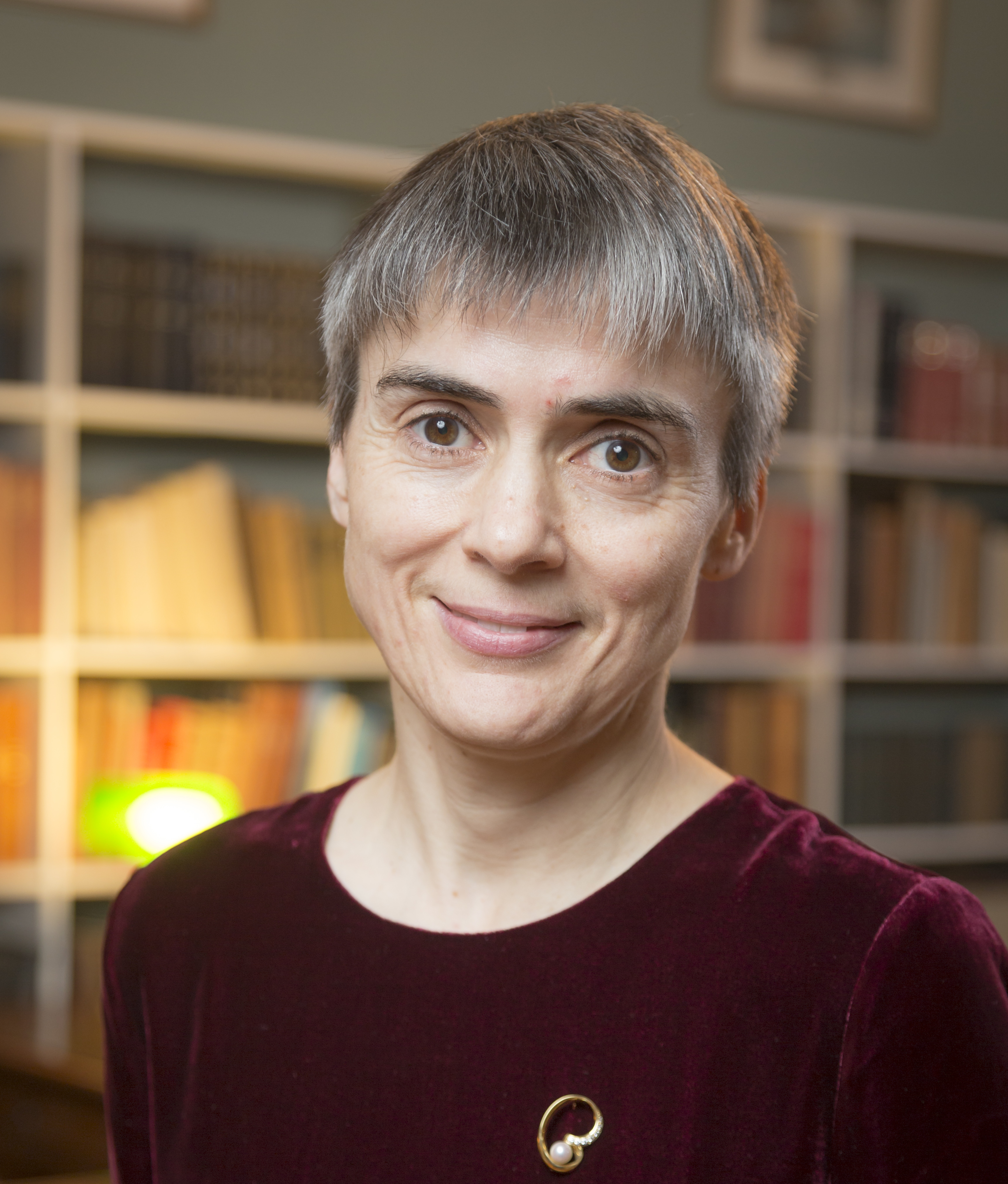
- Leyser in 2016
- Born: Henrietta Miriam Ottoline Leyser; 7 March 1965 (age 61); Bicester, Oxfordshire, England
- Education: Wychwood School
- Alma mater: University of Cambridge (BA, PhD)
- Known for: GARNet: Genomic Arabidopsis Resource Network
- Spouse: Stephen John Day (m. 1986)
- Children: 2
- Parents: Karl Leyser; Henrietta Leyser
- Awards: Rosalind Franklin Award (2007); Genetics Society Medal (2016); EMBO Member (2017); Foreign Associate of the National Academy of Sciences (2012)
- Scientific career
- Fields: Plant Developmental Biology
- Institutions: Indiana University Bloomington; University of York; University of Cambridge; UK Research and Innovation
- Thesis: An analysis of fasciated mutants of Arabidopsis thaliana and the role of cytokinin in this phenotype (1990)
- Website: www.slcu.cam.ac.uk/people/leyser-ottoline

Dame Henrietta Miriam Ottoline Leyser DBE FRS (born 7 March 1965) is a British plant biologist and Regius Professor of Botany at the University of Cambridge. From 2013 to 2020 she was the director of the Sainsbury Laboratory, Cambridge. From 2020 to 2025 she was CEO of UK Research and Innovation (UKRI).

== Education ==
Leyser's birth was registered in Ploughley, Oxfordshire. She was educated at Wychwood School in Oxford and the University of Cambridge as an undergraduate student of Newnham College, where she received her Bachelor of Arts degree in Natural Sciences in 1986 followed by a PhD in Genetics in 1990 for research supervised by Ian Furner.

== Research and career ==
Leyser's postdoctoral research at Indiana University preceded a lectureship at the University of York, where she worked from 1994 to 2010. She then took part in the formation of the independently funded Sainsbury Laboratory at Cambridge, and was that institute's director from 2013 to 2020. Leyser's research interests are in the genetics of plant development and the interaction of plant hormones with the environment.

For a time around 2019, Leyser chaired the Centre for Science and Policy Management Committee at Cambridge. In 2020 she was appointed the Chief Executive of UK Research and Innovation, the body which directs government funding towards research and innovation. She was elected Regius Professor of Botany at Cambridge in the same year.

=== Awards and honours ===
Leyser was elected a Fellow of the Royal Society (FRS) in 2007. Her nomination reads:

Ottoline Leyser has made unique and central contributions to understanding of development. The focus of her work has been plant hormones, notably auxin, and her identification of the auxin receptor solved a classic problem in biology. She isolated several of the key mutants and has elucidated downstream pathways of hormone action, using this knowledge to characterise the control of shoot architecture. She played a world-leading role in promoting Arabidopsis as a key model organism in modern biology and has provided leadership to the Arabidopsis research community through the resource network GARNet.

Leyser was appointed Commander of the Order of the British Empire (CBE) in the 2009 New Year Honours. She was a member of the Nuffield Council on Bioethics from 2009 to 2015, and a member of the Council's Working Party on Biofuels (2009–2011).

Leyser was elected a foreign associate of the US National Academy of Sciences in 2012. She has been a Member of the German Academy of Sciences Leopoldina since 2014. In 2016, she was awarded an honorary doctorate by the Norwegian University of Science and Technology (NTNU). Other honours include the Society of Experimental Biology’s President’s Medal (2000), the Royal Society's Rosalind Franklin Award (2007), the International Plant Growth Substance Association’s Silver Medal (2010), and the UK Genetic Society Medal (2016, which recognises outstanding contributions to genetics research). In 2020, Leyser was awarded The Waddington Medal from the British Society for Developmental Biology, awarded for major contributions to developmental biology in the United Kingdom.

Leyser was appointed Dame Commander of the Order of the British Empire (DBE) in the 2017 New Year Honours for services to plant science, science in society, and equality and diversity in science. That same year, she received the Women in Science Award from the European Molecular Biology Organization (EMBO) and the Federation of European Biochemical Societies (FEBS).

== Personal life ==
Leyser is the daughter of the historians Henrietta Leyser and Karl Leyser. She married Stephen John Day in 1986 and has one son and one daughter.

She has twice been a guest of Jim Al-Khalili on the BBC Radio 4 programme The Life Scientific. In 2005 she was interviewed on NPR about auxin and TIR1. In 2023 she was a guest of Michael Berkeley on Private Passions.
