= John Nightingale (academic) =

British academic

- Born: John Bartholomew Wakelyn Nightingale; 7 September 1960 (age 66)
- Occupations: Historian and academic

Academic background
- Education: Winchester College
- Alma mater: Magdalen College, Oxford; Merton College, Oxford
- Thesis: Monasteries and their patrons in the dioceses of Trier, Metz and Toul, circa 850-1000 (1988)
- Doctoral advisor: Karl Leyser

Academic work
- Discipline: History
- Sub-discipline: Middle Ages; Church history; Carolingian Empire; Lotharingia
- Institutions: Magdalen College, Oxford

John Bartholomew Wakelyn Nightingale, Baron of Cromarty (born 7 September 1960) is a British academic. He is Associate Professor of Medieval History at the University of Oxford, and Tutorial Fellow in History at Magdalen College.

== Biography ==
Nightingale was born 7 September 1960. He is married to Lucy Fergusson, a partner at Linklaters LLP.

He was educated at Winchester College, Winchester, Hampshire, England and also graduated from Magdalen College, Oxford, with a Master of Arts and later with a Doctor of Philosophy (D.Phil.). At Merton College, Oxford, he was the Harmsworth Senior Research Scholar between 1984 and 1986, and was a British Academy Postdoctoral Fellow from 1989 to 1992. In 1986, he became a Fellow of Magdalen College and later, from 1993, a Tutor of Modern History. He was Assessor of the University of Oxford from 2008 to 2009 and a member of its governing council from 2008 to 2014. He is the current Baron of Cromarty in the Baronage of Scotland.

== Bibliography ==
- Hidden Magdalen (2008) (associate editor)
- Monasteries and Patrons in the Gorze Reform: Lotharingia c.850-1000 (Oxford: Oxford University Press, 2001)
- 'Oswald, Fleury and Continental Reform', in Nicholas Brooks and Catherine Cubitt, eds., St Oswald of Worcester: Life and Influence (London and New York: Leicester University Press, 1996), pp. 23-45
- 'Bishop Gerard of Toul (963-94) and Attitudes to Episcopal Office', in Timothy Reuter, ed., Warriors and Churchmen in the High Middle Ages: Essays Presented to Karl Leyser (London: Hambledon Press, 1992), pp. 41-62

Baronage of Scotland
| Preceded by Michael Nightingale (father) | Baron of Cromarty; 1998-present | Succeeded by Incumbent |
