= Henry Longueville Mansel =

British philosopher and priest

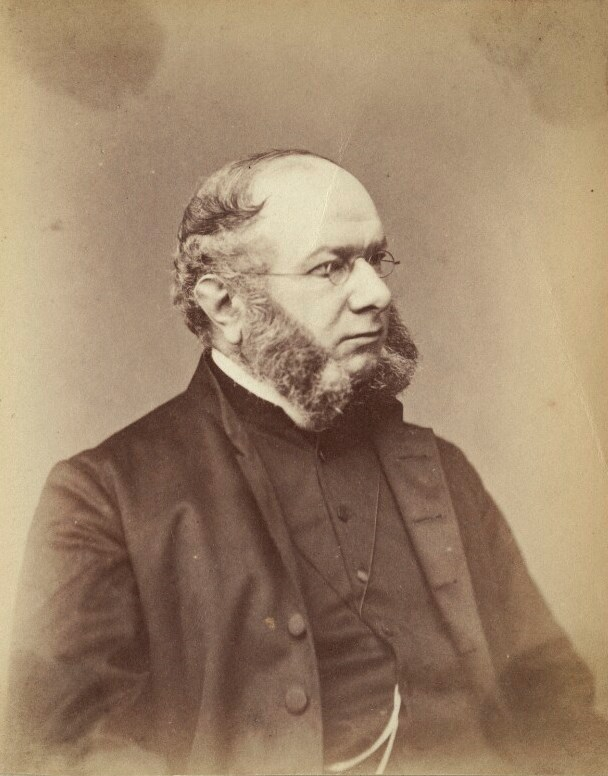
Henry Longueville Mansel

Henry Longueville Mansel (6 October 1820 – 30 July 1871) was an English philosopher and ecclesiastic.

== Life ==
He was born at Cosgrove, Northamptonshire (where his father, also Henry Longueville Mansel, fourth son of General John Mansel, was rector). He was educated at Merchant Taylors' School, London and St John's College, Oxford. He took a double first in 1843, and became tutor of his college. He was appointed reader in moral and metaphysical philosophy at Magdalen College in 1855, and Waynflete Professor of Metaphysical Philosophy in 1859. He was a great opponent of university reform and of the Hegelianism which was then beginning to take root in Oxford. In 1867 he succeeded Arthur Penrhyn Stanley as Regius Professor of Ecclesiastical History, and in 1868 he was appointed dean of St Paul's. He died in Cosgrove on the first of July 1871.

== Work ==
The philosophy of Mansel, like that of Sir William Hamilton, was mainly due to Aristotle, Immanuel Kant and Thomas Reid. Like Hamilton, Mansel maintained the purely formal character of logic, the duality of consciousness as testifying to both self and the external world, and the limitation of knowledge to the finite and "conditioned." His doctrines were developed in his edition of Aldrich's Artis logicae rudimenta (1849) – his chief contribution to the reviving study of Aristotle – and in his Prolegomena logica: an Inquiry into the Psychological Character of Logical Processes (1851, 2nd ed. enlarged 1860), in which the limits of logic as the "science of formal thinking" are rigorously determined.

In his Bampton lectures on The Limits of Religious Thought (1858, 5th ed. 1867; Danish trans. 1888) he applied to Christian theology the metaphysical agnosticism which seemed to result from Kant's criticism, and which had been developed in Hamilton's Philosophy of the Unconditioned. While denying all knowledge of the supersensuous, Mansel deviated from Kant in contending that cognition of the ego as it really belongs among the facts of experience. Consciousness, he held – agreeing thus with the doctrine of "natural realism" which Hamilton developed from Reid – implies knowledge both of self and of the external world. The latter Mansel's psychology reduces to consciousness of our organism as extended; with the former is given consciousness of free will and moral obligation.

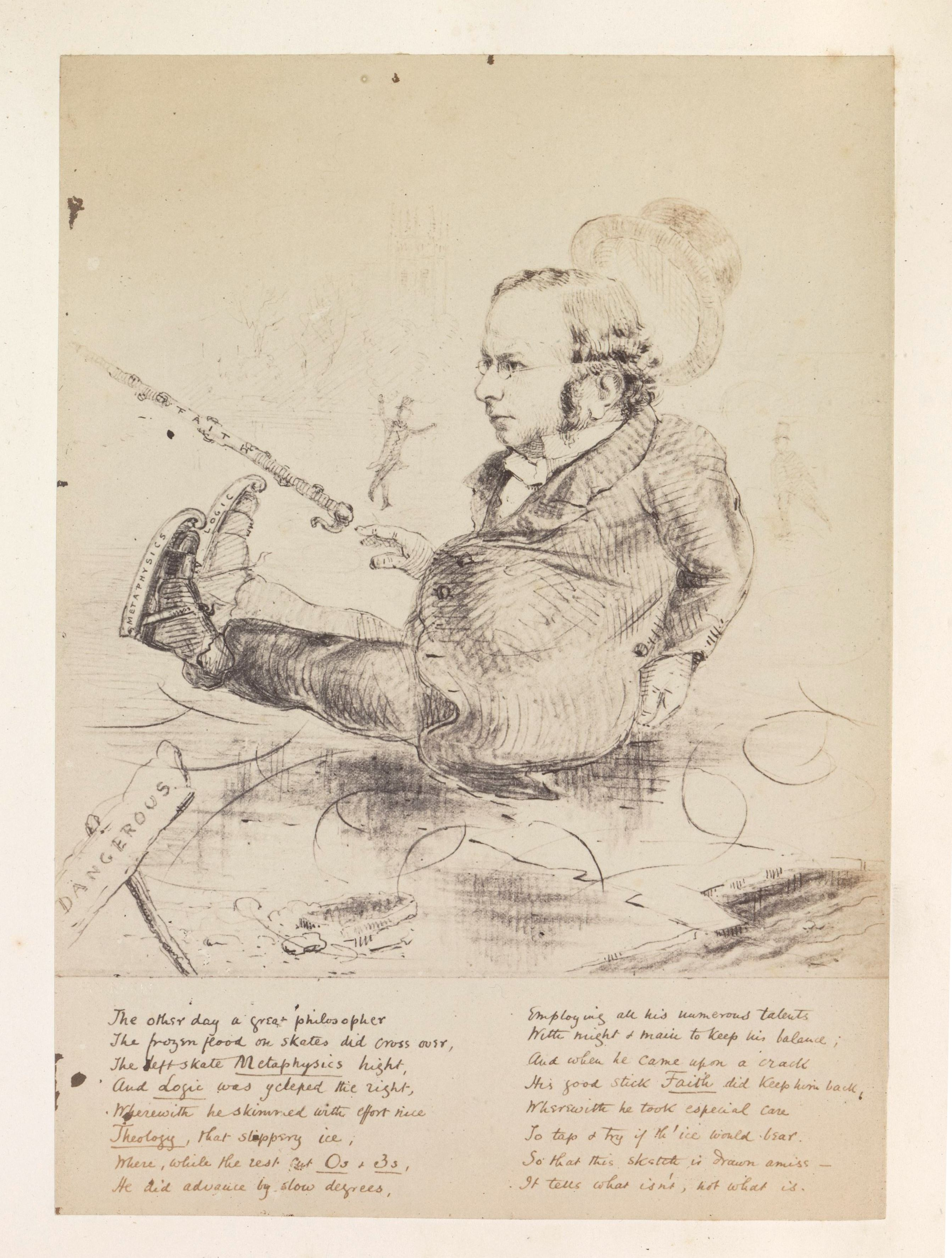
Caricature of Mansel

These lectures led Mansel to a bitter controversy with the Christian socialist theologian Frederick Maurice.

A summary of Mansel's philosophy is contained in his article "Metaphysics" in the 5th edition of the Encyclopædia Britannica (1860). He also wrote

- "Metaphysics or the Philosophy of Consciousness Phenomenal and Real" (4th ed., 1883), 408pps, Edinburgh, Adam and Charles Black
- The Philosophy of the Conditioned (1866) in reply to John Stuart Mill's criticism of Hamilton;
- Letters, Lectures, and Reviews (ed. Chandler, 1873),
- The Gnostic Heresies of the First and Second Centuries (ed. Joseph Barber Lightfoot, 1875, with a biographical sketch by Lord Carnarvon).

He contributed a commentary on the first two gospels to the Speaker's Commentary (1881).

Mansel's mother, Maria, was the daughter of Admiral Sir Robert Moorsom.

== Notes ==
Academic offices
| Preceded by Walter Waddington Shirley | Regius Professor of Ecclesiastical History; 1866–1868 | Succeeded by William Bright |
Church of England titles
| Preceded by Henry Hart Milman | Dean of St Paul's; 1868–1871 | Succeeded by Richard William Church |
