= Claude Jenkins =

Claude Jenkins (1877–1959) was an Anglican clergyman, theologian and historian.

== Biography ==
He became Canon of Christ Church and Regius Professor of Ecclesiastical Historyat Oxford University in 1934. He was Lambeth Librarian from 1910 until 1952.

He was famous for collecting books, having an estimated 30,000 at the time of his death:

His sole extravagance was the purchase of books, of which at his death he had, I believe, thirty thousand. He spent his vacations at either Malvern or Tunbridge Wells, in both of which towns there were secondhand bookshops of which he must have been one of the principal customers. Shortly after his return at the beginning of each term several crates full of spoils would be delivered at his lodging; many of these remained unpacked to the time of his death, for they had simply overwhelmed him. Many of them were the kind of books — Victorian parish histories and the like — which one can hardly imagine anyone wanting but which, if anyone did want them, it might be impossible to find. In spite of its size the house was inadequate to accommodate them; in the corners of each room piles of books were thrown down anyhow like sand in the corner of a builder's yard, and the bath, which was not used for its normal purpose, was a kind of dump for odd printed scraps. It was only just possible to push one's way up the staircase, for on every step there were piles of books extending high out of reach; in fact the view of the staircase-wall reminded me of a sectional diagram of geological strata in an atlas, and one could see how the conformation had readjusted itself after a cataclysm had occurred through a removal of the book from one of its lower levels. He was very indignant at the suggestion that books were ever stolen from libraries and insisted that apparent thefts were in fact cases of absent-mindedness; this may be true to some extent, for it would be absurd to give any other explanation for the books which were found in his house after his death. He once showed me a book which contained the plate of a well-known library and in which he had inserted a signed declaration that he had bought it in a shop and not stolen it from the library; otherwise, he said, someone doing research would defame him posthumously. I remarked that I thought this a very poor safeguard, since anyone suspecting him of theft would be equally ready to accuse him of perjury.

— E. L. Mascall, Saraband: The Memoirs of E. L. Mascall, (Leominster: Gracewing, 1992; rpt. 1995), pp. 219–220, Laudator Temporis Acti
