= Charles Bigg =

English clergyman, theologian and church historian

Charles Bigg (12 September 1840, Higher Broughton, near Manchester – 15 July 1908, Oxford) was a Church of England clergyman, theologian and church historian.

== Life ==
Bigg was educated at Manchester Grammar School and Corpus Christi College, Oxford (BA 1862, MA 1864). There he won the Hertford Prize for Latin, the Ireland Scholarship, and the Gaisford Prize for Greek Prose (1861). He became deacon in 1863, priest in 1864. He was a second classical master at Cheltenham College (1865–1871) and then Principal of Brighton College (1871–1881). He was senior student of Christ Church College. In 1881 he returned to Corpus Christi College as chaplain.

In 1886, he delivered the Bampton Lectures, later published as The Christian Platonists of Alexandria (1886). In 1900 he was invited by the Bishop of London, Mandell Creighton, to a round table conference that produced The Doctrine of Holy Communion and its Expression in Ritual in 1900.

After the death of Reverend William Bright, he was in April 1901 appointed Regius Professor of Ecclesiastical History at the University of Oxford, holding the post until his death.

== Works ==
In the earlier part of his life, Bigg produced school editions of Greek historians Thucydides (1868) and Xenophon (1880s). His most significant works are The Christian Platonists of Alexandria (1886) and Neoplatonism (1895).

=== List of works ===
- Thucydides. The history of the war between the Peloponnesians and Athenians, Books I, II. Edited, with notes and introduction. Rivingstons, 1868.
- Xenophon. Cyropaedia. With introduction and notes. Oxford (Clarendon Press Series)
  - Book I. Part I: Introduction and text. Part II: Notes. 1888 . 2nd edition 1898 .
  - Books IV, V. 2nd ed. 1886
- The Christian Platonists of Alexandria : Eight lectures preached before the University of Oxford in the year 1886 on the foundation of the late Rev. John Bampton (1886)
- Neoplatonism (1895)
- The imitation of Christ : called also The ecclesiastical music (1900). Translated by Bigg.
- A critical and exegetical commentary on the Epistles of St. Peter and St. Jude (1901)
- The church's task under the Roman empire; four lectures with preface, notes, and an excursus (1905)
- Wayside sketches in ecclesiastical history; nine lectures (1906)
- The origins of Christianity (1909)
- The doctrine of the twelve Apostles (1922)

== Sources ==
- W.R. Inge. Charles Bigg / The Journal of Theological Studies, Issue 37, October 1908, Pages 1–2.
- Clark, Andrew (1912). "Bigg, Charles" . In Lee, Sidney (ed.). Dictionary of National Biography (2nd supplement). Vol. 1. London: Smith, Elder & Co. pp. 162–163.
