= Henry Mayr-Harting =

20th-century British historian of the Middle Ages

Professor Henry Mayr-Harting FBA
- Born: Henry Maria Robert Egmond Mayr-Harting; 6 April 1936 (age 90); Prague, Czech Republic
- Occupations: Historian and academic
- Title: Regius Professor of Ecclesiastical History
- Spouse: Caroline Humphries (m. 1968)
- Children: 2
- Relatives: Thomas Mayr-Harting (brother)

Academic background
- Education: Douai School
- Alma mater: Merton College, Oxford
- Thesis: The bishops of Chichester and the administration of their diocese, 1075-1207: with a collection of acta (1961)

Academic work
- Institutions: University of Liverpool; St Peter's College, Oxford; Christ Church, Oxford
- Doctoral students: Conrad Leyser

Henry Maria Robert Egmont Mayr-Harting (born 6 April 1936) is a British medieval ecclesiastical historian. From 1997 to 2003, he was Regius Professor of Ecclesiastical History at the University of Oxford and a lay canon of Christ Church, Oxford.

== Early life and education ==
Mayr-Harting was born on 6 April 1936 in Prague. He is the son of Herbert Mayr-Harting, a lawyer who was the Czechoslovak representative at the United Nations War Crimes Commission, and of Anna Mayr-Harting, née Münzer, who had a distinguished career as a bacteriologist in Bristol, England. His brother, Thomas Mayr-Harting, is an Austrian and EU diplomat.

Mayr-Harting was educated at Douai School and Merton College, Oxford (BA 1957, MA 1961, DPhil 1961, DD 2004).

== Career ==
Mayr-Harting was lecturer in medieval history at the University of Liverpool 1960–68. He then returned to Oxford to become Fellow and Tutor in Medieval History at St Peter's College from 1968 until 1997, when he was appointed Fellow Emeritus. From 1976 until 1997 he was also lecturer in medieval history at Merton College. In the 1970s Mayr-Harting served as Admissions Tutor for St Peter's College and in the early 1980s as Chair of the Faculty Board for the Faculty of History.

Mayr-Harting was Slade Professor of Fine Art for the academic year 1987–88 and in 1993 he was named university reader in medieval history. In 1997 he became the first Roman Catholic and the first layperson to be appointed Regius Professor of Ecclesiastical History in the University of Oxford and consequently he became the first lay canon of Christ Church Cathedral. He retired from these positions in 2003.

Mayr-Harting was elected Visiting Fellow of Peterhouse, Cambridge, in 1983 and Brown Foundation Fellow at Sewanee: The University of the South in 1992. He was elected a Fellow of the British Academy in the same year and he is a corresponding member of the Austrian Academy of Sciences. He was the president of the Ecclesiastical History Society (2001–02). In 2003 he took part in the Spring Lecture Series, Barbarian Europe: The Creation of a Civilization, at the Institute for Medieval Studies, University of New Mexico. Hon. D.Litt., University of East Anglia, 2009.

Mayr-Harting is the current president of the Henry Bradshaw Society.

== Personal life ==
In 1968 Mayr-Harting married Caroline Mary Humphries. Together they have a son, Felix (born 1969), and a daughter, Ursula (born 1972). Mayr-Harting's daughter, now called Ursula Weekes, is an art historian and has written several books, including Techniques of Drawing (exh. cat., Oxford: Ashmolean Museum, 1996), Early Netherlandish Engraving circa 1440–1540 (Oxford: Ashmolean Museum, 1997), Techniques of Drawing: from the 15th to the 19th Centuries (Oxford: Ashmolean Museum, 1999), and Early Engravers and their Public: the Master of the Berlin Passion and Manuscripts from Convents in the Rhine-Maas Region (London: Harvey Miller, 2004).

== Selected publications ==
- Henry Mayr-Harting, The Bishops of Chichester and the Administration of Their Diocese, 1075–1207: with a Collection of Acta (University of Oxford DPhil thesis, 1961)
- Widukind of Corvey, Res gestae Saxonicae, tr. Henry Mayr-Harting (typescript 1962, privately bound 1995)
- Henry Mayr-Harting, The Bishops of Chichester, 1075–1207: Biographical Notes and Problems (Chichester: Chichester City Council, 1963)
- Henry Mayr-Harting, ed. and introduction, Diocesis Cicestrensis: The Acta of the Bishops of Chichester, 1075–1207 (Canterbury and York Society, vol. 56, Torquay: Devonshire Press, 1964)
- Henry Mayr-Harting, The Coming of Christianity to Anglo-Saxon England (London: B.T. Batsford, 1972; London: Book Club Associates, 1977; 3rd edn, London: Batsford; University Park: Pennsylvania State University Press, 1991) ISBN 978-0-271-00769-4
- Henry Mayr-Harting, 'Functions of a Twelfth-Century Recluse', History 60 (1975), 337–52
- Henry Mayr-Harting, The Venerable Bede, the Rule of St Benedict, and Social Class (Jarrow Lecture 1976, Jarrow: Rector of Jarrow, 1976) ISBN 0-903495-03-1
- Henry Mayr-Harting and R. I. Moore, eds, Studies in Medieval History Presented to R. H. C. Davis (London: Hambledon Press, 1985)
- Henry Mayr-Harting, Saint Wilfrid (London: Catholic Truth Society, 1986)
- Henry Mayr-Harting, ed., St Hugh of Lincoln: Lectures Delivered at Oxford and Lincoln to Celebrate the Eighth Centenary of St Hugh's Consecration as Bishop of Lincoln (Oxford: Clarendon Press, 1987)
- Henry Mayr-Harting, 'The Foundation of Peterhouse, Cambridge (1284) and the Rule of Saint Benedict', English Historical Review 103 (1988), 318
- Henry Mayr-Harting, Ottonian Book Illumination: an Historical Study (2 vols, London: Harvey Miller, 1991; 2nd edn, London: Harvey Miller, 1999) ISBN 978-1-872501-79-6
- Henry Mayr-Harting, Two conversions to Christianity: the Bulgarians and the Anglo-Saxons (Stenton Lecture 1993, Reading: University of Reading, 1994)
- Henry Mayr-Harting, 'Charlemagne, the Saxons, and the Imperial Coronation of 800', English Historical Review 111:444 (November 1996), 1113–33
- Henry Mayr-Harting, Perceptions of Angels in History: an Inaugural Lecture Delivered in the University of Oxford on 14 November 1997 (Oxford: Clarendon Press, 1998)
- Henry Mayr-Harting, 'Liudprand of Cremona's Account of his Legation to Constantinople (968) and Ottonian Imperial Strategy', English Historical Review 116 (2001) 539
- Richard Harries and Henry Mayr-Harting, eds, Christianity: Two Thousand Years (Oxford: Oxford University Press, 2001)
- Henry Mayr-Harting, 'The Uta Codex: Art, Philosophy, and Reform in Eleventh-Century Germany', Catholic Historical Review 88:4 (October 2002), 759–61
- Henry Mayr-Harting, Melbourne Church in its Earliest Historical Surroundings: the Friends First Public Lecture (Melbourne: Friends of Melbourne Parish Church, 2004)
- Henry Mayr-Harting, Church and Cosmos in Early Ottonian Germany: The View from Cologne (Oxford: Oxford University Press, 2007) ISBN 978-0-19-921071-8
- Henry Mayr-Harting, Religion, Politics and Society in Britain 1066–1272 (London: Longman, 2011)

== Sources and further reading ==
- Henry Mayr-Harting, 'The Relevance of Medieval History', History Faculty Alumni Newsletter 2 (June 2004)
- Henry Mayr-Harting, 'Much more than "ornament"', Cherwell (16 May 2003)
- Faculty of Modern History
- Austrian Academy of Sciences
- University of New Mexico
- Lawrence University
- Oxford University Gazette (6 March 1997)

Academic offices
Preceded by Peter Hinchliff	Regius Professor of Ecclesiastical History; 1997–2003	Succeeded by Sarah Foot
