= Michael Ramsey Professor of Anglican Studies =

The Michael Ramsey Professor of Anglican Studies is a professorship or chair in the Department of Theology and Religion at Durham University. The chair is named in honour of Archbishop Michael Ramsey, a former academic of the university and holder of the Van Mildert Professor of Divinity.

The holder of the Michael Ramsey chair, which is jointly funded by the university and Durham Cathedral, is also a residential canon at the cathedral and member of its Chapter, thus one of the requirements of post holder is to be an Anglican priest or a minister in another church in communion with Church of England or a lay canon. As a Canon Professor the holder is appointed by the Bishop of Durham on the recommendation of a board of electors.

The current Michael Ramsey Professor of Anglican Studies is Michael Snape, who took up the appointment in 2015.

== List of Michael Ramsey professors ==
- Canon Professor Michael Snape (2015 – present); ecumenical lay canon of Durham Cathedral
