= Robert Hussey =

English churchman

Robert Hussey (1801–1856) was an English churchman and academic, professor of ecclesiastical history at Oxford.

== Life ==
Born on 7 October 1801, he was fourth son of William Hussey, rector of Sandhurst, near Hawkhurst in Kent. For a time at Rochester grammar school, in 1814 he was sent to Westminster School, in 1816 became a king's scholar, and in 1821 was elected to Christ Church, Oxford. There he resided for the remainder of his life. He obtained a double first-class in the Bachelor of Arts examination, Michaelmas 1824, and proceeded a Master of Arts in 1827 and a Bachelor of Divinity in 1837.

After a few years spent in private tuition, Hussey was appointed one of the college tutors, and held the post until he became censor in 1835. He was appointed select preacher before the university in 1831 and again in 1846. He was proctor in 1836, in which year he was an unsuccessful candidate for the head-mastership of Harrow School. In 1838 he was appointed one of the classical examiners at Oxford, and from 1841 to 1843 was one of the preachers at the Royal Chapel, Whitehall.

In 1842 Hussey gave up his college duties on his appointment to the newly founded regius professorship of ecclesiastical history. the canonry of Christ Church later attached to the professorship was not then vacant, a salary was paid by the university. In 1845 Hussey was presented by the dean and chapter of Christ Church to the perpetual curacy of Binsey. He was subsequently appointed rural dean by Bishop Samuel Wilberforce, and was elected one of the proctors in convocation for the diocese of Oxford.

In 1854, when the new hebdomadal council was appointed, Hussey was chosen one of the professorial members. He died rather suddenly of heart disease on 2 December 1856. To the dean and chapter of Christ Church he bequeathed the ecclesiastical history and patristic theology works of his library, for the use of his successors in the chair.

== Works ==
For the benefit of his students, Hussey edited the histories of Socrates of Constantinople (1844), Evagrius Scholasticus (1844), Bede (1846), and Sozomen (3 vols. finished after his death, 1860). In a volume of Sermons, mostly Academical (Oxford, 1849), he published a Preface containing a Refutation of the Theory founded upon the Syriac Fragments of three of the Epistles of St. Ignatius, then recently discovered and published by William Cureton. His conclusion, later generally adopted, was that these fragments of the Ignatian Epistles contain only certain extracts from the Epistles, and not the whole text. In 1851, at the time of Universalis Ecclesiae he published a manual on The Rise of the Papal Power traced in Three Lectures (reissued, with additions, in 1863).

Hussey was opposed to the Oxford Movement but was not partisan. He issued a pamphlet in February 1845 containing Reasons for Voting upon the Third Question to be proposed in Convocation on the 13th inst., in which he argued the unreasonableness of the proposal to condemn Tract 90 a second time, four years after its first appearance. He wrote also An Essay on the Ancient Weights and Money and the Roman and Greek Liquid Measures; with an Appendix on the Roman and Greek Foot, Oxford, 1836, based on examination of ancient coins.

== Family ==
Hussey married Elizabeth Ley, sister of his friend and contemporary at Christ Church, the Rev. Jacob Ley. She survived him with one daughter. His eldest sister, Charlotte Sutherland, gave to the Bodleian Library in 1837 a large collection of historical prints and drawings.

== Notes ==
Attribution

This article incorporates text from a publication now in the public domain: Lee, Sidney, ed. (1891). "Hussey, Robert". Dictionary of National Biography. Vol. 28. London: Smith, Elder & Co.
