= John McManners =

British historian (1916–2006)

The Reverend John McManners CBE FBA FAHA
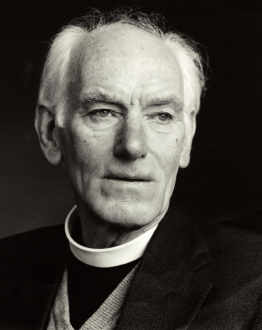
- Born: 25 December 1916; Ferryhill, England
- Died: 4 November 2006 (aged 89); Oxford, England
- Other name: Jack McManners
- Spouse: Sarah Errington (m. 1951)
- Children: 4, including Hugh McManners
- Awards: Ordre national du Mérite (2001)

Ecclesiastical career
- Religion: Christianity (Anglican)
- Church: Church of England
- Ordained: 1947 (deacon); 1948 (priest)

Academic background
- Education: St Edmund Hall, Oxford; St Chad's College, Durham

Academic work
- Discipline: History
- Sub-discipline: Ecclesiastical history
- Institutions: University of Tasmania; University of Sydney; University of Leicester; All Souls College, Oxford
- Military career
- Service: British Army
- Rank: Major
- Units: 1st Battalion, Royal Northumberland Fusiliers
- Conflicts: Second World War: Western Desert campaign

John McManners CBE FBA FAHA (25 December 1916 – 4 November 2006) was a British clergyman and historian of religion who specialized in the history of the church and other aspects of religious life in 18th-century France. He was Regius Professor of Ecclesiastical History at the University of Oxford from 1972 to 1984. He also served as Fellow and Chaplain of All Souls College, Oxford, from 1964 to 2001.

== Birth and early education ==
McManners, known as Jack to his family and friends, was born on 25 December 1916 in Ferryhill, County Durham, to Joseph and Ann McManners. His mother was a school teacher who converted his coal miner father to the Anglican faith. His father entered the priesthood, eventually becoming the vicar of Ferryhill and subsequently a canon of Durham Cathedral. McManners attended Spennymoor Grammar School before winning an exhibition to St Edmund Hall, Oxford, in 1936. While at Oxford he took a Bachelor of Arts degree with first-class honours in modern history in 1939.

== Military service ==
In September 1939 Great Britain entered the Second World War prompting McManners immediately to volunteer for military service. He joined his local regiment the Royal Northumberland Fusiliers, where he made his name as a winger in their football team, and completed basic training. He was sent to the OCTU at Fenham Barracks where he was put through basic training for a second time, and commissioned. McManners served in the Western Desert Campaign and was at the Siege of Tobruk. He was made Adjutant of the First Battalion, under Commanding Officer Lt Col Forbes-Watson.

McManners also served with the 210 British Liaison Unit (Greek Mission) in Alexandria to help prepare Greece for the time after the war.

== Ordination and early teaching career ==
While in the military McManners decided to follow his father's vocation and become ordained into the Church of England. He studied at St Chad's College, Durham, and was ordained as a deacon in 1947 and a priest in 1948. He first served as curate of Leeds Parish Church for 10 months. Then, in 1948, invited back to his alma mater to be the Chaplain and lecture in History.

In 1951 he married Sarah Errington whom he met while studying in Durham. They had two sons, Hugh and Peter, and two daughters, Ann and Helen.

In 1956 he accepted the chair of History at the University of Tasmania in Hobart, Australia. He remained for four years before moving to the University of Sydney as the chair of History from 1960 to 1965.

== Return to England ==
He returned to England and Oxford University from 1965 to 1966 to be a senior visiting fellow at All Souls College, Oxford. Then he served as a professor in history at the University of Leicester. In 1972 McManners was appointed to the Regius Professor of Ecclesiastical History at Oxford and returned there, also to serve in Christ Church Cathedral, Oxford. He retired from teaching in 1984 and was became a chaplain at All Souls College, where he was appointed a college fellow in 1986. It was not until 2001, due to health concerns, that he resigned as chaplain; the college then elected him to an honorary fellowship. He died on 4 November 2006.

== Published works ==
In 1960 McManners's first book, French Ecclesiastical Society Under the Ancient Regime: A Study of Angers in the Eighteenth Century, established him as a respected scholar of French history. It was a detailed examination of church life on a local level in a small provincial city. The study of common society contrasted with most of the works of the time that only concentrated on the upper class.

While at Leicester he published French Revolution and the Church and Church and State in France, 1870–1914.

He won the 1982 Wolfson History Prize for Death and the Enlightenment. In a 1986 review Joseph Tempesta of Ithaca College describes it as a study "extensively researched" that "brings the era to life". It was hailed by The Times as "one of the ten best non-fiction books of the year".

McManners was the general editor of the Oxford Illustrated History of Christianity that was published in 1990. It was a best seller with excellent scholarly standards.

The two-volume Church and Society in Eighteenth-Century France published in 1998 "represents an enormous achievement" as reported by Raymond Mentzer of Montana State University. It is two volumes, more than 1600 pages of text documenting four generations of pre-revolutionary France and the culmination of more than 50 years of research.

In 2002 McManners published the autobiographical Fusilier: Recollections and Reflections, 1939–1945 documenting his experiences during the war.

His final book, All Souls and the Shipley Case, 1808–1810 documented an early-19th-century sex scandal at All Souls College. When doing unrelated research McManners found a sealed packet of letters that became the basis for this book.

== Select bibliography ==
- French Ecclesiastical Society Under the Ancient Regime: A Study of Angers in the Eighteenth Century (1960)
- Lectures on European History, 1789–1914 (1966)
- French Revolution and the Church (1970)
- Church and State in France, 1870–1914 (1972)
- Death and the Enlightenment: Changing Attitudes to Death Among Christians and Unbelievers in Eighteenth-Century France (1981)
- Oxford Illustrated History of Christianity (1990) editor
- Church and Society in Eighteenth-Century France (1998)
- The Oxford History of Christianity (2002)
- Fusilier: Recollections and Reflections, 1939–1945 (2002)
- All Souls and the Shipley Case, 1808–1810 (2002)

== Awards and honours ==
- 1939 First in Modern History St Edmund Hall, Oxford
- 1970-1978 Trustee of the National Portrait Gallery
- 1972-1984 Regius Professor of Ecclesiastical History at University of Oxford
- 1977-1978 President of the Ecclesiastical History Society
- 1978 Fellow of the British Academy (FBA)
- 1978-1982 Doctrinal Commission of the Church of England
- 1982 Wolfson History Prize for Death and the Enlightenment
- 1992 Ordre des Palmes Académiques
- 2000 Order of the British Empire (CBE)
- 2001 Ordre national du Mérite

Academic offices
Preceded by Stanley Lawrence Greenslade	Regius Professor of Ecclesiastical History; 1972–1984	Succeeded by Peter Hinchliff
Professional and academic associations
Preceded by J. K. Cameron	President of the Ecclesiastical History Society; 1977–1978	Succeeded by Robert Austin Markus
Awards
Preceded by J. W. Burrow	Wolfson History Prize; 1982	Succeeded by Martin Gilbert
Preceded by J. W. Burrow	Wolfson History Prize; 1982	Succeeded by Kenneth Rose
