= Sozomen =

5th-century Eastern Roman lawyer and historian

Salamanes Hermias Sozomenos (Ancient Greek: Σαλαμάνης Ἑρμείας Σωζομενός; (Note: Attested corruptions of his name include Salminius and Salaminius.) Latin: Sozomenus; c. 400 – c. 450 AD), also known as Sozomen, was a Byzantine Empire era lawyer and historian of the Christian Church.

== Family and home ==
Sozomen was born around 400 in Bethelia, a small town near Gaza, into a wealthy Christian family of Palestine (Palestina Prima) in the Byzantine Empire. He recorded the history of Southern Palestine derived from oral tradition. He appeared to be familiar with the region around Gaza, and mentioned having seen Bishop Zeno of Majuma at the seaport of Gaza.

Sozomen wrote that his grandfather lived at Bethelia, near Gaza, and became a Christian together with his household, probably under Constantius II. A neighbor, who was probably a relative of their household, named Alaphion was miraculously healed by Saint Hilarion, who cast out a demon from Alaphion. As eyewitnesses to the miracle, his family converted, along with Alaphion's. The conversion marked a turning point in the Christianization of southern Palestine, according to his account.

The grandfather became within his own circle a highly esteemed interpreter of Scripture and according to Sozomen "much beloved by the Christians of Ascalon, Gaza and of the surrounding country". The descendants of the wealthy Alaphion founded churches and convents in the district, and were particularly active in promoting monasticism and were also esteemed by Sozomen. Sozomen himself had conversed with one of these, a very old man. He states that he was brought up under monastic influences and his story bears this out.

== Life and career ==
=== Education ===
Sozomen seems to have been brought up in the circle of Alaphion and acknowledges a debt of gratitude to the monastic order. His early education was directed by the monks in his native place. It is impossible to ascertain what curriculum he followed in these monastic schools, but his writings give clear evidence of the thoroughness with which he was grounded in Greek studies. As a man he retained the impressions of his youth, and his work revered the monks and the disciples of Hilarion in particular.

=== Lawyer ===
Sozomen studied at the Law school of Berytus between 400-402 and acquired training as a lawyer. He then went to Constantinople to start his career, perhaps at the court of Theodosius II. While thus engaged he conceived, around the year 443, the project of writing a history of the Church.

== Writings on Church history ==
Sozomen wrote two works on church history, of which only the second is extant.

His first work covered the history of the Church, from the Ascension of Jesus to the defeat of Licinius in 323, in twelve books. His sources for it included Eusebius of Caesarea, the Clementine homilies, Hegesippus, and Sextus Julius Africanus.

Sozomen's second work continues approximately where his first work left off. He wrote it in Constantinople, around the years 440 to 443 and dedicated it to Emperor Theodosius II.

The work is structured into nine books, roughly arranged along the reigns of Roman Emperors:

- Book I: from the conversion of Constantine I until the Council of Nicea (312–325)
- Book II: from the Council of Nicea to Constantine's death (325–337)
- Book III: from the death of Constantine I to the death of Constans I (337–350)
- Book IV: from the death of Constans I to the death of Constantius II (350–361)
- Book V: from the death of Constantius II to the death of Julian the Apostate (361–363)
- Book VI: from the death of Julian to the death of Valens (363–378)
- Book VII: from the death of Valens to the death of Theodosius I (378–395)
- Book VIII: from the death of Theodosius I to the death of Arcadius (395–408).
- Book IX: from the death of Arcadius to the accession of Valentinian III (408–425).

Book IX is incomplete. In his dedication of the work, he states that he intended cover up to the 17th consulate of Theodosius II, that is, to 439. The extant history ends about 425. Scholars disagree on why the end is missing. Albert Guldenpenning supposed that Sozomen himself suppressed the end of his work because in it he mentioned the Empress Aelia Eudocia, who later fell into disgrace through her supposed adultery. However, it appears that Nicephorus, Theophanes, and Theodorus Lector actually read the end of Sozomen's work, according to their own histories later. Therefore, most scholars believe that the work actually came down to that year and that consequently it has reached us only in a damaged condition.

=== Other writings ===
According to historian and scholar of Islam Michael Cook, Sozomen wrote that a group of "Saracens" (Arabs) in Palestine had adopted Jewish laws and customs after coming into contact with Jews and may have been (according to Cook) the forerunners of Islam and Muslims.

=== Sources ===
Sozomen borrowed heavily from other sources for his work.

The source for about three fourths of his material was the writings of Socrates Scholasticus. The literary relationship of those writers appears everywhere. Valesius asserted that Sozomen read Socrates, and Robert Hussey and Guldenpenning have proved this. For example, Socrates, in I.x, relates an anecdote which he had heard, and says that neither Eusebius nor any other author reports it, yet this anecdote is found in Sozomen, I.xxii, the similarity of diction showing that the text of Socrates was the source.

The extent of this dependence cannot be accurately determined. Sozomen used the work of Socrates as a guide to sources and order. In some matters, such as in regard to the Novatians, Sozomen is entirely dependent on Socrates.

But Sozomen did not simply copy Socrates. He went back to the principal sources used by Socrates and other sources, often including more from them than Socrates did.

He used the writings of Eusebius, the first major Church historian. The Vita Constantini of Eusebius is expressly cited in the description of the vision of Constantine.

Sozomen appears also to have consulted the Historia Athanasii and also the works of Athanasius including the Vita Antonii. He completes the statements of Socrates from the Apologia contra Arianos, lix, sqq., and copies Athanasius' Adv. episcopos Aegypti, xviii-xix.

Rufinus is frequently used. Instructive in this respect is a comparison of Sozomen, Socrates, and Rufinus on the childhood of Athanasius. Rufinus is the original; Socrates expressly states that he follows Rufinus, while Sozomen knows Socrates' version, but is not satisfied with it and follows Rufinus more closely.

The ecclesiastical records used by Sozomen are principally taken from Sabinus, to whom he continually refers. In this way he uses records of the synods from that of Tyre (335) to that of Antioch in Caria (367).

For the period from Theodosius I, Sozomen stopped following the work of Socrates and followed Olympiodorus of Thebes, who was probably Sozomen's only secular source. A comparison with Zosimus, who also made use of Olympiodorus, seems to show that the whole ninth book of Sozomen, is mostly an abridged extract from Olympiodorus.

Sozomen used many other authorities. These include sources relating to Christianity in Persia, monastic histories, the Vita Martini of Sulpicius Severus, the works of Hilarius, logoi of Eustathius of Antioch, the letter of Cyril of Jerusalem to Constantius concerning the miraculous vision of the cross, and Palladius.

He also used oral tradition, adding some of the most distinctive value to his work.

=== Publication ===
The first printed (though untranslated) version of Sozomen, which was based on the Codex Regius of 1444, was that of Robert Estienne at Paris in 1544. The first translated edition to be published was that of Christophorson, which appeared in Latin in Geneva in 1612.

A noteworthy edition was done by Valesius (Cambridge, 1720), who used, besides the text of Stephens, a Codex Fucetianus (now at Paris, 1445), "Readings" of Savilius, and the indirect traditions of Theodorus Lector and of Cassiodorus-Epiphanius.

Hussey's posthumous edition (largely prepared for the press by John Barrow, who wrote the preface) is important, since in it the archetype of the Codex Regius, the Codex Baroccianus 142, is collated for the first time. But this manuscript was written by various hands and at various times and therefore is not equally authoritative in all its parts.

There is an excellent English translation published in 1846 (London, Samuel Bagster and Sons), translator unnamed, later reprinted and credited to Chester David Hartranft (1839-1914), with a learned though somewhat diffuse introduction, in the Nicene and Post-Nicene Fathers, II (published New York, 1890). (This text is available online at the Christian Classics Ethereal Library.)
