= Peter Hinchliff =

South African Priest

The Reverend Canon Peter Hinchliff
- Born: 25 February 1929; South Africa
- Died: 17 October 1995 (aged 66); Oxford, Oxfordshire, England
- Relatives: Chris Hinchliff (grandson)

Academic background
- Education: Rhodes University; Trinity College, Oxford; St Paul's Theological College, Grahamstown

Academic work
- Discipline: Historian
- Sub-discipline: Church history; comparative religion
- Institutions: Rhodes University; Balliol College, Oxford; Christ Church, Oxford

Peter Bingham Hinchliff (25 February 1929 – 17 October 1995) was a South African Anglican priest and academic. He was the Regius Professor of Ecclesiastical History at the University of Oxford from 1992 to 1995.

== Early life ==
Hinchliff was born in South Africa on 25 February 1929 to an Anglican priest who had moved to the country in 1914. Hinchliff attended St. Andrew's College, Grahamstown He studied at Rhodes University, before moving to England. There he matriculated into Trinity College, Oxford, where he studied theology under Austin Farrer. Returning to South Africa, he attended St Paul’s Theological College, Grahamstown before his ordination.

== Career ==
=== Ecclesiastical career ===
Hinchliff was ordained deacon 1952 and priest in 1953. His first posting was as a curate in Uitenhage, Eastern Cape Province. From 1955 to 1959, he was sub-warden of his alma mater, St Paul's College, Grahamstown. In 1964, he was appointed a canon and chancellor of Grahamstown Cathedral.

In 1974, it was suggested that he was a candidate for the position of Archbishop of Cape Town, however Bill Burnett was eventually appointed. In January 1992, he was appointed a canon of Christ Church Cathedral, Oxford, in the Church of England.

=== Academic career ===
From 1957 to 1959, Hinchliff was a lecturer in comparative religion at Rhodes University. In 1960, he was appointed Professor of Ecclesiastical History. He resigned the position in 1969 in protest against apartheid that had worsened with the passing of the Separate Representation of Voters Amendment Act, 1968. From 1969 until 1972, Hinchliff served as secretary of the Missionary and Ecumenical Council of the Church Assembly. In 1972, he became chaplain and fellow of Balliol College, Oxford.

In January 1992, Hinchliff was appointed Regius Professor of Ecclesiastical History and Fellow of Christ Church, Oxford. He died suddenly on 17 October 1995 in Oxford.

== Selected works ==
- Hinchliff, Peter (1964). Bishop of Natal. Nelson.
- Hinchliff, Peter Bingham (1964). John William Colenso: Bishop of Natal. Nelson.
- Hinchliff, Peter (1971). The Journal of John Ayliff: 1 : 1821-1830. A.A. Balkema.
- Hinchliff, Peter Bingham (1987). Benjamin Jowett and the Christian Religion. Clarendon Press. ISBN 978-0-19-826688-4.
- Hinchliff, Peter (1995). Cathedrals and Society: A Theological Appraisal.
- Hinchliff, Peter. "Holiness and Politics". ThirdWay. Vol. 6. Hymns Ancient & Modern Ltd.
- Hinchliff, Peter (2009). "Frederick Temple, Randall Davidson and the Coronation of Edward VII". The Journal of Ecclesiastical History. 48 (1): 71–99. doi:10.1017/S0022046900011982. ISSN 0022-0469. S2CID 161940216.
- Hinchliff, Peter (2011). "Ethics, Evolution and Biblical Criticism in the Thought of Benjamin Jowett and John William Colenso". The Journal of Ecclesiastical History. 37 (1): 91–110. doi:10.1017/S0022046900031924. ISSN 0022-0469. S2CID 170754553.
- Hinchliff, Peter (2011). "John William Colenso: a Fresh Appraisal". The Journal of Ecclesiastical History. 13 (2): 203–216. doi:10.1017/S0022046900068342. ISSN 0022-0469. S2CID 162481878.
- Hinchliff, P. (1990). "Book Review: A Black Future?: Jesus and Salvation in South Africa". Theology. 93 (756): 493–494. doi:10.1177/0040571X9009300625. ISSN 0040-571X. S2CID 170506514.

Academic offices
Preceded by John McManners	Regius Professor of Ecclesiastical History; 1992–1995	Succeeded by Henry Mayr-Harting
