= Sarah Foot =

English Anglican priest and historian (born 1961)

The Very Reverend Sarah Foot FSA FRHistS
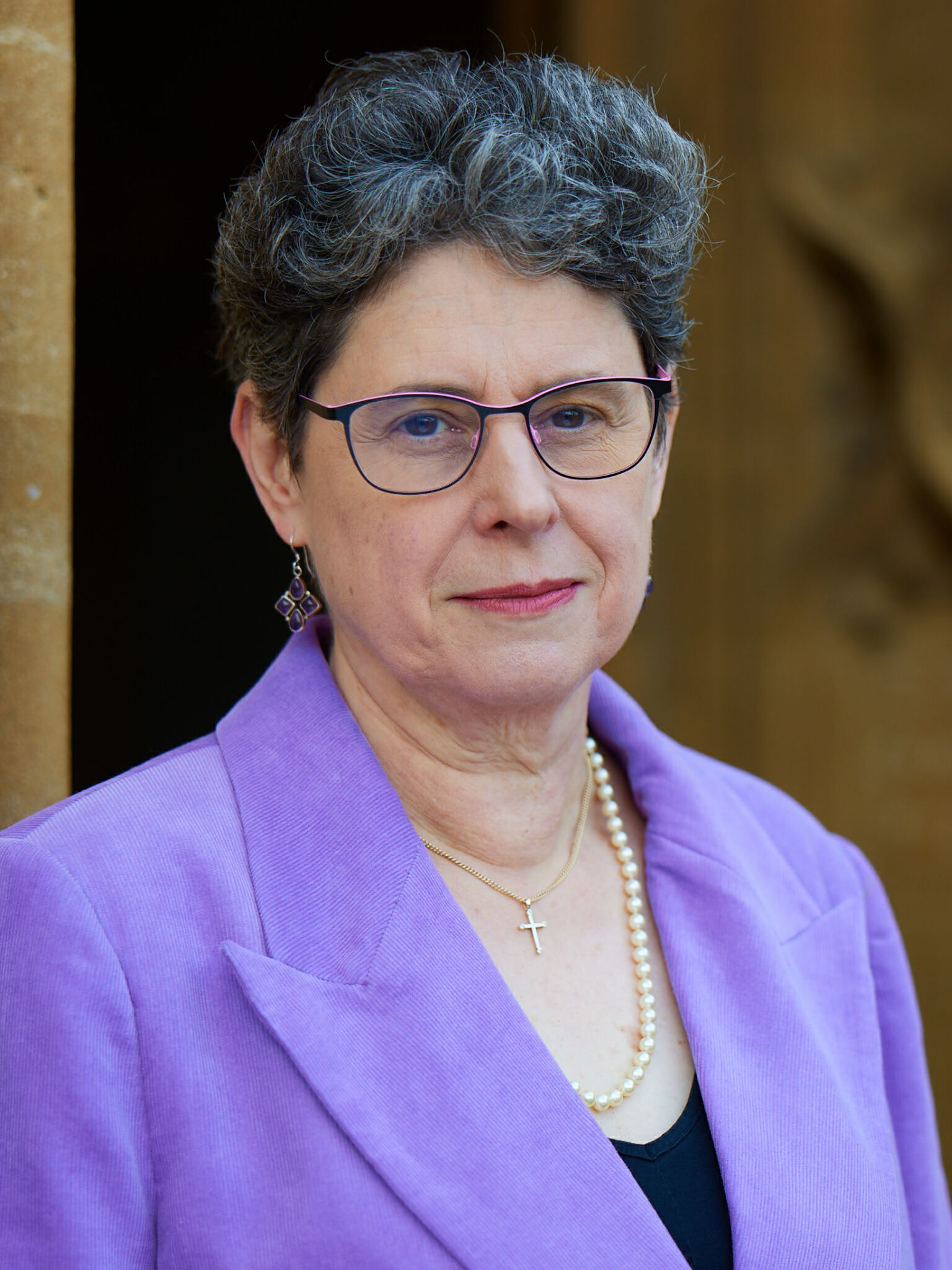
- Foot in 2023
- Born: Sarah Rosamund Irvine Foot; 23 February 1961 (age 65)
- Title: Dean of Christ Church, Oxford
- Spouses: Geoff Schrecker (m. 1986; div. 1999); Michael Bentley (m. 2002)
- Father: M. R. D. Foot

Academic background
- Education: Newnham College, Cambridge (MA, PhD)
- Thesis: Anglo-Saxon Ministers, AD 597 – ca. 900 (1989)
- Doctoral advisor: Rosamond McKitterick
- Influences: John Blair; Simon Keynes; Rosamond McKitterick

Academic work
- Discipline: History
- Sub-discipline: Early medieval English history; ecclesiastical history; historiography
- Institutions: Gonville and Caius College, Cambridge; University of Sheffield; Christ Church, Oxford
- Main interests: Development of English identity; early medieval English monasticism; medieval Christian–Pagan relations; medieval women and religion

Ecclesiastical career
- Religion: Christianity (Anglican)
- Church: Church of England
- Ordained: 2017 (deacon); 2017 (priest)
- Offices held: Canon of Christ Church Cathedral, Oxford (2007–present)

Sarah Rosamund Irvine Foot (born 23 February 1961) is an English Anglican priest and early medieval historian. She has been Regius Professor of Ecclesiastical History at the University of Oxford since 2007, and Dean of Christ Church, Oxford since 2023.

== Early life and education ==
Foot was born on 23 February 1961 and is the daughter of the military historian M. R. D. Foot and his second wife Elizabeth. She was educated until 1979 at Withington Girls' School in Manchester. She then went up to Newnham College, Cambridge, to study at the Department of Anglo-Saxon, Norse, and Celtic, where she was taught by, amongst others, Rosamond McKitterick and Simon Keynes, completing the Anglo-Saxon, Norse and Celtic tripos in 1983. She graduated with a Bachelor of Arts (BA) degree in 1984; as per tradition, her BA was promoted to a Master of Arts (MA Cantab). She was awarded her Doctor of Philosophy (PhD) degree in 1990: her doctoral thesis, written under the supervision of Rosamond McKitterick, was titled Anglo-Saxon Minsters, AD 597 – ca. 900.

== Academic career and ordained ministry ==
Foot was, from 1989 to 1990, research fellow at Gonville and Caius College, Cambridge, before becoming a fellow and tutor there. In 1993 she took up a lectureship at the University of Sheffield, being promoted to senior lecturer in 2001. In 2004, she was appointed to the newly established chair of Early Medieval History.

On 22 February 2007 Queen Elizabeth II appointed Foot to the Regius Chair of Ecclesiastical History at the University of Oxford. She is the first woman ever to hold this chair. Postholders are expected to lead research and develop graduate studies within their areas of specialisation and to take a leading part in developing the work of the Oxford theology faculty. The professorship is also annexed to a canonry at Christ Church, although the post-holder need be only a layperson; at a special ceremony on 6 October 2007 Foot was installed as residentiary canon of the cathedral.

From 2007 to 2017, Foot was a lay canon of Christ Church Cathedral, Oxford. During this time, she felt the call to ordination. She trained for Holy Orders on the Oxford Ministry Course, a part-time course taught at Ripon College Cuddesdon. On 1 July 2017, she was ordained in the Church of England as a deacon by Steven Croft, the Bishop of Oxford. On 21 December 2017, she was ordained as a priest by Colin Fletcher, the Bishop of Dorchester. Since 2017, she has been a residentiary canon of Christ Church Cathedral in the Diocese of Oxford. She was also a non-stipendiary minister at Christ Church Cathedral from 2017 to 2019.

In March 2023, Foot's appointment as the Dean of Christ Church was approved by King Charles III. She is the first woman to serve in the role. She took up the appointment effective 1 July 2023, and was installed at the cathedral during a service on 8 July. The dean is both head of an Oxford college (Christ Church) and of the cathedral of the Diocese of Oxford (Christ Church Cathedral).

=== Research interests ===
Her main areas of research lie in the history of Anglo-Saxon England, particularly Anglo-Saxon monasteries, women and religion, and the Cistercians. She also works on the history of the early medieval church and society as well as the invention of the English in historiography, and historical theory. In 2001 she was awarded a major grant to carry out research into the ruined Cistercian abbeys of Yorkshire. She has written a biography of Æthelstan, commonly regarded by modern historians (including Foot) as the first king of all England. Among her current projects are the charters of Bury St Edmunds Abbey. She contributed to an episode of BBC Radio 4's In Our Time on the life of St Cuthbert, broadcast in January 2021. Foot is an editor of the Oxford History of Historical Writing.

== Personal life ==
In 1986, Foot married Geoffrey Schrecker; they divorced in 1999. Together they had one son.

In 2002, she married Michael Bentley, Emeritus Professor of Modern History at the University of St Andrews and Senior Research Fellow and Stipendiary Lecturer in History at St Hugh's College, Oxford.

== Honours ==
In 2001, Foot was elected a Fellow of the Royal Historical Society (FRHistS). On 14 June 2001, she was elected a Fellow of the Society of Antiquaries (FSA). She served as president of the Ecclesiastical History Society from 2011 to 2012.

== Selected works ==
- Handbook of Historical Theory, Sarah Foot and Nancy F. Partner (eds.), London, Sage 2012. ISBN 978-1-4129-3114-4
- Æthelstan: The First English King, New Haven, Yale University Press 2011. ISBN 978-0-300-12535-1
- "The Bishops of Selsey and the Creation of a Diocese in Sussex" in: Paul Foster and Rachel Moriarty (eds.), Chichester – The Palace and Its Bishops Otter Memorial Paper Number 27. Chichester: University of Chichester, 2011, pp. 90–101 ISBN 978-1-907852-03-9
- "Patrick Wormald as Historian", in: Stephen Baxter, Catherine E. Karkov, Janet L. Nelson and David Pelteret (eds.), Early Medieval Studies in Memory of Patrick Wormald, Farnham, Ashgate 2009. ISBN 0-7546-6331-0
- "Where English Becomes British: Rethinking Contexts for Brunanburh", in: Julia Barrow and Andrew Wareham (eds.), Myth, Rulership, Church and Charters: Essays in Honour of Nicholas Brooks, London, Ashgate 2008. ISBN 0-7546-5120-7
- Monastic life in Anglo-Saxon England, c. 600–900, Cambridge, Cambridge University Press 2006. ISBN 0-521-85946-8
- "Reading Anglo-Saxon Charters: Memory, Record or Story?", in: Elizabeth M. Tyler and Ross Balzaretti (eds.), Narrative and History in the Early Medieval West, Abingdon, Marston 2006. ISBN 2-503-51828-1
- "Finding the Meaning of Form: Narrative in Annals and Chronicles" in: Nancy F. Partner (ed.), Writing Medieval History (Writing History), London, Hodder Arnold 2005. ISBN 0-340-80845-4
- "The Historiography of the Anglo-Saxon 'Nation-State'" in: Len Scales and Oliver Zimmer (eds.), Power and the Nation in European History, Cambridge, Cambridge University Press 2005. ISBN 0-521-84580-7
- "Confronting Violence: A Medieval Perspective on the Ethics of Historiography" Storia della storiografia 42 (2002), pp. 23–41
- Veiled Women I: The Disappearance of Nuns from Anglo-Saxon England, Aldershot, Ashgate Publishing 2000. ISBN 0-7546-0043-2
- Veiled Women II: Female Religious Communities in England, 871–1066, Aldershot, Ashgate Publishing 2000. ISBN 0-7546-0044-0
- "Remembering, Forgetting and Inventing: Attitudes to the Past in England after the First Viking Age", Transactions of the Royal Historical Society, 6th series 9 (1999), pp. 185–200
- "English People" in: Michael Lapidge et al. (eds), The Blackwell Encyclopedia of Anglo-Saxon England, Oxford, Blackwell 1998, p. 170f. ISBN 0-631-15565-1
- "The Making of Angelcynn: English Identity before the Norman Conquest", Transactions of the Royal Historical Society, 6th series 6 (1996), pp. 25–49
- "Violence Against Christians? The Vikings and the Church in Ninth-Century England", Medieval History 1.3 (1991), pp. 3–16
- "Glastonbury's Early Abbots" in: Lesley Abrams and James P. Carley (eds.), The Archaeology and History of Glastonbury Abbey: Essays in Honour of the Ninetieth Birthday of C. A. Ralegh Radford, Woodbrigde, Boydell 1991, p. 163-189. ISBN 0-851-15284-8
- "What Was an Anglo-Saxon Monastery?" in: Judith Loades (ed.), Monastic Studies, Bangor, Headstart History 1990, p. 48-57. ISBN 1-8730-4100-4
- "Parochial Ministry in Early Anglo-Saxon England: The Role of Monastic Communities" in: W. J. Sheils and Diana Woods (eds.), The Ministry: Clerical and Lay, Oxford, Blackwell 1989, p. 43-54. ISBN 0-631-17193-2

== See also ==
- Regius Professor

Academic offices
Preceded by Henry Mayr-Harting	Regius Professor of Ecclesiastical History; 2007–present	Incumbent
Professional and academic associations
Preceded by Sheridan Gilley	President of the Ecclesiastical History Society; 2011–2012	Succeeded by Alexandra Walsham
