= Michael Bentley (historian) =

English historian (born 1948)

Michael Bentley FRHistS
- Born: Michael John Bentley; 12 August 1948 (age 78); Rotherham, England
- Spouses: Jane Fisher (m. 1970; div. 1994); Sarah Foot (m. 2002)

Academic background
- Education: University of Sheffield; St John's College, Cambridge
- Influences: Maurice Cowling

Academic work
- Discipline: History
- Sub-discipline: Late-modern British political history
- School or tradition: Peterhouse school
- Institutions: University of Sheffield; University of St Andrews; St Hugh's College, Oxford

Michael John Bentley (born 12 August 1948) is an English historian of British politics in the nineteenth and early twentieth centuries. He is Emeritus Professor of Modern History at the University of St Andrews and is currently Senior Research Fellow in History at St Hugh's College, Oxford. He is the biographer of the historian Herbert Butterfield, a former Master of Peterhouse, Cambridge.

== Early life and career ==
Bentley was born in Rotherham, South Yorkshire, in 1948, the son of Peter and Jessie Bentley. He attended the University of Sheffield, graduating with a Bachelor of Arts degree in history in 1969, before proceeding to postgraduate study at St John's College, Cambridge.

From 1977 to 1995 Bentley taught history at Sheffield. He then moved to the University of St Andrews, where he was appointed professor of modern history; he is now emeritus. As of 2021, he is senior research fellow and stipendiary lecturer in history at St Hugh's College, Oxford. In 2011 he was made a fellow of the Royal Historical Society.

== Critical reaction ==
Boyd Hilton has called Bentley's Politics Without Democracy 1815–1914 "a wonderfully 'inside' account of life at the top", whilst K. Theodore Hoppen claims the book "provides an interesting (if allusive) study of attitudes".

== Personal life ==
Bentley is married to the historian Sarah Foot.

== Works ==
- The Liberal Mind, 1914–1929 (1977)
- High and Low Politics in Modern Britain: Ten Studies (edited, with John Stevenson; 1983).
- Politics Without Democracy, 1815–1914 (1984, 1996)
- The Climax of Liberal Politics (1987)
- Companion to Historiography (1997)
- Modern Historiography: An Introduction (1998)
- Lord Salisbury's World (2001)
- Modernizing England's Past: English Historiography in the Age of Modernism, 1870–1970 (The Wiles Lectures) (2006)
- The Life and Thought of Herbert Butterfield: History, Science and God (2011)
