= Canonical quarter =

Area of houses for clerics of a cathedral

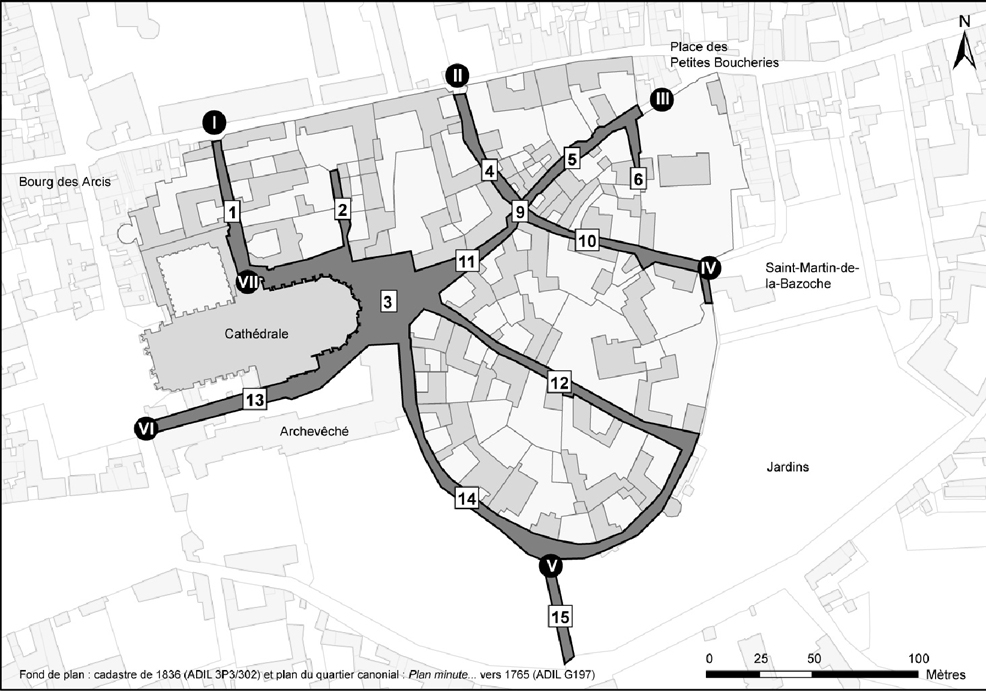
Canonical quarter of Tours (in dark gray).

A canonical quarter, called a cloister in the Middle Ages, is an area wholly or partly reserved for the residence of the canons of a chapter associated with a cathedral or a collegiate church. It includes the canons’ houses themselves, as well as the ancillary buildings necessary for the functioning of the chapter. It is a component of the episcopal group.

== History ==
Canonical quarters originated in the organization of communal life for clerics following the decisions of the council of Aachen in 816 (known as the Rule of Aachen) and the promulgation of a capitulary by Louis the Pious in 817. It was stipulated that clerics should reside either collectively under this rule, which combined cloistral discipline with the freedom to own private houses and personal wealth., or individually in canonical houses during periods of relaxed communal living. This ensemble was enclosed, and it was expected to include a refectory and, later, a chapter house

The development of canonical quarters reached its peak in the 12th century, a time when chapters competed with episcopal authorities. In the 16th century, the Wars of Religion rendered the fortifications of medieval cities obsolete and affected canonical life, which "deteriorated significantly. The cloister became the setting for weddings, masquerades, and banquets with violins, bonfires, gambling, and prostitution". The following two centuries marked a certain revival of cathedral and canonical quarters (though associated with a loss of their identity, as evidenced by the breaching of enclosure walls to accommodate the desire for urban commercial expansion) before they experienced an irreversible decline starting with the Revolution.

== Organization and architecture ==
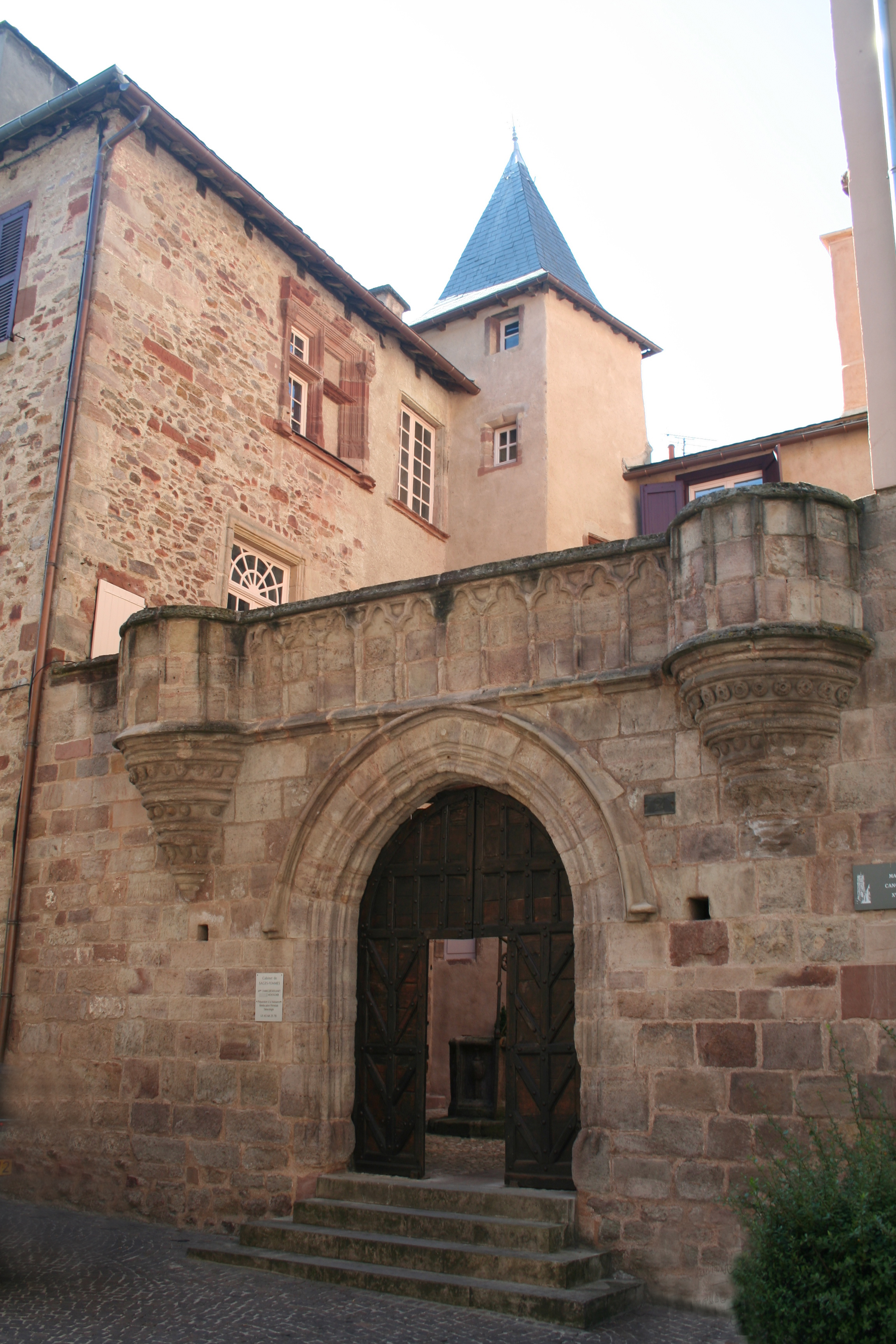
Canonical house in Rodez.

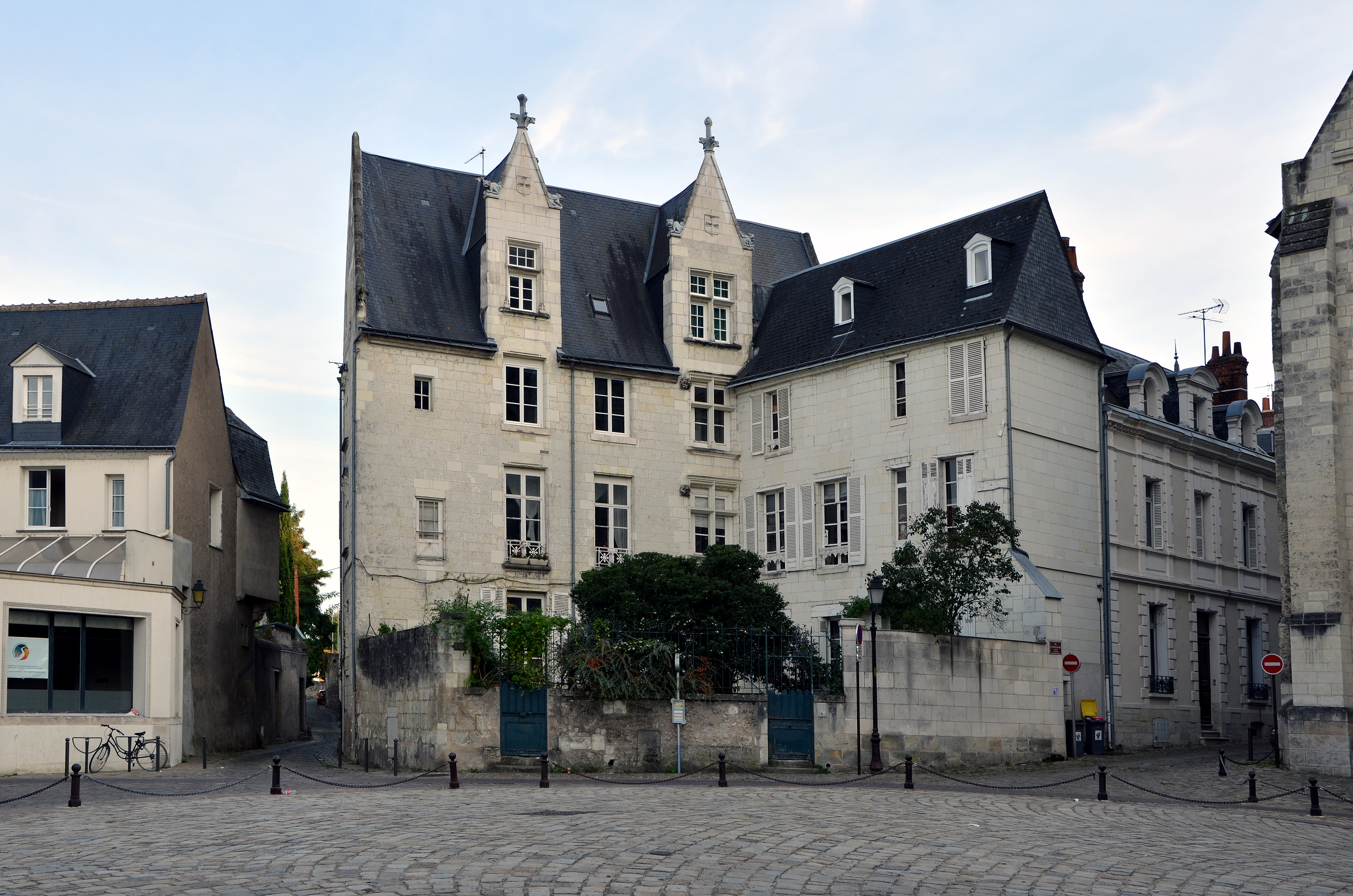
Canonical house in Tours.

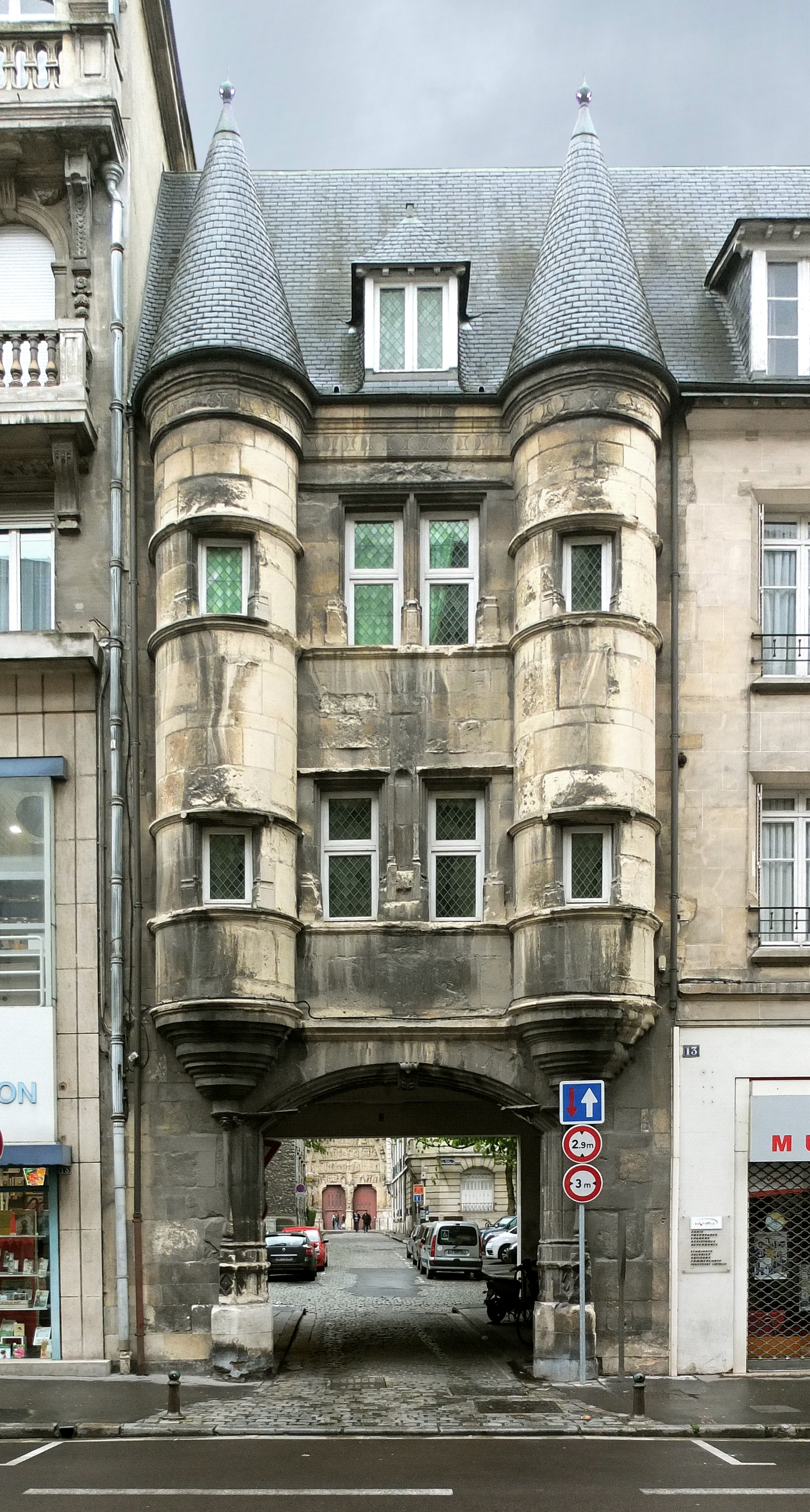
Porte du Chapitre in the canonical quarter in Reims.

The canonical quarter is generally built as close as possible to the cathedral or collegiate church, and it is sometimes equipped with an enclosure called the “canonical enclosure” (hence the name cloister given to the quarter) or “chapter enclosure,” which has no defensive role but serves as a physical demarcation, visibly indicating the limits of its ecclesiastical jurisdiction, and protecting the canons from the harmful influences of laypeople, particularly women.

A city within the city, this quarter constitutes a distinct enclave "with its well-defined population, its regulations aimed at preserving the calm necessary for prayer and excluding any profane activity (shops, taverns, animals causing nuisances)".

The spatial organization of the canonical quarter, as defined by the Rule of Aachen, closely resembles that of a monastery, with an enclosed complex forbidden to laypeople and women, comprising a dormitory or cells, later individual houses, the episcopal palace, and the chapter’s communal buildings (chapter house, refectory, cellar, granary, oven, etc.). These are built on large plots of land adjacent to the cathedral. These lands either belong to the Church or are acquired through exchanges with third-party owners.

From the 12th century onward, however, moments of communal life among the canons became rarer: the refectory was used only on certain occasions, and canons increasingly resided in large residences, occupied by one or more canons; these houses, often resulting from donations, were sometimes located outside the canonical enclosure, making the canonical quarter a sector with sometimes imprecise boundaries. This phenomenon reached its full extent during the Gothic period.

The canons’ residences, often built by wealthy owners who donated them, were frequently large and comfortable mansions where several canons could live in separate apartments. In his residence, the canon did not live alone but was surrounded by the canonical familia (relatives of varying degrees, less well-off clerics, young clerics, servants)

If they received the house as a personal donation, it was customary for them to relinquish ownership to the Church, retaining only usufruct. Benefiting from rents and in-kind advantages, canons had few ordinary expenses and could afford to expand. or embellish their residences, which testified to the affluence of this medieval aristocracy

== Bibliography ==
- Picard, Jean-Charles (1991). "Les quartiers canoniaux des cathédrales en France" [Canonical Quarters of Cathedrals in France]. Actes des congrès de la Société des historiens médiévistes de l'enseignement supérieur public (in French). 22 (22): 191–202. doi:10.3406/shmes.1991.1599.
- Picard, Jean-Charles (1998). "Les chanoines dans la ville. Recherches sur la topographie des quartiers canoniaux en France" [Canons in the City: Research on the Topography of Canonical Quarters in France]. Publications de l'École française de Rome (in French) (242): 451–466.

=== External links ===
- Crépin-Leblond, Thierry (5 February 2014). "Palais épiscopal et quartier canonial, l'environnement de la cathédrale en France au Moyen Âge" [Episcopal Palace and Canonical Quarter, the Environment of the Cathedral in France in the Middle Ages]. France Culture (in French).
