= Regius Professor of Ecclesiastical History =

The Regius Chair of Ecclesiastical History at the University of Oxford was founded by Queen Victoria in 1842. Previous Holders of the chair include John McManners, Peter Hinchliff and Henry Mayr-Harting.

The current Regius Professor of Ecclesiastical History is Sarah Foot (from Michaelmas 2007). She is also a Canon of Christ Church, Oxford.

== Professors ==
- 1842 Robert Hussey, first holder
- 1856 Arthur Penrhyn Stanley
- 1863–1866 Walter Waddington Shirley
- 1866 Henry Longueville Mansel
- 1868–1901 William Bright
- 1901–1908 Charles Bigg
- Edward William Watson
- 1934 Claude Jenkins
- 1960–1972 Stanley Lawrence Greenslade
- 1972–1984 John McManners
- 1992–1995 Peter Hinchliff
- 1997–2003 Henry Mayr-Harting
- 2007– Sarah Foot
