= Canon (title) =

Religious position in Christian church

Canon (Ancient Greek: κανονικός, romanized: kanonikós) is a Christian title usually used to refer to a member of certain bodies in subject to an ecclesiastical rule.

Originally, a canon was a cleric living with others in a clergy house or, later, in one of the houses within the precinct of or close to a cathedral or other major church and conducting his life according to the customary discipline or rules of the church. This way of life grew common (and is first documented) in the 8th century AD. In the 11th century, some churches required clergy thus living together to adopt the rule first proposed by Saint Augustine that they renounce private wealth. Those who embraced this change were known as Augustinians or Canons Regular, whilst those who did not were known as secular canons.

== Secular canons ==
=== Latin Church ===
In the Latin Church, canons are the members of a chapter, that is a body of senior clergy overseeing either a cathedral (a cathedral chapter) or a collegiate church. Depending on the title of the church, several languages use specific titles, e.g., in German Domherr or Domkapitular in a Dom (i.e., cathedral), Stiftsherr in a prelature that has the status of a Stift (notably under a prince of the Church).

One of the functions of the cathedral chapter in the Latin Church was to elect a vicar capitular (now named a diocesan administrator) to serve during a sede vacante period of the diocese. Since the 1983 revision of the Code of Canon Law, this responsibility belongs to the college of consultors, unless the national bishops conference decides that the functions that canon law ascribes to the college of consultors, including this one, are to be entrusted to the cathedral chapter.

=== Church of England ===
All canons of the Church of England have been secular since the Reformation, although an individual canon may also be a member of a religious order. Mostly, however, they are ordained, that is, priests or other clergy. Today, the system of canons is retained almost exclusively in connection with cathedral churches. A canon is a member of the chapter of (for the most part) priests, headed by a dean, which is responsible for administering a cathedral or certain other churches that are styled collegiate churches. The dean and chapter are the formal body which has legal responsibility for the cathedral and for electing the bishop.

== Honorary canons ==
The title of Canon is not a permanent title and, when no longer in a position entitling preferment, it is usually dropped from a cleric's title nomenclature. However, it is still given in many dioceses to senior parish priests (including some rural deans, those who have played a role in the wider life of the diocese, those who have served in the diocese for a long time, or similar) as a largely honorary title. It is usually awarded in recognition of long and dedicated service to the diocese.

It is the intention of bishops that when an honorary canon retires they retain their title though not their cathedral stall or any associated responsibilities. They remain canon in name only.

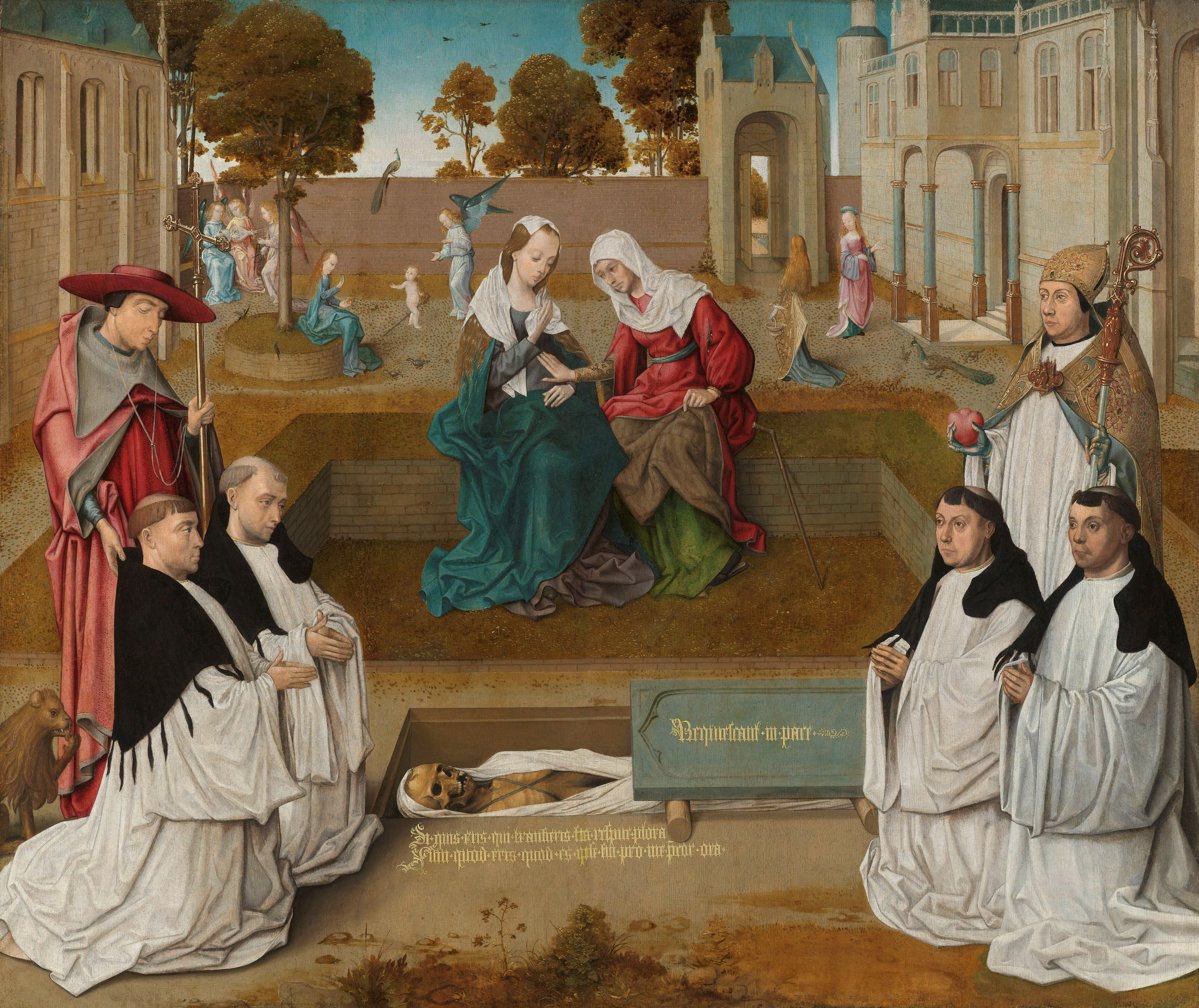
Four Canons with SS Augustine and Jerome by an Open Grave, with the Visitation. Master of the Spes Nostra (active c. 1500–1520, Northern Netherlands)

Generally speaking, canons in Anglican churches are either canons residentiary (working at the cathedral, and few in number) or honorary canons (non-cathedral clergy given the title as a mark of honour—often many of them): either may wear a violet or violet-trimmed cassock. In some Church of England dioceses, the title prebendary is used instead of canon when the cleric is involved administratively with a cathedral. Honorary canons are members of the chapter in name but are non-residential and receive no emoluments. They are entitled to call themselves canon and may have a role in the administration of the cathedral.

Canons may be members of the diocesan or bishop's staff rather than the cathedral staff, such as in the United States Episcopal Church, where a diocese's "Canon to the Ordinary" is a senior priest who works directly for the diocesan bishop (ordinary).

Honorary canons within the Catholic Church may still be nominated after the Second Vatican Council. Also, priests (and honorary chaplains) of the Sovereign Military Order of Malta and the Equestrian Order of the Holy Sepulchre are, in fact, titular or honorary canons of these respective Orders and have the right to the honorific title of "Canon" and "Monsignor" in addition to the choir dress of a canon, which includes the mozetta (black with purple piping for Malta and white with a red Jerusalem cross for Holy Sepulchre).

=== Lay canons ===
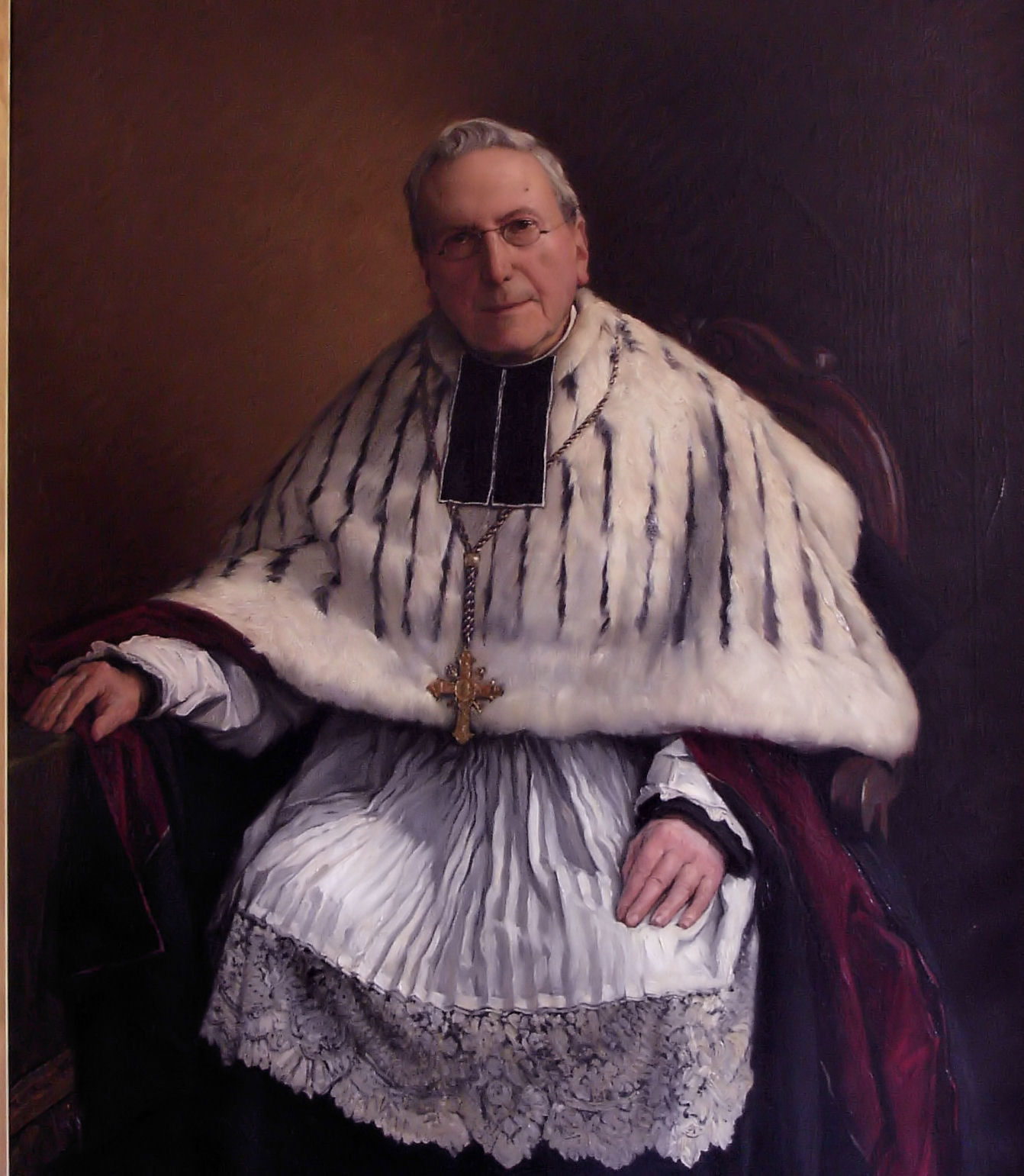
Petrus-Ludovicus Stillemans (1821–1902), brother of Antoon Stillemans and honorary canon of St Bavo's Cathedral, Ghent

Since the reign of King Henry IV, the heads of state of France have been granted by the Pope the title of sole honorary canon of Saint John Lateran and Saint Peter's. On the demise of the Kingdom of France this honour became transferred to the Presidents of the Republic, and hence is currently held by Emmanuel Macron. This applies even when the French President is a non-Catholic or even an atheist. The proto-canon of the papal basilica of Saint Mary Major is the King of Spain, currently Felipe VI.

In addition to canons who are clerics in holy orders, cathedrals in the Anglican Communion may also appoint lay persons as canons. The rank of "lay canon" is especially conferred upon diocesan chancellors (the senior legal officer of the diocese, who is usually, though not exclusively, a lay person).

== Canon professors ==
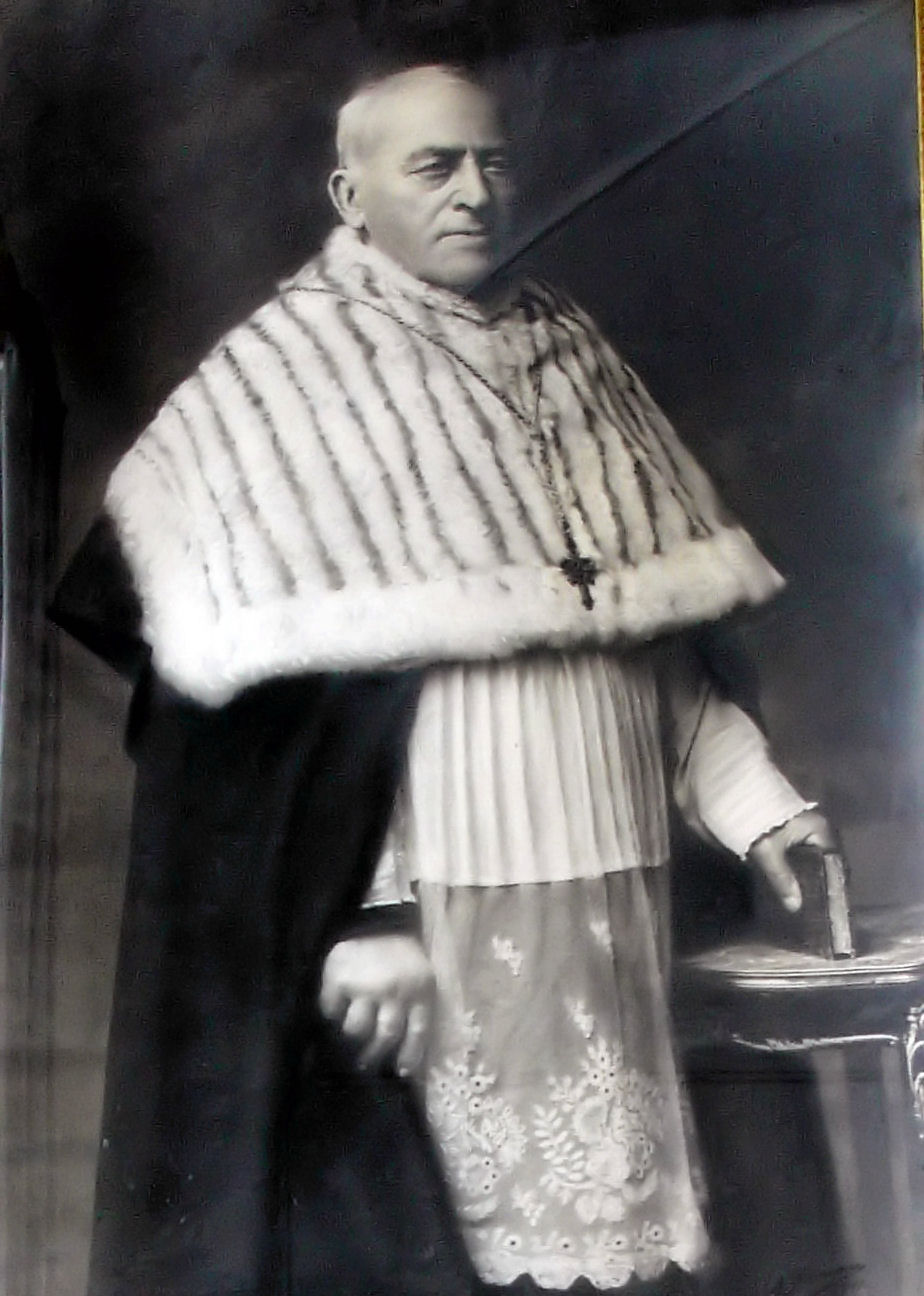
A Flemish canon in official clerical dress of canons

A canon professor is a canon at an Anglican cathedral (either lay or in orders) who also holds a university professorship. There are four canon professorships in the University of Oxford in conjunction with Christ Church Cathedral, Oxford and two in Durham University in conjunction with Durham Cathedral, although academics titled "canon professor" may also be found at other universities where the appointments as canon and professor have been made independently.

Section 2 of the Church of England (Miscellaneous Provisions) Measure 1995 was passed for the express purpose of enabling Christ Church Cathedral, Oxford, to appoint not more than two lay canons. One of the motivations for this provision was that, under section 6 of the Ecclesiastical Commissioners Act 1840 (3 & 4 Vict. c. 113), the position of Regius Professor of Ecclesiastical History in the University of Oxford was annexed to a residentiary canonry of the cathedral, meaning that the Regius professorship could be held only by an Anglican priest. Following the death of Peter Hinchliff in 1995 the Regius professorship was held by Henry Mayr-Harting, a Catholic layman, from 1997 until 2003, and was taken up by another lay person, Sarah Foot, in Michaelmas Term 2007. Three other Statutory Professorships, the Regius Professorship of Divinity, Lady Margaret Professorship of Divinity, recently held by the famous Anglican theologian, John Macquarrie, and Regius Professorship of Moral and Pastoral Theology, are annexed to canonries of Christ Church and were until recently held only by Anglican priests.

At Durham, the canon professorships are the Van Mildert Professor of Divinity, the holder of which must be an Anglican priest, and the Michael Ramsey Professor of Anglican Studies, who must be Anglican but did not have to be ordained. Historically, the chair in Greek at the university was also a canon professorship. This canonry was transferred to the Lightfoot Professor of Divinity in 1940.

The Lightfoot professorship was attached to the canonry until 1985, when the non-Anglican James Dunn was appointed.

== Minor canons ==
Minor canons are those clergy who are members of the foundation of a cathedral or collegiate establishment. They take part in the daily services. They have sometimes formed a distinct corporation as at St Paul's Cathedral, London. In St Patrick's Cathedral, Dublin, they are distinct from, and rank before, the Vicars Choral. The two groups overlap however; the two senior vicars, the Dean's Vicar and the Succentor, are also the two senior Minor Canons. Some Minor Canons do sit with, but are not voting members of, the Chapter. Although at present Minor Canons are generally more junior clergy this is a recent development. Within living memory such offices were often freehold and were held by clergy of great distinction and seniority.

== Canons regular ==
Canons regular are the members of certain religious orders in the Catholic Church (not to be confused with clerics regular), composed of priests who live in community with lay brothers. Their goal is to combine the clerical and monastic forms of life, thus they are equally committed to pastoral ministry and to the communal celebration of the Liturgy of the Hours. Their distinctive religious habit is the rochet, which can be rendered in a range of forms.

There are a variety of congregations of canons, some of which are part of the Confederation of Canons Regular of St. Augustine:

- Canons Regular of the Lateran or St. Saviour, which seems to date back to Pope Alexander II (1063)
- Order of the Canons Regular of Premontre, commonly known as Norbertines, founded by St. Norbert (1120)
- Order of the Holy Cross (Canons Regular) founded in Portugal in 1131 and re-founded in 1977
- Canons Regular of the Order of the Holy Cross (the Crosiers), founded at Clair-lieu, near Huy, in Belgium, in 1211
- Swiss Congregation of Canons Regular of the Abbey of Saint Maurice of Agaune
- Gilbertine Order, a solely English order of canons regular, driven to extinction under King Henry VIII
- Canons Regular of the Immaculate Conception, founded in France in 1871
- Canons Regular of St. John Cantius, founded in 1998 by C. Frank Phillips, C.R., and Francis Cardinal George, O.M.I.

Many bishops endeavoured to imitate St. Augustine and St. Eusebius, and to live a common life with the clergy of their church. Rules taken from the sacred canons were even drawn up for their use, of which the most celebrated is that of St. Chrodegang, Bishop of Metz (766). In the tenth century, this institution declined; the canons, as the clergy attached to a church and living a common life were called, began to live separately; some of them, however, resisted this relaxation of discipline, and even added poverty to their common life. This is the origin of the canons regular. Pope Benedict XII by his constitution Ad decorem (15 May 1339) prescribed a general reform of the canons regular. The canons regular ex professo united Holy Orders with religious life, and being attached to a church, devoted themselves to promoting the dignity of divine worship. With monks, Holy Orders are incidental and secondary, and are superadded to the religious life. With canons as with the clerks regular, Holy Orders are the principal thing, and the religious life is superadded to the Holy Orders.

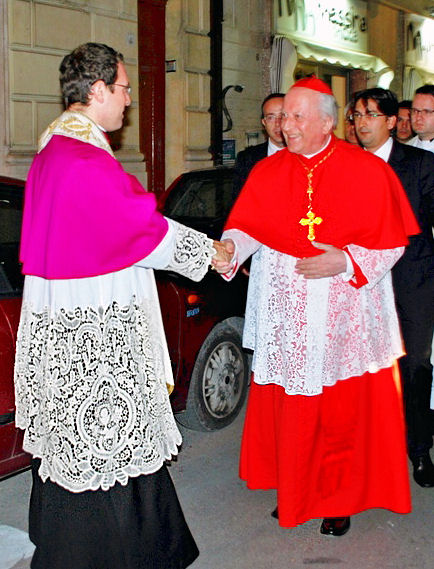
A canon ceremonially receives Cardinal Franc Rodé., C.M.

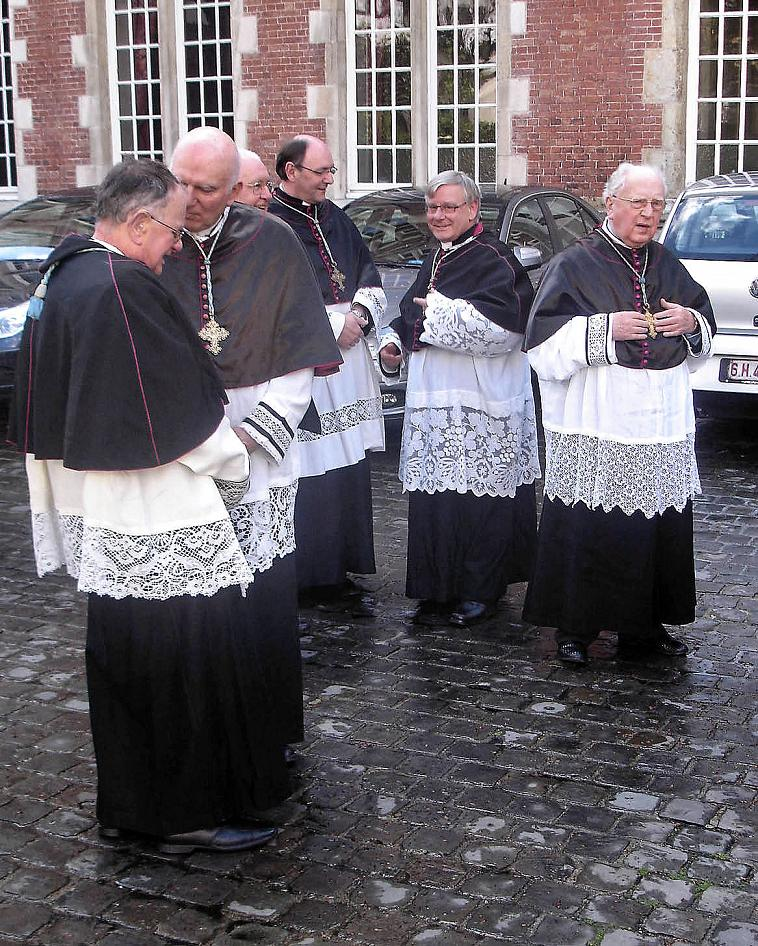
Canons, Bruges, Belgium

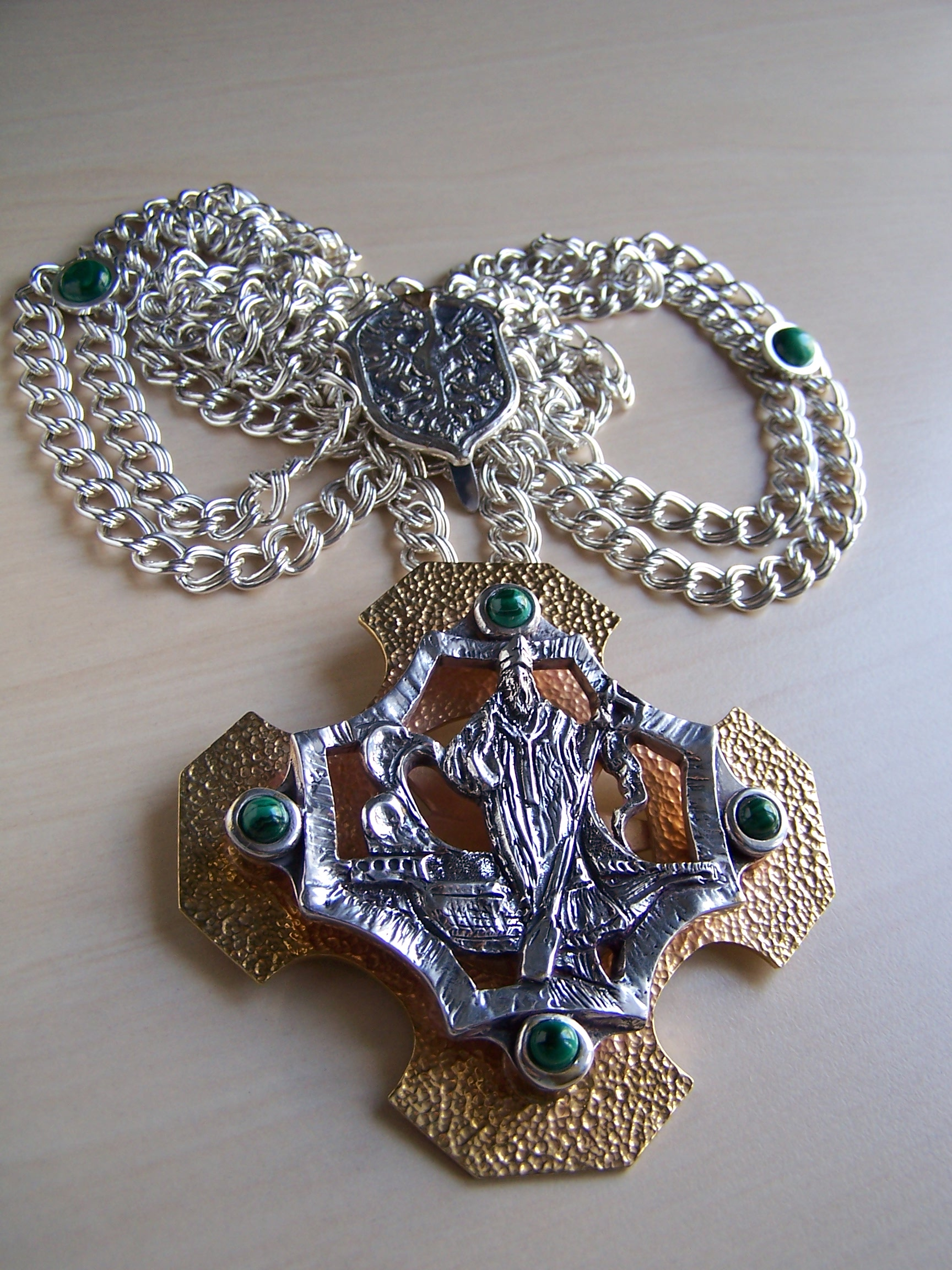
Canon cross by Giennadij Jerszow, Gdańsk

== See also ==
- Canon Inc.
- Canoness
- Canonical quarter
- Diocesan priest
- Index of religious honorifics and titles
