= William Bright (historian) =

William Bright (1824–1901) was an English ecclesiastical historian and Anglican priest.

== Life ==
He was born at Doncaster on 14 December 1824. He was the only son of William Bright, town-clerk of Doncaster, Yorkshire. He was sent first to a preparatory school at Southwell, and thence, in 1837, to Rugby, he there reached the sixth form at the time of Dr. Thomas Arnold's death. He gained a scholarship at University College, Oxford, he matriculated on 20 March 1843; obtained first-class honours in classics in 1846; was awarded the Johnson theological scholarship in 1847, and the Ellerton theological essay in 1848, the subject being 'The Prophetic Office under the Mosaic Dispensation.' He graduated B.A. in 1846, proceeding M.A. in 1849, and D.D. in 1869. He was ordained deacon in 1848 and priest in 1850.

He was elected fellow of University College in 1847, he retained his fellowship till 1868. He became tutor of his college in 1848, but in 1851 accepted the theological tutorship at Trinity College, Glenalmond, under the wardenship of Dr. Charles Wordsworth. In 1868, he was appointed Regius Professor of Ecclesiastical History at Oxford, and canon of Christ Church in succession to Arthur Penrhyn Stanley. He was proctor in convocation for the chapter of Christ Church from 1878; examining chaplain to Edward King; and sub-dean of Christ Church from 1895.

He died unmarried at Christ Church on 6 March 1901, and was buried in the Christ Church portion of Osney Cemetery, by Oxford.

Bright wrote a number of works and hymns. He published editions of several Church Fathers.

== Works ==
- Ancient Collects, Selected from Various Rituals, 1857 and second edition, 1862.
- Athanasius and Other Poems, by a Fellow of a College, 1858.
- History of the Church, from the Edict of Milan to the Council of Chalcedon 1860.
- Sermons of St. Leo the Great on the Incarnation, 1862 (translated).
- Faith and Life, 1864–66
- Liber Precum Publicarum: a Latin Version of the Book of Common Prayer. (With Canon Medd.) 1865.
- Hymns and Other Poems, 1866, 1874
- A Sermon on 'The Priesthood'. 1874.
- The Roman Claims tested by Antiquity., 1877.
- Chapters of Early English Church History 1878, revised 1897.
- Eusebius' Ecclesiastical History, second edition, 1881.
- Notes on the Canons of the First Four General Councils 1882.
- Private Prayers for a Week. 1882.
- The Orations of St Athanasius against the Arians, according to the Benedictine text. 1884
- Family Prayers for a Week. 1885.
- Iona, and other Verses. 1886.
- Addresses on the Seven Sayings from the Cross. 1887.
- Lessons from the Lives of Three Great Fathers. 1890.
- Socrates' Ecclesiastical History, according to the text of Hussey. second edition 1893.
- Waymarks in Church History. 1894.
- The Roman See in the Early Church 1896.
- The Proper Sense of the Word 'Catholic' as applied to Christian Communities or Individuals. 1897.
- Some Aspects of Primitive Church Life 1898.
- The Law of Faith. 1898.
- Selected letters of William Bright, D.D.
